= Woolwich Dockyard =

Naval dockyard in London, England; in use from 1512 to 1869

HM Dockyard, Woolwich
- Woolwich, SE London
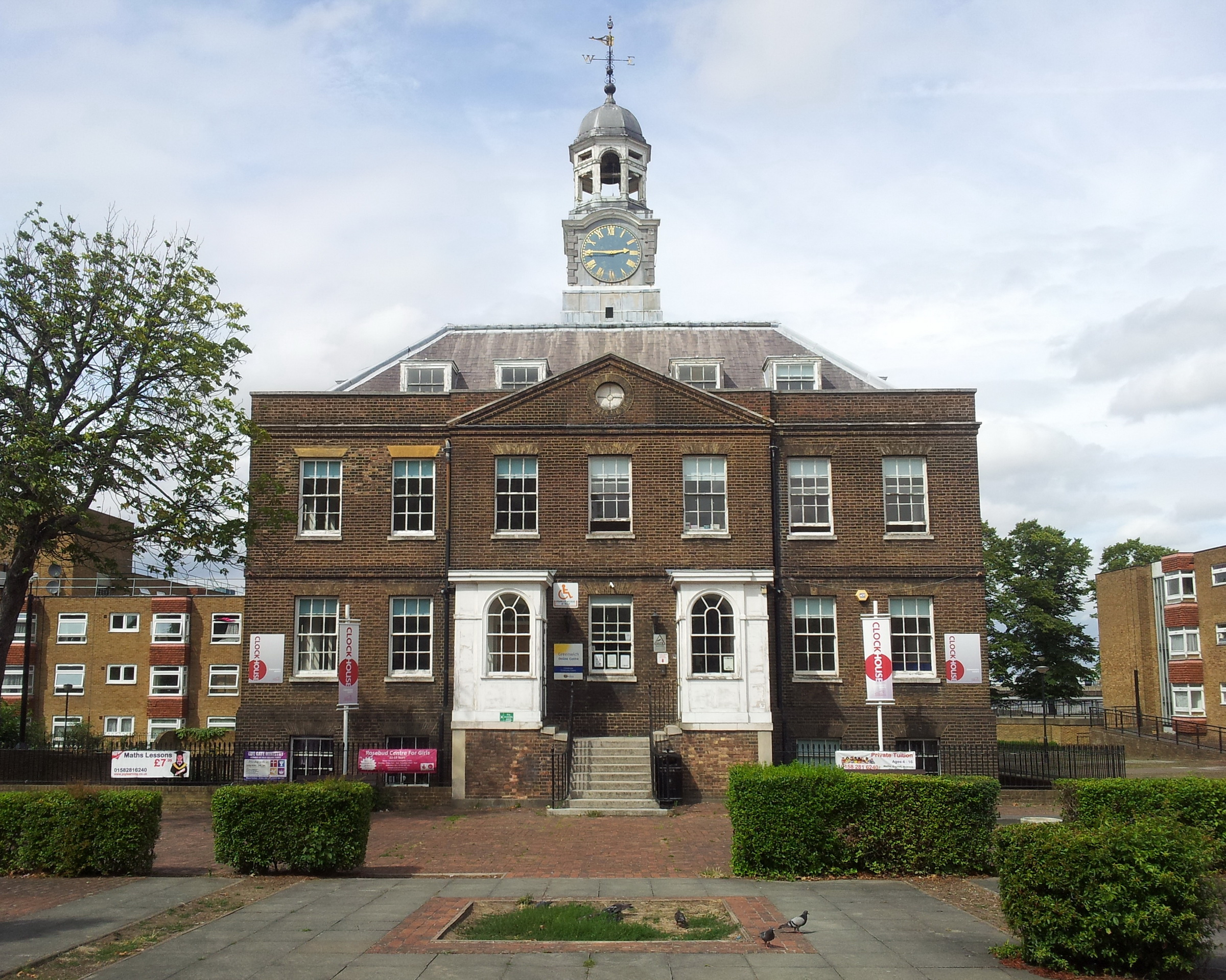
- Clock House (Dockyard offices, 1783–1784), the earliest surviving building on the Woolwich Dockyard site)

Site information
- Operator: Royal Navy
- Controlled by: The Navy Board (until 1832); the Admiralty (1832–1869).
- Other site facilities: The Gun Wharf, The Ropeyard and The Steam Factory

Location
- Coordinates: 51°29′40″N 0°3′22″E

Site history
- In use: 1512–1869

Woolwich Dockyard (formally H.M. Dockyard, Woolwich, also known as The King's Yard, Woolwich) was an English naval dockyard along the river Thames at Woolwich—originally in north-west Kent, now in southeast London—where many ships were built from the early 16th century until the late 19th century. William Camden called it 'the Mother Dock of all England'. By virtue of the size and quantity of vessels built there, Woolwich Dockyard is described as having been 'among the most important shipyards of seventeenth-century Europe'. During the Age of Sail, the yard continued to be used for shipbuilding and repair work more or less consistently; in the 1830s a specialist factory within the dockyard oversaw the introduction of steam power for ships of the Royal Navy. At its largest extent it filled a 56-acre site north of Woolwich Church Street, between Warspite Road and New Ferry Approach; 19th-century naval vessels were fast outgrowing the yard, however, and it eventually closed in 1869 (though a large part of the site remained in military hands for a further century). The former dockyard area is now partly residential, partly industrial, with remnants of its historic past having been restored.

== History ==
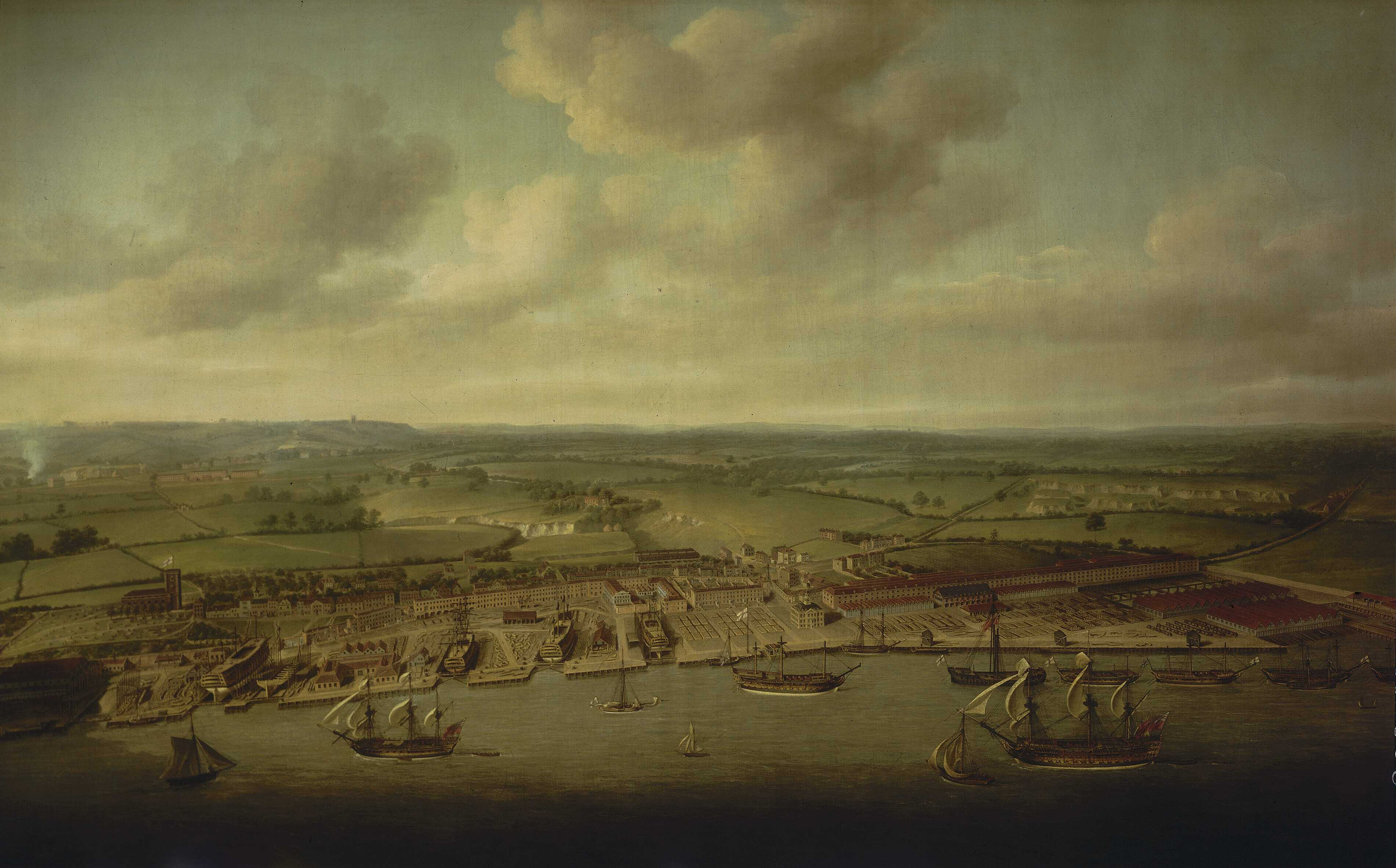
Woolwich Dockyard (Nicholas Pocock, 1790, National Maritime Museum). The surviving Clock House (then newly built) is seen centre-right, and the Parish Church far left. Left to right along the shoreline: three shipbuilding slips (two of which survive, much rebuilt, at Mast Quay), two dry docks (which also survive, much rebuilt) and a further slip (since filled in). Behind the latter stands the large Sail and Mould Loft of 1740, with the Great Storehouse to its right and the Officers' Terrace (houses with gardens) to the right of that; all these were demolished in the early 20th century. Everything west (right) of the Clock House was newly acquired land in 1790; the painting shows planned buildings, including a long ropehouse that was never in fact built.
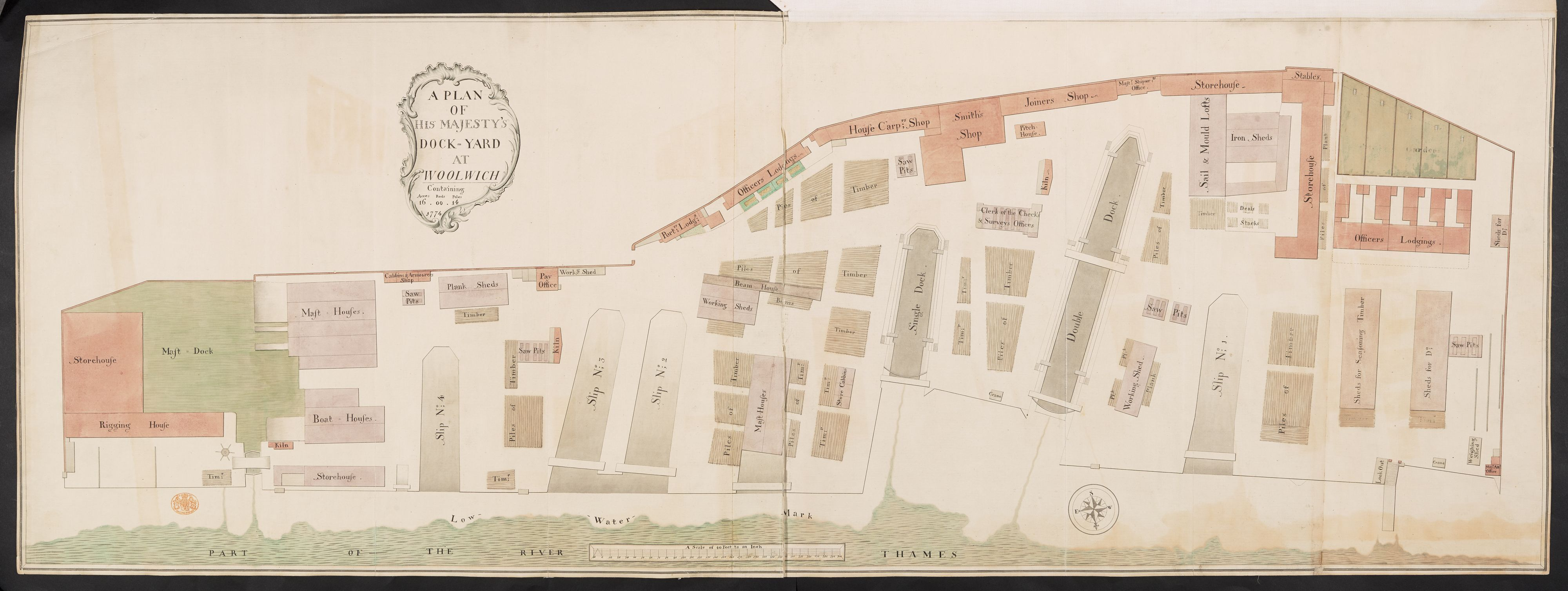
'A Plan of His Majesty's Dock-yard at Woolwich', dated 1774.

=== Origins ===
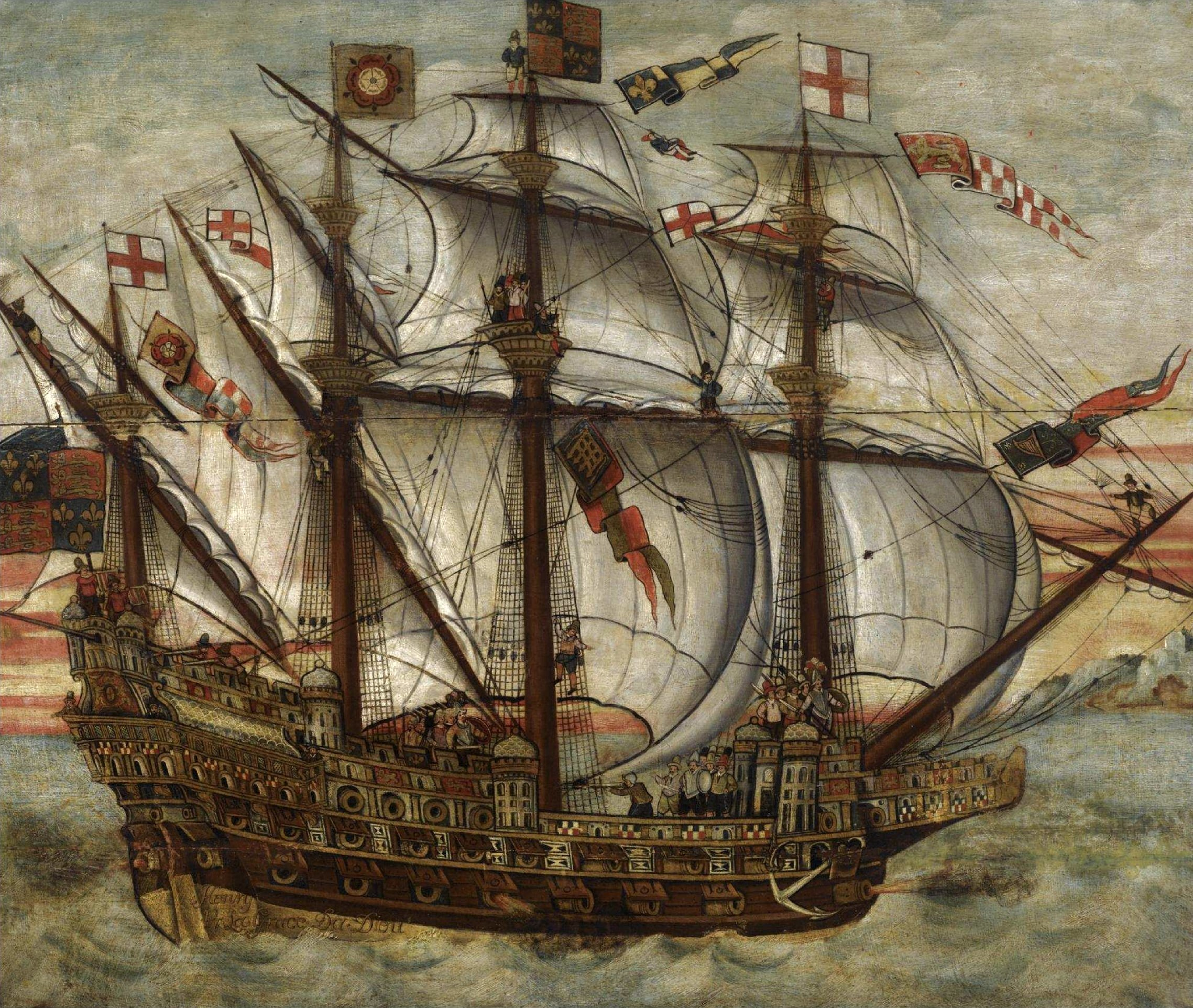
c. 1575 illustration of Henri Grâce à Dieu, launched at Woolwich Dockyard in 1514.

Woolwich Dockyard was founded by King Henry VIII in 1512 to build the new flagship of the Tudor navy, Henri Grâce à Dieu , the largest ship in the world when she was launched. The ship was built in Old Woolwich, which is where the dockyard was initially established: past Bell Water Gate, east of the area later known as Woolwich Dockyard. The site consisted of one or more rudimentary dry docks, a long storehouse (for canvas, rigging and other materials) and a small assortment of other buildings. Like its counterpart Deptford Dockyard, Woolwich was probably chosen for its position – on the south bank of the tidal River Thames conveniently close to Henry's palace at Greenwich – and for its proximity to deep water.

Several other ships were built here after Henri Grâce à Dieu, but in the 1520s shipbuilding appears to have ceased (the site may have been prone to flooding, a problem that caused the closure of another Royal Dockyard further downstream in Erith at around this time). By 1540, however, the royal shipwrights had begun operating on higher ground further to the west at what was to become the permanent site of the Dockyard, where a pair of dry docks (already in situ and known as "Boughton's Docks") formed the centre of operations. The site was purchased by the Crown in 1546 and in the second half of the century several sizeable ships were built there. The yard was also used for heavy repair work.

=== Early history ===
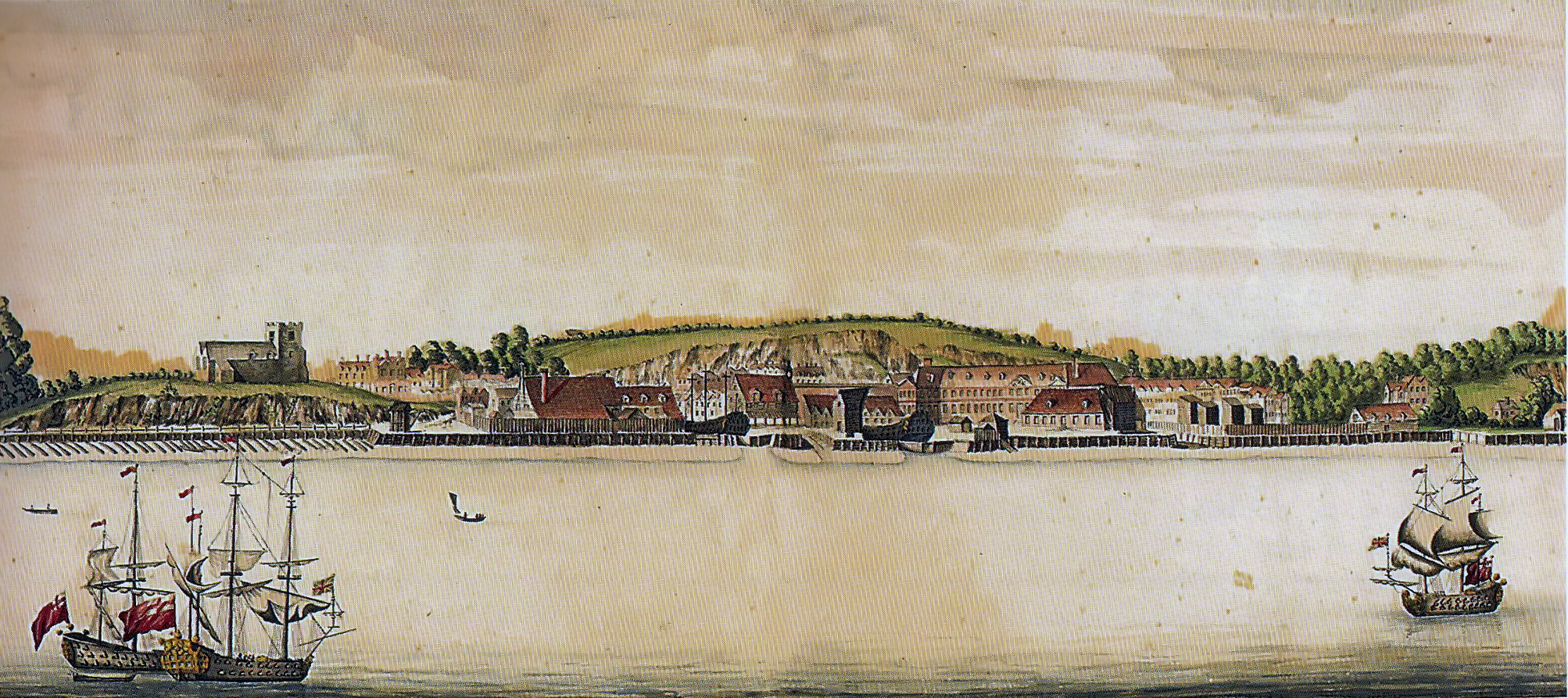
Woolwich Dockyard in 1698: the recently erected Great Storehouse (centre-right) dominates the built environment of the dockyard.

The two dry docks were rebuilt in the early 17th century (the first of several rebuildings) and the western dock was expanded, enabling it to accommodate two ships, end to end. In the years that followed, the dockyard was expanded; its facilities included slipways for shipbuilding, timber yards, saw pits, cranes, forges, a mast house and several storehouses. There were also houses on site for the senior officers of the yard. A clock house was built in 1670 (containing a mould loft for drawing up full-scale ship designs) and in 1698 a palatial Great Storehouse was erected. Apart from the brick-built mast house and Great Storehouse, the buildings were almost entirely of timber construction.

==== The Gun Wharf ====
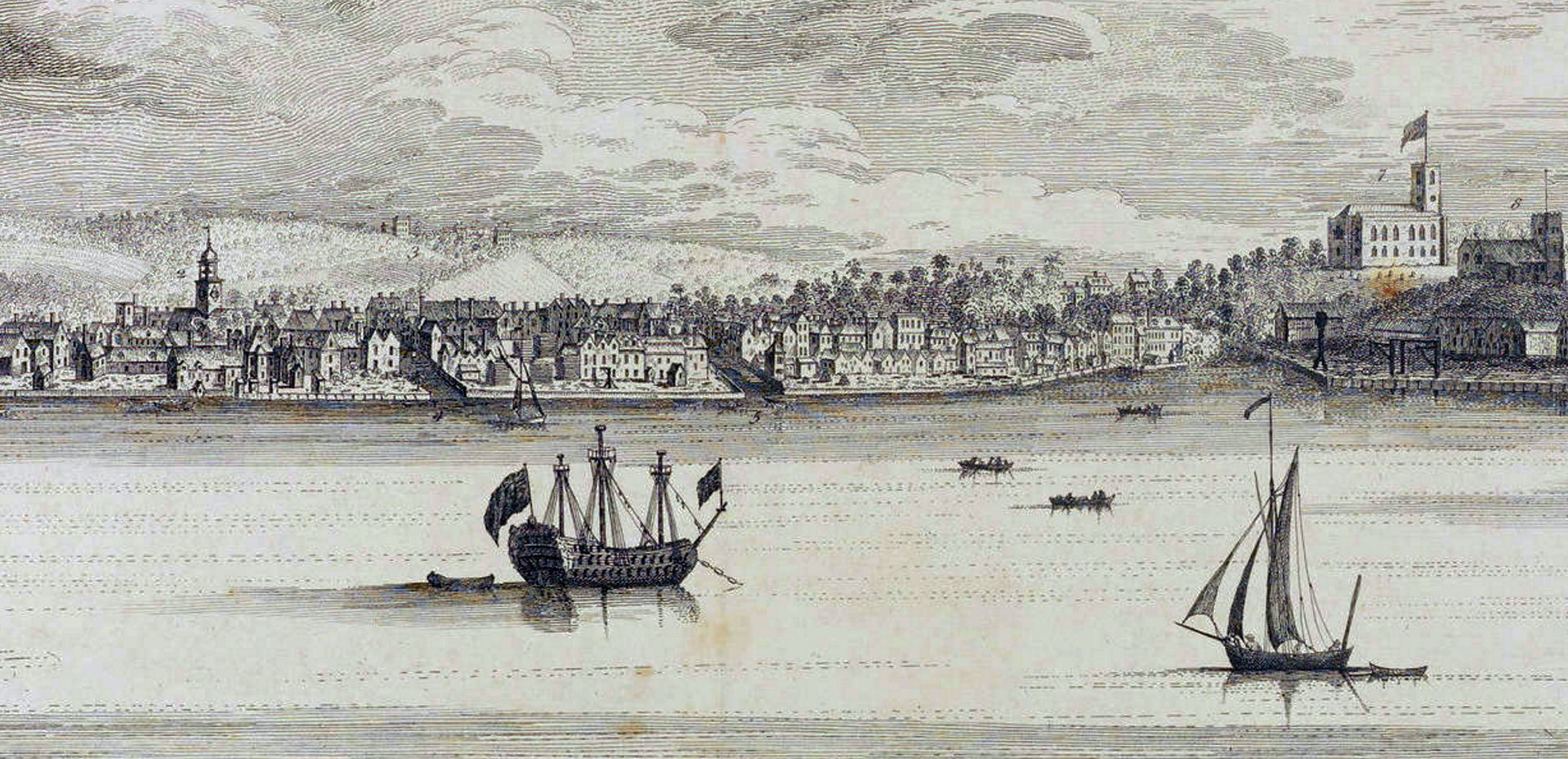
Old Woolwich as viewed from the river in 1739: Bell Water Gate is in the centre and the Gun Wharf centre-left. The clock tower (left) is part of the Ropeyard. (From an engraving by S & N Buck)

As at other Royal Dockyards, the Ordnance Office maintained a Gun Wharf at Woolwich for storage and provision of guns and ammunition for the ships based there. The Gun Wharf was sited east of Bell Water Gate (where there is now a car park next to the Waterfront Leisure Centre). It was here that Woolwich Dockyard had been founded in 1512 and the Great Harry was built in 1515; when the dockyard had moved to its new, permanent site in the 1540s, the old wharf, crane and storehouse had been given over to storage of heavy ordnance and other items. Gun carriage repair was also undertaken on site. Later, use of the Gun Wharf was shared with the nearby Royal Ropeyard, which maintained a storehouse there for hemp and other materials. The wharf and its buildings were improved and rebuilt at regular points through the 16th and 17th centuries; as late as 1664 a large new brick storehouse was provided "to lodge ships' carriages in".

The wharf was still subject to frequent flooding, however, and from the 1650s the Board of Ordnance began to make use of open land at Tower Place, to the east of the Gun Wharf, as a site for proving and storing cannons and other large guns. Known as 'The Warren', this was the beginning of what would later become the Woolwich Royal Arsenal. The Ordnance Office withdrew from Gun Wharf in 1671, but the Ropeyard continued to make use of the wharf and its associated storehouses into the 19th century.

==== The Ropeyard ====
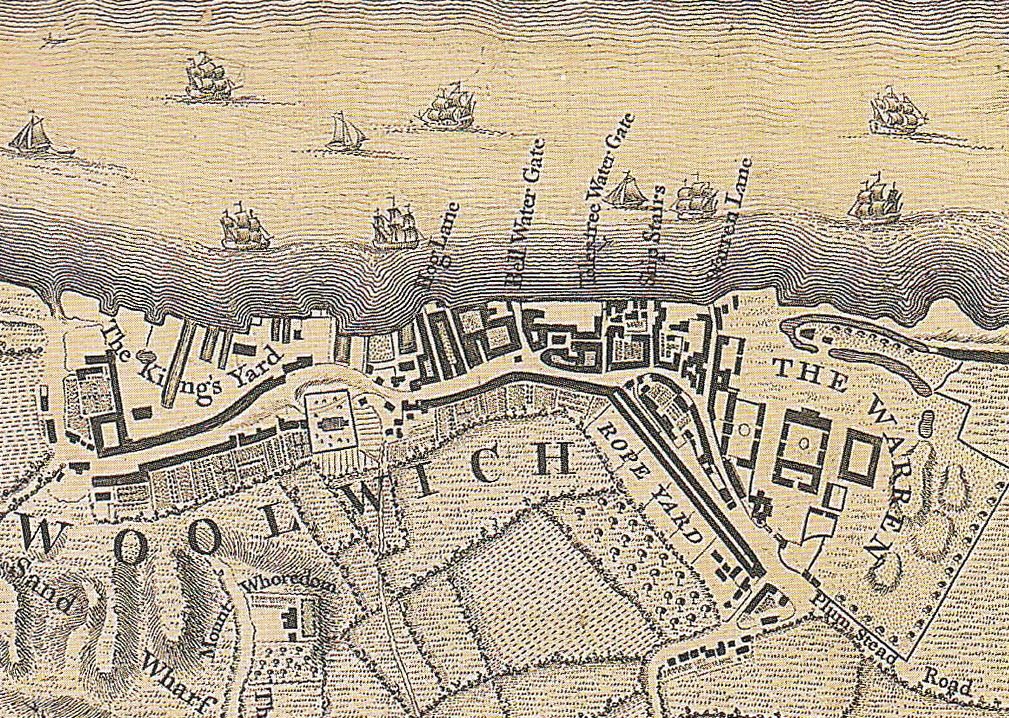
Map of 1746 showing 'The King's Yard' (left), old Woolwich (centre), the 'Rope Yard' and 'The Warren' (right).

In the 1570s the Crown established a naval Ropeyard in Woolwich, one of the largest in the world at the time. Too long to fit within the confines of the Dockyard, its parallel sheds lay along the line of present-day Beresford Street. As first built it consisted of a 600 ft 'cable house' along with a series of sheds accommodating different parts of the rope-making process. In 1695–1697 the ropeyard was largely rebuilt, under the supervision of Edmund Dummer; by the end of the century it included a double-ropewalk, 1061 ft long, a parallel single-ropewalk of similar length, a brick storehouse with a clock tower, houses for the yard's senior officers and various other buildings, all enclosed within a perimeter wall topped by watchtowers. Parts of the yard had to be rebuilt after a fire in 1759, and again after another fire in 1813. The ropeyard remained in service until 1832, by which time similar establishments in other Royal Dockyards had begun to come to the fore; the site having been sold in 1833, its buildings were demolished soon afterwards, in 1835.

=== Second golden age ===
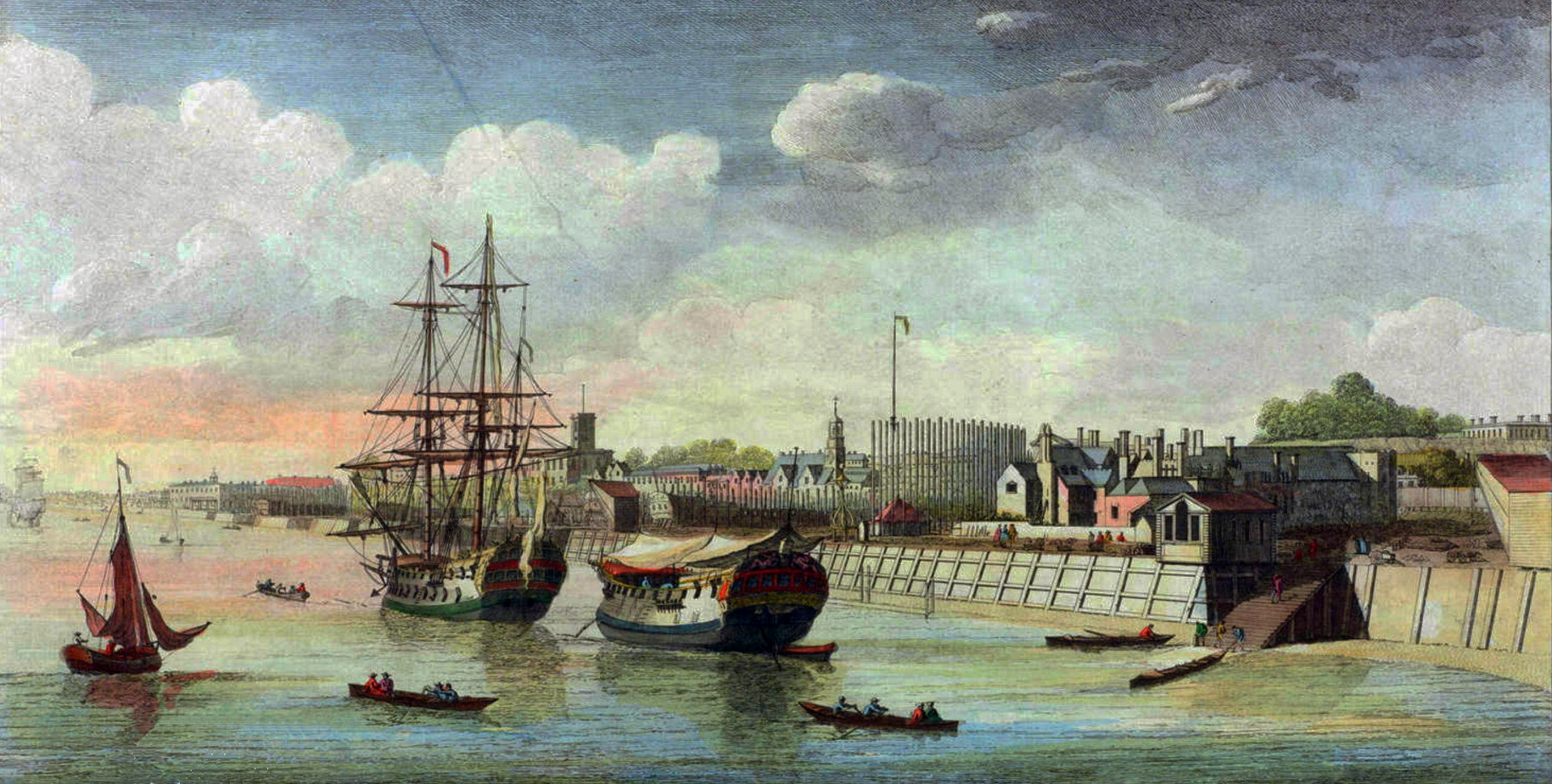
Woolwich Dockyard in 1750, by John Boydell.

The fortunes of the yard had waned toward the end of the seventeenth century; in 1688 its work was valued at £9,669, in contrast to nearby Deptford (£15,760), not to mention the (by now much larger) Royal Dockyards at Portsmouth (£35,045), and Chatham (£44,940). In the first half of the eighteenth century, however, it gained a renewed momentum: the site doubled in size, as did the workforce, and even in the first decade of the 1700s there were more ships launched from Woolwich than from any other English yard. Many buildings were built (or rebuilt) at this time, now mostly in brick. On newly acquired and reclaimed land to the east, three new slips were built and a new mast pond was created, along with adjacent mast houses and boat sheds; a sizeable rigging house was also built here. Alongside the Great Storehouse an equally large building, housing both a sail loft and a mould loft, was constructed in 1740. Meanwhile, land acquired to the west enabled a new terrace of officers' houses to be built in the early 1750s.

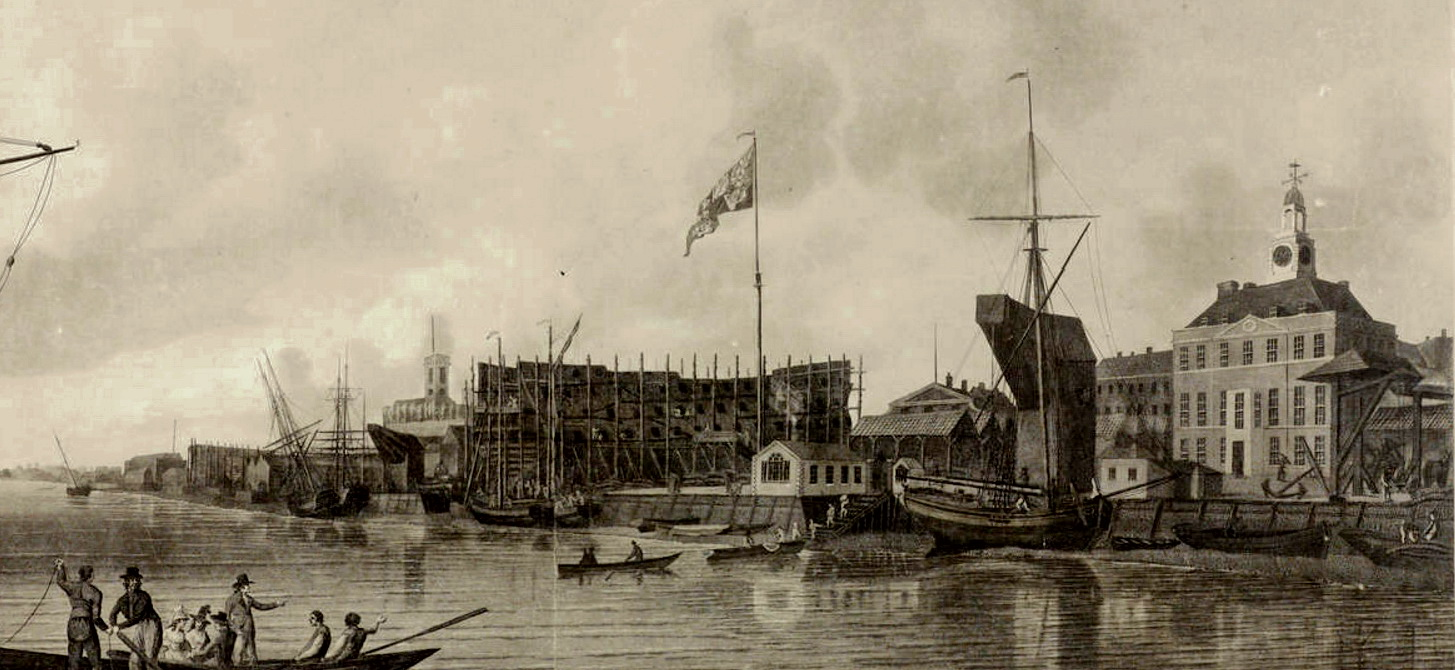
Woolwich Dockyard, 1789 (by Robert Dodd) showing the newly built clock house

The yard was further expanded westwards in the 1780s, again almost doubling in size. Much of the area of the expanded dockyard was preserved as open ground for storage of timber, with rows of wooden seasoning sheds; as the Navy's ships were growing in size and number, more raw materials were needed across the Royal Dockyards. Two new mast ponds were constructed, replacing a pond at the eastern end of the site which dated from 1720 but was now considered too small (the new ponds and mast houses could accommodate mast lengths of up to 120 feet (37 m)); the old pond, together with its associated buildings, was now given over to the construction and storage of ship's boats. Centrally positioned in the expanded yard, a new clock house was built, containing offices for the various departments of the dockyard, and with it a new main gateway (replacing the old entrance which had been located further to the east).

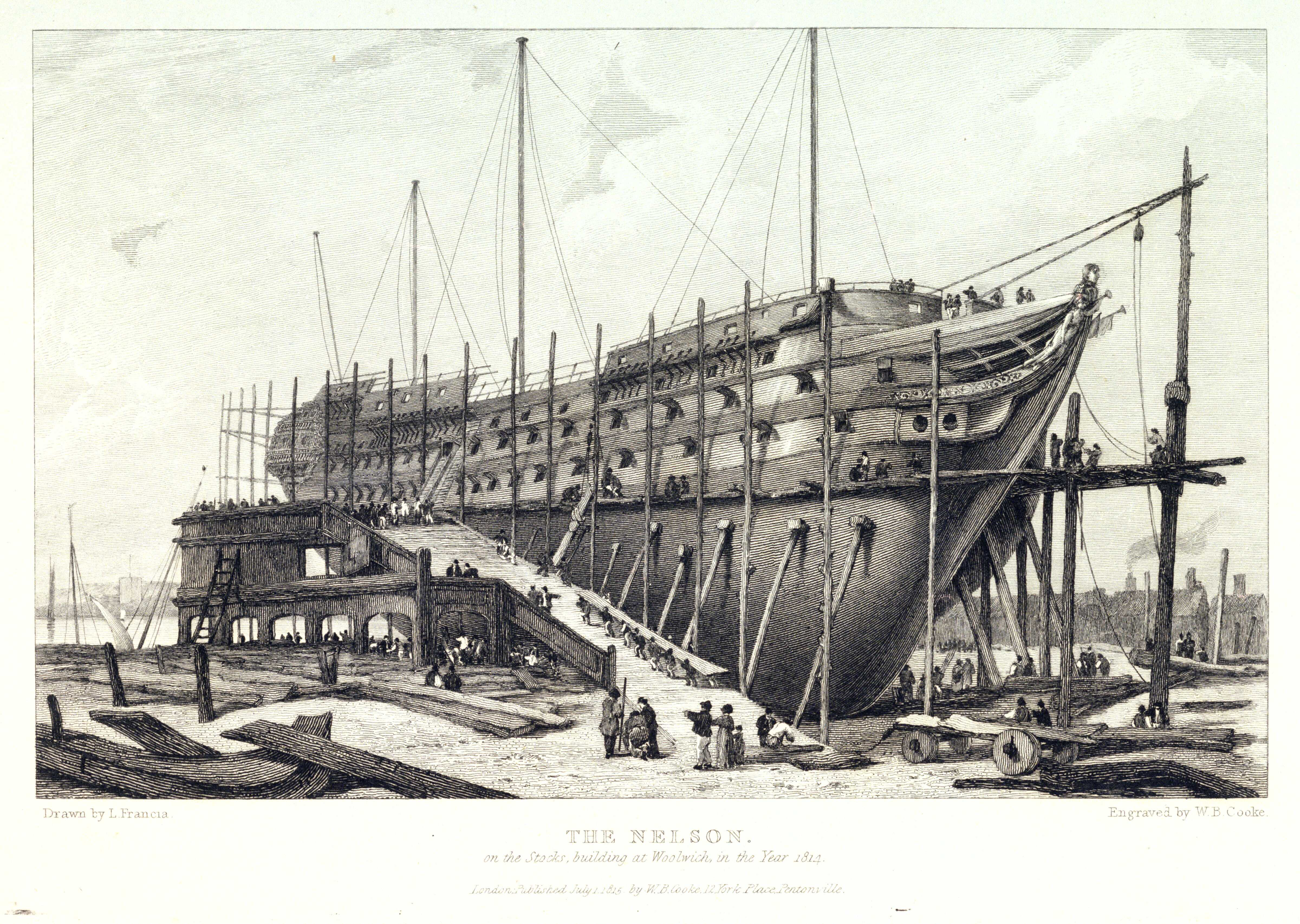
HMS Nelson under construction at Woolwich Dockyard in 1814

Later, Shipbuilding continued in earnest during the Napoleonic Wars; but, as ships grew still bigger, the Thames continued to silt up. In 1800 Samuel Bentham, the Inspector-General of Naval Works (who had himself served as an apprentice shipwright at Woolwich in the 1770s) proposed replacing Woolwich, Deptford, Chatham and Sheerness dockyards with a single new facility on the Isle of Grain; but this, (along with other radical proposals) was not pursued. In 1802 a steam-driven bucket dredger was brought into service at Woolwich (prior to this, convicts had been used to dredge the quayside by hand) but still the silting persisted; nevertheless, the yard continued to be developed: in 1814 a large smithery or metal-working factory was added to produce anchors and other iron items. In the 1820s two new covered slips were added (No.1 and No.2 Slips) large enough to accommodate the latest ship designs. The following decade a substantial part of the river wall was rebuilt in brick and the two dry docks were reconstructed in granite in the 1830s–1840s. Alongside the docks a steam-powered saw-mill was provided, a new workshop with steam hammers and a hydraulic chain and cable testing facility.

=== The Steam Factory and last years of the Dockyard ===
Map of the Dockyard in 1854

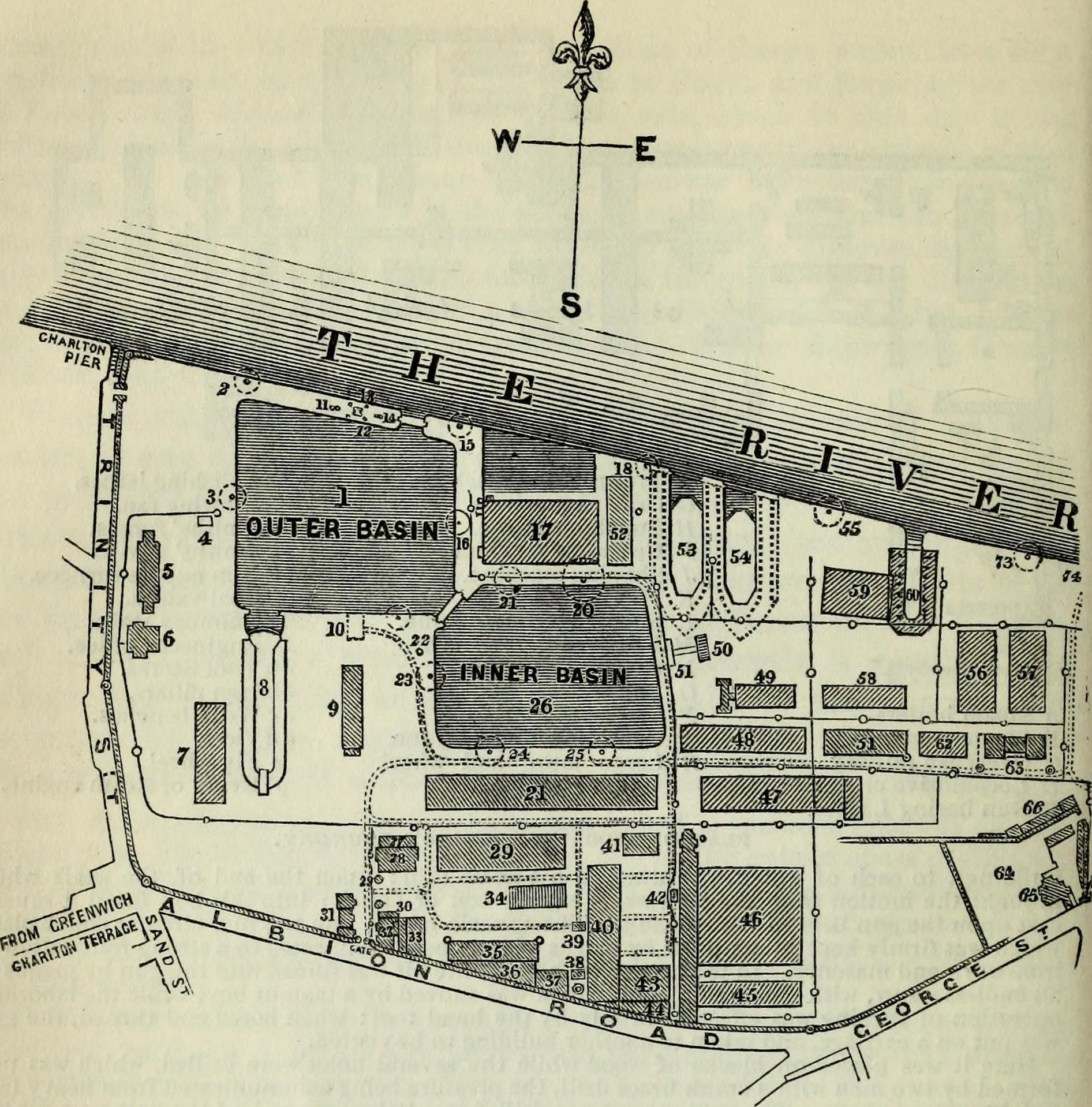
The steam factory complex is just south of the Inner Basin.

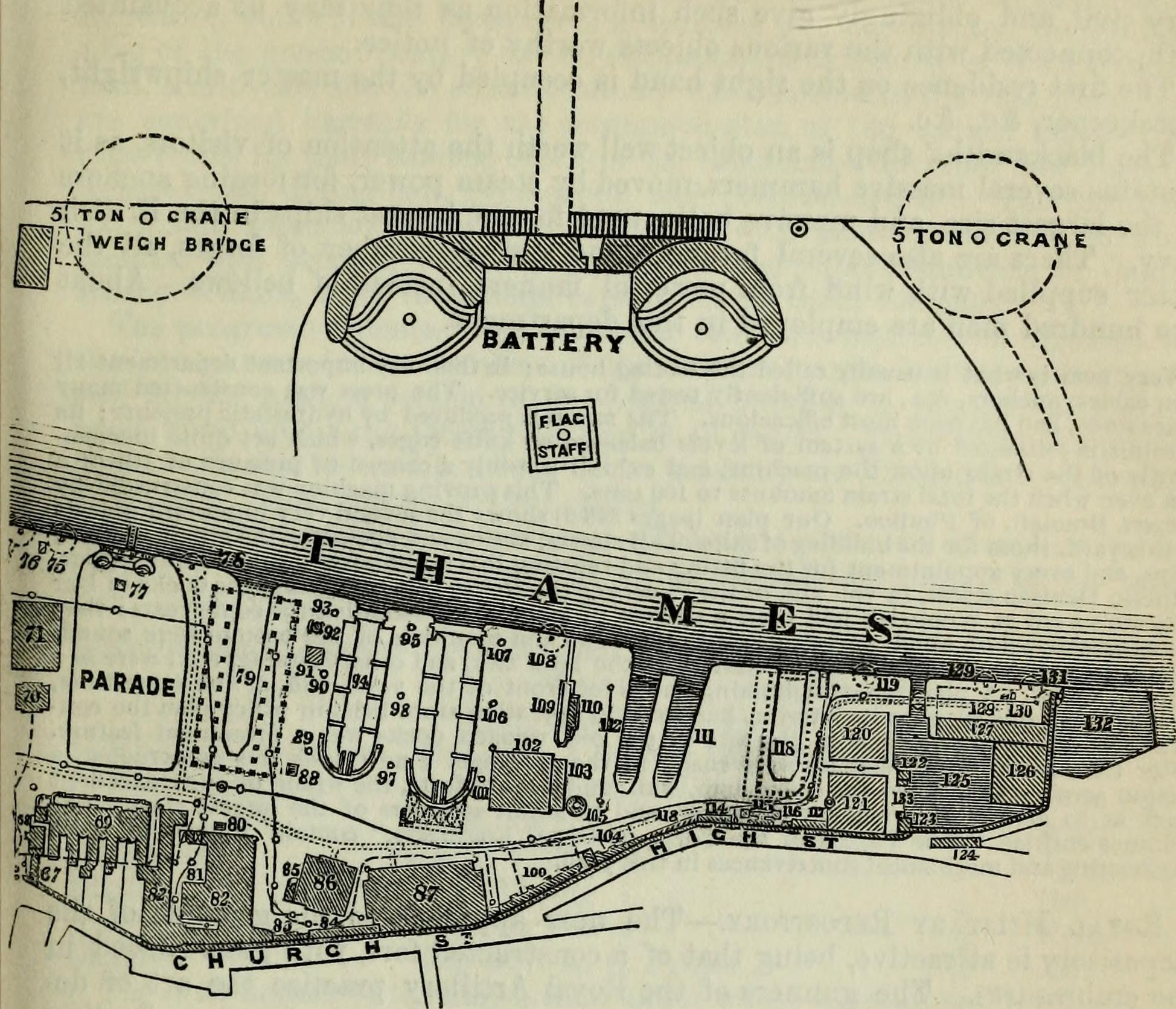
The gun battery (shown enlarged) is located just north of the 'Parade'.

From 1831, Woolwich found a new lease of life as a specialist yard for marine steam engineering (a relatively new technology which was being developed commercially at nearby Millwall). New buildings were constructed on the site for steam manufacturing and maintenance, including a boiler shop for manufacturing boilers, foundries for brass, copper and iron work, and an erecting shop for assembling the steam engines; by 1843 all were integrated into a single factory complex, with a single large chimney drawing on all the various forges and furnaces by way of underground flues. Integral to the creation of the steam factory was the conversion of two mast ponds (which lay to the north of what is now Ruston Road) into steam basins, where ships could moor alongside the factory while their engines and boilers were fitted. One of these basins was provided with its own dry dock (No. 1 Dock) which, like the basins, was filled in and built over in the 20th century. The factory was part of the dockyard, but had a high degree of independence: it was accessed by its own gate (known as the West Gate or Steam Factory Gate) and overseen by its own official, the Chief Engineer.

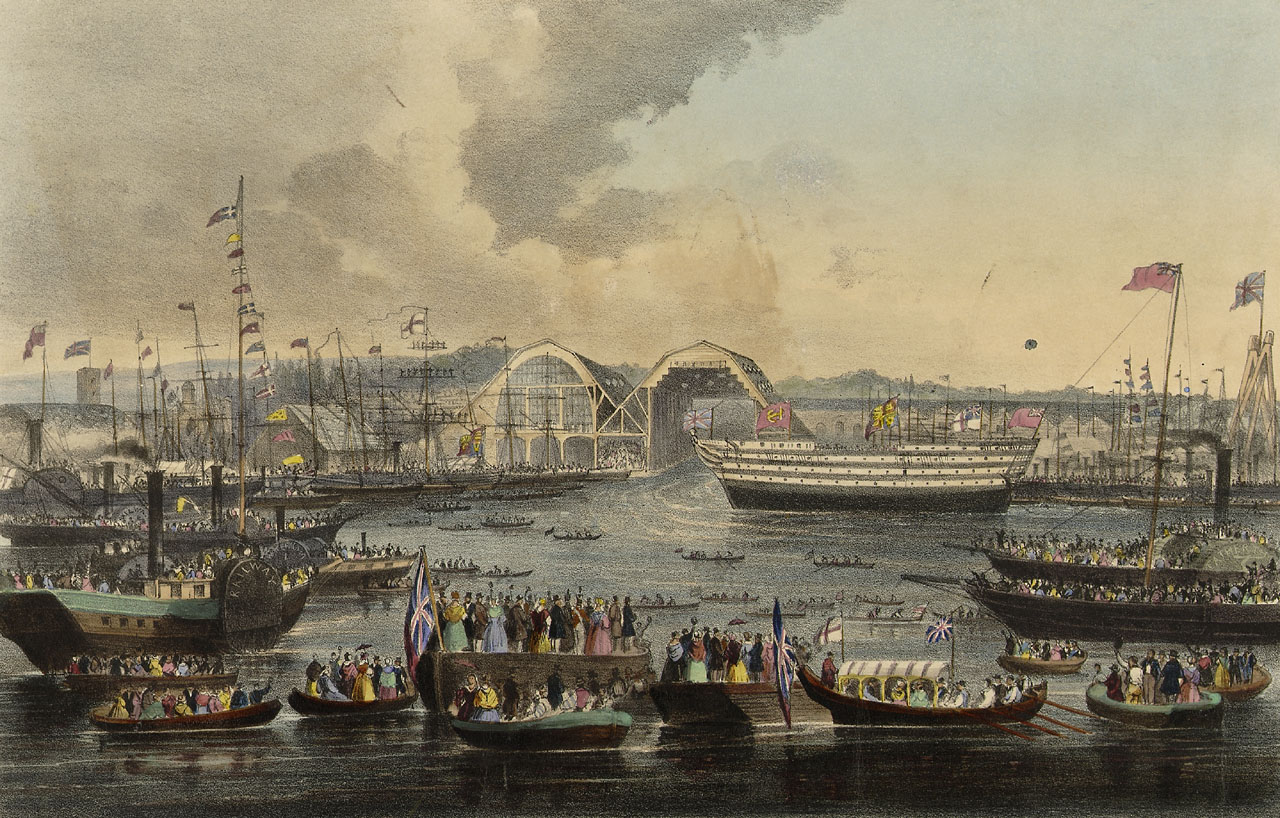
The launch of HMS Trafalgar, Woolwich, June 21st 1841. The ship, launched from No.1 Slip, is to the right (with the Steam Factory visible behind); St Mary's Church tower and the clock house can be seen to the left.

Woolwich retained its primacy as the Navy's steam engineering yard through the 1840s, but following the establishment of large-scale steam yards at Portsmouth (1848) and Devonport (1853) it became increasingly redundant, especially as its basins were no longer large enough for the size of ships now being built. Older ships still came to Woolwich for engine repairs and maintenance, but by the end of the Crimean War the steam factory's days were numbered. Surprisingly though, the dockyard had managed to remain active in shipbuilding and its facilities continued to be upgraded and expanded through the 1850s and early 1860s; during that time a new rolling mill and an armour plate shop were built as well as a sizeable new sail loft and rigging store. Ultimately, though, the yard could not keep pace with the emerging needs of the new ironclad warships, and by 1865 it was clear that both Woolwich and Deptford Dockyards were destined for closure.

=== Administration of the dockyard ===
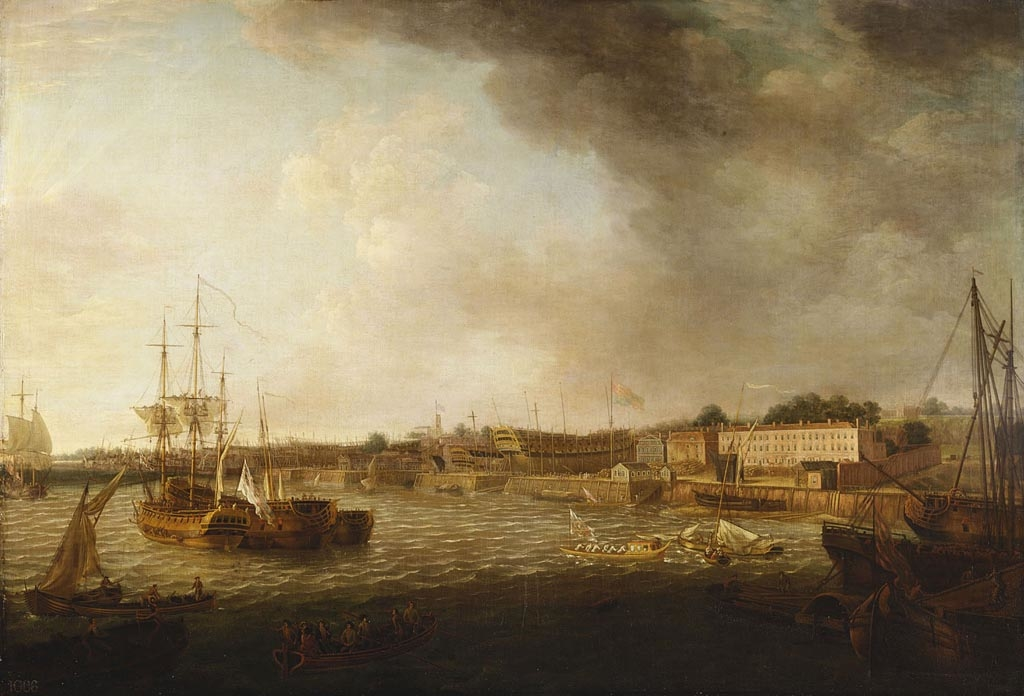
The Dockyard c. 1780, by Richard Paton. Senior officers of the yard lived in the Terrace (the building shown on the far right of the picture).

From 1630 until 1688 the Master Shipwright was the key official at the dockyard until the introduction of resident commissioners by the Navy Board after which he became deputy to the resident commissioner. The Commissioner of the Navy at Woolwich Dockyard held a seat and a vote on the Navy Board in London. In 1748 the dockyard was managed directly by the Navy Board. In 1832 the post of commissioner was replaced by the post of captain-superintendent, who was invested with the same power and authority as the former commissioners, "except in matters requiring an Act of Parliament to be submitted by the Commissioner of the Navy".

==== Master shipwright, Woolwich Dockyard ====
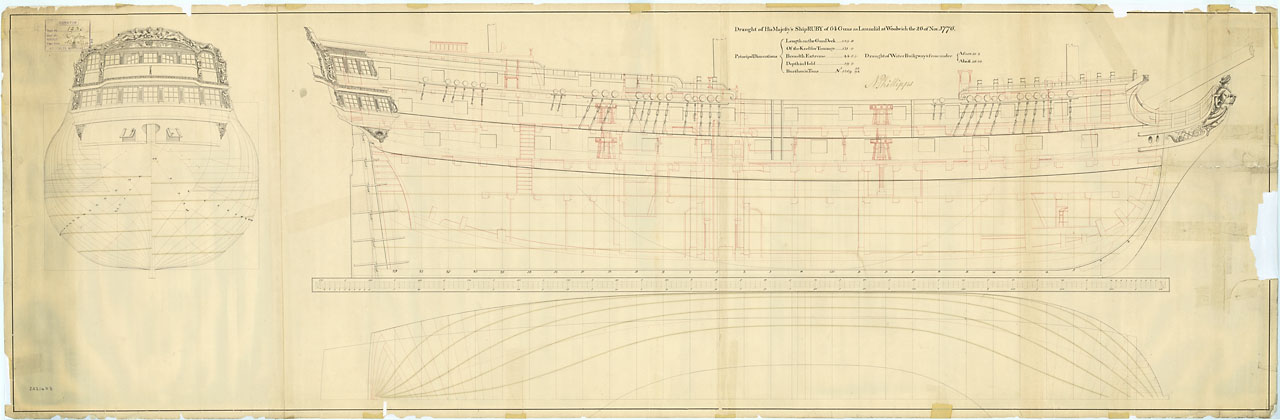
Designs for HMS Ruby (1776) signed N. Phillipps, Master Shipwright

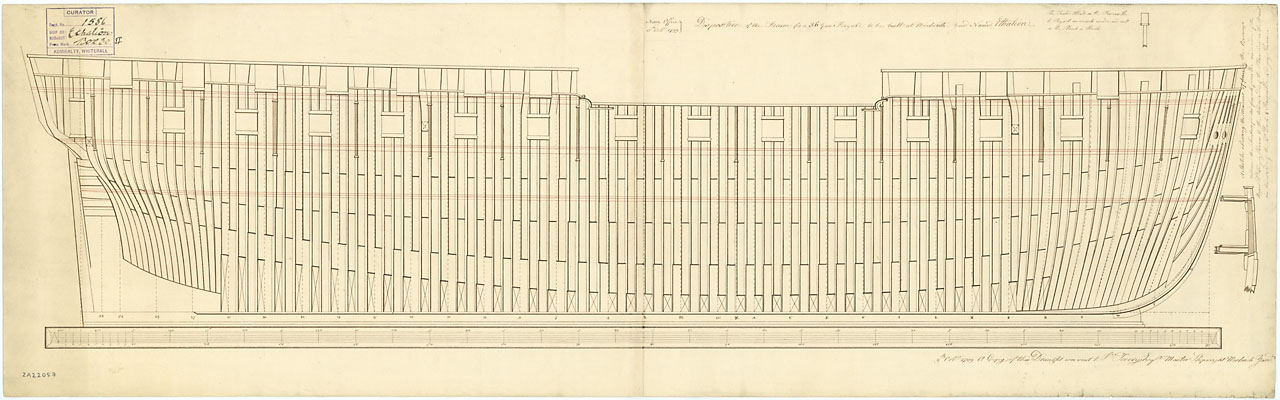
Framing profile for HMS Ethalion (1802)

Designs for HMS Redoubtable (1815)

Post holders included:

1. Peter Pett, 1630–1652
2. Christopher Pett, 1652–1668
3. Jonas Shish, 1668–1675
4. Phineas Pett, 1675–1678
5. Thomas Shish, 1678–1685
6. Joseph Lawrence, 1686–1697
7. Samuel Miller, 1697–1699
8. William Lee, 1700–1701
9. Joseph Allin, November–March 1705
10. Richard Stacey, 1705–1709
11. Jacob Ackworth, 1709–1714
12. John Naish, 1714–1715
13. John Hayward, 1715–1727
14. John Hayward, 1727–1741
15. John Holland, 1742–1745
16. Thomas Fellowes, 1746–1752
17. Thomas Slade Thomas, May 1752 – June 1752
18. Adam Hayes, June 1752 – February 1753
19. Edward Allin, March 1753 – December 1755
20. Israel Pownoll, December 1755 – May 1762
21. Joseph Harris, June 1762 – May 1767.
22. William Gray, July 1767 – July 1773
23. Nicholas Phillipps, 1773–1778
24. George White, January–April 1779
25. John Jenner, April 1779 – December 1782
26. Henry Peake, December 1782 – November 1785
27. Martin Ware, December 1785 – March 1787
28. John Nelson, March 1787 – March 1790
29. William Rule, April–August 1790
30. John Tovery, 1793–1801
31. Edward Sison, 1801–1816
32. Henry Canham, April 1816 – July 1826
33. Oliver Lang, 1826–1853
34. William M. Rice, April 1853–1859
35. George Turner, July 1859–1866

==== Commissioner of the navy at Woolwich Dockyard ====
Post holders included:

1. Baltasar St Mitchell, 1688–1702
2. Henry Greenhill, 1702–1744
3. Thomas Whorwood, 1744–1745
4. Edward Falkingham, 1745–1746
5. James Compton, 1746–1747
6. William Davies, 1747–1748
  Note: From 1748 to 1806 the yard was managed directly by the Navy Board.
7. Captain Charles Cunningham, 1806–1828 (Charles Cunningham was also commissioner at Chatham in March 1828).

==== Captains and Commodores Superintendent, Woolwich Dockyard ====
Post holders included:

1. Captain Samuel Warren, C.B., 1828–1838
2. Captain Phipps Hornby, C.B., 1838–1841
3. Captain (Commodore from 1844) Sir Francis A. Collier, C.B., 1841–1846
4. Commodore Sir James. J. G. Bremer, K.C.B., K.C.H., 1846–1848
5. Commodore Henry Eden, 1848–1853
6. Commodore John Shepherd, 1853–58
7. Commodore the Hon. James Robert Drummond, C.B., 1858–1861
8. Commodore Sir F. W. E. Nicholson, Bart, 1861–1864
9. Commodore Hugh Dunlop, C.B., 1864–1866
10. Commodore William Edmonstone, 1866–1869

=== Notable ships launched at the dockyard ===
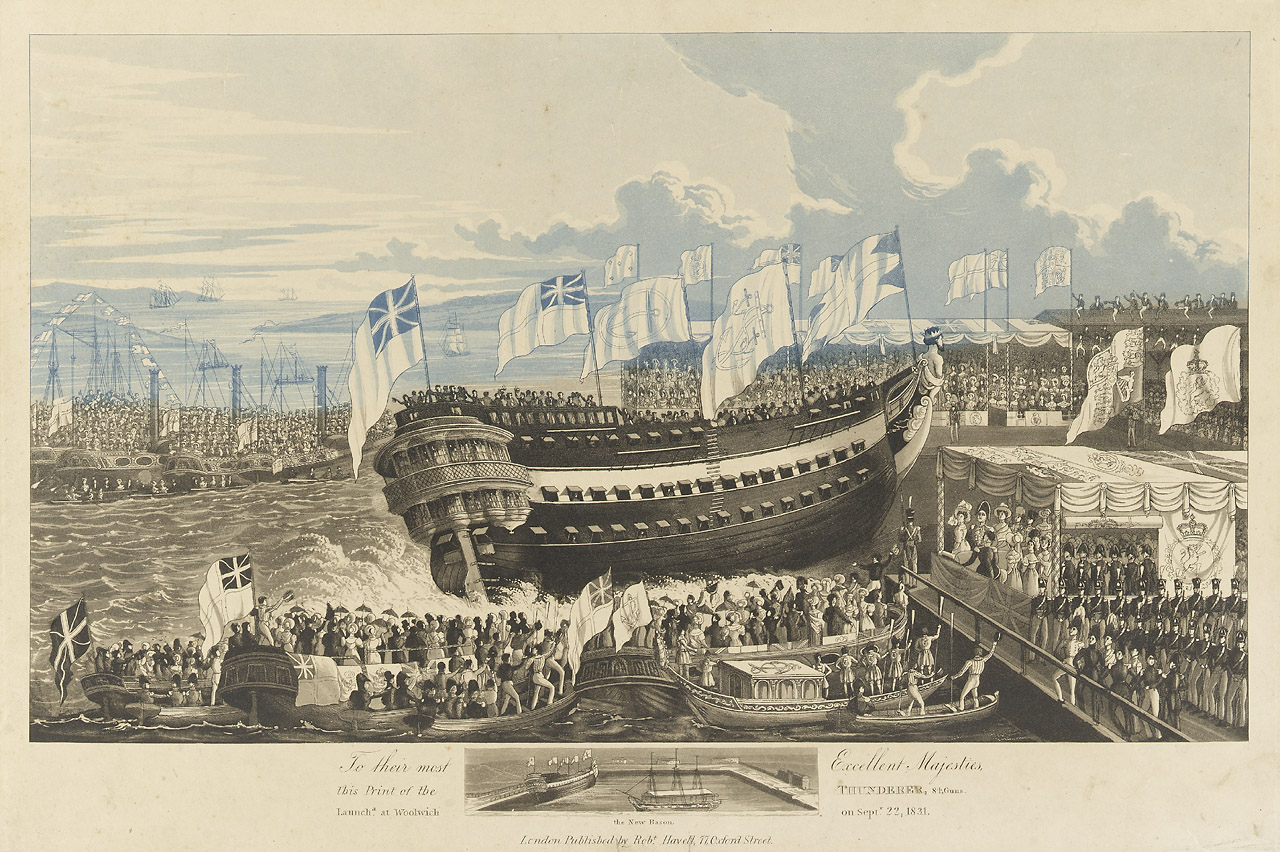
Launch of HMS Thunderer, Woolwich, September 22nd 1831

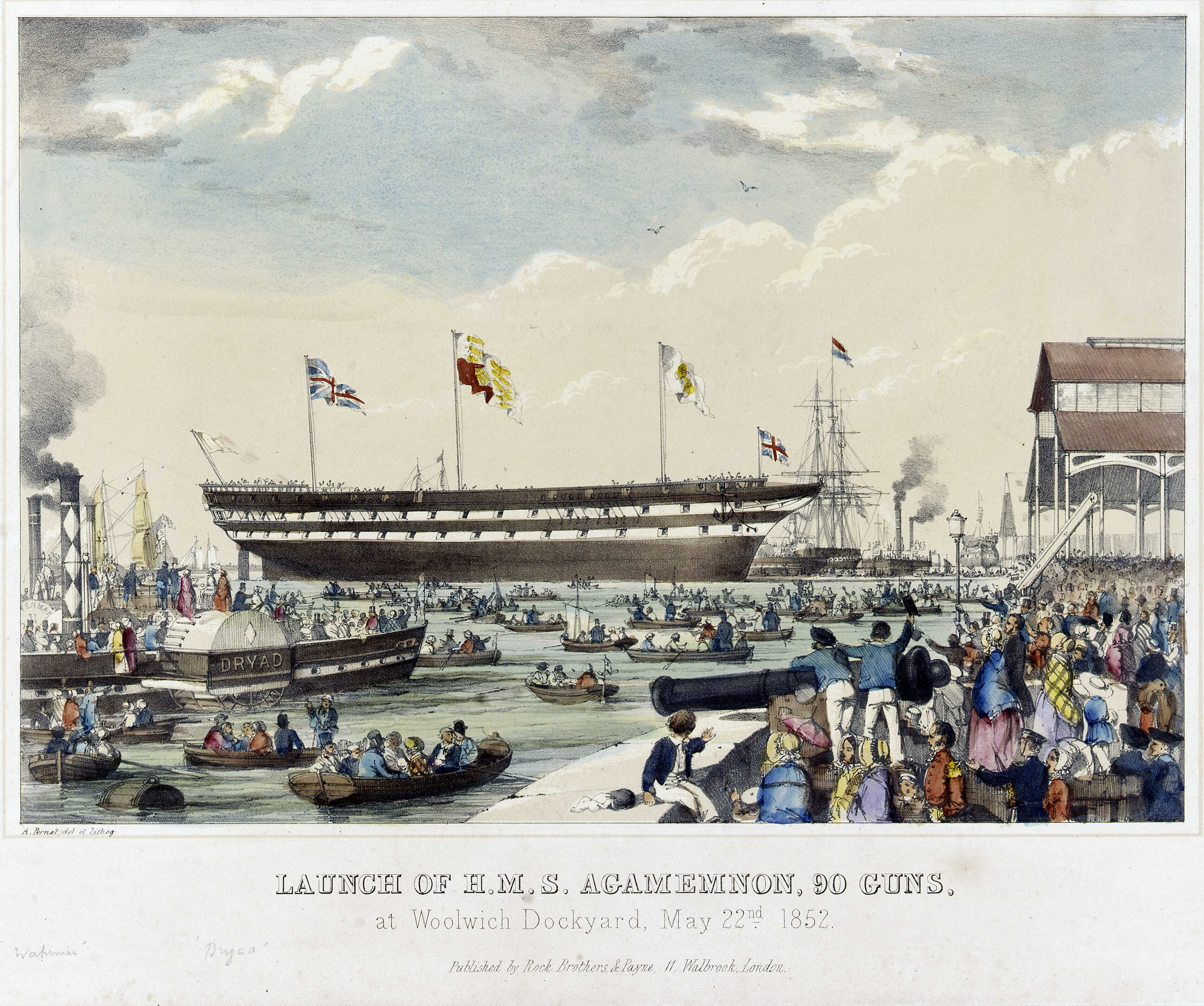
Launch of HMS Agamemnon, Woolwich, May 22nd 1852

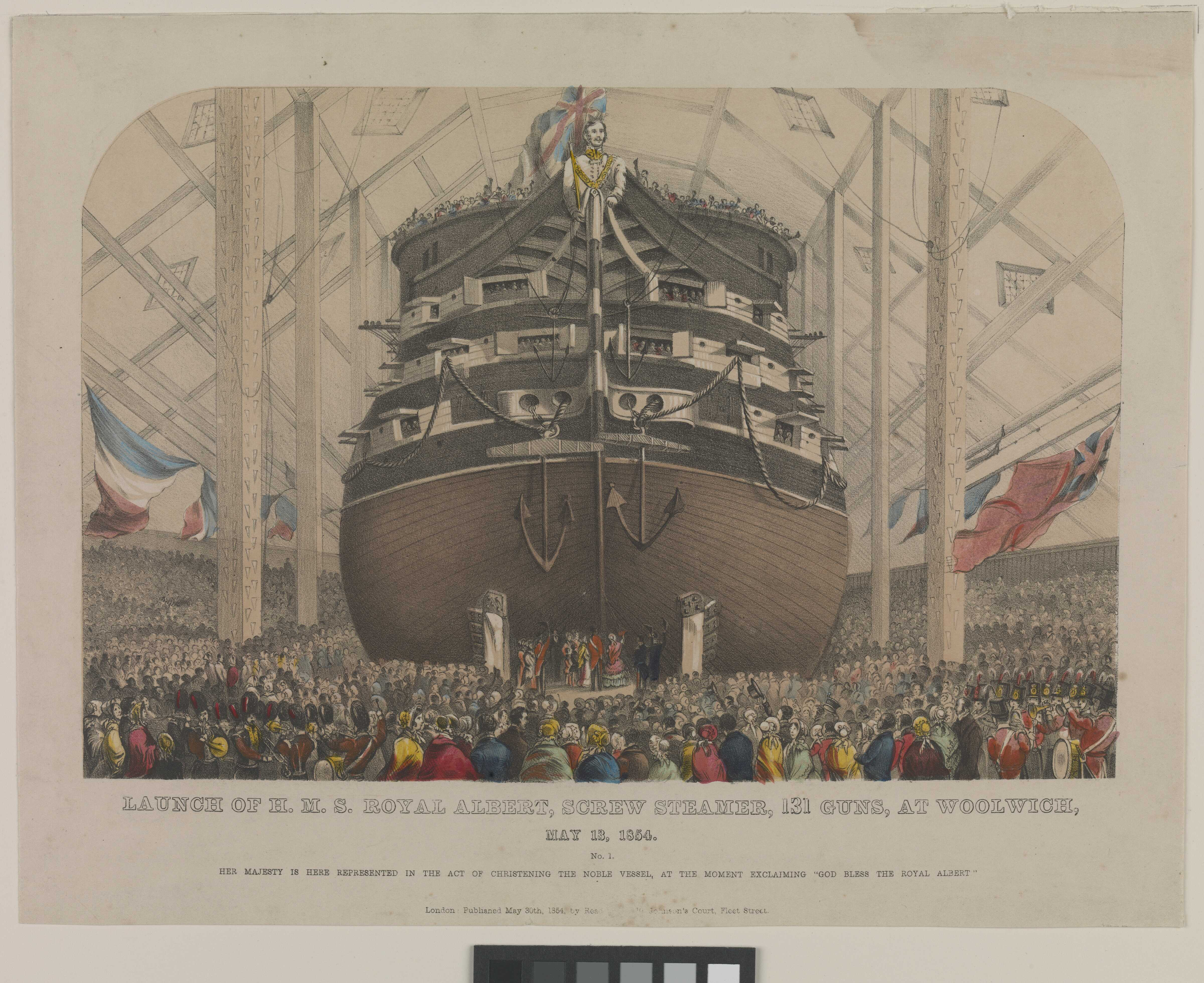
Launch of HMS Royal Albert, Woolwich, May 13th, 1854

- 1512–14 – Henri Grâce à Dieu (Great Harry); flagship of Henry VIII
- 1557–59 – Elizabeth Jonas (the Elizabeth); fought against the Armada in 1588; rebuilt in 1597–98; broken up in 1618
- 1586 – Vanguard – the first Royal Navy ship to bear this name
- 1608 – Ark Royal – a rebuilding
- 1610 – Prince Royal
- 1613 – Defiance – a rebuilding
- 1615 – Merhonour – a rebuilding
- 1616 – Convertine – originally begun as the private warship Destiny for Sir Walter Raleigh
- 1617 – Rainbow – a rebuilding
- 1631 – Vanguard – a rebuilding
- 1637 – Sovereign of the Seas; first-rate ship of the line, ordered by Charles I
- 1655 – Naseby, later renamed Royal Charles
- 1658 – Richard later renamed Royal James
- 1670 – HMS Saint Andrew; first-rate ship of the line, later renamed HMS Royal Anne
- 1701 – HMS Royal Sovereign; first-rate ship of the line
- 1751 – HMS Dolphin; circumnavigated the globe twice
- 1756 – HMS Royal George; first-rate ship of the line; her sinking in 1782 was one of the worst disasters in Royal Navy history – around 800 lives were lost
- 1783 – HMS Europa – 50 gun Fourth-rate, used by Joseph Whidbey and George Vancouver to conduct a survey of Port Royal, Jamaica in 1793
- 1805 – HMS Ocean; second-rate ship of the line, flagship of Lord Collingwood
- 1809 – HMS Macedonian; frigate captured by USS United States during the War of 1812
- 1814 – HMS Nelson; a 126-gun first-rate ship of the line of the Royal Navy
- 1818 – HMS Talavera; third-rate ship of the line
- 1820 – HMS Beagle; ship used on naturalist Charles Darwin's famous voyage
- 1846 – HMS Niger, ship used for trials to prove the superiority of screw propulsion
- 1852 – HMS Agamemnon, the first British battleship to be designed and built from the keel up with installed steam power
- 1854 – HMS Royal Albert, screw steamer with 131 guns
- 1868 – HMS Repulse, the last wooden battleship constructed for the Royal Navy
- 1868 – HM Floating Dry Dock 8,200 tonnes [Constructed of iron for HM Dockyard Bermuda]

=== Closure and aftermath ===
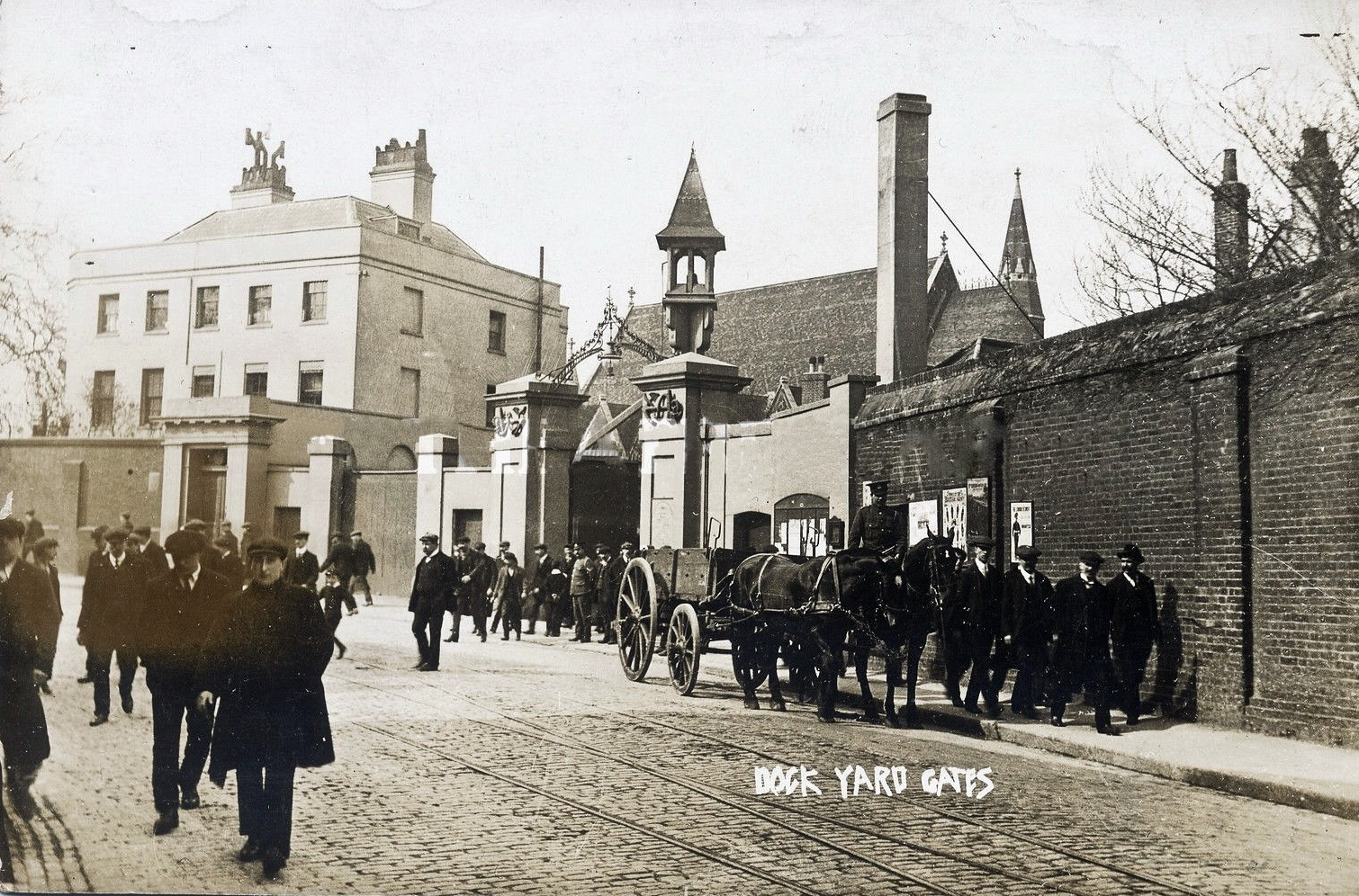
Main gate, c. 1900. Beyond is the Commodore-superintendent's residence (demolished c.1970) and the Dockyard Church (by Gilbert Scott, 1856), taken down and rebuilt as St Barnabas's, Eltham in 1932.

Woolwich Dockyard finally closed in 1869; however, although the easternmost part of the site was sold, everything west of No. 5 Slip (i.e. over 90% of the area) was retained by the War Office (which continued to refer to it as 'Woolwich Dockyard' and 'Royal Dockyard, Woolwich' until relinquishing ownership of the site a century later).

The eastern area today known as Mast Quay was sold by auction in 1872. Royal Dockard Wharf was used by a timber and slate merchant, E. Arnold & Co, in the 1870s. By 1919, the site was occupied by W.R. Cunis Ltd, owners of dredgers, tugs and barges, which used the wharves and slips for repairing their vessels. Cunis later (1971) formed Cubow Ltd, a joint venture with Hay's Wharf Ltd, to build boats, including substantial sailing vessels of up to 1,000 tons, a 1973 fishing trawler later chartered by the Ministry of Defence for use as a minesweeper (HMS David), a cargo vessel (Ambience), the Naticia (a London leisure cruise boat) and the Beagle, still in use around the Galápagos Islands in 2023. The area was last used for boat repair work in the 1990s.

==== War Office use of the site ====
After closure, much of the retained land went on to be used as storage space for the Ordnance Stores Department, based at the nearby Royal Arsenal; general items (including barrack stores, accoutrements and harness) were moved to the Dockyard, while 'warlike stores' remained in the Arsenal. Warehouses were built across much of the site and existing buildings were converted to provide storage space; there were also workshops on site for manufacturing harnesses, saddlery and the like. A railway system served the complex, part narrow-gauge, part standard-gauge, the latter linked (by way of a tunnel under Woolwich Church Street) to the North Kent Line (which was in turn linked into the Royal Arsenal Railway). The tunnel remains in situ for use by pedestrians. The dockyard church was used as a garrison chapel by the infantry quartered nearby in Cambridge Barracks.

From 1878 part of the Dockyard was given over for the Commissariat Reserve Stores; over the next decade it became the main supply depot providing food and forage for overseas garrisons and expeditionary forces. During the Sudan Campaign a very large forage store was built on the site, with hydraulic equipment for compressing and bailing hay. Briefly, from September 1888, the Commissariat and Transport Corps had its Regimental Headquarters in the Dockyard, but the following year the corps became the Army Service Corps with its headquarters in Aldershot.

In 1889 an Inspectorate of Royal Engineer Stores (IRES) was established at Woolwich Dockyard (an early example of independent quality assurance), which had 'custody of a complete set of sealed patterns for all items of Royal Engineer equipment' and responsibility for 'the preparation of detailed specifications to govern manufacture'. It remained based in the Dockyard, and was later renamed the Inspectorate of Engineers and Signal Stores (IESS) in 1936, and the Inspectorate of Electrical and Mechanical Equipment (IEME) in 1941. The Chief Inspector of General Stores (later styled Chief Inspector of Equipment and Stores) was also based there from the 1890s, as was the Superintending Engineer and Constructor of Shipping (who supervised, across various different shipyards, the construction of vessels for the War Department Fleet).

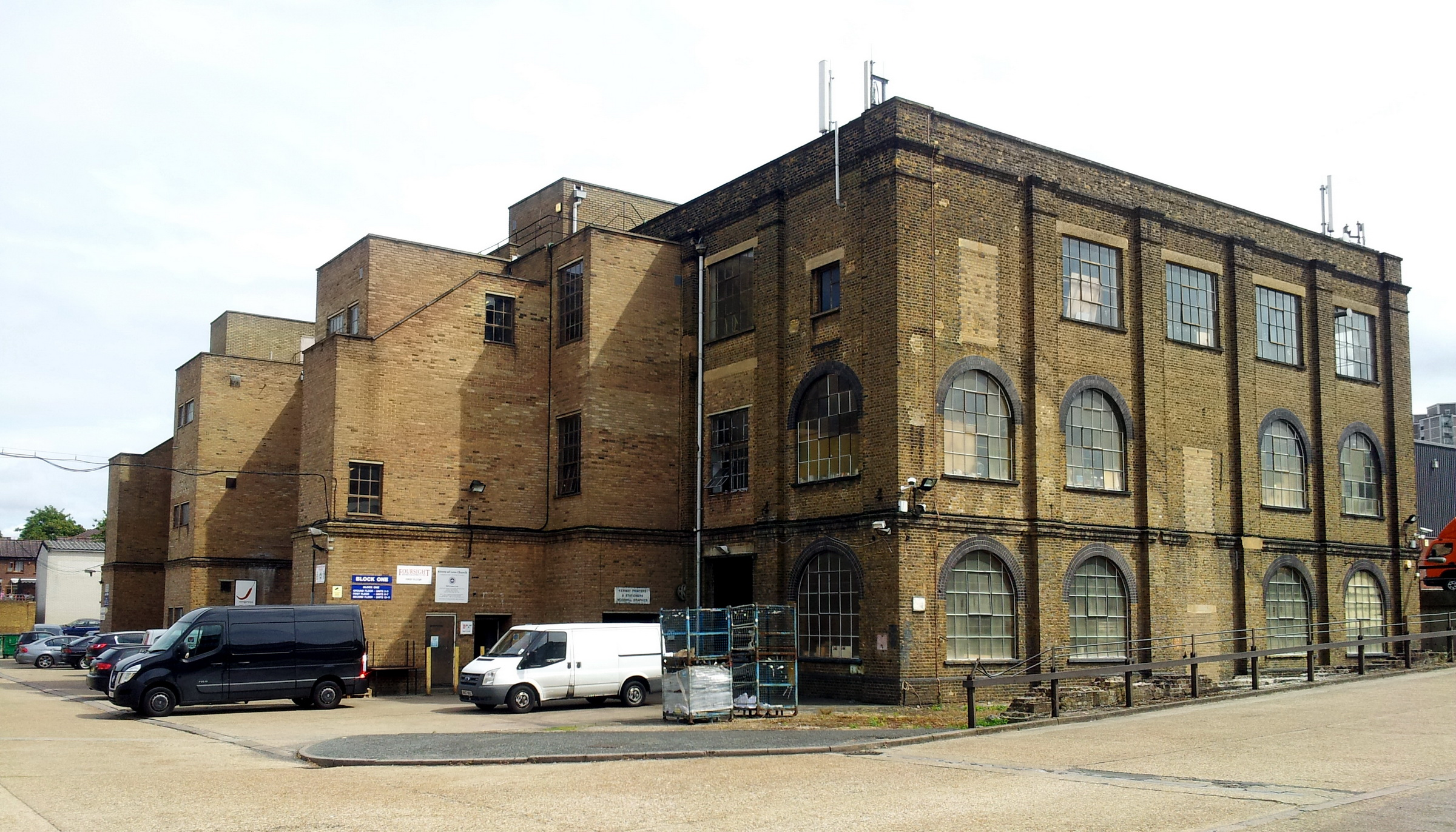
Warehouse (1914) dating from the site's use as a military store

During the First World War the dockyard remained operational as an Army Ordnance Depot and ASC Supply Reserve Depot. It also accommodated the country's largest Army Pay Office, the headquarters of the War Office Inspection Department, and the Records Offices of the Army Service Corps and the Army Ordnance Corps.

Following the outbreak of the Second World War, stores and facilities were removed from Woolwich Dockyard in an attempt to protect them from aerial bombardment. Later on, military activity resumed in the Dockyard: from 1942 it served as a Central Repair Depot of the Royal Army Ordnance Corps, and at the same time the Royal Army Service Corps established its main Boat Stores Depot there. In time, the repair function of these corps was taken over by the Royal Electrical and Mechanical Engineers.

==== Gradual military withdrawal ====
In 1926 the western part of the site was sold to the Royal Arsenal Co-operative Society; the Co-Op still occupies a number of buildings on the site. The older, eastern portion of the site remained in Ministry of Defence hands, used for storage, workshops and offices, until the closure of the Royal Arsenal in the 1960s. (The Royal Electrical and Mechanical Engineers, one of the last military units on site, moved out in 1966, taking with them the muster-bell and mast that had stood inside the main gate; it was re-erected at their depot at Arborfield, where it was rung for church services; in 2016 it was scheduled to move with the corps to their new headquarters at MoD Lyneham.)

==== Redevelopment ====
Thereafter the older part of the dockyard was turned into a housing estate by Greenwich London Borough Council in the early 1970s. In the 1980s and 1990s the Thames Path was extended to the area (along the riverside between Warspite Road and the Woolwich Ferry carpark; it is also part of the NCN1 and C14 cycle routes). Various housing projects have encroached on the historic character of the area. Two towers with luxury apartments were built at Mast Quay around 2005, with even taller towers being projected in 2015.

The second phase of Mast Quay, east of phase 1 (and adjacent to the Woolwich Ferry carpark), was completed in late 2022 and comprised towers of 23, 11, nine and six storeys, but differed markedly from what had originally been proposed. The developer, Comer Homes Group, proposed revisions to the design in December 2022 when construction was nearly finished. However, the build-to-rent development had "26 main deviations to the original planning permission" granted in 2012, and in September 2023, Greenwich Council ordered Comer Homes to demolish the blocks. Comer appealed against the enforcement notice. A planning inquiry was opened in July 2024. In January 2025, the Planning Inspectorate upheld 11 out of the council's 26 objections. The demolition order was conditionally revoked, with Comer Homes given three years to fix issues at the development and ordered to pay £4.4m towards affordable housing, and £2.3m in community infrastructure levy payments. The firm was ordered to replace "visually intrusive" orange cladding, provide promised accessibility features, undertake fire safety work and make public realm improvements at the base of the buildings. Comer Homes accepted the original scheme had not been lawfully implemented and that the existing buildings did not have planning permission; revised planning permission was issued. The demolition order was upheld as an 'ultimate sanction' if the conditions are not met.

== Heritage ==
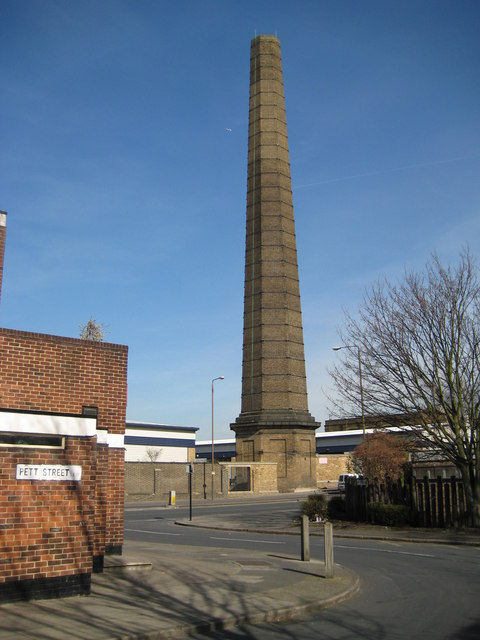
Steam Factory chimney

On Woolwich Church Street, a late 18th-century guard house and police office with neoclassical features stand alongside the former dockyard gates. Nearby, the former dockyard administration building now serves as the Clockhouse Community Centre; it dates from 1778 to 1784. Closer to the river, a couple of closed off docks have been preserved (and partly rebuilt) as a reminder of the area's marine significance. Two shipbuilding slips have also survived, either side of the first Mast Quay apartment blocks, and a pair of antique guns have been mounted on the quayside where a Royal Marines gun battery formerly stood.

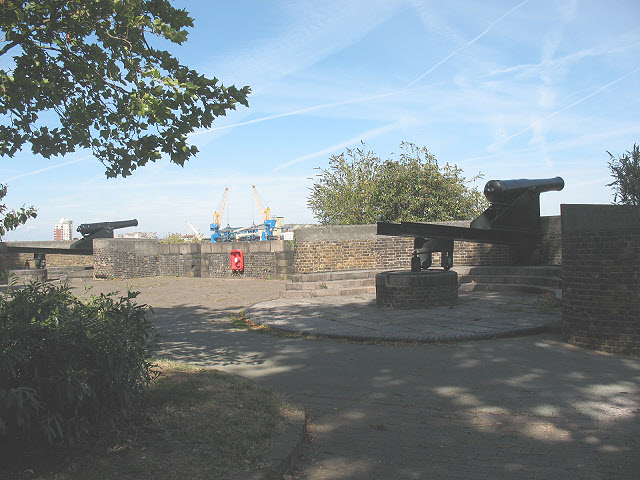
The gun battery, established to defend the dockyard in 1847, was rebuilt in 1976

Surviving industrial buildings include parts of the old factory wall along Woolwich Church Street and remnants of the Steam Factory with its prominent chimney nearby. The original factory building of 1838 still stands on the south side of Ruston Road, although only at around two-thirds of its original length of 444 feet (135 m). When built, it housed a complex of boiler shops, a foundry, fitting shops and erecting shops for the manufacture and assembly of marine steam engines. Additions were made over the next ten years, culminating in the smithery which stands parallel with the original block, to the south; dating from 1847, this originally contained 48 hearths and 5 Nasmyth steam hammers. Coppersmiths and brass founders were accommodated in a smaller block just to the west (which is still to be seen, immediately north of the old police house at the West Gate). The building which faces the police house across the gateway was built in 1848–1849 to serve as the Woolwich Dockyard School for Apprentices: one of a number of such schools set up at the Royal Dockyards under an Admiralty Scheme of 1843, Woolwich specialised in steam engineering, and for a time factory apprentices from all the royal dockyards were educated at the school.

Less than half a mile to the south of the site there is a railway station called Woolwich Dockyard.

=== Relocated buildings ===
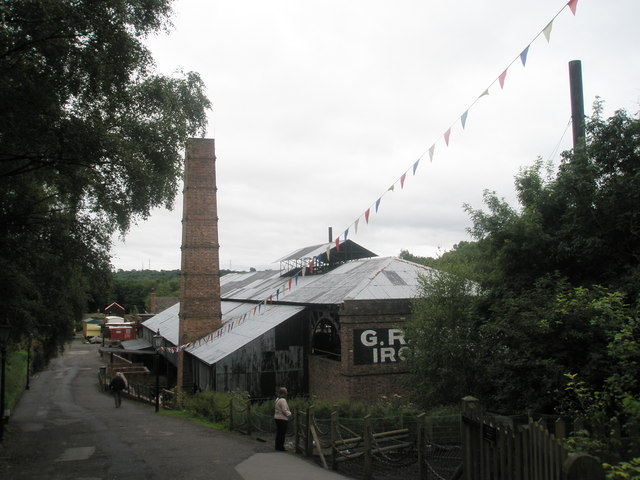
Rennie's 1814 Smithery building, which once stood at the head of No.3 Dock, rebuilt in Shropshire as part of the Blist Hill Open Air Museum.

An iron-framed building of 1814 by John Rennie the Elder, removed from Woolwich in the 1970s, was re-erected at Ironbridge where it houses the Blists Hill foundry exhibit; in the dockyard it had housed Rennie's anchor forge, which was notable as the first industrial use of steam power in any naval establishment (other than for pumping water).

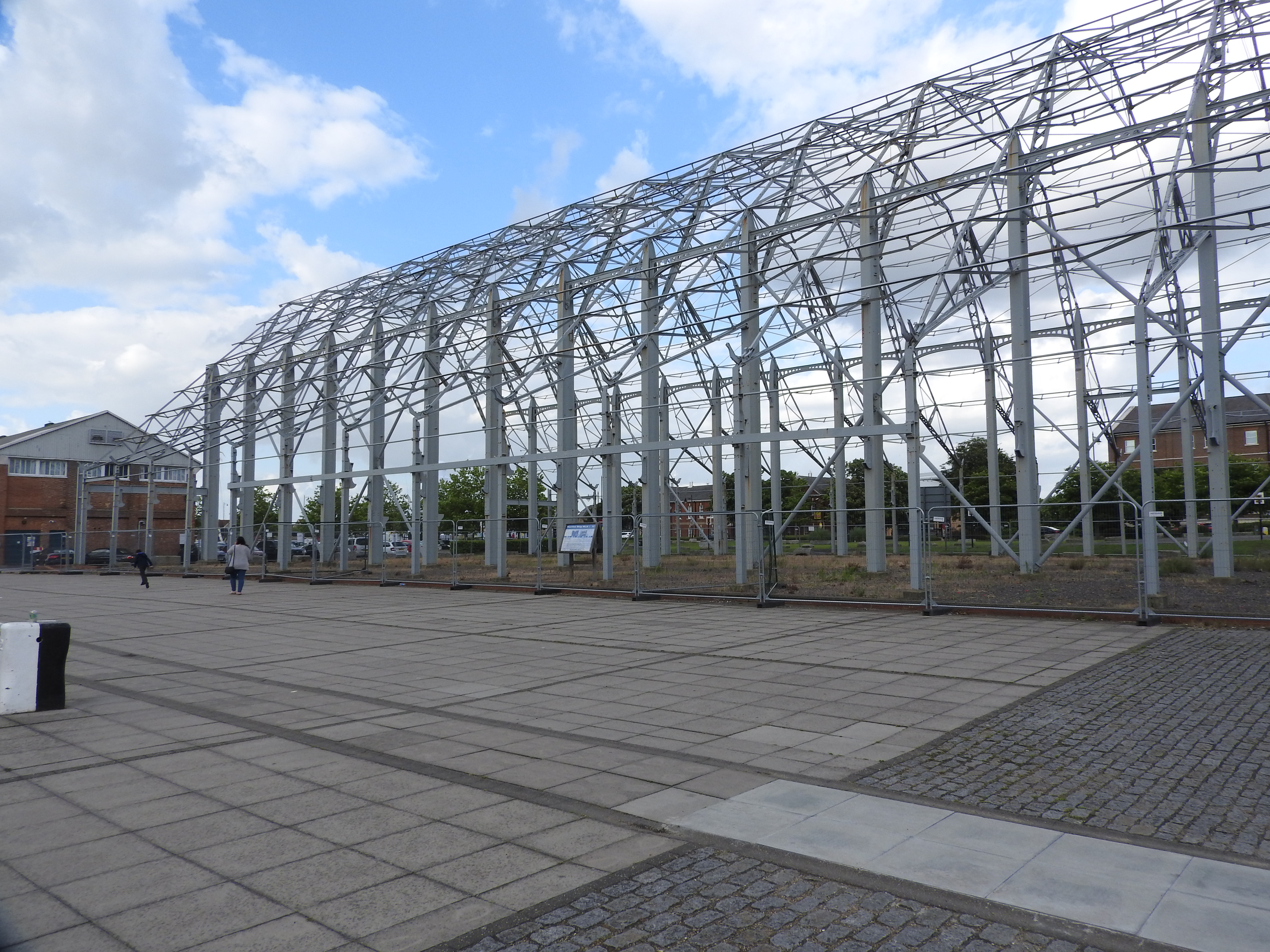
Iron framework of a former slip cover from Woolwich, built over No. 6 Slip in 1844–1845, then relocated to Chatham Dockyard (where it still stands) in 1880.

A number of metal roofs, built over shipbuilding slips at Woolwich in the 1840s and 1850s, were dismantled after the Yard closed and rebuilt at Chatham to house various manufacturing processes:

- The earliest, constructed by Fox, Henderson & Co in 1844–1845, remains one of the oldest surviving examples of a wide-span metal frame structure (of a form later destined to become familiar in the construction of train sheds and similar buildings). Originally built over No. 7 Slip (renumbered as No. 6 in the 1850s), the structure was dismantled after the closure of the dockyard and rebuilt at Chatham to serve as a machine shop.
- Another, built over No. 4 Slip in 1846–1847, was also by Fox and Henderson but of a much more sophisticated design (as well as being larger and more robust). Moved to Chatham in 1876, it served to house the main boiler shop for the steam factory there. After standing empty for many years it was restored in 2002–2003 to serve as the main mall of Chatham's Dockside Outlet shopping centre.
- A third slip cover, manufactured by Henry and Martin Grissell and erected over the new No. 5 Slip in 1856–58, was also moved to Chatham in the 1870s, where it went on to serve as the main Engineering Factory of the expanded dockyard. Unlike the earlier two examples it was subsequently demolished (in around about 1990).

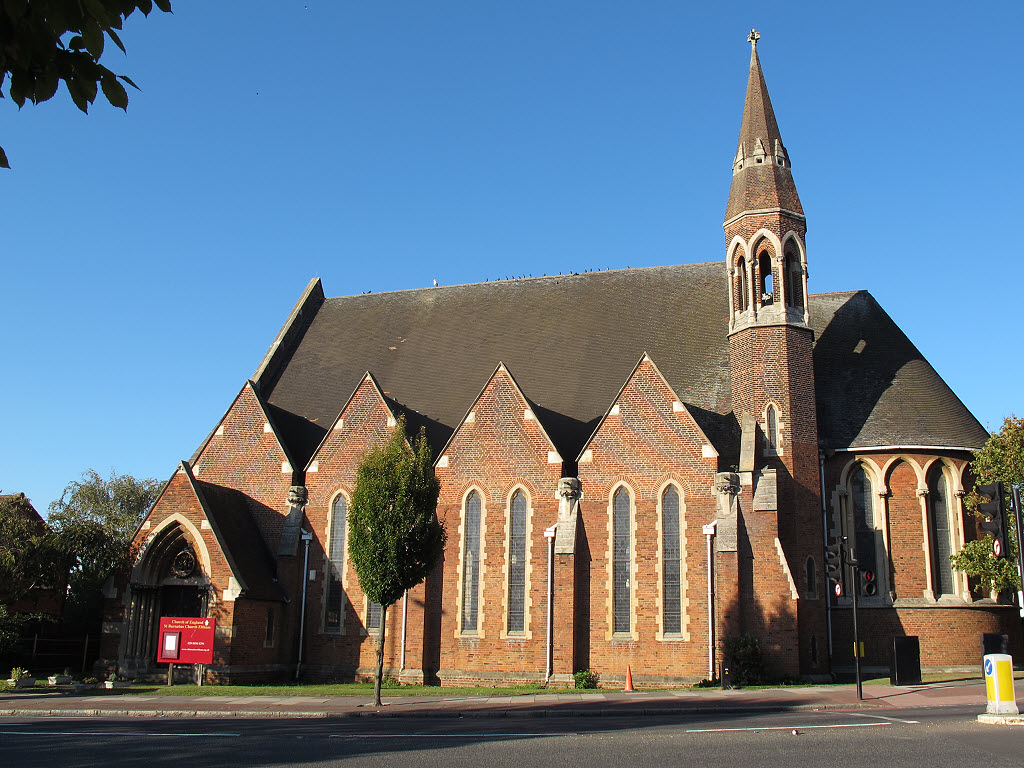
The former Dockyard Church, rebuilt in Eltham in 1932.

The Dockyard Church, designed by George Gilbert Scott and dating from 1856 to 1858, had formerly stood just inside the main gate to the Dockyard. It had seating for 1,200 worshippers and was designed to accommodate not only the resident officers and workers of the yard but also the Woolwich Division of the Royal Marines. After a period of disuse it was dismantled and rebuilt in 1932 in Eltham (where it remains in use as St Barnabas's Church).

=== Gallery ===
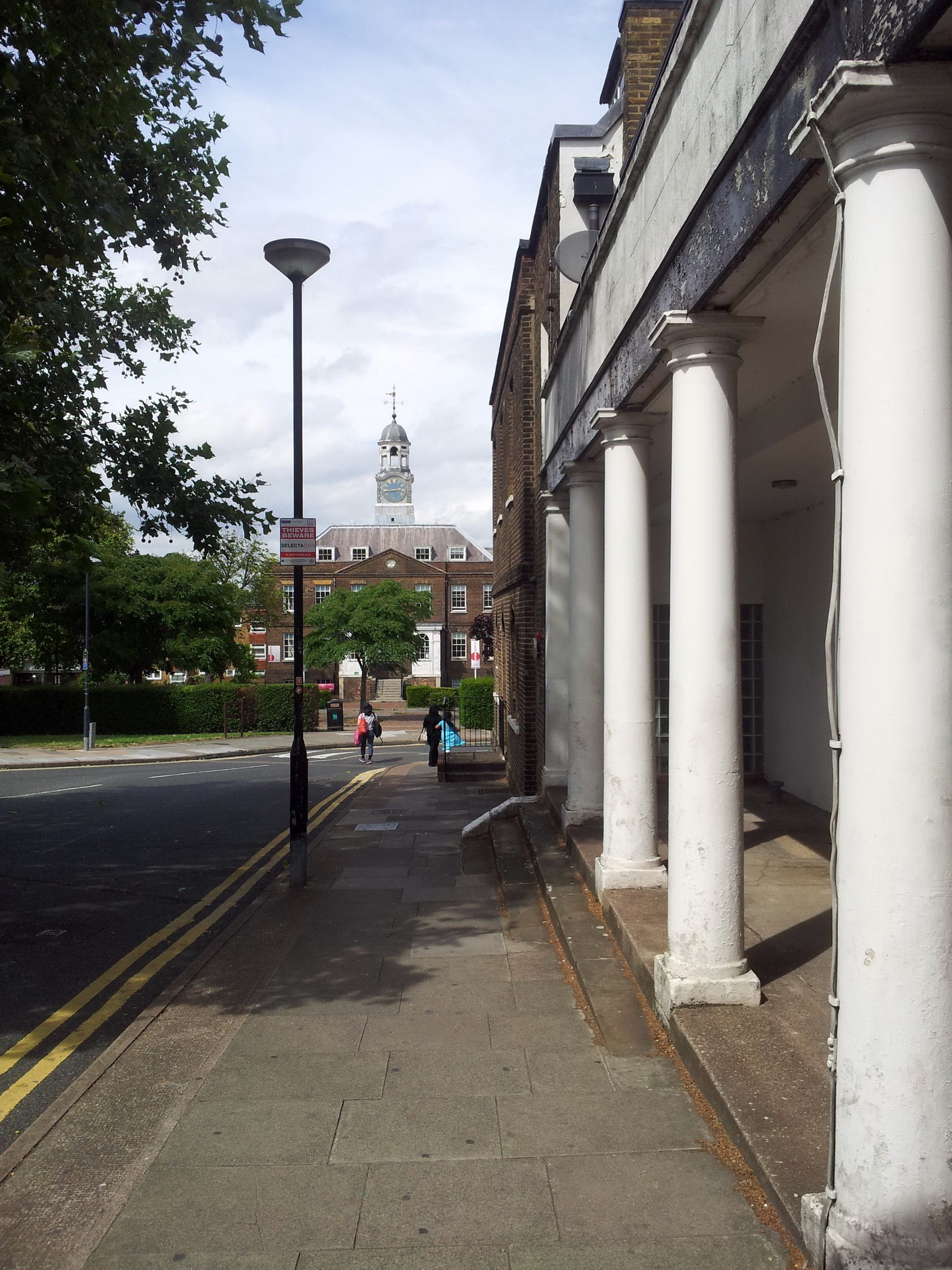
Clock house (1783) as seen from the main gate

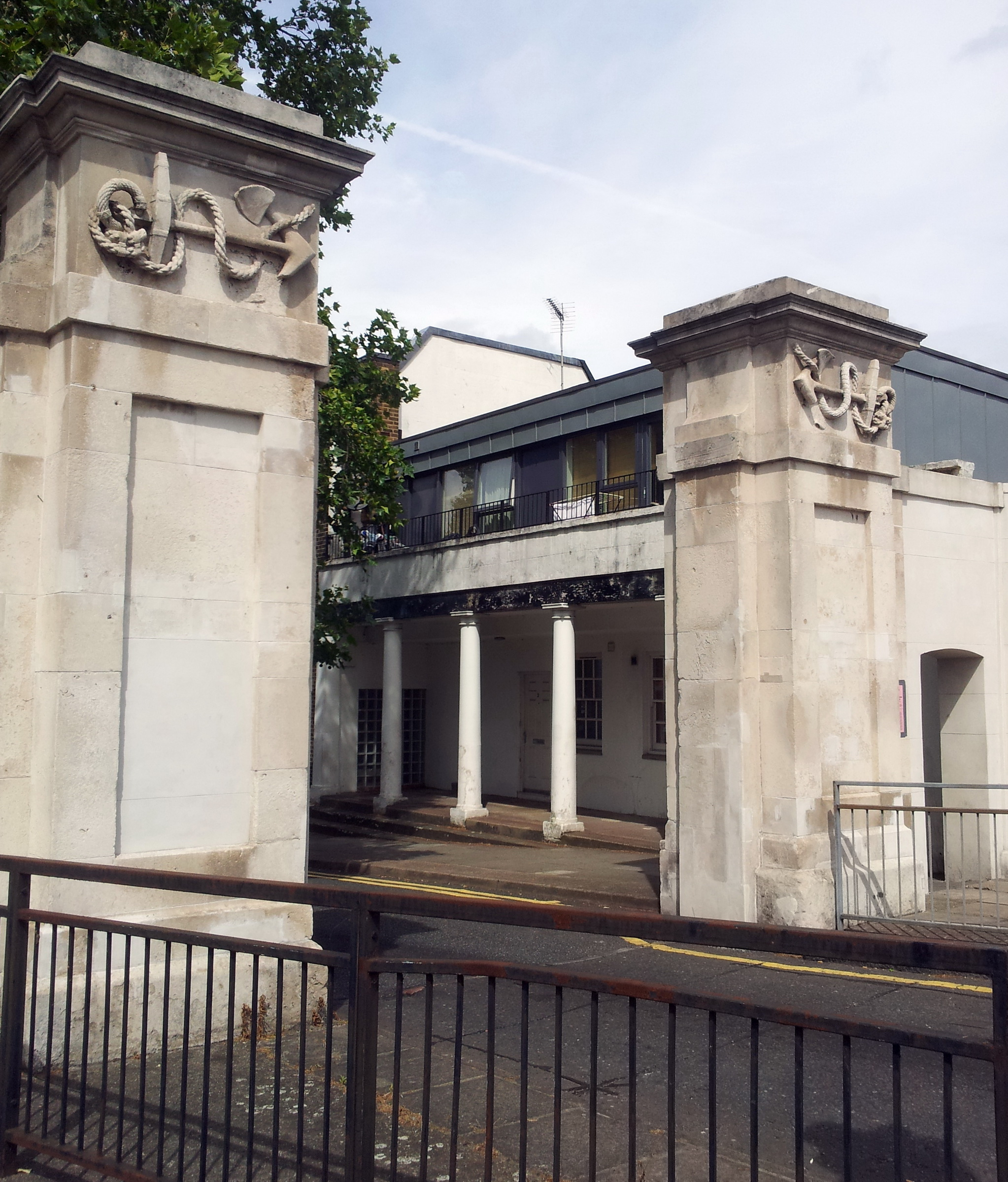
Main Gate (1784)

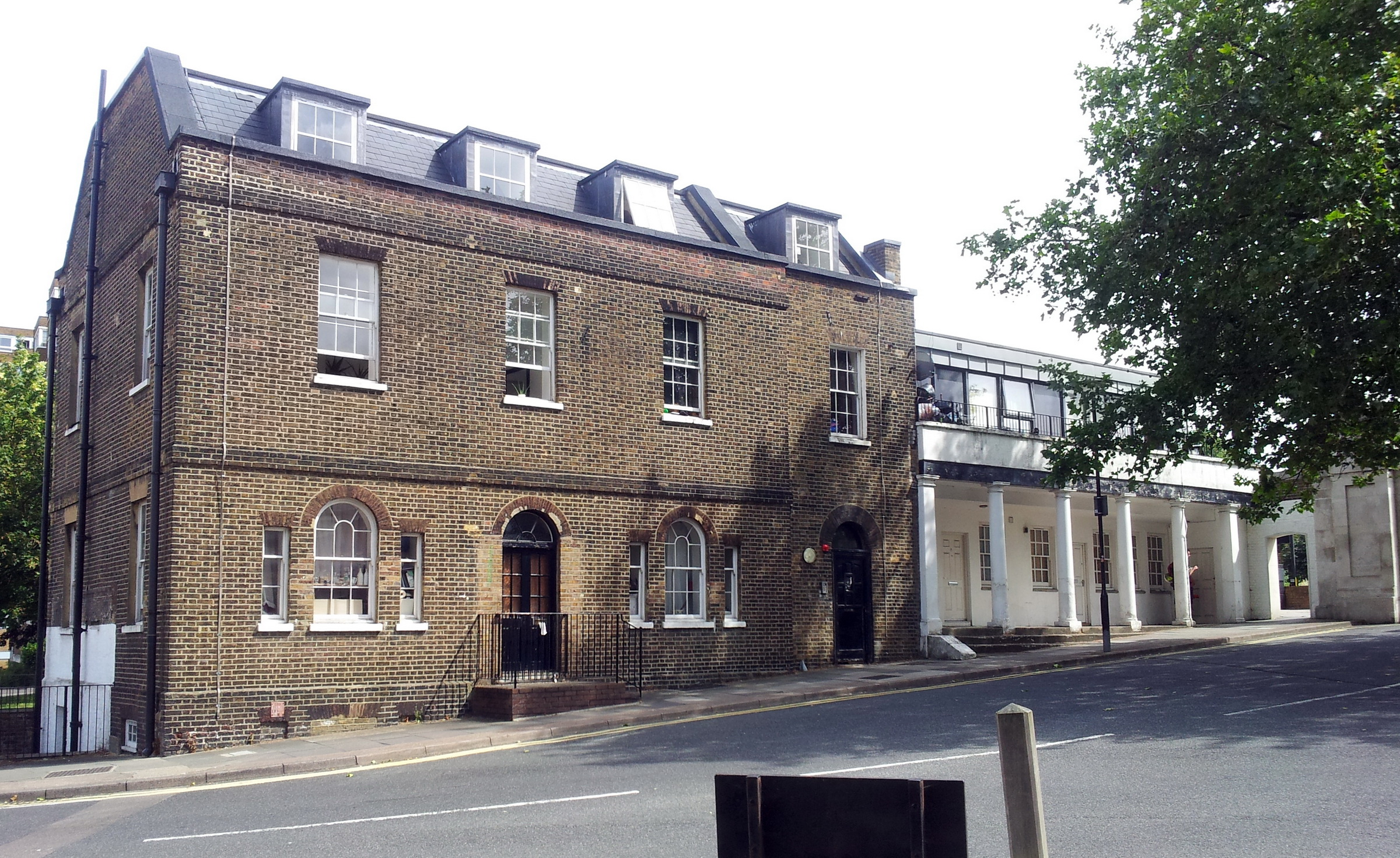
Guard house and Master Warders's lodgings (1788–1789)

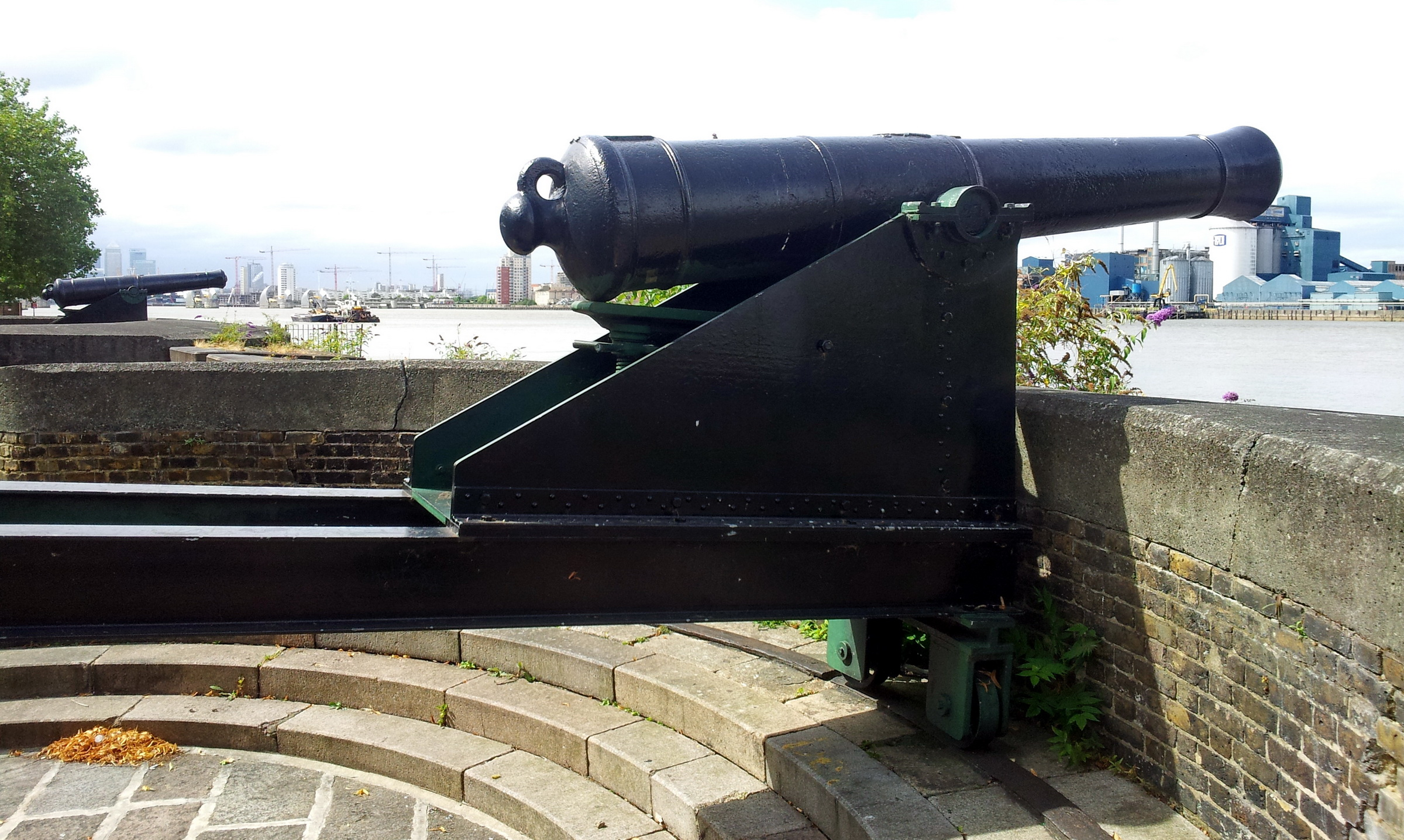
Gun battery (1847, rebuilt 1976)

==== Docks and slips ====
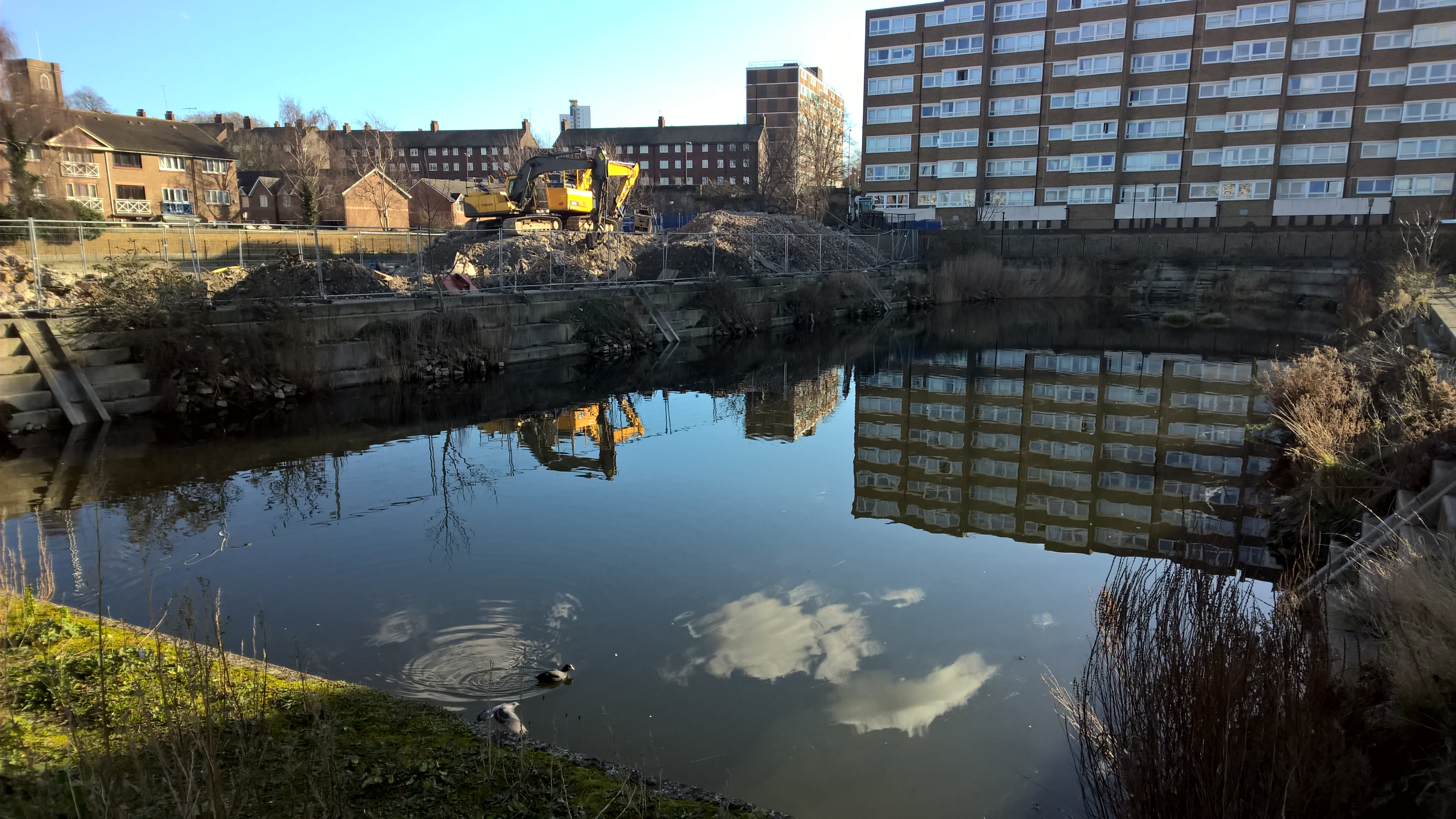
No. 2 Dock (rebuilt 1838–1841)

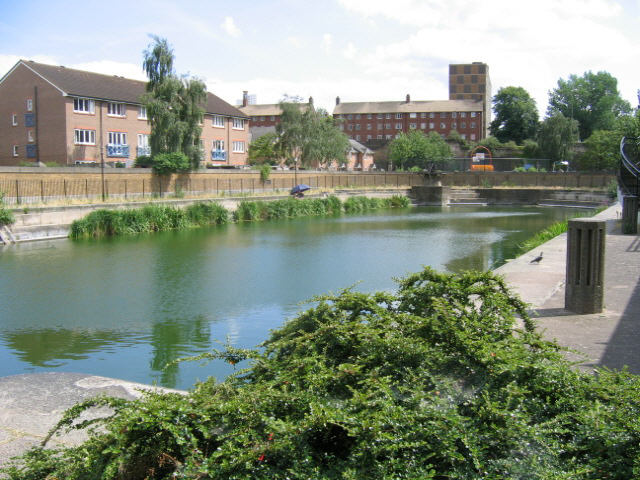
No. 3 Dock (rebuilt 1844–1846)

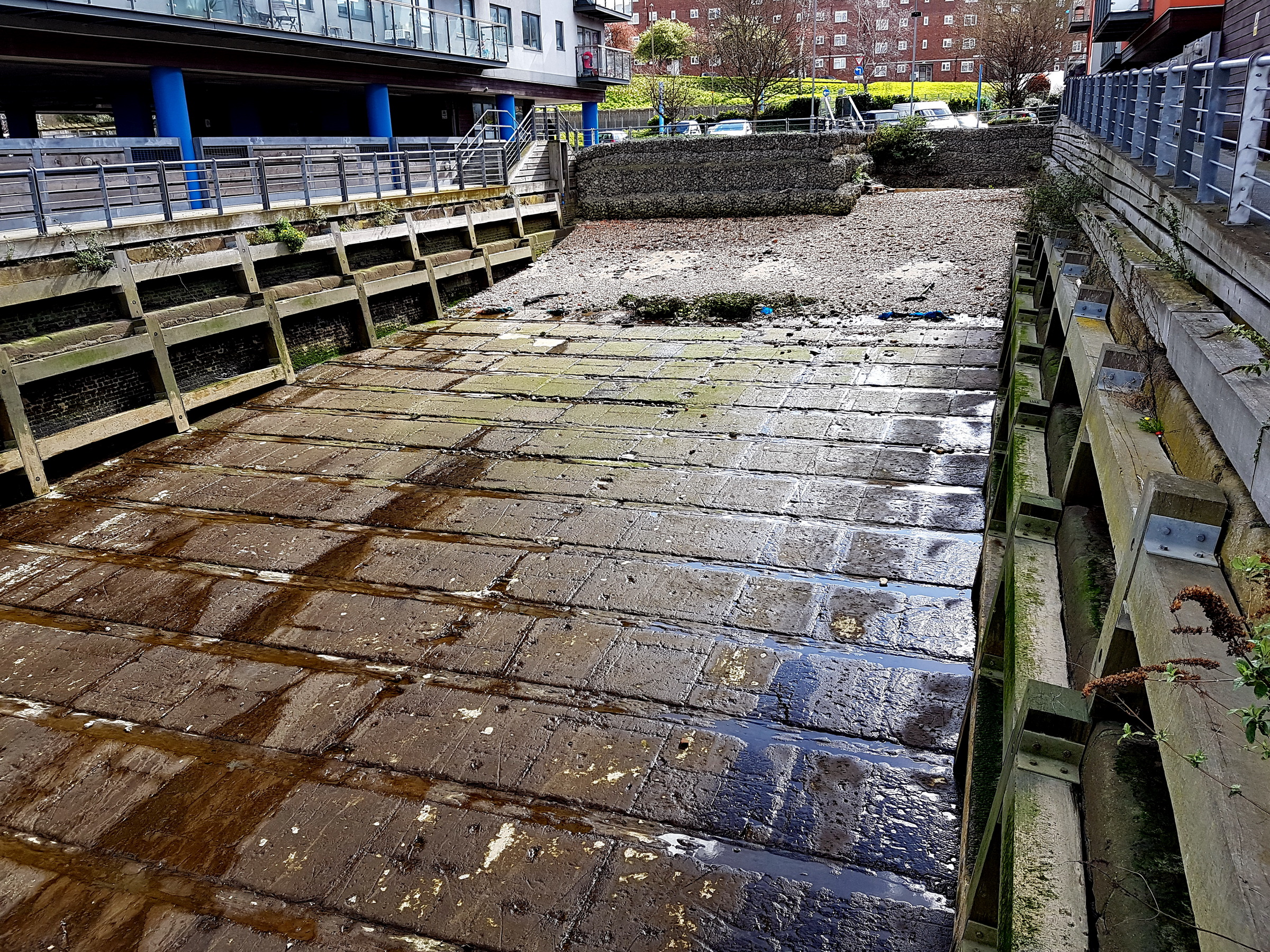
No. 5 Slip (rebuilt 1855–1856)

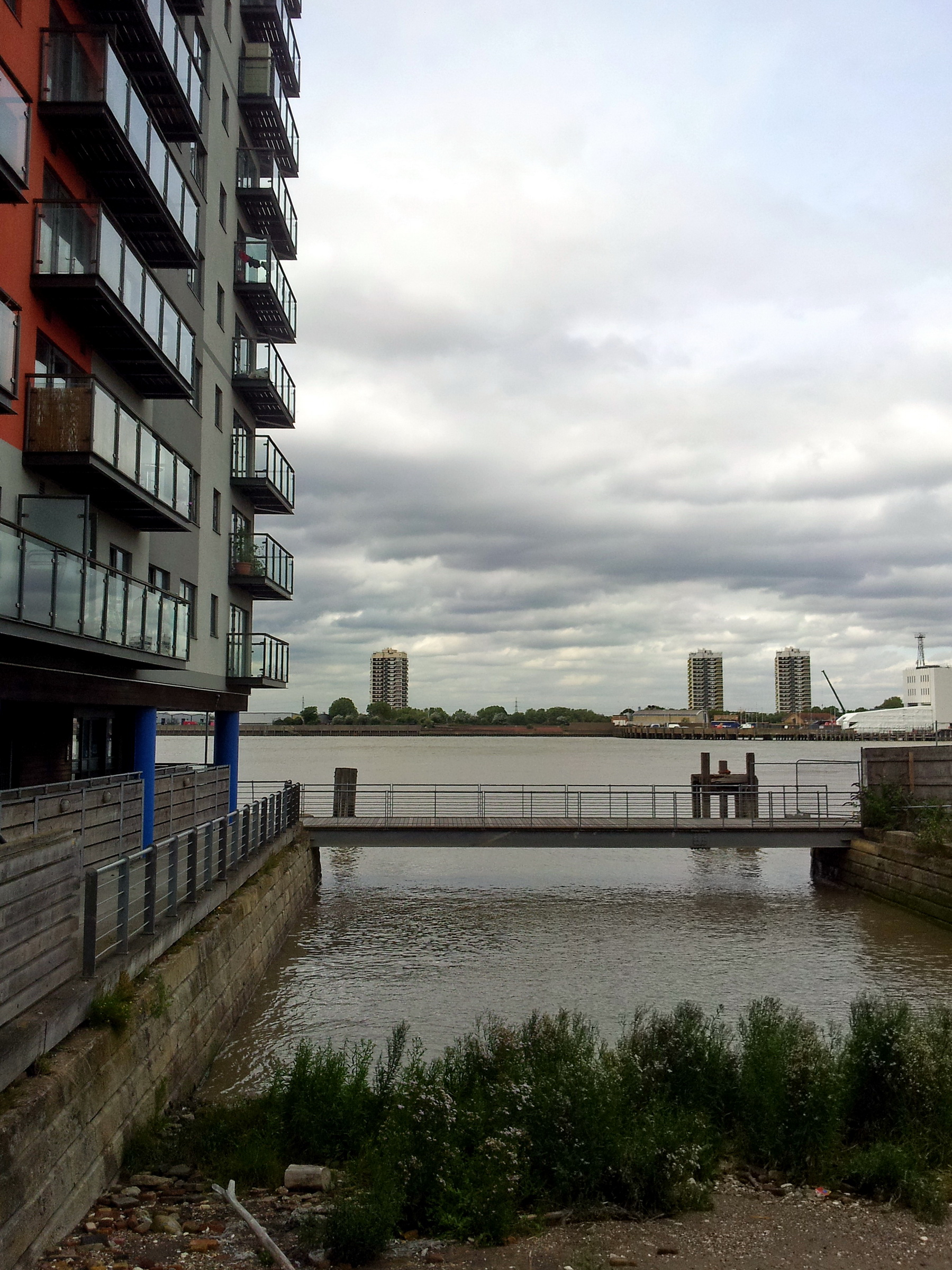
No. 6 Slip (1728, later rebuilt and extended)

==== Steam factory site ====
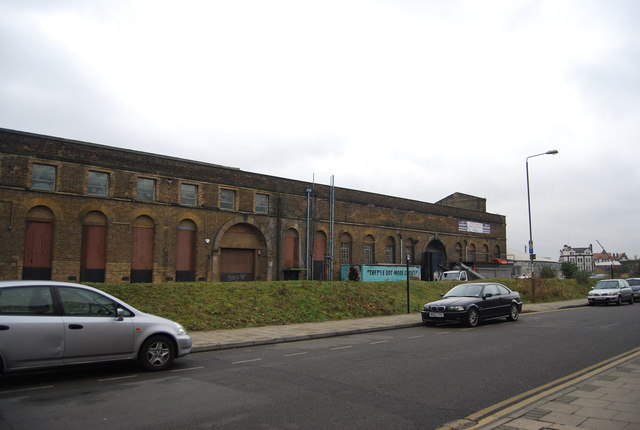
Steam Factory: the former erecting shop (1838)

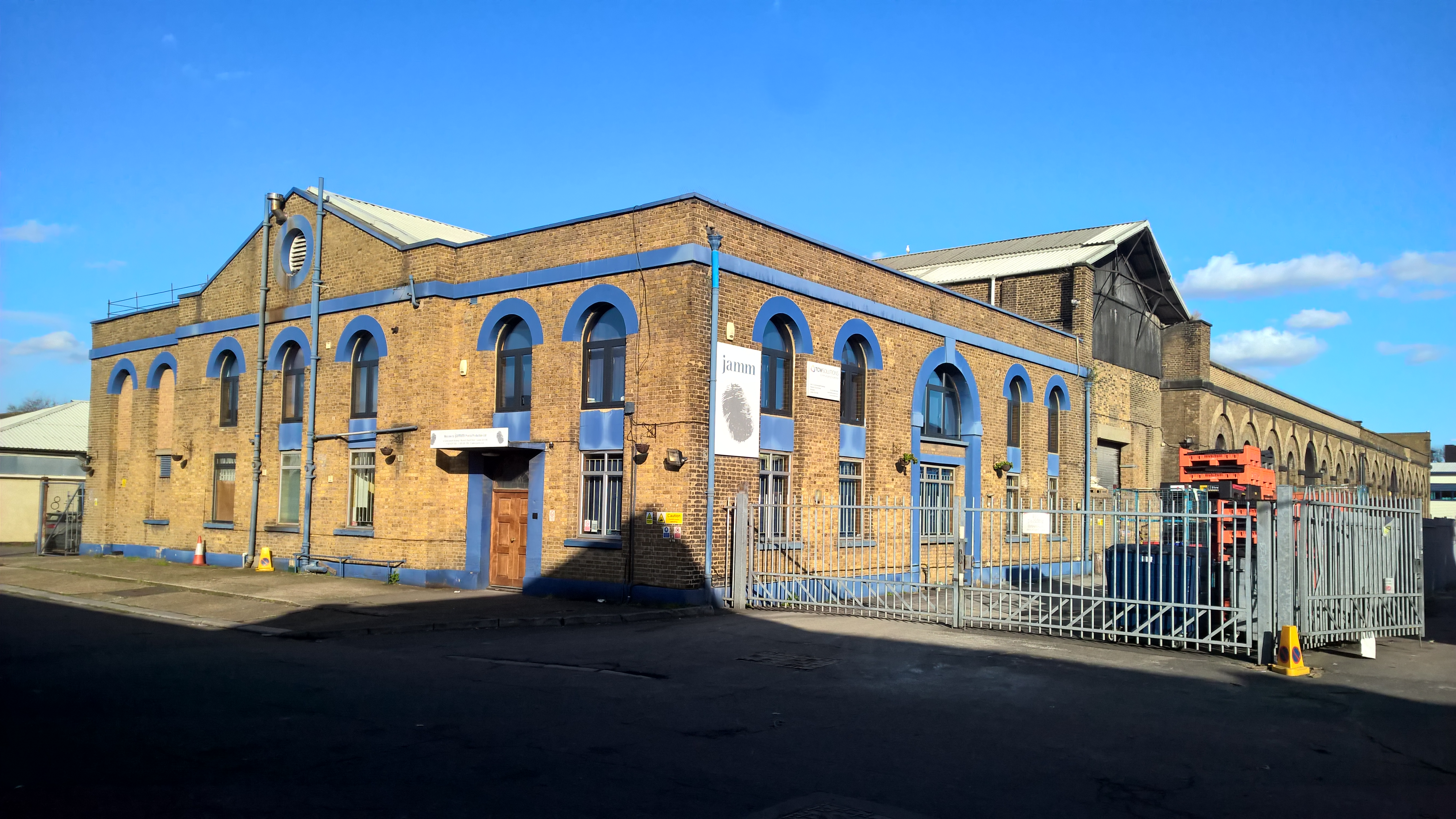
Steam Factory: the former brass foundry (1846) with the smithery beyond

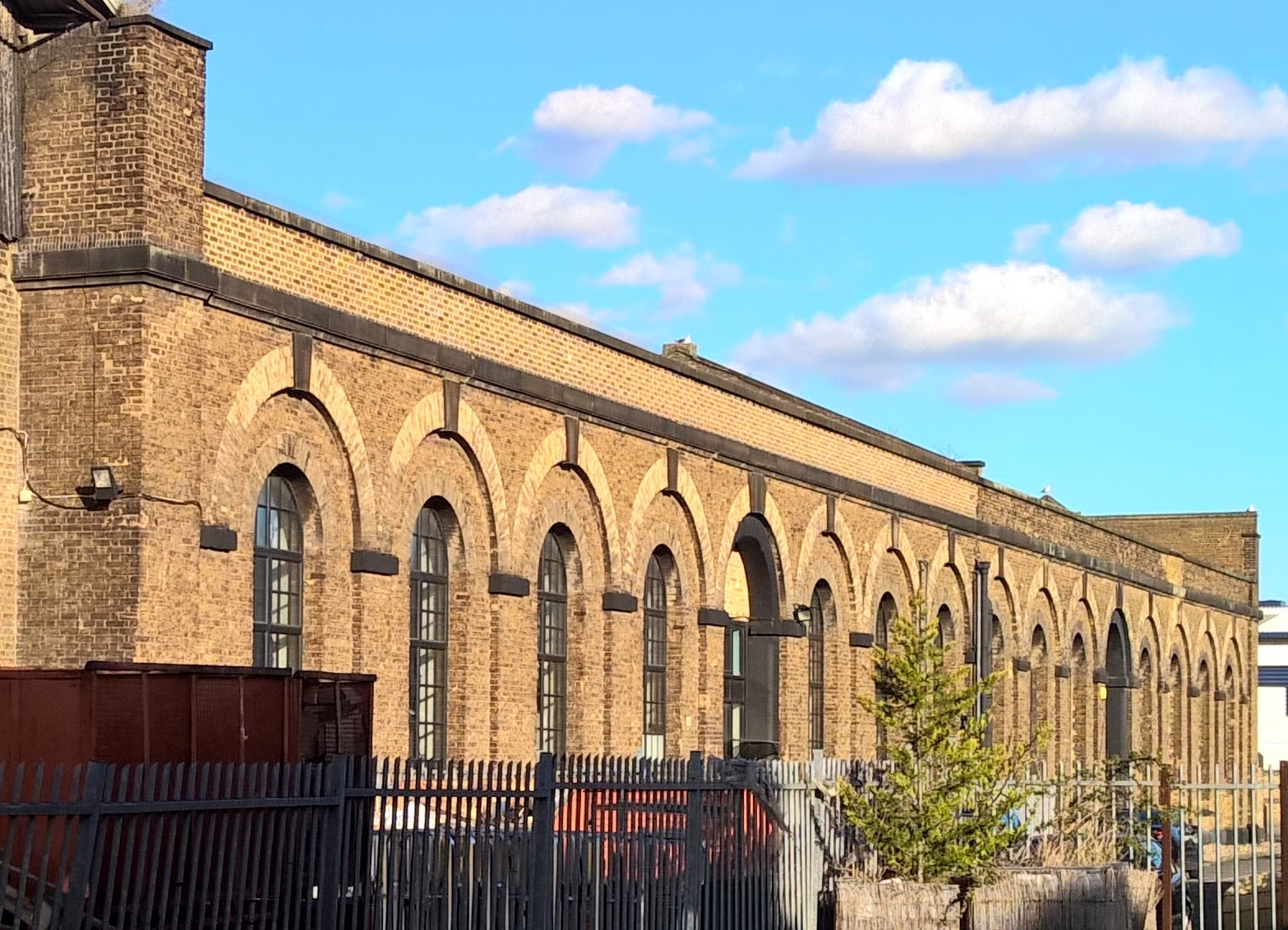
Steam Factory: the former smithery (1846)

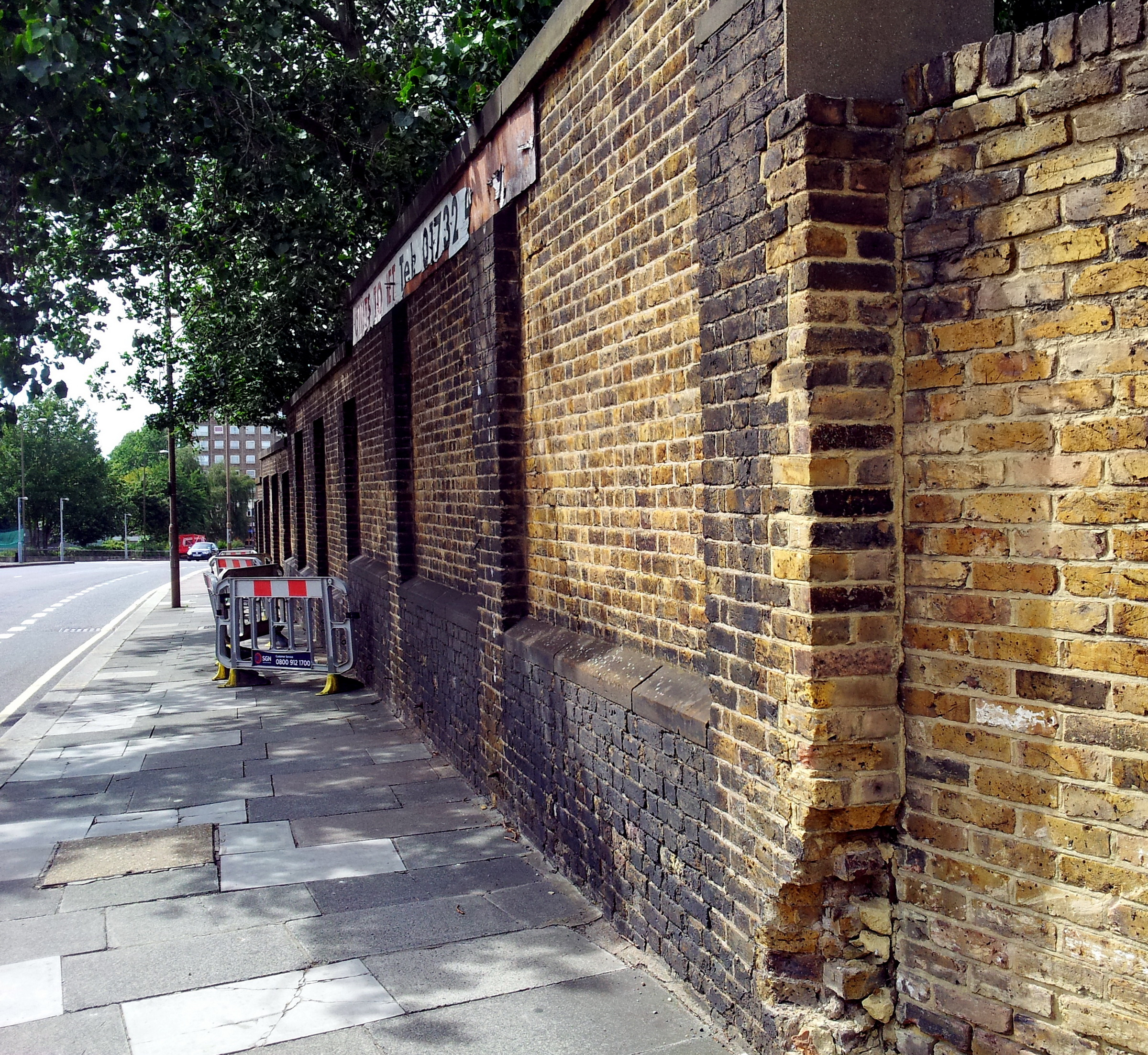
Factory wall (rebuilt c. 1840)

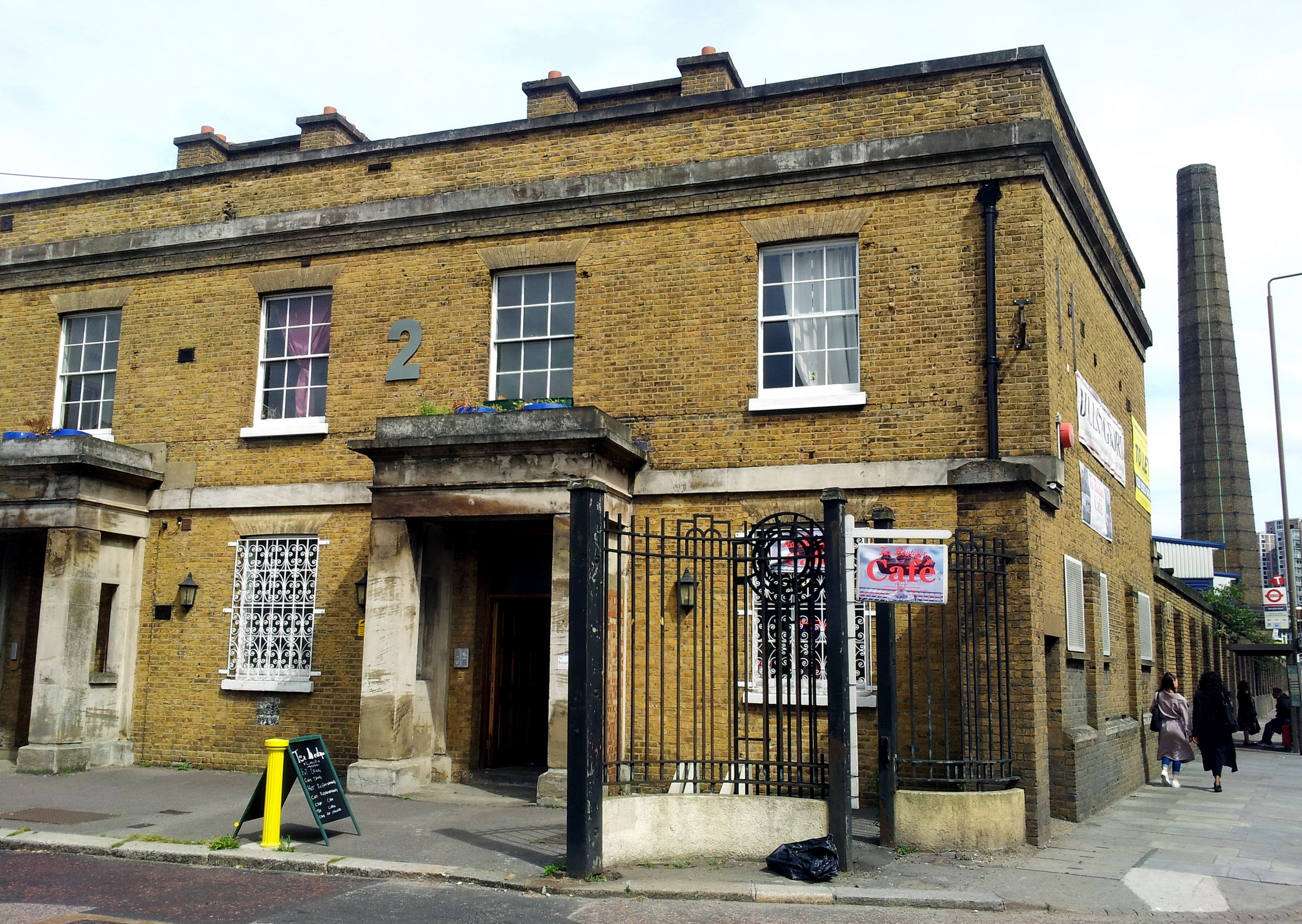
Police Station alongside the West Gate (1846)

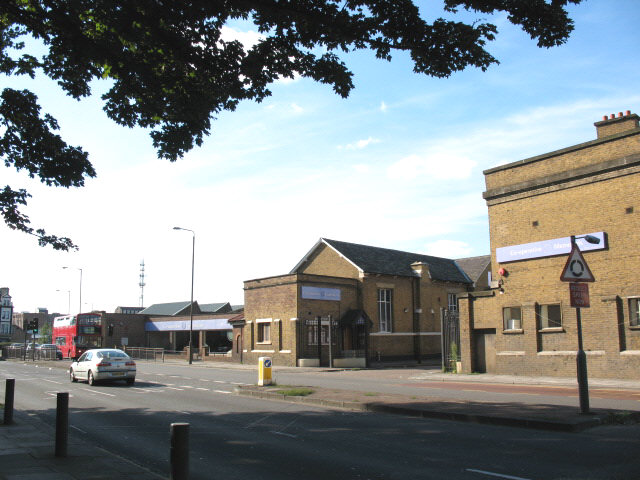
Woolwich Dockyard School for Apprentices (1848–1849)

==== Later development ====
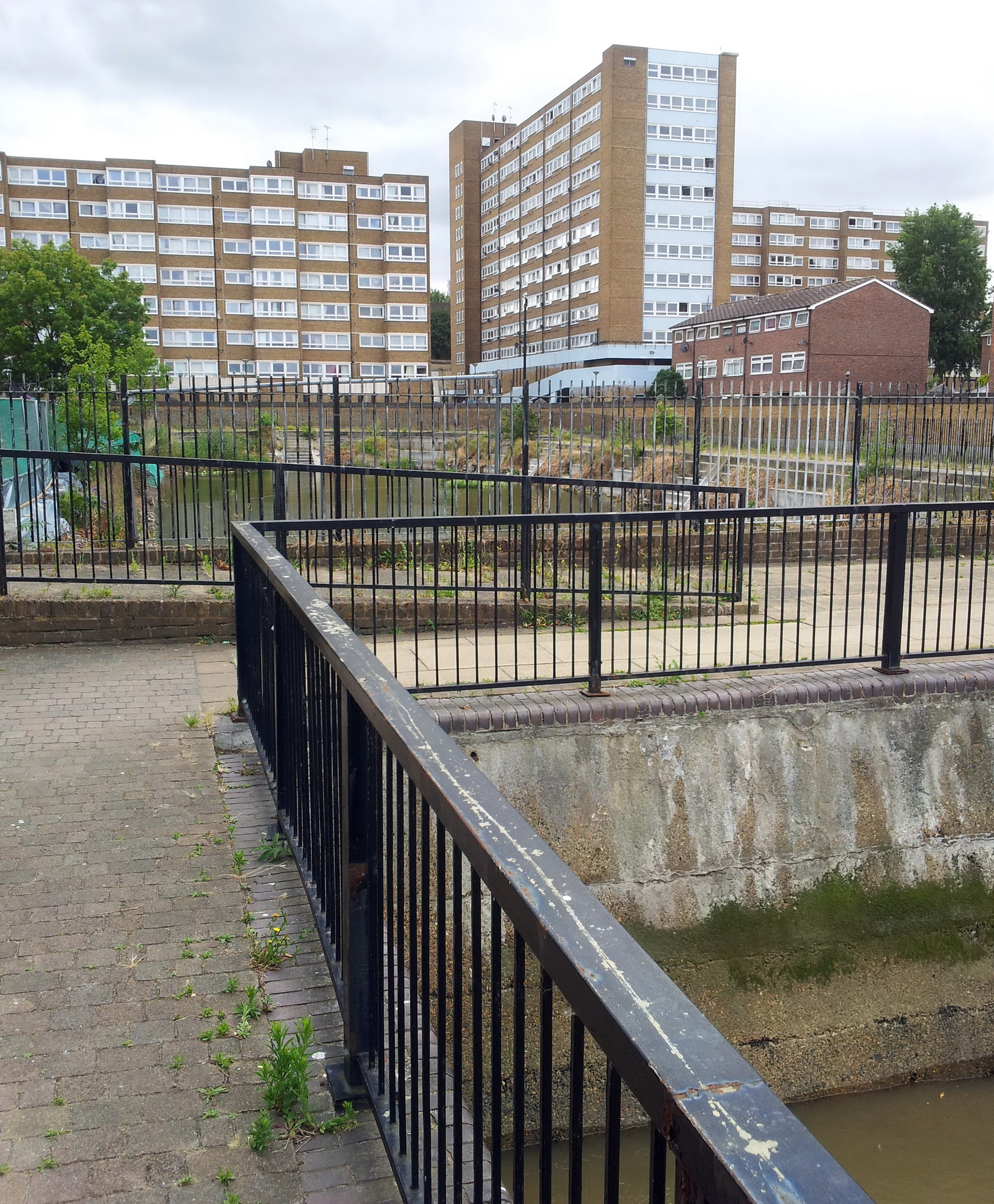
1970s housing estate

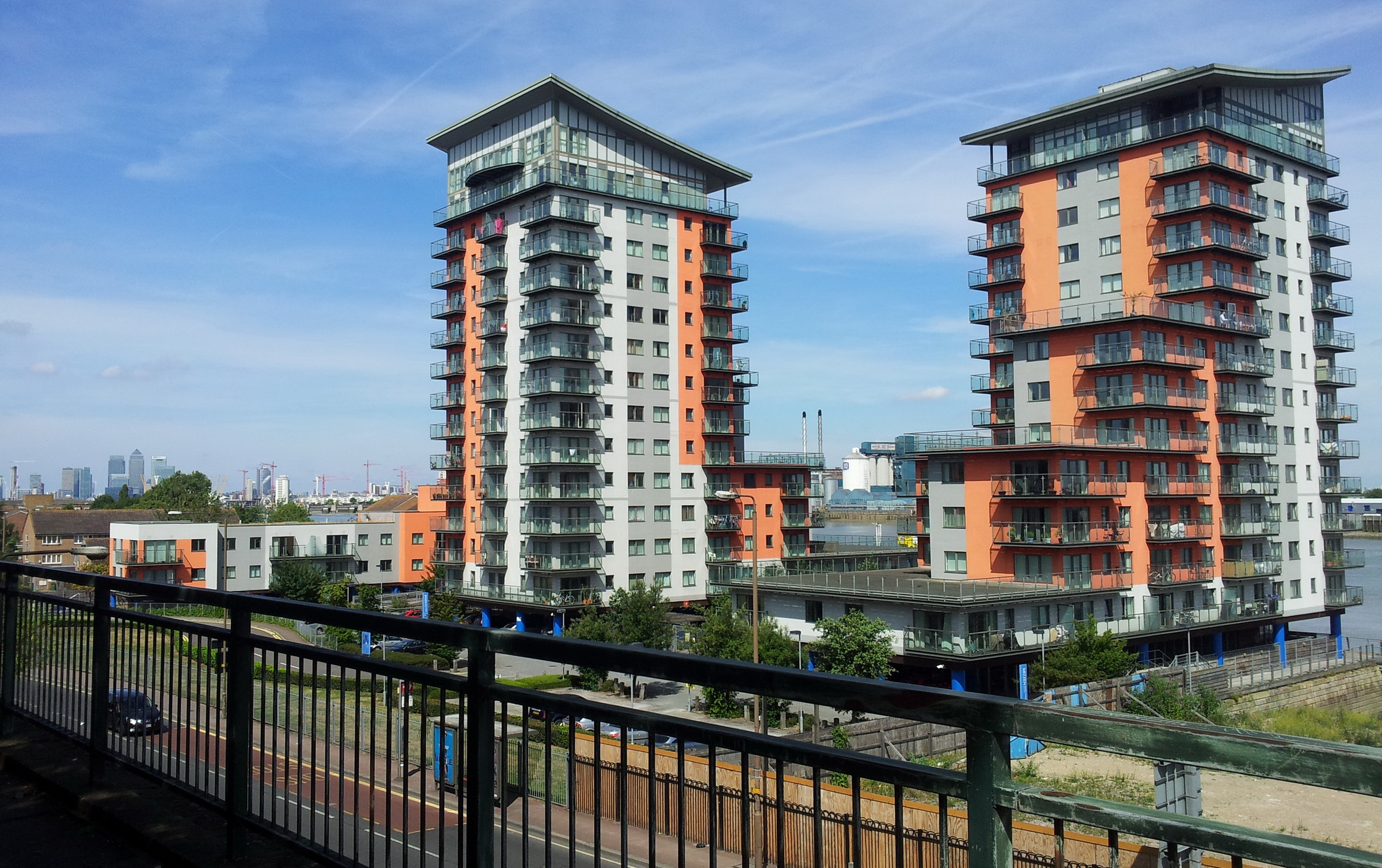
Mast Quay development (first phase, 2004–2006), from SE

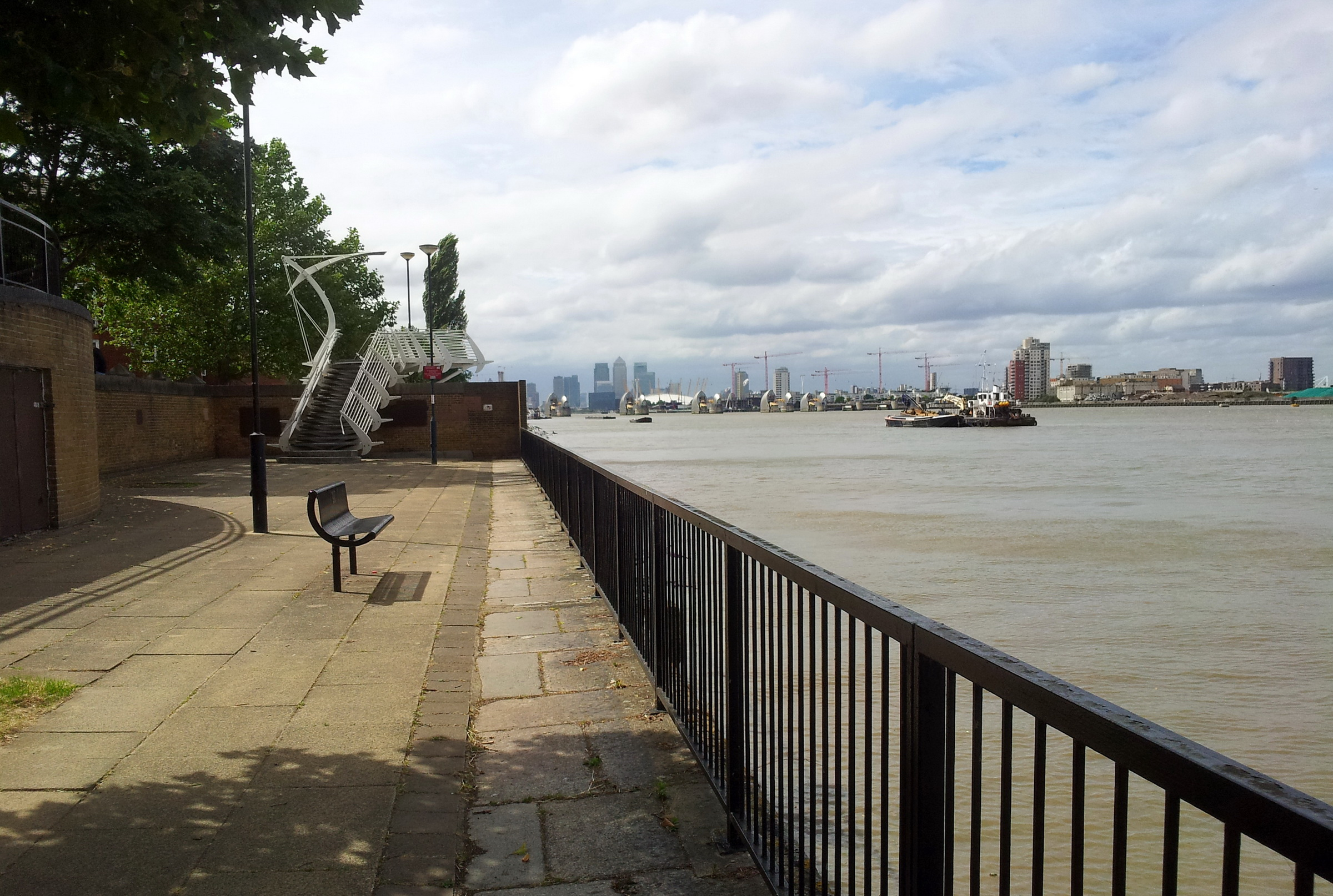
The Thames Path in Woolwich Dockyard

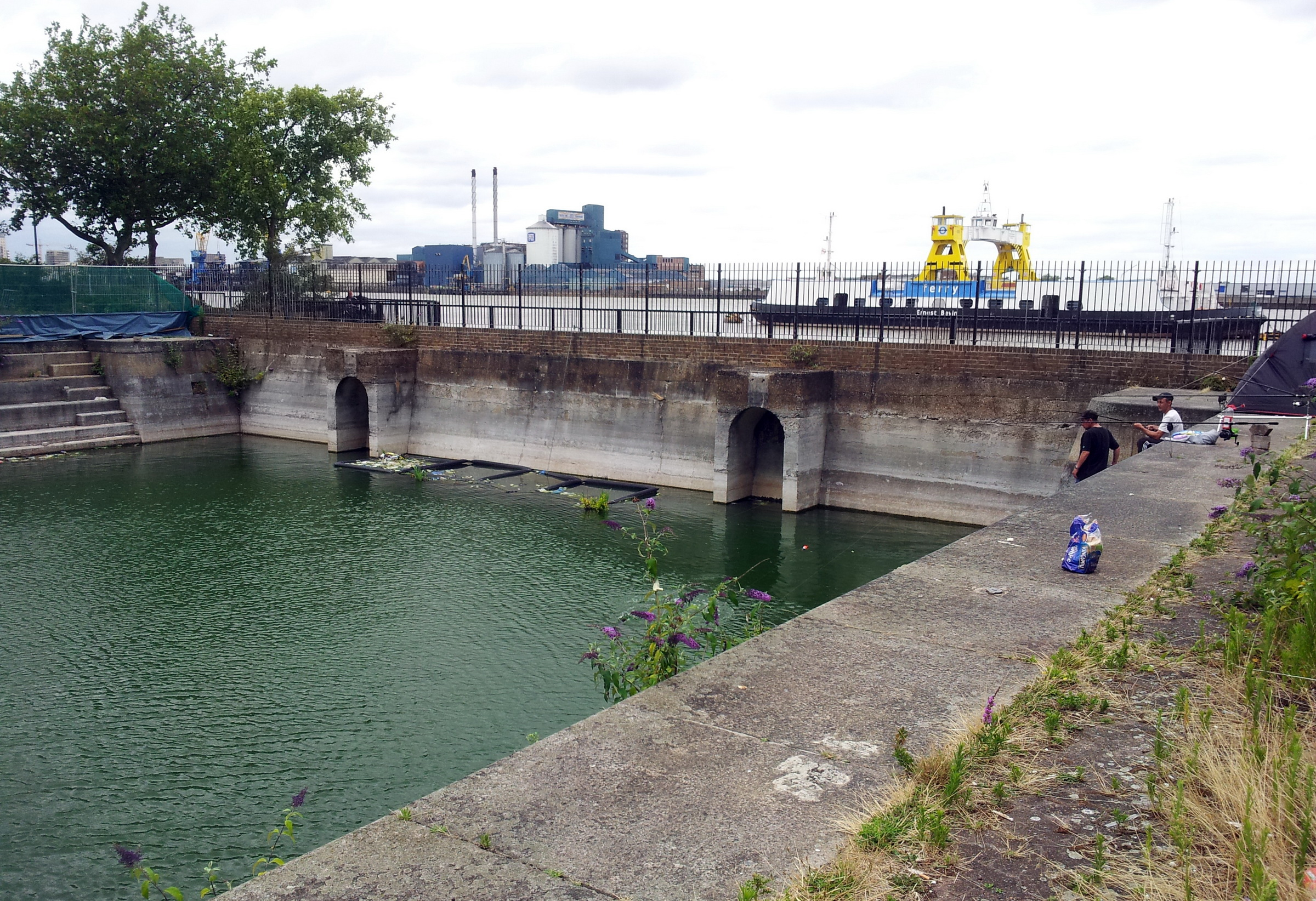
Fishing in a former dry dock
