= List of early warships of the English navy =

This is a list of early warships belonging to the English sovereign or the English Government, the precursor to the Royal Navy of England (from 1707 of Great Britain, and subsequently of the United Kingdom). These include major and minor warships from 1485 until 1660, the latter being the year in which the Royal Navy came formally into existence with the Restoration of Charles II (before the Interregnum, English warships had been the personal property of the monarch and were collectively termed "the king's ships"). Between Charles I's execution in 1649 and the Restoration eleven years later, the Navy became the property of the state (Commonwealth and Protectorate), under which it expanded dramatically in size.

== Prefix ==
While the prefix "HMS" (for His or Her Majesty's Ship) is often applied in connection with these ships, the term was not technically applicable, as it was only instituted with the establishment of the Royal Navy in 1660, following the Restoration of King Charles II of England.

== Glossary ==
- BU = broken up

The dates for ships before 1485 are probably listed using the contemporary English convention of the first day of the year being 25 March (Lady Day).

In the sections listing warships in the English/Royal Navy from 1485 onwards, the dates have been quoted using the modern convention of the year starting on 1 January, where this information is available. All dates are given in the Julian Calendar ("Old Style").

== List of English warships before 1485 ==
The following list is based extensively upon that provided in Michael Oppenheim's History of the Administration of the Royal Navy and in Volume 1 of William Laird Clowes's The Royal Navy: A History from the Earliest Times to 1900.

Note that almost every vessel listed had the words "of the Tower" (or "de la Tour" when inscribed in French, still an official language at the time) affixed to its name. This affix was simply the equivalent of the modern prefix "HMS" and is omitted below.
The number of guns quoted in most sources comprised almost entirely small(ish) iron weapons created from wrought material bound into barrels by iron hoops. These were exclusively anti-personnel weaponry; very few heavy weapons were carried, and even these were rarely used for ship-to-ship fire.

- Trinity – Dismantled c. 1409, materials used for Trinity Royal
- Goodgrace (c. 1400)
- Le Carake (ex-Genoese Sancta Maria & Sancta Brigida, captured 1409)
- Christopher 5 (1410/12) – Holk (similar to a cog)
- Trinity Royal (1416)
- Jesus (c. 1416)
- George (ex-Genoese carrack ?, captured 1416) – To Venice 1424
- Marie Hampton (ex-Genoese carrack ?, captured 1416)
- Marie Sandwich (ex-Genoese carrack ?, captured 1416)
- Agase (ex-Genoese carrack ?, captured 1416) – Wrecked on mudflats c. 1418
- Andrew (ex-Genoese carrack Galeas Negre, captured 1417)
- Peter (ex-Genoese carrack ?, captured 1417)
- Paul (ex-Genoese carrack Vivande, captured 1417)
- Christopher Spayne (ex-Genoese Pynele ??, captured 1417) – Sold 1423
- Marie Spayne (ex-Spanish ?, captured 1417)
- Holigost Spayne [Holy Ghost of Spain] (ex-Spanish Santa Clara, captured 1417)
- Grace Dieu (1418) – Lightning and fire, 1439
- Grace Dieu (1449) – rebuilt 1473, BU c. 1487
- Peter – Abandoned 1462
- Mary 48
- George
- Edward Howard (c. 1466, ex-Portuguese ?, captured 1479)
- Governor (1485)

== List of English warships 1485–1603 ==
The lists for the Tudor period are taken primarily from Arthur Nelson's The Tudor Navy and David Childs's Tudor Sea Power (cited in references at the end of this article).

Where applicable, number of main guns follows name (see Rating system of the Royal Navy). Note that long-lived ships could be rearmed several times. Many earlier ships went through periodic repairs and rebuildings (many now unrecorded) during which their dimensions and their armament changed considerably.

=== Henry VII (additions 1485–1509) ===
The number of guns listed in various sources is not really relevant; most of the large number quoted in contemporary records were small anti-personnel weapons, and the number of these would vary from time to time (changes usually unrecorded). Accordingly, the figures have been omitted.

- Carvel of Ewe (purchased 1487) – last mentioned 1518
- Regent (ex-Grace Dieu) (built 1488) – burnt at the Battle of St Matthieu, 1512
- Sovereign (ex-Trinity Sovereign) (built 1488) – rebuilt 1509, last mentioned 1525
- Michael (1488, a prize taken from the Scots; not to be confused with the much larger Scottish carrack Michael) – last mentioned 1513
- Margaret (1490, a prize taken from the Scots) – deleted before 1509
- Mary Fortune (prototype galleass built 1497) – renamed Swallow when rebuilt 1512, deleted 1527
- Sweepstake (prototype galleass built 1497 in Portsmouth what is thought by some to be the UK's first dry dock) – deleted 1527

=== Henry VIII (additions 1509–1547) ===
Heavy (bronze) guns mounted on carriages only appeared during this reign. The concept of cutting gunports into the lower deck emerged early in the period, and relatively few heavy guns were carried. Even the largest would only have heavy guns numbering in single figures, the remainder being small anti-personnel weapons.

==== Ships ====
These were described simply as ships, most were probably carracks)

  - Mary Rose (1509) – rebuilt 1536, sank 1545, starboard-side remains recovered 1982 and preserved at Portsmouth
  - Peter Pomegranate (1510) – rebuilt 1536, deleted 1552
  - Jennet Prywin (ex-Scottish Andrew Barton, captured 1511, originally Danish) – deleted 1514
  - Lion (ex-Scottish privateer prize, captured 1511) – sold 1513
  - Anne Gallant (built 1512) – wrecked 1518
  - Christ (ex Christ of Lynn, purchased 1512) – captured by Barbary pirates 1515
  - Dragon (built 1512) – last recorded 1514
  - John Baptist (purchased 1512) – wrecked 1534
  - Mary George (ex Mary Howard, purchased 1512) – last recorded 1526
  - Mary James (ex James of Hull, purchased 1512) – last recorded 1529
  - Lizard (purchased 1512) – last recorded 1522
  - Great Nicholas (ex Nicholas Reede, purchased 1512) – deleted by 1522
  - Great Bark 63 (built 1512) – sold 1531
  - Little Barbara or Barbara of Greenwich (1512) – last recorded 1514
  - Black Bark or Christopher (1513) – last recorded 1514
  - Henry Hampton (purchased 1513) – hulked 1521 and not later recorded
  - Mary Imperial (1513) – last recorded 1525
  - Henri Grâce à Dieu ("Great Harry") 186 (1514) – rebuilt 1539, renamed Edward 1547, but accidentally burned 1553.
  - Great Elizabeth (ex Salvator von Lubeck, purchased 1514) – wrecked 1514.
  - Great Galley (built 1515) – rebuilt 1542 as a ship and renamed Great Bark
  - Less Bark (1517) – rebuilt 1536 and renamed Small Bark, last recorded 1552
  - Mary Gloria (purchased 1517) – last recorded 1522
  - Katherine Bark (built 1518) – last recorded 1525
  - Bark of Bullen (captured 1522 from the French) – last recorded 1525
  - Bark of Murless (ex Bark of Morlaix, captured 1522 from the French) – last recorded 1530
  - Magdeline (ex Mawdlyn of Deptford, 1522) – last recorded 1525
  - Mary and John (Spanish galleon) – last recorded 1528
  - John of Greenwich (captured 1523) – last recorded 1530
  - Primrose (built 1523) – rebuilt 1538, sold 1555
  - Minion (built 1523) – rebuilt 1536, given away 1549
  - Mary Guildford (built 1524) – last recorded 1539
  - Trinity Henry (1530) – sold 1558
  - Sweepstake (built 1535) – condemned 1559
  - Mary Willoughby (built 1535) – captured by the Scots 1536 but retaken 1547, rebuilt 1551, sold 1573
  - Matthew (ex Matthew Gonson, purchased 1539) – last recorded 1558
  - Pansy (built 1543) – condemned 1558
  - Artigo (ex Ferronière, captured 1543 from the French) – sold 1547
  - Jesus of Lübeck (ex-Hanseatic League carrack Jesus von Lübeck, purchased 1544) – sunk by Spanish 1568
  - Marryan (ex-Hanseatic League Morian Murryan, purchased 1544) – sold 1551
  - Struss (ex-Hanseatic League Struce of Dawsky, purchased 1544) – sold 1552
  - Mary Hambrough (ex-Hanseatic League, purchased 1544) – sold 1558
  - Christopher of Bream (purchased 1545) – sold 1556
  - Mary Thomas (captured 1545) – last recorded 1546
  - Mary James (captured 1545) – last recorded 1546
  - Mary Odierne (captured 1545) – last recorded 1546
  - Trinity (captured 1545) – last recorded 1546
  - Sacrett (captured 1545) – condemned 1559
  - Hope Bark (1546) – last recorded 1548

==== Carracks ====
These were specifically mentioned as such, although most of the "ships" above were probably carracks also.

  - Gabriel Royal (ex Genoese, purchased 1512)
  - Katherine Fortune (ex Genoese Katarina Fortileza, purchased 1512)
  - Mary Loret (ex Genoese Maria de Larreto, requisitioned 1514, but returned later in the same year)
  - Great Barbara (ex Mawdelyn, purchased 1513) – last recorded 1524

==== Galleys ====
  - Henry Galley (built 1512) – lost 1513
  - Rose Galley (1512) – last recorded 1521
  - Kateryn Galley (1512) – last recorded 1527
  - Galley Subtile (built 1543) – listed as a gallease 1546, condemned 1560
  - Mermaid (ex Galley Blanchard, captured 1545) – last recorded 1563

==== Galleasses ====
The galleass was a compromise between the sleek lines and underwater shape of the galley and the broadside guns of the carrack; in this sense it was the predecessor of the galleon. Primarily sailing warships, with oars as ancillary means of propulsion. Twelve were built for Henry VIII in three groups between 1536 and 1546, and two further vessels of the type were captured from the Scottish Navy and added to the English fleet, and another was purchased. As the oars were found to detract from their sailing performance, they were removed by the time of Henry's death and in 1549 all fifteen galleasses were re-classed as 'ships'. Those in good condition were rebuilt as small galleons in 1558 (six) or 1570 (two).

First group These four vessels were three-masted galleasses, each with a low forecastle and three pairs of gunports set along the rowing deck. A fifth galleasse - the George - was much smaller and was purchased rather than built for the Navy.

- Lion (1536) – taken to pieces 1552
- Jennet (1539) – rebuilt as a galleon 1558
- Dragon (1542) – taken to pieces 1552
- Greyhound (1545) – rebuilt as a galleon 1558
- George (1546) - taken to pieces 1558

Second group The four ships built to this type (together with two similar vessels captured from the Scots) were four-masted galleasses with a higher forecastle. They also had three or four pairs of gunports on the lower deck, but also a couple of smaller pairs on the half-deck above.

- New Bark (1543) – rebuilt as a galleon 1558
- Swallow (1544) – rebuilt as a galleon 1558
- Unicorn (captured 1544 from the Royal Scots Navy) – taken to pieces 1552
- Salamander (built 1537 in France and captured 1544 from the Royal Scots Navy) – condemned 1559
- Grand Mistress (1545) – sold to take to pieces 1552
- Anne Gallant (1545) – gone by 1560

Last group Also four-masted, these were flush-decked vessels, with the forecastle joined to the half-deck to form a continuous upper deck.

- Hart (1546) – rebuilt as a galleon 1558
- Antelope 38 (1546) – rebuilt as a galleon 1558
- Bull 26 (1546) – rebuilt as a galleon 1570
- Tiger (1546) – rebuilt as a galleon 1570

==== Other small vessels ====
These were classed as pinnaces

  - Great Zebra (1522) – last recorded 1525
  - Less Zebra (1522) – last recorded 1525
  - Mary Grace (a hoy Mary of Homflete, captured 1522 from the French) – last recorded 1525
  - Great Pinnace (1544, but may have been the Great Zabra renamed) – last recorded 1545
  - Less Pinnace (1544, but may have been the Less Zabra renamed) – last recorded 1549
  - Falcon (1544) – listed as a ship from 1557, last recorded 1578
  - Roo (built 1545) – captured by the French 1547
  - Marlion or Martin (captured from the French 1545) – last recorded 1549
  - Saker (built 1545) – listed as a ship from 1557, last recorded 1565
  - Hind (built 1545) – listed as a ship from 1557, sold 1557
  - Brigantine (built 1545) – captured by the French 1552
  - Hare (built 1545) – sold 1573
  - Phoenix (purchased 1546) – listed as ship from 1557, rebuilt 1558 and sold 1573
  - Trego Ronnyger (1546) – last recorded 1549

Also in 1546, thirteen armed rowbarges of 20 tons each were built – Double Rose, Flower de Luce (captured by the French in 1562), Sun, Harp, Cloud in the Sun, Hawthorne, Three Ostrich Feathers, Falcon in the Fetterlock, Portcullis, Rose in the Sun, Maidenhead, Roseslip and Gillyflower. The first three of these were rebuilt in 1557–58 and classed as pinnaces, the next five named above were sold in 1548–49 (for £154.4.0d each) and the last five were condemned in 1552.

=== Edward VI (additions 1547–1553) ===
Notwithstanding the considerable number of minor additions below, few significant vessels were added during this brief reign, and the majority of those that were added are prizes. Except where a fate is stated below, all the following were only listed as king's ships in the year quoted in brackets, and did not appear subsequently in records.

  - Black Pinnace 17 (1548)
  - Spanish Shallop 7 (1548)
  - Great Bark Aiger (1549)
  - Black Galley (captured 1549) – retaken by the French in the same year
  - Swift (1549) – listed to 1558
  - Moon 12 (1549) – wrecked 1553 off West Africa
  - Seven Stars (1549) – listed to 1558
  - Mary Norwell (1549)
  - John (captured 1549)
  - Lion (ex-Royal Scots Navy, captured 1549)
  - Margaret (1549)
  - Nicholas (captured 1549)
  - Katherine (captured 1549)
  - Small Swallow (1549)
  - Bark of Bullen (1550) – given away in 1553
  - Jer Falcon (1550) – condemned 1558
  - Edward Bonaventure (1551) – wrecked 1556 at Aberdeen.

=== Mary I (additions 1553–1558) ===
Contrary to the subsequent Elizabethan propaganda that Mary's reign neglected the Navy, this brief reign saw the addition of the first real galleons (all Henry's new or rebuilt big ships had been carracks) – the first three detailed below – and the rebuilding of six former galleasses to the galleon concept, as well as the commencement of a larger vessel ordered under the name Edward, which was to be launched as Elizabeth Jonas in the first few months of Elizabeth's reign.

Type of vessel	Name of vessel	Launched	Tons BM	Carriage Guns	Fate
Galleon	Philip and Mary	1554	550	38	Rebuilt 1584 as Nonpareil
Galleon	Mary Rose	1556	600	38	Rebuilt 1589
Galleon	Golden Lion	1557	600	38	Rebuilt 1582

- Smaller Galleons (ex-galleasses)
  - Jennet (rebuilt in 1558 from galleass of 1539) – deleted 1589
  - New Bark (rebuilt in 1558 from galleass of 1543) – condemned 1565
  - Swallow (rebuilt in 1558 from galleass of 1544) – rebuilt again 1580
  - Greyhound (rebuilt in 1558 from galleass of 1545) – wrecked 1563
  - Hart (rebuilt in 1558 from galleass of 1546) – deleted 1568
  - Antelope (rebuilt in 1558 from galleass of 1546) – deleted 1568

Note the number of guns given above is nominal. The much greater figures usually quoted include small/light cast-iron (anti-personnel) weapons, whereas the figures quoted here reflect the approximate number of carriage-mounted heavy bronze guns positioned on the lower or upper deck for anti-ship fire.

=== Elizabeth I (additions 1558–1603) ===
- Galleons
  Note that the Primrose and Victory, purchased in 1560, were originally classed as "ships" rather than galleons, but the latter was rebuilt as a galleon in 1586.
  - Elizabeth Jonas 56 (built 1557–1559) – rebuilt in 1597–98
  - Hope 34 (built 1559) – rebuilt in 1604
  - Triumph (built 1561) – rebuilt in 1595–96
  - White Bear 40 (built 1564) – rebuilt in 1598–99
  - Bonaventure (purchased 1567) – sometimes called Elizabeth Bonaventure. Rebuilt 1581; BU 1611.
  - Foresight 37 (built 1570) – the prototype "race-built" galleon – BU 1604
  - Bull (rebuilt in 1570 from galleass of 1546) – deleted 1589
  - Tiger (rebuilt in 1570 from galleass of 1546) – deleted 1605
  - Dreadnought 41 (built 1573) – BU 1645
  - Swiftsure (built 1573) – rebuilt 1592
  - Revenge (built 1577) – sunk 1591 in action against Spanish
  - Dainty (built 1588) – captured by the Spanish in July 1594
  - Aid (rebuilt in 1580 from ship of 1562) – broken up 1599
  - Golden Lion 38 (rebuilt in 1582 from ship of 1557) – rebuilt again in 1609 when renamed Red Lion (although usually each version was contracted to Lion)
  - Nonpareil 38 (rebuilt in 1584 from Philip and Mary of 1556) – rebuilt 1603 again and renamed Nonsuch .
  - Rainbow 40 (built 1586) – Rebuilt 1617
  - Vanguard 40 (built 1586) – Rebuilt 1615
  - Ark Royal 44 (built 1587) – Built 1587 as the Ark Ralegh as a private venture for Sir Walter Ralegh, but purchased for the Queen while building and renamed Ark Royal. Rebuilt 1608 when renamed Anne Royal; wrecked 1636.
  - Popinjay (built 1587) – condemned 1601.
  - Mary Rose 38 (rebuilt 1589 from ship of 1556) – condemned 1618.
  - Defiance 46 (built 1590) – rebuilt in 1614, sold 1650
  - Garland 46 (built 1590) – sunk as a breakwater 1618
  - Crane Group
    - Answer 21 (built 1590) – sold 1629
    - Advantage 18 (built 1590) – burned 1613
    - Crane 24 (built 1590) – sold 1629
    - Quittance 25 (built 1590) – condemned 1618
  - Merhonour 39 (built 1590) – rebuilt 1612–15, sold 1650
  - Adventure (built 1594) – BU 1645
  - Due Repulse 40/48 (built 1595) – also known as Repulse, rebuilt 1610
  - Warspite 29 (built 1596) – converted to lighter 1635
  - Saint Andrew 50 (Spanish San Andreas, captured 1596) – given away 1604
  - Saint Matthew 50 (Spanish San Mateo, captured 1596) – given away 1604
- Galleys
  - Speedwell (captured 1560 from the French) – broken up 1580
  - Trywright (captured 1560 from the French) – broken up 1579
  - Ellynore (presented 1562 by the French) – renamed Bonavolia 1584, sold 1600
  - Mercury (built 1592) – sold 1611
  - La Superlativa (built 1601) – condemned 1618, sold 1629
  - La Advantagia (built 1601) – condemned 1618, sold 1629
  - La Volatillia (built 1602) – condemned 1618, sold 1629
  - La Gallarita (built 1602) – condemned 1618, sold 1629
- Other ships
  - Sprite (captured from the French 1558) – deleted 1559
  - Minion (purchased 1558) – sold 1570
  - Bark of Bullen (built 1669) – deleted 1578
  - Mary Grace (storeship, captured 1560) – deleted 1562
  - Aid (1562) – rebuilt 1580 as a galleon
  - Post (brigantine, built 1562) – deleted 1566
  - Makeshift (brigantine, built 1563) – deleted 1564
  - Search (brigantine, built 1563) – sold 1564
  - Guide (brigantine, built 1563) – deleted 1563
  - Swallow (1573) – rebuilt 1580; condemned 1603.
  - Sunne, 5-gun pinnace, 1586. First ship recorded built at the Chatham Dockyard
  - Tramontana (bark, built 1586) – broken up 1618
  - Hart 56
  - San Felipe (ex-Spanish San Felipe, captured 1587) – was not added to the English Navy
  - Black Dog (captured 1590) – not listed after 1590
  - Lion's Whelp (acquired 1590) – lost at sea 1591
  - Primrose Hoy (hoy, built 1590) – condemned 1618
  - French Frigate (pinnace, captured from the French 1591) – renamed Primrose 1612, condemned 1618
  - Pinnace, name unknown, c1592. Armed with set of 12 matched cannon, unlike the mixed cannon usually used at the time. Site discovered and several cannon recovered in 2009
  - Flight (built 1592) – not listed after 1592
  - Madre de Dios (ex-Portuguese carrack Madre de Dios, captured 1592) – was not added to the English Navy
  - Eagle (hulk, ex Eagle of Lubeck, purchased 1592) – sold 1683
  - Flirt (acquired 1592) – not mwentionred after 1592
  - Hawk (exploration vessel, acquired 1593) – not listed after 1593
  - Minnikin (acquired 1594) – not listed after 1595
  - Francis (exploration vessel, acquired 1595) – captured by Spain 1595
  - Splendid (acquired 1597) – not listed after 1597
  - Daisy (pink, acquired 1599) – not listed after 1599
  - Bear (built 1599) – not listed after 1599
  - Discovery (exploration vessel, acquired 1600) – deleted 1620
  - Lion's Whelp (ketch, purchased 1601) – given away 1625

== List of English warships (1603–1642) ==
Number of carriage-mounted (or similar) guns follows name (see Rating system of the Royal Navy). For many early warships, the published "number of guns" included smaller anti-personnel weapons (mounted on swivels), whereas for strict comparison with later data only carriage-mounted heavy guns should be included.
The major ships (from 1618 onwards) are included in pages 158–159 of The Ship of the Line, Volume I, by Brian Lavery, published by Conways, 1983, ISBN 0-85177-252-8. Lesser warships ("below the line") are taken from A History of the Administration on the Royal Navy (sic!) 1509–1660, by Michael Oppenheim, published by the Bodley Head, 1896. Both lists are augmented from British Warships in the Age of Sail 1603–1714: Design, Construction, Careers and Fates, by Rif Winfield, published by Seaforth Publishing, 2009, ISBN 978-1-84832-040-6.

=== Major ships existing in 1618 ===
- Ships royal all the ships listed (except Prince Royal) were rebuilds of earlier ships
  - Prince Royal 55 (1610) – which, while a new ship, was built as a replacement for the former Victory.
  - White Bear 51 (1599) – Sold 1629
  - Merhonour 40/44 (1615) – Sold 1650
  - Anne Royal 42 (1608) – ex-Ark Royal, wrecked 1636, refloated and BU 1638?
- Great ships all the ships listed (except Warspite) were rebuilds of earlier ships
  - Due Repulse 40/48 (1610) – also known as Repulse, BU 1645
  - Defiance 38/40 (1615) – Sold 1650
  - Warspite 29 (1596) – Harbour service (converted to lighter) 1635
  - Red Lion 38 (1609) – also known as Lion, rebuilt 1640
  - Vanguard (1615) – Rebuilt 1631
  - Rainbow 40 (1617) – Sunk at Sheerness 1680
  - Nonsuch 38 (1603) – Sold c. 1645
- Middling ships all the ships listed were rebuilds of earlier ships
  - Dreadnought 30/32 (1614) – BU 1648
  - Speedwell 42 (1607) – ex-'Swiftsure, lost 1624
  - Antelope 34/38 (1618) – Burnt 1649

=== New and Rebuilt Ships, James I (1603–1625) ===
For the first time, under the Stuart monarchy, a division of the Navy into different categories was initiated. The largest of the great ships were categorised as ships royal, while the remainder were grouped as middling ships or small ships.
Note that ships royal would under Charles I become the first rank (later first rate) ships; similarly, great ships would become the second rank (later second rate) ships; middling ships would become the third rank (later third rate) ships; and small ships would become the fourth rank (later fourth rate) ships – later to be further sub-divided (about 1650) into fourth, fifth and sixth rates.

- Ships royal (later, first rank ships)
  - Anne Royal 40 guns (1608) – a rebuilding of the Ark Royal of 1587.
  - Prince Royal 51 guns (1610) – a replacement for (not a rebuilding of) the Victory of 1560.
  - Merhonour 40 guns (1615) – a rebuilding of the ship of 1590.
- Great ships (later, second rank ships)
  Originally with 32–34 guns, by 1660 this had increased to 56 guns (64 in the Triumph).
  - Hope 34 guns (1605) – a second rebuilding of the Hope of 1559.
  - Nonsuch 32 guns (1605) – a rebuilding of the Nonpareil of 1584 (itself a rebuilding of the Philip and Mary of 1556.
  - Red Lion 32 guns (1609) – a second rebuilding of the Golden Lion of 1557.
  - Repulse 34 guns (1610) – a rebuilding of the ship of 1596.
  - Defiance 34 guns (1613) – a rebuilding of the ship of 1590.
  - Vanguard 34 guns (1615) – a rebuilding of the ship of 1586.
  - Rainbow 34 guns (1615) – a rebuilding of the ship of 1586.
  - Constant Reformation 42 (1619) – Joined Royalists June 1648, lost September 1651.
  - Victory 42 (1620) – Rebuilt 1666.
  - Swiftsure 42 (1621) – Rebuilt 1654.
  - St George 42 (1622) – Renamed George 1649 but resumed name St George in 1660, hulked 1687 and then sunk as a blockship 1697.
  - St Andrew 42 (1622) – Renamed Andrew 1649 but resumed name St Andrew in 1660, wrecked 1666.
  - Triumph 42 (1623) – Sold 1688.
- Middling ships (later, third rank ships)
  Originally with only 28 or 30 guns, this was raised to 30–34 by 1633 and 40 guns by 1652.
  - Speedwell 29 guns (1607) – a second rebuilding of the Swiftsure of 1592.
  - Dreadnought 28 guns (1614) – a second rebuilding of the ship of 1573.
  - Antelope 30 guns (1618) – a second rebuilding of the ship of 1546.
  - Happy Entrance 28 (1619) – Burnt 1658 by accident.
  - Garland 28 (1620) – Captured by the Netherlands at the Battle of Dungeness, 1652.
  - Bonaventure 30 (1621) – Blew up and sunk at the Battle of Leghorn, 1653.
  - Convertine 30 guns (1620) – built as the Destiny for Sir Walter Ralegh in 1616, and acquired by the Navy in 1620 – sold at Lisbon by the Royalists 1650.
- Small ships (later, fourth rank ships)
  - Phoenix 18 guns (1613) – not mentioned after 1624.
  - Mary Rose 26 (1623) – Wrecked 1650.

=== New and rebuilt ships, Charles I (1625–1642) ===
Note that this list only included the first part of Charles's reign preceding the English Civil War (i.e. up to 1642), Subsequent acquisitions are listed in the following section.

- First rank (ships royal)
  - Sovereign of the Seas 102 (1637) – Renamed Sovereign in 1649, renamed Royal Sovereign in 1660, rebuilt 1659-1660
  - Prince Royal First Rank, 70 (rebuilt 1641) – Rearmed to 80, rebuilt again 1663
- Second rank (great ships)
  - Rainbow Second Rank, 40 (rebuilt 1629) – Rearmed to 56 guns by 1660, sunk as a breakwater 1680.
  - Vanguard Second Rank, 40 (rebuilt 1631) – Rearmed to 56, wrecked, sold 1667
  - Charles 44 (1632) – Renamed Liberty 1649, wrecked 1650
  - Henrietta Maria 42 (1633) – Renamed Paragon 1650, lost 1655
  - James 48 (c. 1634) – rearmed as 60 guns by 1660, sold 1682
  - Unicorn 46 (1634) – rearmed as 56 guns by 1660, sold 1688
- Third rank (middling ships)
  - Swallow 34 (1634)
  - Leopard 34 (1635) – Captured by Netherlands 1653
  - Lion 40 (rebuilt 1640 from Second Rate) – Rebuilt again 1658

=== Lesser ships ===
Early frigates

- Roebuck 10 (1636) – Collision 1641
- Greyhound 12 (1636) – Blown up in action 1656

1637 Group

- Expedition 14/30 (1637) – Sold 1667
- Providence 14/30 (1637) – Wrecked 1668

=== Captured ships, 1625–1636 ===
- Saint Claude (ex-French, captured 1625)
- Saint Denis 38 (ex-French, captured 1625)
- Saint Mary (ex-French, captured 1625)
- Saint Anne (ex-French, captured 1626)
- Esperance (ex-French, captured 1626)
- Fortune (ex-French, captured 1627)
- Saint Esprit 42 (ex-Dutch, captured 1627 from French)
- Swan (ex-Dunkirker, captured 1635) – Sunk 1638
- Nicodemus 6 (ex-Dunkirker, captured 1636) – Sold 1657

== List of major English warships of the English Civil War, the Commonwealth and Protectorate (1642–1660) ==
The interregnum between the execution of Charles I in 1649 and the Restoration of royal authority in 1660 saw the full emergence of the ship-of-the-line and its employment during the first Anglo-Dutch War. During this period the English navy technically became first the Commonwealth Navy, later the Protectorate Navy and subsequently the Commonwealth Navy again; the prefix "HMS" is thus not applicable to any English warship during the Interregnum. In fact, the abbreviated form "HMS" was not used until nearly the end of the following century, with the term "His Majesty's Ship" (formally altered to "Their Majesties' Ship" between 1689 and 1694, when William I and Mary II were co-rulers, and to "Her Majesty's Ship" between 1702 and 1714, and again from 1837 to 1901, when there was a queen on the throne) always appearing in full.

The following lists include ships of the line, i.e. vessels of the first, second, third and fourth rates which were judged fit to stand in the line of battle. Smaller warships of the fifth and sixth rates, and the even smaller unrated vessels, appear in the subsequent section.

Under the categorisation as amended in late 1653, the rates were based on the number of men in the established complement of a ship, as follows:

- First rate, 400 men and over.
- Second rate, 300 men and up to 399.
- Third rate, 200 men and up to 299.
- Fourth rate, 140 men and up to 199.

However, there were numerous exceptions, and ships changed their Rating from time to time.

Number of main guns follows name (see rating system of the Royal Navy)
The larger ships are listed in pages 159–160 of The Ship of the Line Volume I, by Brian Lavery, published by Conways, 1983, ISBN 0-85177-252-8, and more fully in British Warships in the Age of Sail: 1603–1714, by Rif Winfield, published by Seaforth Publishing, 2009, ISBN 978-1-84832-040-6. Lesser warships ("below the line") are taken from A History of the Administration on the Royal Navy (sic!) 1509–1660, by Michael Oppenheim, published by the Bodley Head, 1896, as well as from Winfield's book.

The frigates listed here are not the type of vessel known as frigates in the 18th and 19th centuries. The term in the 17th century signified a fast vessel, with low superstructure to give more stability.

=== First and second rates (three-decked ships) ===
A programme comprising four second rates of 60 guns each was adopted in 1654. However, of these four ships the Naseby was completed as a first rate, while the Richard was reclassed as a first rate in 1660 (and renamed).

- First rate
  - Naseby 80 (1655) – Renamed Royal Charles 1660, captured by the Netherlands, 1667, BU.
- Second rates
  - Richard 70 (1658) – Renamed Royal James 1660, burnt 1667.
  - Dunbar 64 (1656) – Renamed Henry 1660, rearmed to 82, burnt by accident in 1682.
  - London 64 (1656) – Blown up by accident in 1665.

=== Early frigates (fourth rates) ===
- The 'first' English frigate
  - Constant Warwick 32 (1645) built as a private venture; she was hired by the Navy from 1646, and purchased outright in 1649 – BU 1666 for rebuild
- 1646 programme group
  - Assurance 32 (1646) – Sold 1698
  - Adventure 34 (1646) – BU 1688 for rebuild
  - Nonsuch 34 (1646) – Wrecked 1664
- 1647 programme group
  - Dragon 32 (1647) – BU 1690 for rebuild
  - Elizabeth 32 (1647) – Burnt 1667
  - Phoenix 32 (1647) – Captured by the Netherlands at the Battle of Elba, 1652, recaptured 1652, wrecked 1664
  - Tiger 32 (1647) – BU 1681 for rebuild

=== Later frigates (third and fourth rates) ===
- Great frigate (second rate)
  - Antelope 56 (c. 1651) – Wrecked 1652
- Speaker group third rate frigates
  - Fairfax 52 (c. 1650) – Burnt 1653
  - Speaker 50 (c. 1650) – Renamed Mary 1660
- 1649 programme group, third rate frigates
  - Worcester 48 (c. 1651) – Renamed Dunkirk 1660
- 1652 programme group, third rate frigates
  - Essex 48 (c. 1653) – Captured by the Netherlands at the Four Days Battle, 1666
- Speaker-class, third rate frigates (part of 1652 programme)
  - Gloucester 50 (1654) – Rearmed to 54, rearmed to 60, wrecked 1682
  - Plymouth 52 (c. 1653)
  - Torrington 52 (c. 1654) – Renamed Dreadnought 1660, rearmed to 62, sank 1690
  - Newbury 52 (c. 1654) – Renamed Revenge 1660, condemned 1678
  - Bridgewater 52 (c. 1654) – Renamed Anne 1660, blew up 1673
  - Lyme 52 (c. 1654) – Renamed Montague 1660
  - Marston Moor 52 (c. 1654) – Renamed York 1660, wrecked 1703
  - Langport 50 (c. 1654) – Renamed Henrietta 1660, wrecked 1689
  - Fairfax 52 (c. 1653) – Wrecked 1674
  - Tredagh 50 (c. 1654) – Renamed Resolution 1660, burnt at the St. James' Day Battle, 1666
- Later third rate frigates
  - Monck 52 (c. 1659)
- 1649 programme group, fourth rate frigates
  - Portsmouth 34 (1650) – Blew up 1689
  - President 34 (1650) – Renamed Bonaventure 1660
- 1650 programme group, fourth rate frigates
  - Foresight 34 (1650) – Wrecked 1698
  - Assistance 34 (1650)
  - Reserve 34 (1650)
  - Advice 34 (1650)
  - Pelican 34 (1650) – Burnt 1656
  - Centurion 34 (1650) – Wrecked 1689
- 1651 programme group, fourth rate frigates
  - Laurel 34 (1651) – Rearmed to 46, wrecked 1657
  - Sapphire 34 (1651) – Wrecked 1671
  - Bristol 38/40 (1653) – Rearmed to 44
- Ruby class (part of 1651 programme)
  - Ruby 40 (1651) – Captured by France at the Battle at The Lizard, 1707
  - Diamond 40 (1652) – Captured by France 1693
- 1652 programme group, fourth rate frigates
  - Kentish 40 (1652) – Renamed Kent 1660, wrecked 1672
  - Sussex 38/40 (1652) – Rearmed to 46, blew up 1653
  - Portland 40 (1653) – Burnt to avoid capture 1692
  - Hampshire 38 (1653) – Rearmed to 46
- 1653 programme group, fourth rate frigates
  - Gainsborough 38/40 (1653) – Renamed Swallow 1660, wrecked 1692
  - Preston 40 (1653) – Renamed Antelope 1660, sold 1693
  - Nantwich 38/40 (1654) – Renamed Bredah 1660, wrecked 1666
  - Jersey 38/40 (1654) – Captured by France 1691
  - Maidstone 40/48 (1654) – Renamed Mary Rose 1660, – Captured by France 1691
  - Taunton 40 (1654) – Renamed Crown 1660, rearmed to 48
  - Dover 40 (1654) – Rearmed to 48
- Large type (built as 44-gun, later raised in stages to 54 guns)
  - Newcastle 44 (1653) – Wrecked 1703
  - Yarmouth 44 (1653) – BU 1680
  - Winsby 44 (1654) – Renamed Happy Return 1660, captured by France 1691
  - Leopard 44 (1659) – Scuttled 1699
  - Princess 44 (1660) – BU 1680

=== Major rebuilds ===
- Sovereign 100 (1660) – Rebuilt 1685
- Swiftsure 60 (1654) – Captured by the Dutch 1667
- Lion 48 (c. 1658) – re-armed at 60 by 1677. Sold 1698

=== Captures of the First Anglo-Dutch War ===
The following list covers only the major vessels, all taken from the Dutch and added to the Commonwealth Navy as fourth rates; several dozen further small vessels were also captured from the Dutch during this war, and added to the Protectorate Navy, usually as fifth rate or sixth rate vessels.

- White Raven 36 (ex-Dutch, captured 1652) – captured by Dutch privateers 1654.
- Hound 36 (ex-Dutch Hasewind, captured 1652) – hulked 1656 and sold 1660.
- Princess Maria 38 (ex-Dutch Prinses Royaal Maria, captured 1652) – wrecked 1658.
- Dolphin 30 (ex-Dutch Dolfijn, captured 1652) – sold 1657.
- Sophia 38 (ex-Dutch Sophia, captured 1652) – sold 1667.
- Stork 36 (ex-Dutch Ooievaar, captured 1652) – Hulked 1653 and sold 1663.
- Violet 44 (ex-Dutch, captured 1652) – Hulked 1653 and broken up 1672.
- Heatsease 36 (ex-Dutch, captured 1652) – Sold 1656.
- Welcome 36 (ex-Dutch, captured 1652) – Expended as fireship 1673.
- Oak 32 (ex-Dutch, captured 1652) – burnt by fireship 1653.
- Bear 36 (ex-Dutch Beer, captured 1652) – given to Ordnance Board 1666.
- Tulip 32 (ex-Dutch, captured 1652) – Sold 1657.
- Sampson 32 (ex-Dutch Samsun, captured 1652) – Sold 1658.
- Cardiff 36 (ex-Dutch Fortun, captured 1652) – Sold 1658.
- Black Raven 38 (ex-Dutch Zwarte Raaf, captured 1653) – Sold 1654.
- Ostrich/Estridge (ex-Dutch Vogelstruys, captured 1653) – hulked 1653, and sunk as a breakwater 1679.
- Golden Cock 36 (ex-Dutch Vergulde Haan, captured 1653) – Sold 1656.
- Great Charity 44 (ex-Dutch Groote Liefde, captured 1653) – recaptured by Netherlands 1665.
- Little Charity 38 (ex-Dutch Gecroonde Liefde, captured 1653) – Sold 1656.
- Elias 36 (ex-Dutch Elias, captured 1653) – Wrecked 1664.
- Westergate 38 (ex-Dutch Westergo, captured 1653) – foundered 1664.
- Mathias 38 (ex-Dutch Sint Mattheus, captured 1653) – Burnt by the Dutch 1667.
- Half Moon 34 (ex-Dutch Halve Maan, captured 1653) – sold 1660.
- Rosebush 32 (ex-Dutch Rozeboom, captured 1653) – hulked 1664 and sold 1668.
- Indian 44 (ex-Dutch East Indiaman Roos van Amsterdam, captured 1654) – Sold 1660.

=== Captures from the Royalists ===
- Guinea 30 (ex-Royalist Charles, captured 1649, ex-merchantman Guinea Frigate) – Sold 1667.
- Marigold 30 (ex-Royalist Crowned Lion, captured 1650) – Sold 1658.
- Gillyflower 32 (ex-Royalist Saint Michael, captured 1651, ex-merchantman Archangel San Miguel) – Sold 1667
- Marmaduke 42 (ex-Royalist Revenge of Whitehall, captured 1652, ex-merchantman Marmaduke) – sunk as a blockship 1667.

=== Captures from the Portuguese ===
- Convertine 44 (ex-Portuguese, probably the Nossa Senhora da Natividade) – Captured October 1650. There is a small possibility that this may be the same ship as the earlier Convertine of 1620, which had been left behind in Lisbon by the Royalist fleet, but most experts are sceptical. Captured by the Netherlands 1666, and then retaken from the Netherlands by a Scottish privateer in 1667, but not returned to the Royal Navy.
- A second Portuguese ship, the São Pedro de Lisboa, was also captured in October 1650, but was not added to the English Commonwealth Navy.

=== Captures from the French ===
- Success 38 (ex-French Jules) – captured 1650, renamed Old Success 1660 and sold 1662
- Crow 36 (ex-French Croissant) – captured 1652 and sold 1656.
- Gift 36 (ex-French Don de Dieu) – captured 1652, renamed Great Gift in 1658, converted to a fireship in 1666 and expended as a fireship on 25 July 1666.
- Fortune 36 (ex-French Fortunee) – captured 1652 and sold 1654.

=== Other ships ===
- John 28
- Amity 30 (ex-merchantman) – Sold 1667

For ships-of-the-line of the Royal Navy, successor to the Protectorate Navy after 1660, see List of ships of the line of the Royal Navy

== List of smaller English warships of the English Civil War, the Commonwealth and Protectorate (1642–1660) ==
(Note: This list has been completed for purpose-built craft, but numerous captured and purchased vessels need to be added.)

In principle, vessels with an established complement of fewer than 150 were classed (from late 1653) as fifth rate (with between 80 and 139 men), sixth rate (with between 50 and 79 men), or as unrated (with fewer than 50 men). However, there were numerous exceptions, and a large number of vessels changed categories during their service lives.

- Purchased vessels of the 1640s.
  - Cygnet 18, purchased 1643, sold 1654.
  - Hector 22, purchased 1644, sold 1656.
- Captured vessels of the 1640s.
  - Fellowship 28, captured from Royalists 1643, sold 1662.
  - Warwick 22, captured from Royalists 1643, sold 1660.
  - Globe 24, captured from Royalists 1644, sold 1648.
  - Swann 12, captured from Royalists 1645, wrecked 1653.
  - Satisfaction 20, purchased 1646, wrecked 1662.
- Fifth rates, 1651 programme
  - Pearl 22, built 1651, sunk as a breakwater 1697.
  - Mermaid 22, built 1651, rebuilt 1689.
  - Primrose 22, built 1651, wrecked 1656.
  - Nightingale 22, built 1651, wrecked 1674.
- Sixth rates, 1652 programme
  - Drake 14, built 1652, sold 1691.
  - Merlin 14, built 1652, captured by the Dutch 1665.
  - Martin 14, built 1652, sold 1667.
- Fifth rates, 1653 programme
  - Colchester 22, built 1654, sunk 1667.
  - Islip 22, built 1654, wrecked 1655.
  - Fagons 22, built 1654, renamed Milford 1660, burnt 1673.
  - Selby 22, built 1654, renamed Eagle 1660, sunk as a breakwater 1694.
  - Basing 22, built 1654, renamed Guernsey 1660, taken to pieces 1693.
  - Grantham 22, built 1654, renamed Garland 1660, sold 1698.
- Fifth rates, 1654 programme
  - Norwich 22, built 1655, wrecked 1682.
  - Pembroke 22, built 1655, foundered 1667 after collision.
  - Dartmouth 22, built 1655, wrecked 1690.
  - Cheriton 22, built 1656, renamed Speedwell 1660, wrecked 1676.
  - Wakefield 22, built 1656, renamed Richmond 1660, sold 1698.
  - Oxford 22, built 1656, destroyed in explosion 1669.
- Fifth rates, 1656 programme
  - Forrester 22, built 1657, destroyed in explosion 1672.
  - Bradford 24, built 1658, renamed Success 1660, wrecked 1680.
- Sixth rates and unrated vessels, 1657 programme

(note these six were ketch-rigged, three being classed as sixth rates and three being unrated)

  - Cygnet 4, built 1657.
  - Lily 4, built 1657.
  - Hart 4, built 1657.
  - Swallow 4, built 1657.
  - Parrot 4, built 1657.
  - Rose 4, built 1657.
- Fifth rates, captured from the Royalists (1651–1655)
  - Tresco 24, taken 1651, wrecked 1651.
  - Bryer 22, taken 1651, given away 1667.
  - Peacock 18, taken 1651, sold 1658.
  - Lizard 16, taken 1653, expended as a fireship 1666.
  - Sorlings 22, taken 1654, wrecked 1667.
  - Wexford 20, taken 1655, expended as a fireship 1665.

== See also ==
- Royal Navy
- List of ship names of the Royal Navy
