= List of ship launches in the 16th century =

This list of ship launches in the 16th century includes a chronological list of some ships launched from 1500 to 1599.

Date of Launch	Ship	Class / type	Builder	Location	Country	Notes
1502	Flor de la Mar	Carrack	Lisbon shipyards	Lisbon	Portugal	
1505	Margaret	Warship		Leith	Kingdom of Scotland	For Scottish navy
1510	Peter Pomegranate	Warship		Portsmouth	England	For Tudor Navy
July 1511	Mary Rose	Carrack		Portsmouth	England	For Tudor Navy
12 October 1511	Great Michael	Carrack	Newhaven dock	Newhaven	Kingdom of Scotland	Largest ship afloat when launched
13 June 1514	Henry Grace à Dieu	Carrack	Woolwich Dockyard	Kent	England	Largest ship afloat when launched
1518	La Dauphine	Carrack	Royal Dockyard	Le Havre	Kingdom of France	Part of Giovanni da Verrazzano's first voyage to the New World
1520	Jesus of Lübeck	Carrack		Lübeck	Free City of Lübeck	
1520	Santa Catarina do Monte Sinai	Carrack	Kochi Shipyard	Kochi	Portugal	
21 December 1522	Santa Anna	Carrack		Malta	Knights Hospitaller	
1530	São João Baptista	War galleon			Portugal	
1538	Réale	Galley			Kingdom of France	
1543	Pyroscaph	Claimed to be a paddle steamer	Blasco de Garay	Barcelona	Spain	For Blasco de Garay.
1546	Antelope	War galleon			England	For Tudor Navy
1556	Mary Rose	War galleon			England	For Tudor Navy
1557	Golden Lion	Warship	Deptford Dockyard	London	England	For Tudor Navy
1559	Cinco Chagas	Carrack		Goa	Portugal	For Viceroy Dom Constantino de Braganza
1559	Elizabeth Jonas	War galleon	Woolwich Dockyard	Kent	England	
1559	Hope	War galleon	Deptford Dockyard	London	England	For Royal Navy
1562	Aid	Armed ship	Deptford Dockyard	London	England	For Royal Navy
1562	Triumph	War galleon	Deptford Dockyard	London	England	
1563	Mars	Warship			Sweden	
1563	White Bear	Warship	Woolwich Dockyard	Kent	England	
1566	Adler von Lübeck	War galleon	Wallhalbinsel	Lübeck	Hanseatic League	One of the largest contemporary ships
1566	Philip and Mary	War galleon	Deptford Dockyard	London	England	For Royal Navy
1568	Real	Galley	Barcelona Royal Shipyard	Barcelona	Spanish Empire	For Armada Real
1570	Foresight	War galleon	Deptford Dockyard	London	England	For Royal Navy
1570	La Juliana			Barcelona	Spanish Empire	Part of the Spanish Armada
1573	Dreadnought	War galleon	Deptford Dockyard	London	England	For Royal Navy
1573	Swiftsure	War galleon	Deptford Dockyard	London	England	
1577	Pelican	Galleon			England	Known as Golden Hind, flagship of Francis Drake's circumnavigation of the world
1577	Revenge	Race-built galleon	Deptford Dockyard	London	England	For Royal Navy
1577	Swiftsure	Pinnace			England	
1570s	Squirrel	Exploration vessel			England	
1583	Delight	Sailing ship			England	Part of Sir Humphrey Gilbert's expedition to Newfoundland
1585	Fin de la guerre	Fighting platform		Antwerp	Dutch Republic	Sortie in the Fall of Antwerp
1586	Rainbow	War galleon	Deptford Dockyard	London	England	For Royal Navy
1586	Vanguard	War galleon	Woolwich Dockyard	Kent	England	For Royal Navy
1587	Ark Raleigh	War galleon	Deptford Dockyard	London	England	For Sir Walter Raleigh
1587	Nuestra Señora del Rosario	First-rate ship of the line	Vicente Alvarez	Ribadeo	Spanish Empire	For Armada Real
1588	Repentance	Race-built galleon	Richard Hawkins	London	England	
1589	Madre de Deus	Carrack		Lisbon	Portugal	
1590	Advantage	Small galleon	Peter & Joseph Pett	London	England	One of the first named vessels in the Royal Navy.
1590	Answer	Small galleon	Matthew Baker	London	England	One of the first named vessels in the Royal Navy.
1590	Crane	Small galleon	Richard Chapman	London	England	One of the first named vessels in the Royal Navy.
1590	Defiance	War galleon			England	For Royal Navy
1590	Merhonour	Warship	Woolwich Dockyard	Kent	England	
1593	Cinco Chagas	Carrack	Constantino de Braganza	Goa	Portugal	
1593	Rahīmī	Hajj ship		India	Mughal Empire	For Emperor Akbar
1594	Adventure	Galley	Deptford Dockyard	London	England	One of the first named vessels in the English and Royal Navies.
1595	Duyfken	Yacht			Dutch Republic	
1595	Scourge of Malice	Armed ship	Deptford Dockyard	London	England	For East India Company
1596	Repulse	Armed ship	Deptford Dockyard	London	England	For Royal Navy
1596	Warspite	Great ship	Deptford Dockyard	London	England	
1597	Hoop	East Indiaman			Dutch Republic	For Dutch East India Company
Unknown	Bazana	Galley			Spanish Empire	Part of the Spanish Armada
Unknown	Bom Jesus	East Indiaman carrack		Lisbon	Portugal	Oldest shipwreck on west coast of Sub-Saharan Africa
Unknown	Bonaventure	War galleon			England	Commanded by Sir Francis Drake
Unknown	Concepción	Carrack			Spanish Empire	Part of the Magellan-Elcano expedition to the Spice Islands
Unknown	Desire	Flagship			England	Flagship of Thomas Cavendish's circumnavigation of the world
Unknown	Mendam Berahi	Royal ghali			Malacca Sultanate	
Unknown	Nuestra Señora de la Concepción	War galleon			Spanish Empire	Prize of Sir Francis Drake
Unknown	Salamander	Warship		France	Kingdom of Scotland	For Royal Scots Navy
Unknown	San Antonio	Galleon			Spanish Empire	
Unknown	San Esteban	Carrack			Spanish Empire	
Unknown	Santa Maria de Vison	Merchantman		Ragusa	Spanish Empire	
Unknown	São Bento	Carrack			Portugal	
Unknown	São Martinho	War galleon			Portugal	
Unknown	Tarihi Kadırga	Galley	Imperial Shipyard	Constantinople	Ottoman Empire	
Unknown	Treasurer	Warship			Kingdom of Scotland	
Unknown	Victoria	Carrack			Spanish Empire	
