= English ship Vanguard (1586) =

English warship, built 1586

History

England
- Name: Vanguard
- Builder: Matthew Baker, Woolwich Dockyard
- Launched: 1586
- Fate: Broken up to rebuild, 1630
- Notes: Participated in: Spanish Armada

General characteristics as built
- Class & type: 36-gun galleon
- Tons burthen: 500
- Length: 108 ft (33 m) (keel)
- Beam: 32 ft (9.8 m)
- Depth of hold: 13 ft (4.0 m)
- Complement: 600 men
- Armament: 36 guns of various weights of shot

General characteristics after 1599 rebuild
- Tons burthen: 561.6
- Length: 108 ft (33 m) (keel)
- Beam: 32 ft (9.8 m)

General characteristics after 1615 rebuild
- Class & type: Great ship
- Tons burthen: 665 tons
- Length: 102 ft (31 m) (keel)
- Beam: 35 ft (11 m)
- Sail plan: Full-rigged ship
- Armament: 38 guns of various weights of shot

The Vanguard (Note: The 'HMS' prefix was not used until the middle of the 18th century, but is sometimes applied retrospectively) was a 36-gun galleon of the English Tudor navy, built by Master Shipwright Matthew Baker and launched in 1586 from Woolwich Dockyard. She was the first ship of the navy to bear the name.

She played a key part in the action against the Spanish Armada in 1588.

== Construction ==
Vanguard was ordered by Elizabeth I at a cost of at around £3000. Work was underway at Woolwich Dockyard by March 1586, under the supervision of shipwright Mathew Baker. Vanguard was one of a generation of race-built galleons that represented the pinnacle of ship design at that time.

By October 1587, Vanguard was being held in readiness at Chatham, needing only caulking before being seaworthy.

== Career ==
On commissioning, Vanguard joined the squadron under the command of Sir Henry Palmer which was blockading the coast of the Low Countries. The ship was refitted at Sheerness in the winter of 1587–1588, and with William Wynter in command, rejoined the forces patrolling off Dunkirk. In April that year, while much of the fleet was sent to Plymouth to guard against the expected Spanish invasion, Vanguard was part of a squadron under Lord Henry Seymour that was ordered to remain at the Downs to watch the army of the Duke of Parma in the Spanish Netherlands. Seymour's squadron, including Vanguard, rejoined the main English fleet off Calais on 7 August, and took part in the Battle of Gravelines the next day.

George Beeston anchored the ship in the Forth at Leith on 1 June 1589, in order to deliver messages to the court of James VI. One of Beeston's crew, the trumpeter, was killed ashore in Edinburgh in a fight with Spanish sailors.

In January 1590, Vanguard was one of two ships sent to withdraw Lord Willoughby's expeditionary force from France.

In 1594, Vanguard was recommissioned to serve as the flagship of Martin Frobisher, when Frobisher was ordered to help drive out Spanish forces from Brittany, a campaign that culminated in the Siege of Fort Crozon and the fatal wounding of Frobisher.

On 1 June 1596, Vanguard, under the command of Sir Robert Mansell, set out from Plymouth as part of an Anglo-Dutch expedition against Cádiz, Spain, under the overall command of Lord Howard of Effingham and the Earl of Essex, with Vanguard carrying Sir John Wingfield and his company of soldiers. The fleet arrived off Cadíz on 20 June, and attacked at dawn the next day. Vanguard, together with Rainbow, were tasked with fighting Spanish galleys, while other ships took on the four Spanish galleons that guarded the entrance to the port. The galleys were driven back, and Vanguard joined the fight against the four Spanish galleons, and within a few hours, the Spanish warships were captured or sunk, and Cadíz captured. Vanguard was paid off at Chatham Dockyard on her return from the expedition.

Vanguard recommissioned in the summer of 1597, rejoining Palmer's squadron with its duty of patrolling the English Channel and watching Spanish activities in France and the Netherlands. In October that year, when news of the Third Spanish Armada reached England, Vanguard, along with whatever other ships were available, (Note: Much of the English fleet was taking part in the unsuccessful expedition to the Azores, while other large ships were being overhauled or laid up.) were ordered out to engage the Spanish force. Severe storms disrupted the Spanish fleet, however, and no battle followed. In February 1598, when a Spanish convoy was spotted entering Calais, Vanguard was one of a small group of ships, (Note: Vanguard, Answer, Crane, Quittance, Moon and Tremontana) that were sent to investigate and if necessary attack, as it was feared that this was an attempted Spanish raid or invasion on south-east England. In fact this was only a supply convoy. Later that month, Vanguard ferried Robert Cecil, 1st Earl of Salisbury to Dieppe as part of a diplomatic mission to King Henry IV of France. Vanguard continued to serve with the Channel squadron until July 1598.

Vanguard was taken to pieces in 1599 and rebuilt for the first time at Chatham dockyard, and was in dry dock until 1600.

In June 1600, Vanguard, Repulse and Warspite, under the overall command of Richard Leveson, set out on a mission to intercept the Spanish treasure fleet off the Azores, but they failed to find them, not seeing a single Spanish ship before they returned in October that year.

From 1615–17, Vanguard she was rebuilt for a second time, by Phineas Pett at Chatham Dockyard, as a great ship.

In 1620, Sir Robert Mansell, who had commanded Vanguard during the capture of Cadíz in 1596, was appointed to lead an expedition against Algerian piracy. Vanguard, with Sir Richard Hawkins in command as the mission's Vice Admiral, formed part of the fleet which left Plymouth in October 1620. The force arrived off Algiers in December, when Mansell negotiated the release of 40 Englishmen who were being held as slaves, after which Mansell took the fleet to Málaga, where it carried out ineffective patrols with the hope of intercepting pirates. Mansell's fleet attacked Algiers with fireships on 3 June 1621, but little damage was done, and the force was soon recalled to England. For the final month of the expedition, Vanguard served as flagship due to the poor condition of the former flagship, Lyon.

In June 1624, Vanguard, under the command of John Penington, with the Great Neptune and six armed merchant ships, were sent to Dieppe to be loaned to the King of France. The intent was that the ships would serve against the Spanish client state of Genoa. When the ships arrived at Dieppe, it became clear that the French planned to use the ships Protestant Huguenot rebels in a civil war, and Penington refused to let French troops aboard, after the crews mutinied (an action that was encouraged by Penington and the commander of Great Neptune), the ships returned to England. After more direct orders were given to Penington, the ships returned to Dieppe, where they were handed over to the French, who used them against the rebels at La Rochelle, before returning them in 1626. The use of English ships against Protestants caused a scandal domestically and in parliament.

In 1627, war broke out between England and France, with England supporting a fresh revolt by the Huguenots. The Duke of Buckingham led an attack on Île de Ré near La Rochelle, with Vanguard part of Buckingham's invasion force, which left Stokes Bay on 27 June. The siege of the citadel of Saint-Martin-de-Ré continued for four months before Buckingham admitted defeat and reembarked his force, with Vanguard's captain, John Burgh, who was killed attacking Saint-Martin-de-Ré one of 4000 English dead. The Fleet reached home on 11 November and was promptly disbanded by King Charles I, who was however, unable to pay the wages due to Vanguard's crew.

Vanguard put in to Woolwich Dockyard for repairs at the end of 1628, but in 1630 the work was abandoned after the contractors used defective materials. The plans were scrapped, and instead, Vanguard was broken up for parts.

== Legacy ==
Some of Vanguard's timbers were used in the construction of the next Vanguard, launched the following year, and officially recorded as a rebuild of the first Vanguard.
