= Crane Group =

200 ton small galleons

Class overview
- Name: Crane Group
- Builders: Peter Pett I, Radcliffe; Portsmouth Dockyard
- Operators: English Navy Royal
- Preceded by: None
- Succeeded by: 1637 Group
- Built: 1590
- In service: 1590-1629
- Completed: 4
- Lost: 1
- Retired: 3

General characteristics
- Type: Small Ship
- Tons burthen: 200 bm
- Sail plan: ship-rigged
- Complement: 100 - 1603
- Armament: 19 guns

The Crane Group was a group of four 200-ton small galleons built after the defeat of the Spanish Armada in 1588. These vessels were all armed with about 20 guns and were rated in the six tier rating system of 1626 as Fourth Rate ships. They were all gone by the 1630s.

== Design and specifications ==
The ships may have been built in Deptford but not much information survives. The master shipwrights are known but not the exact location of their builds. Only launch years are available for each ship. The dimensions of the vessels is varied and will be shown on the individual pages of each vessel. The gun armaments was also varied though it is known that they carried around nineteen to twenty guns of demi-culverins, sakers, minions and fowlers.

== Ships of the Crane Group ==
Name	Builder	Launch date	Remarks
Crane	Richard Chapman	1590	Sold at Rochester on 17 June 1629
Quittance	Matthew Baker	1590	Condemned 1618
Answer	Matthew Baker	1590	Sold at Rochester on 17 June 1629
Advantage	Peter & Joseph Pett	1590	Burnt by accident in Scotland December 1613
