= English ship Mary Rose (1623) =

English Royal Navy ship (1623)

History

England
- Name: Mary Rose
- Ordered: 3 February 1623
- Builder: Deptford Dockyard
- Launched: 1623
- Commissioned: August 1624
- Fate: Wrecked in a storm March 1650

General characteristics
- Class & type: 24-gun ship
- Tons burthen: 288.6/384.8 tons bm
- Length: 83 ft 0 in (25.3 m) keel
- Beam: 26 ft 9 in (8.2 m)
- Depth of hold: 13 ft 0 in (4.0 m)
- Propulsion: Sail
- Sail plan: ship-rigged
- Complement: 120 (1624)
- Armament: in 1624; 24 guns: 8 × demi-culverins; 10 × sakers; 2 × falcons; 4 × minions

Mary Rose was a 24-gun ship in the service of the English Navy Royal. After commissioning she mainly served in Home waters. With the outbreak of the English Civil War in 1642 she was in the service of the Parliamentary forces, and became part of the Commonwealth of England's Navy in 1649. She served until wrecked off Flanders in March 1650.

Mary Rose was the third vessel in the English Navy Royal to be given this name, since it was first used for a ship built at Portsmouth in 1509, which was rebuilt in 1536 and capsized during an engagement with the French off the Isle of Wight on 19 July 1545; its second use was for a ship built in 1556 or 1557, which was rebuilt in 1589 and lasted until condemned in 1618.

== Construction and specifications ==
She was built at Deptford Dockyard, designed and constructed by Master Shipwright William Burrell. She was the smallest and last of the ten ships built by Burrell as a result of the 1618 Jacobbean Commission of Enquiry, and took the name of the previous great ship of that name condemned in 1618 and expended as a wharf at Chatham. She was ordered on 3 February 1623, launched the same year and commissioned in August 1624. Her dimensions were 83 feet 0 inches (25.3 metres) for keel with a breadth of 26 feet 9 inches (8.2 metres) and a depth in hold of 13 feet 0 inches (4.0 metres). Her tonnage was 288.6 tons (tons and tonnage 384.8 tons); under the new rules for calculating burthen tonnage introduced about 1652, she would have been calculated at 31586/94 tons.

Her gun armament in 1624 was 24 guns consisting of eight demi-culverins, (Note: A demi-culverin was a gun of 3,400 pounds with a four-inch bore firing a 9.5-pound shot with an eight-pound powder charge.) ten sakers, (Note: A sacar or saker was a gun of 1,400 pounds with a 3.5-inch bore firing a 5.5-pound shot with a 5.5-pound powder charge.) four minions (Note: A minion was a gun of 1,000 pounds with a 3.5-inch bore firing a 4-pound shot with a 4-pound powder charge.) and two falcons, (Note: A falcon was a gun of 660 pounds with a 2.5-inch bore firing a 2-pound shot with a 3.5-pound powder charge.) plus two fowlers not included in the count of guns. (Note: A fowler was an anti-personnel breech-loading gun that fired either stone or grape shot. the weapon weighed about 5 cwt and the breech weighed another 1 cwt.) Her manning was around 120 officers and men in 1624.

== Commissioned service ==
=== Service in the Navy Royal ===
The Mary Rose was sent to Spain to collect jewels returned to the English ambassador in July 1624. The ship was threatened by a storm during the return voyage. In August 1624, under the command of Captain Thomas Wilbraham, she scoured the coasts of pirates from Dungeness to Portland. In 1625 she was in Sir Edward Cecil's fleet for the Cadiz expedition. In 1627 Captain Francis Sydenham took over for the expedition to La Rochelle in 1628. In 1635 she had Captain George Carteret as her commander followed by Captain Kenelm Digny for service with Lindsey's Fleet in the English Channel. Captain Jeremy Brett was in command when with the Dutch Fleet in 1636. In 1637 Captain Lewis Kirke was in command followed by Captain Thomas Trenchfield. In 1639 Captain Thomas Price had the command followed by Captain Richard Swanley. In 1642 Captain Robert Fox had command but was dismissed (at the start of the English Civil War).

=== Service in the English Civil War ===
Later in 1642 she was with the Parliamentary Naval Force under the command of Captain Henry Bethell. In 1643 Captain Richard Blythe took command then Captain William Somaster in 1644 and finally Captain Phineas Pett during 1645 to 1647. Later in 1647 the Mary Rose was under Captain Thomas Harrison, sailing with Warwick's fleet in September 1648. In 1649 she was under Captain Francis Penrose.

== Disposition ==
Mary Rose was wrecked off the Flanders coast in March 1650 while under attack, possibly run ashore while under attack by two hostile ships.
