= English ship Hope (1559) =

History

England
- Name: Hope
- Builder: Deptford Dockyard
- Renamed: Assurance in 1604
- Fate: Sold 1645

General characteristics as built
- Class & type: Galleon
- Tons burthen: 403
- Length: 94 ft (29 m) (keel)
- Beam: 33 ft (10 m)
- Depth of hold: 13 ft (4.0 m)
- Armament: 30 guns

General characteristics after 1603-04 rebuild
- Class & type: 34-gun great ship
- Tons burthen: 451
- Length: 95 ft (29 m) (keel)
- Beam: 33 ft (10 m)
- Depth of hold: 14 ft 6 in (4.42 m)
- Sail plan: Full-rigged ship
- Complement: 250 (1633)
- Armament: 34 carriage guns of various weights of shot, plus 4 smaller weapons

Hope was a galleon of the English navy, built in 1559. She was rebuilt in 1583 "into the form of a galleass", and then again rebuilt from 1603 to 1604 when she was renamed Assurance. (Note: The "HMS" prefix was not used until the middle of the 18th century, but is sometimes applied retrospectively.)

Following her first rebuilding, she was mentioned in the Paris archives as part of Elizabeth I's fleet in 1588 in A Statement of the two fleets possessed by the Queen of England, with numbers and names of the ships, in which she was listed as "400 tons, 17 pieces each side, four pieces at the prow and the same at the stern." Her complement was 250 comprising 150 mariners, 30 gunners and 70 soldiers. The ship was under the command of Drake in 1588 - "Drake has also six large ships of the Queen's, namely :—the Revenge, the Hope, the Nonpareil, the Swiftsure, the Aid and the Advice, with 45 of the best merchant ships they could select, at the Isle of Wight." In October 1602 as part of Sir Robert Mansell's small fleet he intercepted and with the help of Dutch warships defeated six Spanish galleys in a battle in the Dover Straits.

In 1603-04 she was rebuilt a second time as a great ship (or second rank), and renamed Assurance. Now of 451 tons, she carried 34 primary guns (2 cannon periers, 10 culverins, 12 demi-culverins and 10 sakers) and 4 smaller and more anti-personnel weapons (fowlers).

She was sold out of the navy in late 1645.
