= English ship Prince Royal =

55-gun royal ship of the English Royal Navy

Coordinates: 51°43′59″N 1°56′36″E

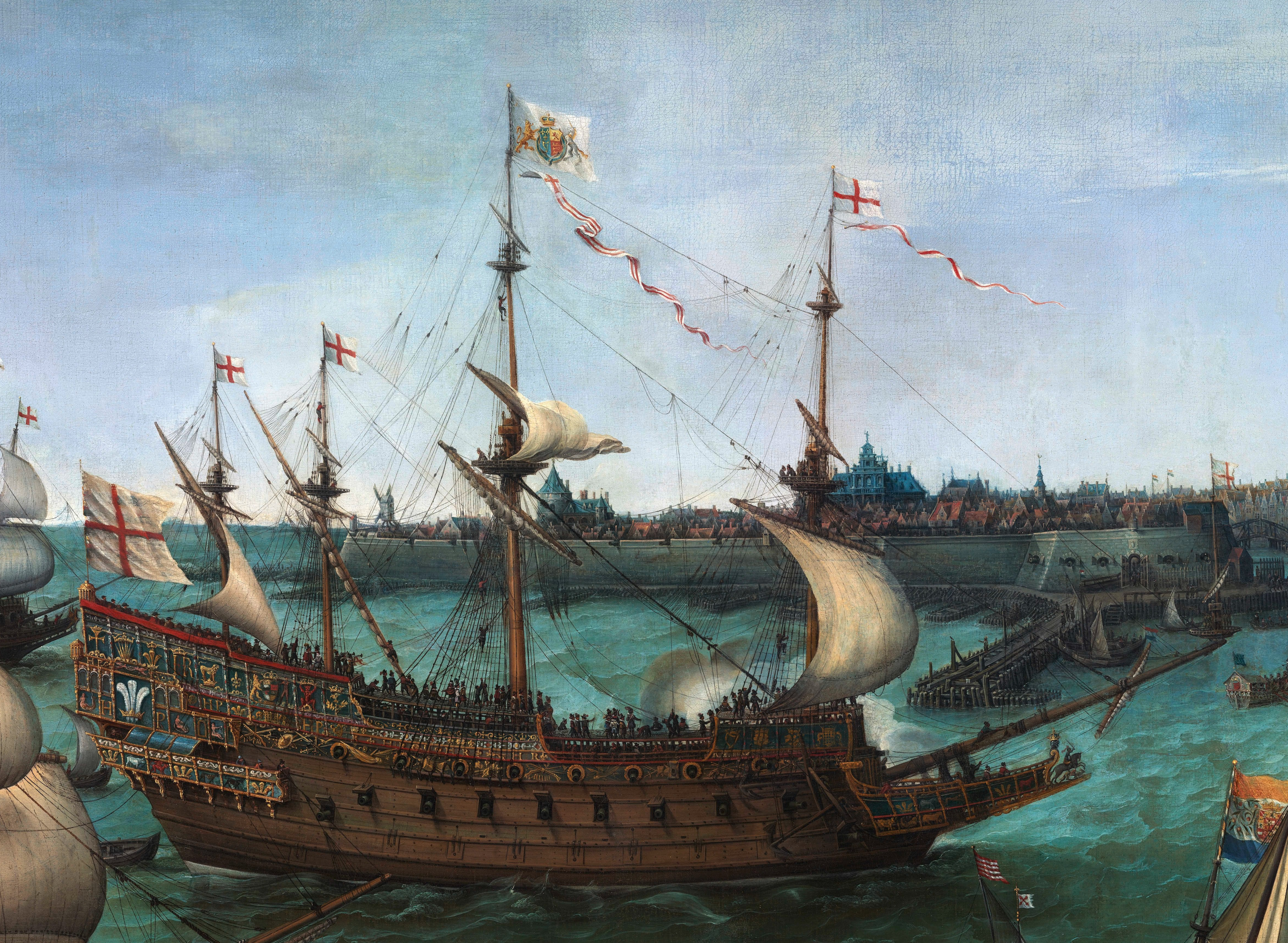
- Prince Royal arriving at Vlissingen in Holland in 1613. Detail of a painting from 1623 by the Dutch artist Hendrick Cornelisz Vroom.

History

England
- Name: Prince Royal
- Ordered: November 1607
- Builder: Phineas Pett I, Woolwich Dockyard
- Laid down: 20 October 1608
- Launched: 25 July 1610
- Fate: Burnt, 3 June 1666 by the Dutch
- Notes: Participated in: Battle of the Kentish Knock; Battle of the Gabbard; Battle of Scheveningen; Battle of Lowestoft; Four Days Battle

General characteristics as built
- Class & type: 55-gun royal ship
- Tons burthen: 1200 (nominal); actually 1,15746/94 bm
- Length: 115 ft (35 m) (keel)
- Beam: 43 ft 6 in (13.26 m)
- Depth of hold: 18 ft (5.5 m)
- Sail plan: Full-rigged ship
- Armament: 55 guns (in 1624) of various weights of shot including 51 carriage-mounted heavy guns and 4 light port-pieces (anti-personnel weapons)

General characteristics after 1641 rebuild
- Class & type: 70-gun ship
- Tons burthen: 1,18424/94 tons
- Length: 115 ft (35 m) (keel)
- Beam: 43 ft 6 in (13.26 m)
- Depth of hold: 18 ft (5.5 m)
- Sail plan: Full-rigged ship
- Armament: 70 guns of various weights of shot, increased to 88 in 1653 (wartime) then back to 80 in 1660 (peacetime)

General characteristics after 1663 rebuild
- Class & type: 92-gun first-rate ship of the line
- Tons burthen: 1,43234/94 tons
- Length: 132 ft (40 m) (keel)
- Beam: 45 ft 2 in (13.77 m)
- Depth of hold: 18 ft 10 in (5.74 m)
- Sail plan: Full-rigged ship
- Armament: 92 guns of various weights of shot

The Prince Royal was a 55-gun First rate warship of the navy of England. It was later rebuilt in 1639–41, and was renamed Resolution in 1649 under the Commonwealth of England. In 1660 at the Stuart Restoration she was renamed again as Royal Prince, and underwent a second rebuilding from 1661 to 1663. She was burnt in action on 3 June 1666 in the Four Days Battle during the Second Anglo-Dutch War.

== Design ==
The Prince Royal was built by Phineas Pett I at Woolwich and launched in 1610. It was at first intended as a reconstruction of the smaller Victory. The ship's fittings were carved by Sebastian Vicars, and painted and gilded by Robert Peake and Paul Isackson between Easter and Michaelmas 1611. Prince Henry took his cousin Frederick Ulrich, Duke of Brunswick-Lüneburg to see the ship being built. Princess Elizabeth sailed on The Prince Royal from Margate to Ostend in April 1613.

She was the first ship of the line with three complete gun decks, although when first completed the upper deck carried no guns in the waist, and was stepped down aft because of the large amount of sheer (the manner in which the decks rose towards the stern and bow). In 1621 a refit saw the removal of this step-down, with all three gun decks now being continuous.

== Service ==
From 1639 to 1641 the Prince Royal was rebuilt by Peter Pett at Woolwich as a 70-gun first-rate ship. During the time of the Commonwealth of England, she was named Resolution and fought in most battles of the First Anglo-Dutch War. By 1660 she was carrying 80 guns, and with the English Restoration of King Charles II she resumed the name Royal Prince. In 1663 she was rebuilt again at Woolwich Dockyard by Sir Phineas Pett II as a 92-gun first-rate ship of the line.

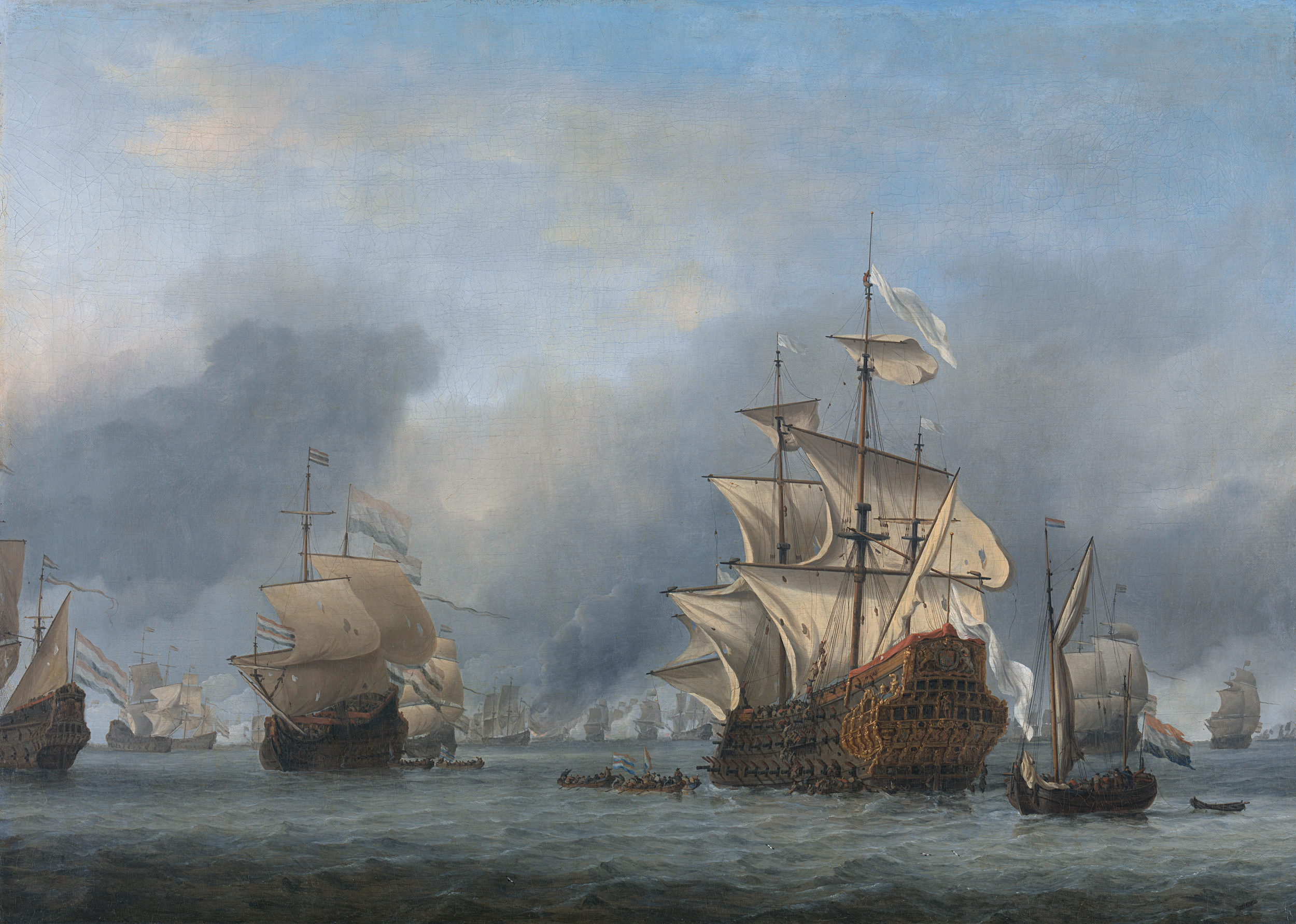
The surrender of Prince Royal at the Four Days Battle, 3 June 1666, by Willem van de Velde the Younger

In 1665, during the Second Anglo-Dutch War, she served as the flagship of Edward Montagu, 1st Earl of Sandwich at the Battle of Lowestoft on 3 June. A year later in 1666, she was Vice-Admiral George Ayscue's flagship in the Four Days Battle, on the third day of which (3 June by the Julian calendar then used in England) she ran aground on the Galloper Sand. When Dutch fireships surrounded the stranded ship, the crew panicked and Ayscue was forced to surrender to Lieutenant-Admiral Cornelis Tromp who was aboard the Gouda. The Dutch managed to free the ship from the shoal, but found her steering to be irreparably damaged. In accordance with standing orders issued by the States-General of the Netherlands, Lieutenant-Admiral Michiel de Ruyter ordered the Prince Royal to be burned, to prevent her recapture.

== See also ==
- HMS Victoria, the last three-decked ship of the line commissioned by the Royal Navy.
