= English ship Crow =

History

France
- Name: Le Crissant
- Captured: 4 September 1652
- Fate: Taken by Blake's Fleet off Dunkirk

History

Commonwealth of England
- Name: Crow
- Acquired: 9 September 1652
- Commissioned: 1653
- Fate: Sold 1656

General characteristics
- Class & type: 36-gun fourth rate
- Sail plan: ship-rigged
- Complement: 140
- Armament: 36 guns

Crow was a 36-gun fourth rate vessel captured from the French by the English, She was captured on 9 September 1652 as the 36-gun Le Croissant. She was commissioned into the Parliamentary Naval Force as Crow. She was sold 1656.

Crow was the only named vessel in the English or Royal Navy.

== Specifications ==
Her dimensional data is unknown. Her gun armament was 36 guns. Her manning was 140 personnel.

== Commissioned service ==
=== Service in the English Civil War and Commonwealth Navy ===
She was commissioned into the Parliamentary Navy in 1653 under the command of Captain Thomas Thompson until 1654. She was placed in ordinary in 1654,

== Disposition ==
Crow was sold 1656.
