= Robert Mansell =

Royal Navy officer and politician (1573–1656)

Vice-Admiral Sir Robert Mansell
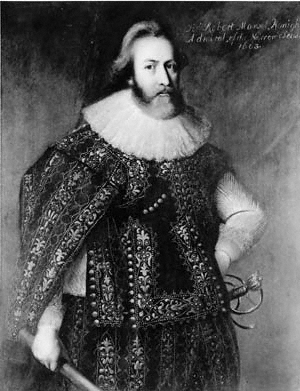
- Sir Robert Mansell by unknown artist
- Born: 1573; Margam, Glamorganshire, Wales
- Died: 1656
- Military career
- Allegiance: England
- Branch: Royal Navy
- Service years: 1573–1656
- Rank: Vice-Admiral
- Conflicts: Anglo-Spanish War: Capture of Cádiz; Islands Voyage; Battle of the Narrow Seas

Vice-Admiral Sir Robert Mansell (1573–1656) was a Royal Navy officer and politician who served in the Anglo-Spanish War.

== Early life ==
Mansel was a Welshman, the son of Sir Edward Mansel of Penrice and Margam (died 1585), although he later established himself among the gentry of Norfolk. His early naval career is not recorded, but he served in the 1596 capture of Cádiz under Robert Devereux, Earl of Essex, commanding Vanguard, and was knighted for his part in it. He subsequently took part in Essex's Islands Voyage to the Azores (1597), then held commands off the Irish coast during Essex's campaign in Ireland. In October 1602 he was fitted out with a fleet and with the Dutch helped defeat six Spanish galleys under Federico Spinola at the Battle of the Narrow Seas. As a result, Mansell was named Vice-Admiral of the Narrow seas in 1603 and became Treasurer of the Navy in 1604. Mansel was made Treasurer of the Navy by the Earl of Nottingham, displacing Fulke Greville.

== Duel ==
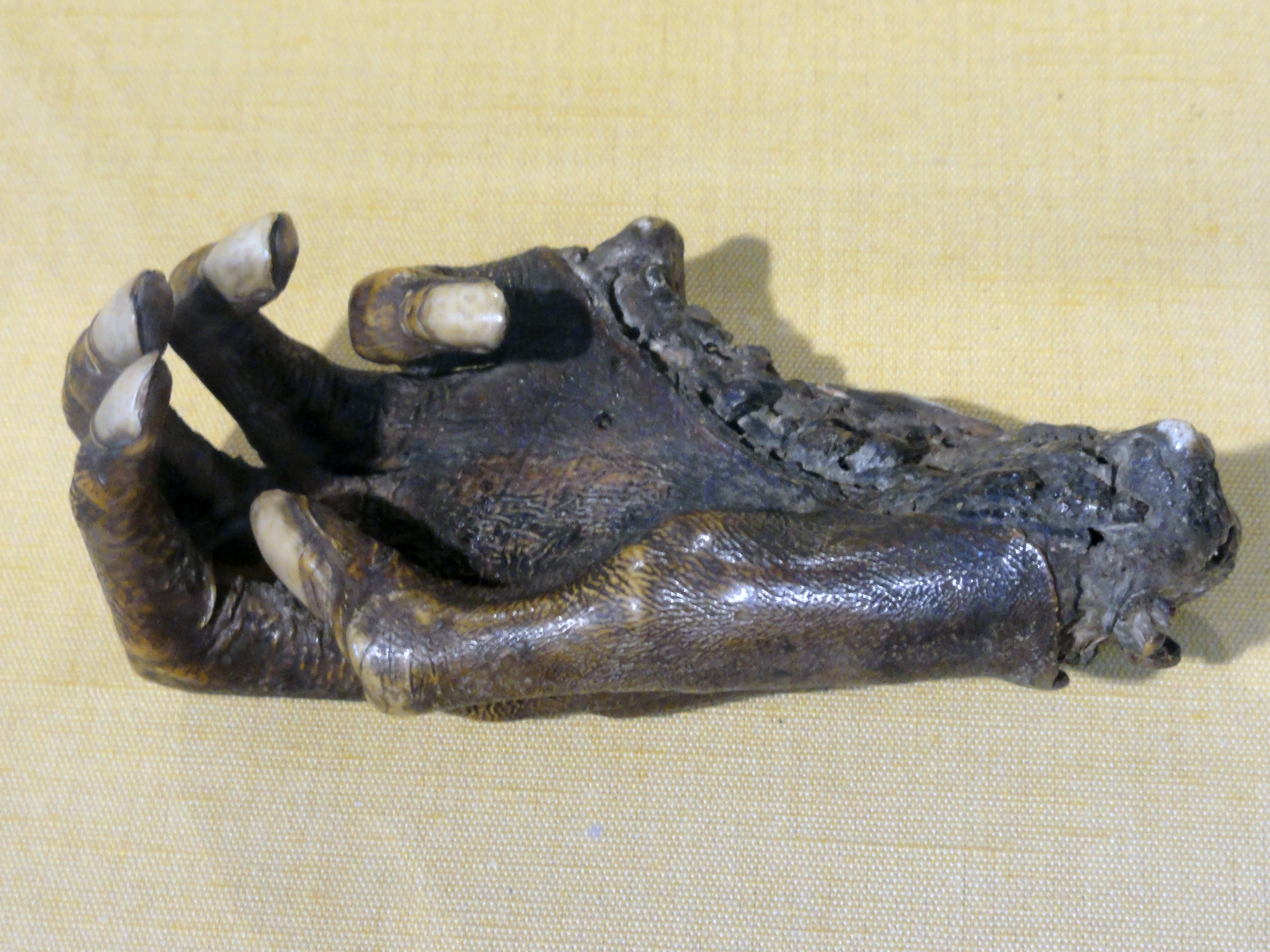
Hand of Sir John Heydon (1588 – 1653), cut off in a duel with Sir Robert Mansel in January 1600. Norwich Castle Museum.

In October 1600, Sir Robert's quarrel with a Norfolk neighbour, Sir John Heydon, ended in a notorious duel. Heydon's brother, Sir Christopher Heydon, was already noted for such affairs and in fact was at that moment detained in London by the Privy Council to prevent him duelling with Sir John Townshend. The Council seem to have got wind of the dispute between Mansell and Heydon, and the Lord Chief Justice wrote to Sir Robert Cecil, urging him to forestall it since the county was "already too much wrought into faction". But he was too late, and the fight took place outside Norwich: Heydon was badly wounded, and lost a hand (which is now, in a mummified state, on display in Norwich Castle Museum). Both Heydons were followers of Robert Devereux, Earl of Essex, and took part in his rebellion in the following year. Mansell remained loyal to the Queen, and took an active part in arresting those implicated as accomplices.

== Political and business career ==
In 1601, Mansel stood for Parliament as a candidate for Norfolk, the election having been delayed by the Essex Rebellion. He was defeated, perhaps because of disapproval of his duel, but was however elected as MP for King's Lynn at the same election. He later served as member for Carmarthenshire (1604–14), Glamorgan (1624–1625 and 1628) and Lostwithiel (1626). He accompanied the Earl of Nottingham on his mission to Spain in 1605. Like several Jacobean courtiers and officials, Mansell received gifts of money from Spanish diplomats between 1604 and 1625.

In January 1606 he and his nephew, Lewis Mansell, were two of the nobles who performed for the court in 'Hymenaei', a masque and a tournament at the "Barriers", an entertainment written by Ben Jonson for the marriage of Robert Devereux, 3rd Earl of Essex, and Lady Frances Howard. In August 1606 he escorted Christian IV back to Denmark with the Vanguard and the Moon.

In 1609, his name appears on the Second Charter of Virginia dated 23 May 1609. As investor (London Company) and on the council. As treasurer of the navy Robert Mansell was granted funds for "the naval fight to be had upon the river of Thames, for the more magnificent and royal solemnizing of the marriage of the Lady Elizabeth" in February 1613. The show was partly the work of the naval architect Phineas Pett.

In 1613, he was accused of political disaffection and imprisoned in the Marshalsea Prison, but was soon released and seems not to have remained in disfavour for long since he not only retained his offices but in 1615 obtained a monopoly on the manufacture of glass. He established glass factories in various places, including the first at Newcastle, pioneering the use of sea coal rather than wood in the manufacturing process, and there are records of his later defence of his patents in parliamentary debates. He also acquired the Vauxhall glassworks in Lambeth and glass factories in Woolwich, where he also managed the dockyard and the ropeyard, close to his home in East-Greenwich. In 1618, James Howell wrote that Mansel had "melted vast sums of money in the glass business, a business indeed more proper for a merchant, than a courtier".

In 1618, Mansel was appointed Vice-Admiral of England in 1618, and ceased to be Treasurer of the Navy. Contemporary papers suggest this was not in fact intended as a promotion, and that he was deliberately moved to a less influential position because of suspicions of his dishonest administration as treasurer. Nevertheless, he apparently retained royal favour, even after the failure of the expedition he led against the pirates of Algiers in 1621. In 1620, his name appears on the Charter of New England 3 November 1620. As investor (Plymouth Company) and on the council. In October 1620, he led a force of the King's warships to the Barbary coast in an effort to find English slaves taken from the shores of the South West.

== Personal life ==
Sir Robert married twice: first to Elizabeth Bacon, daughter of Sir Nicholas Bacon, the Lord Keeper of the Great Seal; and secondly, in 1617, to Elizabeth Roper (d. 1658), daughter of Sir John Roper. He had no children. He died in 1656.

== Honors ==
In 1613, Mansel Island in Nunavut, Canada was named in his honor by Sir Thomas Button.

== Sources ==
- Concise Dictionary of National Biography (1930)
- J. E. Neale, The Elizabethan House of Commons (London: Jonathan Cape, 1949)
- Robert Mansel, Dictionary of Welsh Biography
- Cobbett's Parliamentary history of England, from the Norman Conquest in 1066 to the year 1803 (London: Thomas Hansard, 1808)
- Second charter of Virginia - Yale Law School
- Charter of New England - Yale Law School

Political offices
Preceded by Fulke Greville	Treasurer of the Navy; 1604–1618	Succeeded by Sir William Russell
