= Peter Pett (shipwright, died 1589) =

English master-shipwright at Deptford

- Died: 1589
- Occupation: Shipwright
- Spouse(s): Unknown (m.); Elizabeth Thornton (m.)
- Children: Phineas Pett

Peter Pett (died 1589) was an English master-shipwright at Deptford.

== Life ==
Peter Pett is described as the great-grandson of Thomas Pett of Skipton in Cumberland. But Skipton is in Yorkshire, and, though some of his kin may have settled in the north, it is more probable that he belonged to the family of the name which early in the fifteenth century owned property at Pett in the parish of Stockbury in Kent. Heywood stated in 1637 that for two hundred years and upwards men of the name had been officers and architects in the Royal Navy. It appears well established that Pett's father, also Peter, was settled at Harwich, probably as a shipbuilder. Pett himself was certainly in the service of the Crown from an early age; he was already master-shipwright at Deptford in the reign of Edward VI, and there he continued till his death on or about 6 September 1589. During this time he had a principal part in building most of the ships of the navy, though the details are wanting. Richard Chapman, who built the Ark, was brought up by Pett, and so also, in all probability, was Matthew Baker, with whom, from 1570, Pett was associated in the works at Dover. In 1587 he and Baker accused Sir John Hawkyns, then Treasurer of the Navy, of malpractices in connection with the repair of the Queen's ships. The charges were apparently held to be the outcome of pique or jealousy. Hawkyns was annoyed, but suffered no material injury, and Pett remained in his office. In 1583 he was granted arms, or, on a fess gules between three ogresses, a lion passant of the field; and the crest, out of a ducal coronet, a demi-pelican with wings expanded. He was twice married. By his first wife he had at least two sons: Joseph, who succeeded him at Deptford as master-shipwright, and died on 15 November 1605; and Peter, who carried on business as a shipbuilder at Wapping. By his second wife, Elizabeth Thornton, sister of Captain Thornton of the Navy, he had also two sons – Phineas, and Noah, who in 1594 was master of the Popinjay with his uncle Thornton – and four daughters, one of whom, Abigail, was cruelly beaten to death with a pair of tongs by her stepfather, Thomas Nunn, in 1599. Nunn, who was a clergyman, received the Queen's pardon for his crime, but died immediately afterwards.

== Sources ==
- Calendars of State Papers, Domestic;
- Defeat of the Spanish Armada (Navy Records Society);
- Autobiography of Phineas Pett (Harl. MS. 6279).

== See also ==
- Pett dynasty

== Bibliography ==
- Laughton, John Knox (1896). "Pett, Peter (d.1589)" . In Lee, Sidney (ed.). Dictionary of National Biography. Vol. 45. London: Smith, Elder & Co. pp. 102–103.
