= Lord Henry Seymour (naval commander) =

Vice-Admiral Lord Henry Seymour
- Born: 1540; Berry Pomeroy, Devonshire, England
- Died: 1588 (aged 47–48); England
- Military career
- Allegiance: England
- Branch: Royal Navy
- Rank: Vice-Admiral
- Commands: Admiral of the Narrow Seas
- Conflicts: Spanish Armada

Vice-Admiral Lord Henry Seymour (1540–1588) was an English naval commander and Admiral of the Narrow Seas during the Elizabethan Age.

The younger son of Edward Seymour, 1st Duke of Somerset by his second wife Anne Stanhope, he married Lady Joan (or Jane) Percy, daughter of Thomas Percy, 7th Earl of Northumberland.

In 1588, he was appointed Admiral of the Narrow Seas and took command of Rainbow and the Squadron of ships that took part in the Battle of Gravelines against the Spanish Armada in 1588. Controlling the seas off Dunkirk they joined the main British fleet (the 'Western Squadron') near Calais on 6 August, adding about a third to the total size.
