= First-rate =

Historic category for Royal Navy ships

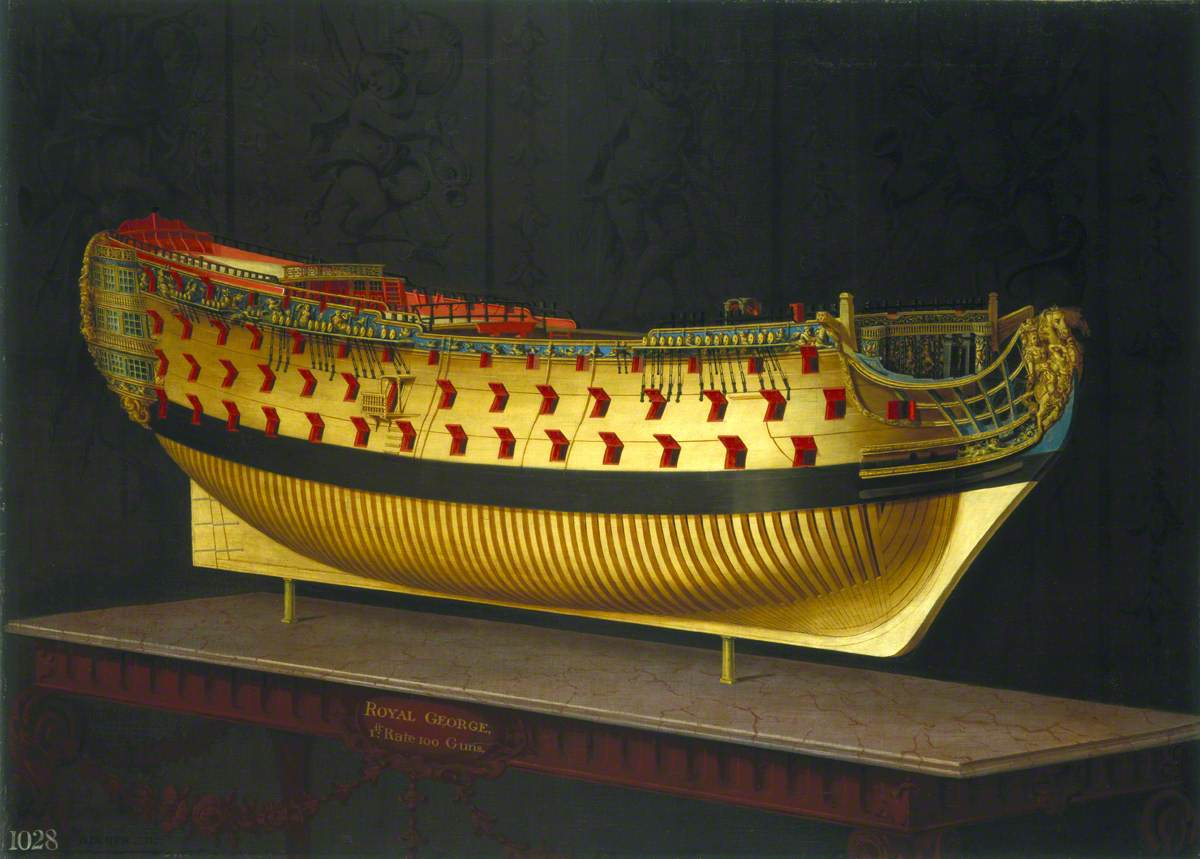
Painting of a model of the first-rate HMS Royal George

In the rating system of the Royal Navy used to categorise sailing warships, first-rate was the designation for the largest ships of the line. Originating in the Jacobean era with the designation of Ships Royal capable of carrying at least 400 men, the size and establishment of first-rates evolved over the following 250 years to eventually denote ships of the line carrying at least 80 guns across three gundecks. By the end of the eighteenth century, a first-rate carried no fewer than 100 guns and more than 850 crew, and had a measurement (burthen) tonnage of some 2,000 tons.

== Rating ==
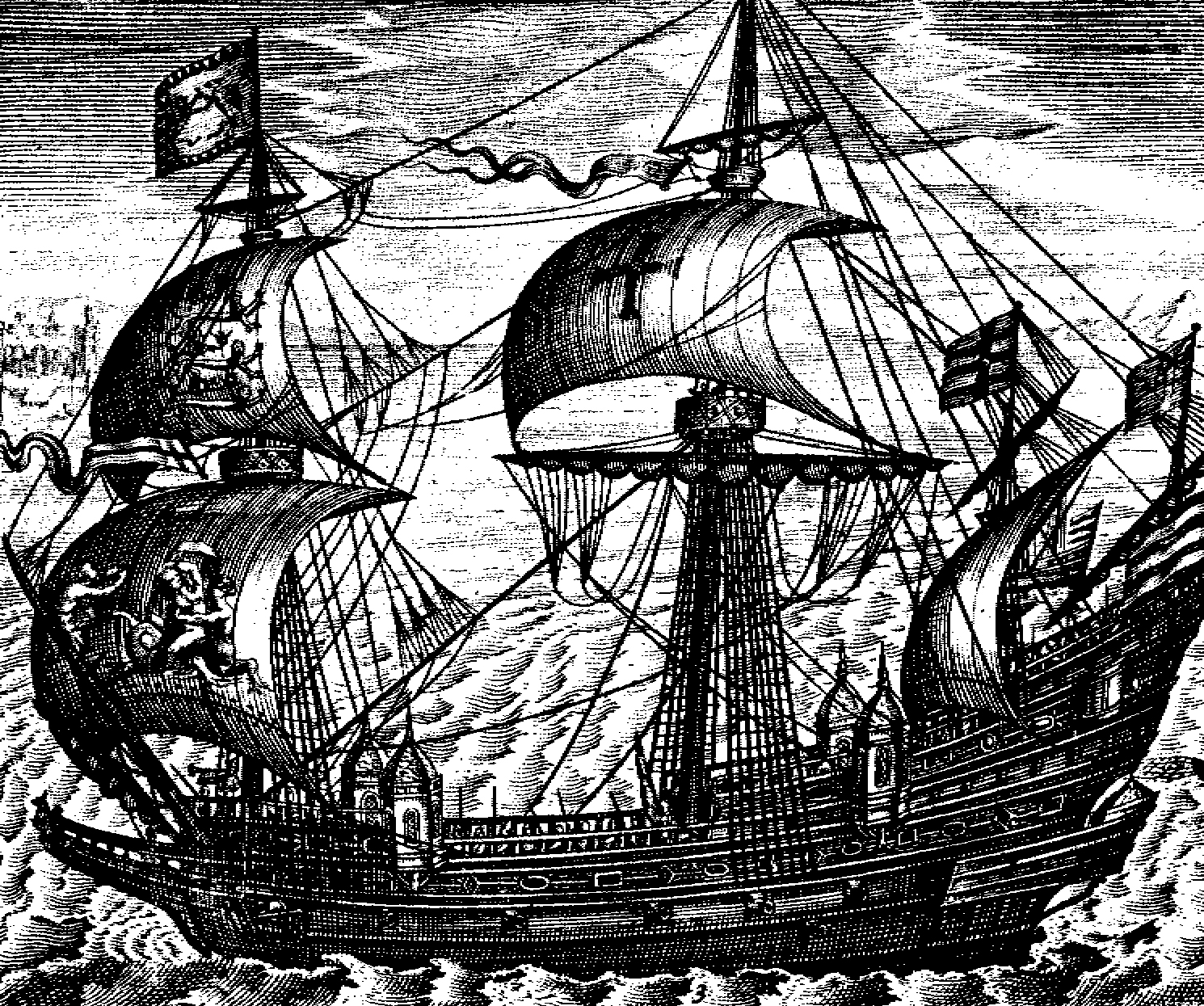
1587 engraving of the Ship Royal Ark Royal

The concept of a rating system for British naval vessels dates to the accession of James I of England at the turn of the 17th century, following which the fleet was formally divided into "great", "middling" and "lesser" craft. A 1618 commission of enquiry added a further designation of "Ships Royal" for the largest and most prestigious vessels in the fleet, each capable of carrying at least 400 men. The first Ships Royal – Elizabeth Jonas, Triumph, White Bear, Merhonour, Ark Royal and Victory – were all converted galleons and included three very old vessels that had fought against the Spanish Armada in 1588. Their condition was generally poor, with Elizabeth Jonas and Triumph already completely unserviceable and White Bear so unseaworthy that she was sold for scrap in 1627.

The Navy's rating system was later modified to differentiate ships considered suitable for various functions within the naval tactics of the Age of Sail. Lower numbers indicated larger and more capable ships. By the mid-18th century ships suitable for the line of battle were first-rate ships carrying at least 100 guns, second-rate ships carrying 84 to 98 guns, and larger third-rate ships carrying 70 to 80 guns. Smaller third-rate ships carrying about 60–64 guns, and fourth-rate ships of around 50 guns, had earlier been considered suitable, but were being phased out. Fifth-rate and sixth-rate ships were frigates usually maneuvering independently of the line of battle.

== Origins ==
Early first-rates had as few as 60 guns, but by the mid-1660s they generally carried between 90 and 100 guns. By the early years of the 18th century, it had become accepted that 100 guns was the standard criterion for a first-rate in wartime (while 90 guns, later 98 guns, became the standard wartime ordnance for a second rate). (In peacetime, all ships of the line carried a reduced complement of guns.) Towards the close of the century, ships were built with more than 100 guns, and they too were classed as first-rates. In addition to the rated number of carriage-mounted guns (which included the heaviest calibre available mounted on their lower decks, with smaller guns on the decks above), first-rates also carried a number of anti-personnel guns, initially swivel-mounted weapons. From the invention of the slide-mounted carronade in the later 1770s, first-rates (like other warships), could mount a number of these weapons on their quarterdecks and forecastles to augment their short-range firepower, but they were not included in the ship's rating until 1817 except where they replaced carriage-mounted guns.

Although very powerful, the Navy's first-rates were of limited utility at sea. For stability their lowest gundeck had to be very close to the waterline and its gunports could not be opened in anything but the calmest of seas. To do otherwise was to risk swamping the entire vessel, as occurred in 1782 when the first-rate Royal George sank at anchor at Spithead after the lower gunports were opened to air the ship. Early first-rates had little storage space to stow provisions for their large crews on long voyages, and the ships themselves routinely proved unseaworthy in winter weather; as a consequence the first-rates were restricted to summer cruising, and then only in the English Channel and nearby waters. By the mid-1700s, however, improved design had removed these limitations.

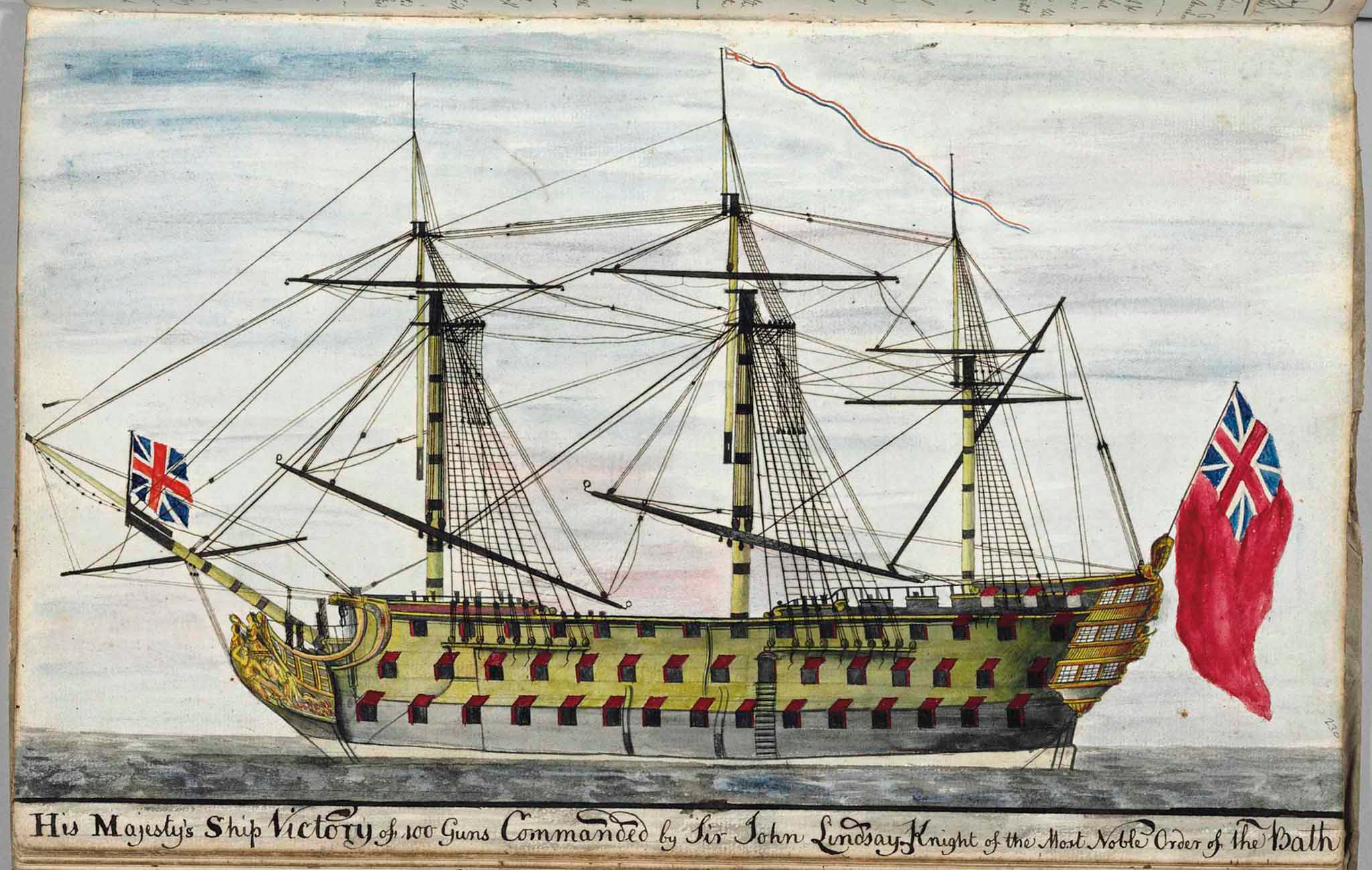
1778 illustration of the first-rate HMS Victory

Ships of this size were extremely expensive to operate. As a result, the few first-rates (the Royal Navy had only five completed in 1794) were typically reserved as commanding admirals' flagships. First-rates were typically kept out of commission ("in Ordinary") during peacetime and only activated ("commissioned") during times of conflict. This had the added advantage of preserving them from the wear and tear that smaller ships experienced in spending long periods at sea. Spending time in Ordinary could considerably extend a first-rate's lifespan; for instance, by the time she fought in the Battle of Trafalgar, HMS Victory had been in service for 40 years, although a portion of this time was spent in Ordinary. With first-rates being the most powerful ships of the navy, it was common to compare them with the navies of other nations; frequently one sees the largest ships of those navies being referred to as first-rates. Other nations had their own rating systems, notably the French Navy with its system of five formal rates or rangs.

== Ships ==
Due to their cost of construction and maintenance, only a small number of first-rates could be built and maintained at any one time. Thus over the 250 years (approximately) that the rating system of the Royal Navy was used, only a relatively small number of these ships saw service.

Only one first-rate has survived to the present. HMS Victory, Admiral Nelson's flagship at the Battle of Trafalgar, is preserved at HMNB Portsmouth and is in commission. The hull of the 102-gun HMS St Lawrence, which was built and operated entirely in fresh water during the War of 1812, survives intact in shallow water near shore in Kingston, Ontario, and is a popular diving attraction. Two other noted first-rates were HMS Royal Sovereign, which was broken up in 1841, and HMS Britannia, which was broken up in 1825. Both these ships had 100 guns. Later first-rates such as HMS Caledonia and its several sisters had 120 guns. Other navies, notably those of France and Spain, also had similar ships with more than 100 guns, the most heavily armed being the Santísima Trinidad which, following a rebuilding in 1802, carried 140 guns.

== Other usage ==
The Royal Navy's use of the term "first-rate" to describe its largest and most powerful vessels is the origin of the modern English-language meaning of "exceptionally good" or "of the highest quality."

== Bibliography ==
- Bennett, G. (2004). The Battle of Trafalgar. Seaforth. ISBN 1-84415-107-7.
- Gardiner, Robert, ed. (1992). The Line of Battle: The Sailing Warship, 1650–1840. Conway's History of the Ship. Naval Institute Press. ISBN 1-55750-501-2.
- Keegan, John (1989). The Price of Admiralty. Viking. ISBN 0670814164.
- Winfield, Rif (2009). British Warships in the Age of Sail 1603–1714: Design, Construction, Careers and Fates. Seaforth. ISBN 978-1-84832-040-6.
- Winfield, Rif (2007). British Warships in the Age of Sail 1714–1792: Design, Construction, Careers and Fates. Seaforth Publishing. ISBN 978-1-84415-700-6.
- Winfield, Rif (2008). British Warships in the Age of Sail 1793–1817: Design, Construction, Careers and Fates (2nd, revised ed.). Seaforth. ISBN 978-1-84415-717-4.
- Winfield, Rif (2014). British Warships in the Age of Sail 1817–1863: Design, Construction, Careers and Fates. Seaforth Publishing. ISBN 978-1-84832-169-4.
- Winfield, Rif (2010). First Rate: The Greatest Warships of the Age of Sail. Naval Institute Press. ISBN 978-1-59114-264-5.
