= English ship Swiftsure (1573) =

History

England
- Name: Swiftsure
- Builder: Peter Pett, at Deptford Dockyard
- Launched: 1573
- Renamed: Speedwell
- Fate: Lost, 1624

General characteristics as built
- Class & type: Galleon
- Tons burthen: 350
- Complement: 200
- Armament: 29 major guns, plus 4 fowlers

General characteristics after 1607 rebuild
- Class & type: Middling ship
- Tons burthen: 333
- Length: 74 ft (23 m) (keel)
- Beam: 30 ft (9.1 m)
- Depth of hold: 15 ft (4.6 m)
- Sail plan: Full-rigged ship

Swiftsure (Note: The 'HMS' prefix was not used until the middle of the 18th century, but is sometimes applied retrospectively) was a galleon of the English Navy, launched in 1573. She was rebuilt in 1592.

In 1607 she was renamed Speedwell, when she was rebuilt for a second time at Deptford, now classed as a middling ship. She was wrecked near Vlissingen on 1 November 1624.
