= English ship Merhonour =

History

England
- Name: Merhonour
- Builder: Woolwich Dockyard
- Launched: 1590
- Reinstated: 1615 after rebuilding
- Fate: Sold, 1650

General characteristics as built
- Tons burthen: 692 bm
- Length: 100 ft (30 m) (keel)
- Beam: 37 ft (11 m)
- Depth of hold: 17 ft (5.2 m)
- Complement: 400 (by 1603)
- Armament: 39 guns: 4 × demi-cannon; 15 × culverins; 16 × demi-culverins; 4 × sakers; 2 × smaller guns

General characteristics after 1615 rebuild (Note: Lavery's details are challenged by both Colledge, and Winfield. Both describe a 1590 build date at Woolwich, while Winfield describes in detail the armament and dimensions both as launched and after the 1615 rebuild.)
- Class & type: 40-gun royal ship
- Tons burthen: 709/946 nominal; later 88682/94 bm
- Length: 112 ft (34 m) (keel)
- Beam: 38 ft 7 in (11.76 m)
- Depth of hold: 16 ft 5 in (5.00 m)
- Sail plan: Full-rigged ship
- Complement: 400
- Armament: 40 guns; 2 × cannon periers; 6 × demi-cannon; 12 × culverins; 12 × demi-culverins; 8 × sakers; 4 × smaller guns

The Merhonour (Note: The 'HMS' prefix was not used until after the middle of the eighteenth century, but is sometimes applied retrospectively back to 1660, the year in which the English Royal Navy was created.) was a ship of the Tudor navy of England. It was built in 1590 by Mathew Baker at Woolwich Dockyard, and was rebuilt by Phineas Pett I at Woolwich between 1612 and 1615, being re-launched on 6 March 1615 as a 40-gun Royal Ship (or First rate). She was then laid up at Chatham, only briefly returning to service from 1635 to 1636 before being laid up again at Chatham. She was nevertheless considered at that time to be one of the fastest ships in the Navy. In 1638 she was considered to be cut down by a deck and rebuilt with "two decks and a half", but instead she remained laid up.

The Merhonour was sold out of the navy in 1650 by the Commonwealth of England.
