= English ship Repulse (1596) =

English warship, built 1596

History

England
- Name: Repulse
- Builder: Deptford Dockyard
- Launched: c.1 March 1596
- Fate: Broken up, 1649

General characteristics as built
- Class & type: 40-48 gun ship
- Tons burthen: 622
- Length: 105 ft (32 m) (keel)
- Beam: 37 ft (11 m)
- Depth of hold: 16 ft (4.9 m)
- Sail plan: Full-rigged ship
- Armament: 38 principal guns, plus 4 smaller anti-personnel guns

General characteristics after 1610 rebuild
- Class & type: 40-gun Great ship
- Tons burthen: 657
- Length: 108 ft (33 m) (keel)
- Beam: 37 ft (11 m)
- Depth of hold: 16 ft (4.9 m)
- Sail plan: Full-rigged ship
- Armament: 34 principal guns, plus 6 smaller anti-personnel guns

Repulse, (Note: The 'HMS' prefix was not used until the middle of the 18th century, but is sometimes applied retrospectively) sometimes written as Due Repulse, was a 40/48-gun ship of the English Tudor navy, launched in 1596.

Repulse was rebuilt in 1610 as a great ship of 34 principal guns, plus 6 smaller anti-personnel guns.

In 1613 The Repulse was appointed to escort Princess Elizabeth, daughter of James VI and I, and Frederick V of the Palatinate sailing in The Prince Royal from Margate to Ostend.

She was broken up in 1649.
