= Phineas Pett =

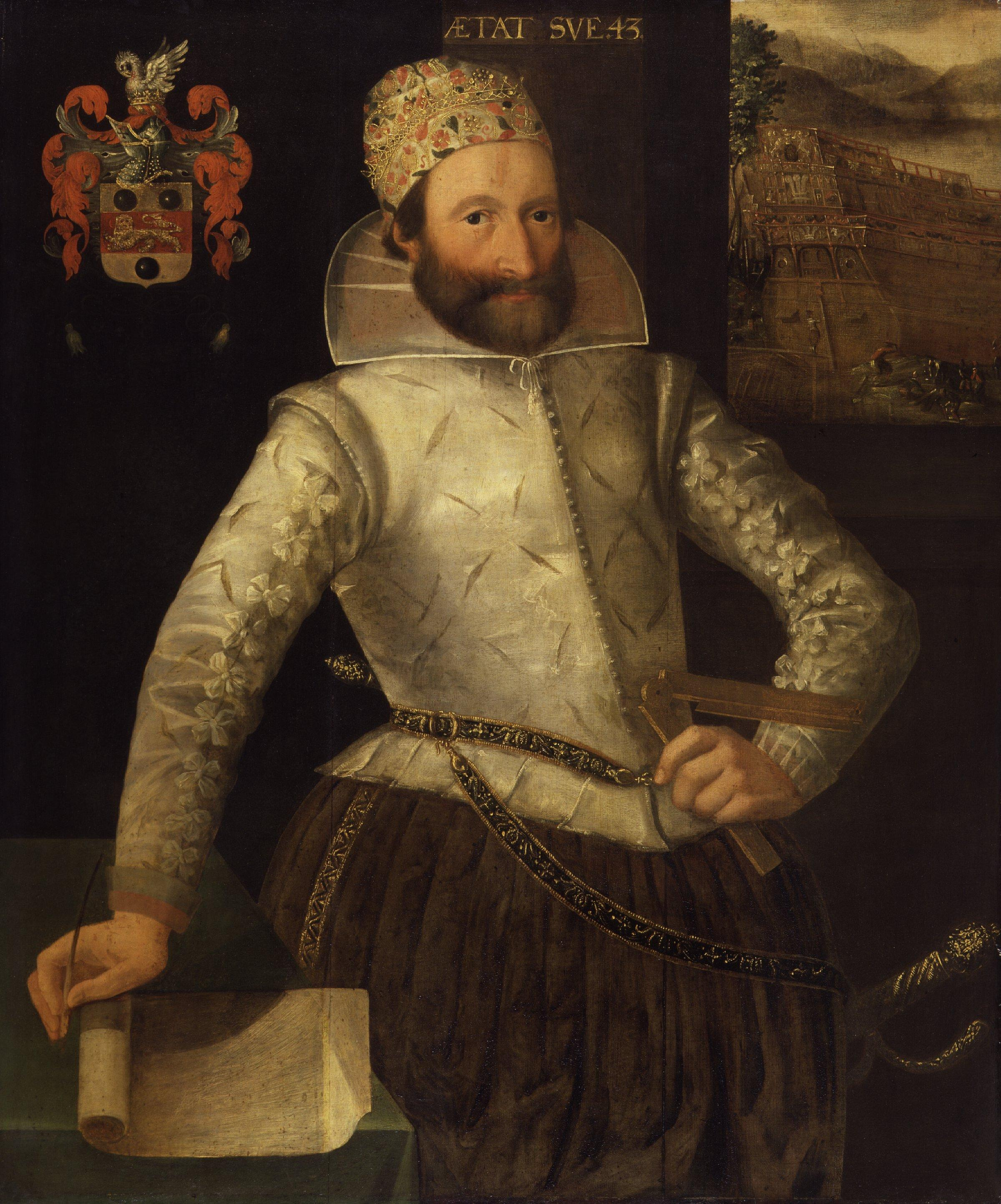
Phineas Pett

Phineas Pett (1 November 1570 – August 1647) was a shipwright and First Resident Commissioner of Chatham Dockyard and a member of the Pett dynasty. Phineas left a memoir of his activities which is preserved in the British Library and was published in 1918.

== Family background ==
Born at "Deptford Strond", he was the second son of Peter Pett of Deptford, his elder brother being named Joseph.

== Life ==
Pett made a miniature ship for the Prince at Chatham. The keel was 28 feet and the breadth 12 feet, and was finished "battlement-wise" like the Ark Royal. On 22 March Pett presented the ship to Prince Henry, who named it the Disdain and "entertained it with great joy, being purposely made to disport himself withal.". On 26 April 1604, James I of England gave Phineas, described as a servant of Prince Henry, a grant of a shilling a day. The grant also mentions Phineas's elder brother, Joseph. Phineas and Joseph were named in the royal charter for the incorporation of masters and wardens of the "Art and Mystery of Shipbuilding in England" in April 1605.

The model was set up in a private room off the Long Gallery, in an arched frame curtained with crimson taffeta.

In February 1613 Pett worked with Robert Mansell to organise lavish fireworks and sea-fight or naumachia on the Thames to celebrate wedding of Princess Elizabeth and Frederick V of the Palatinate. Pett himself was captain of a Venetian argosy, which he had converted from an old pinnace called The Spy. Pett wrote that he was in more danger in this "jesting business" than if had been on active sea-service in earnest.

From sometime around 27 March 1616, Pett expected to profit from a commission by Sir Walter Raleigh to build him a vessel of 500 tons for £500. Admiral Howard permitted Pett to lay her keel on the galley dock at Woolwich, with the consent of King James.

In 1630, he was appointed a commissioner of the King for making "a general survey of the whole navy at Chatham." For this and other works Pett was promoted by Charles to be a principal officer of the Navy, receiving £200 per annum. His patent was sealed on 16 January 1631. In the same year the King, Charles I of England, visited Woolwich to view the launch of the Vanguard, which Pett had built. The king honoured Phineas by participating in a banquet at his lodgings..

In June 1634 Phineas made a model ship on wheels for the four-year-old Prince Charles, for use in the long gallery at St James's Palace.

Phineas lived for ten years after the Sovereign of the Seas was launched. In the burial register of the parish of Chatham it is recorded, "Phineas Pett, Esqe. and Capt., was buried 21 August 1647."

== See also ==
- English ship Merhonour (1590)
- Ship naming and launching

== Sources ==
- Smiles, Samuel (1884). Men of Invention and Industry. London: William Clowes and Sons.
- Perrin, William Gordon (1918). The autobiography of Phineas Pett. Naval Records Society.
