= English ship Adventure (1594) =

English naval vessel

History

English Navy Royal
- Name: Adventure
- Builder: Deptford Dockyard
- Launched: 1594
- Commissioned: 1595
- Fate: Broken in 1645

General characteristics
- Class & type: Galley; Fourth Rate - 1626
- Tons burthen: 174.6/343.2 tons bm
- Length: 88 ft 0 in (26.8 m) keel
- Beam: 26 ft 0 in (7.9 m)
- Depth of hold: 12 ft 0 in (3.7 m)
- Propulsion: Sail
- Sail plan: ship-rigged
- Complement: 120 (1603)
- Armament: in 1603; 4 x culverins; 11 × demi-culverins; 5 × sakers; in 1624; 12 × demi-culverins; 6 × sakers; 4 × minions

Adventure was a 26-gun galley in the service of the English Navy Royal. She spent her early career in expeditions as far as West Indies, Cadiz and the Azores. She later was assigned to the Channel Guard during two more attempts by Philip II of Spain to invade England. She would spend the rest of her time in Home Waters, mainly the English Channel and North Sea. She was broken in 1645.

Adventure was the first named vessel in the English and Royal Navies.

== Construction and specifications ==
She was built on the Thames at Deptford Dockyard under the guidance of Master Shipwright Matthew Baker. She was launched in 1594. Her dimensions were 88 feet 0 inches (26.8 metres) for keel with a breadth of 26 feet 0 inches (7.9 metres) and a depth of hold of 12 feet 0 inches (3.7 metres). Her tonnage was between 274.6 and 343.2 tons.

Her gun armament was in 1603 18 guns consisting of four culverins, (Note: The culverin was a gun of 4,500 pounds with a 5.5 inch bore firing a 17.5 pound shot with a twelve pound powder charge.) eleven demi-culverines, (Note: The demi-culverin was a gun of 3,400 pounds with a four inch bore firing a 9.5 pound shot with an eight pound powder charge.) five sakers (Note: The sacar or saker was a gun of 1,400 pounds with a 3.5 inch bore firing a 5.5 pound shot with an 5.5 pound powder charge.) plus two fowlers. (Note: The fowler was an anti-personnel breech-loading gun that fired either stone or grape shot. the weapon weighed about 5 cwt and the breech weighed another 1 cwt.) In 1624 her armament was listed as twelve demi-culverines, six sakers, six minions (Note: The minion was a gun of 1,000 pounds with a 3.5 inch bore firing a 4 pound shot with an 4 pound powder charge.) plus four fowlers. Her manning was around 120 officers and men in 1603.

== Commissioned service ==
She was commissioned in 1595 under Captain Thomas Drake, followed by Captain Henry Savile for service with Sir Francis Drake and Sir John Hawkyns expedition to the West Indies. Both Hawkins and Drake would be killed there. In 1597 she was under Captain Sir George Carew for an expedition to the Azores. In 1599 under Captain George Somers on the Irish Station. Captain Sir Alexander Clifford was her commander with the Channel Guard in 1599. In 1602 she was under Captain Sackville Trevor with Sir Richard Leveson's Squadron in an attack on Cezimbra on 3 June 1602. Later in 1602 she was under Captain Thomas Norreys with Sir William Monson's squadron. During 1611-1612 she was under command of Captain Sir William Monson for service in the English Channel.

She was in commission in the summer of 1623 under the command of Captain Richard Bingley. The next time she was incommission was 1626 under the command of Captain George Alleyne. She was off the Dutch coast at the capture of Saint Esprit in October 1627. She was repaired at Deptford between December 1627 and 1628. In November 1628 Captain John Mennes was in command, She was again in commission under Captain Richard Paramore (took command on 30 March 1635) sailing with Lindsey's Fleet in the Channel. Ayear later on 30 March 1636 she was under command of Captain Thomas Price sailing with Northumberland's Fleet in the Channel. Her last commander was Captain J. Hall in 1638. In November 1638 she was reported to be old, leaky and rotten. She was laid up at Chatham.

== Disposition ==
Adventure was broken by Admiralty Ordered (AO) 2 November 1645.
