= English ship Defiance (1590) =

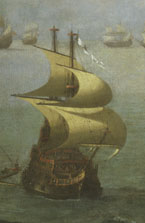
- Defiance

History

England
- Name: Defiance
- Launched: 1590
- Fate: Sold, 1650

General characteristics as built
- Class & type: 46-gun galleon
- Armament: 46 guns of various weights of shot

General characteristics after 1615 rebuild
- Class & type: 40-gun great ship
- Tons burthen: 700
- Length: 97 ft (30 m) (keel)
- Beam: 37 ft (11 m)
- Depth of hold: 15 ft (4.6 m)
- Sail plan: Full-rigged ship
- Armament: 40 guns of various weights of shot

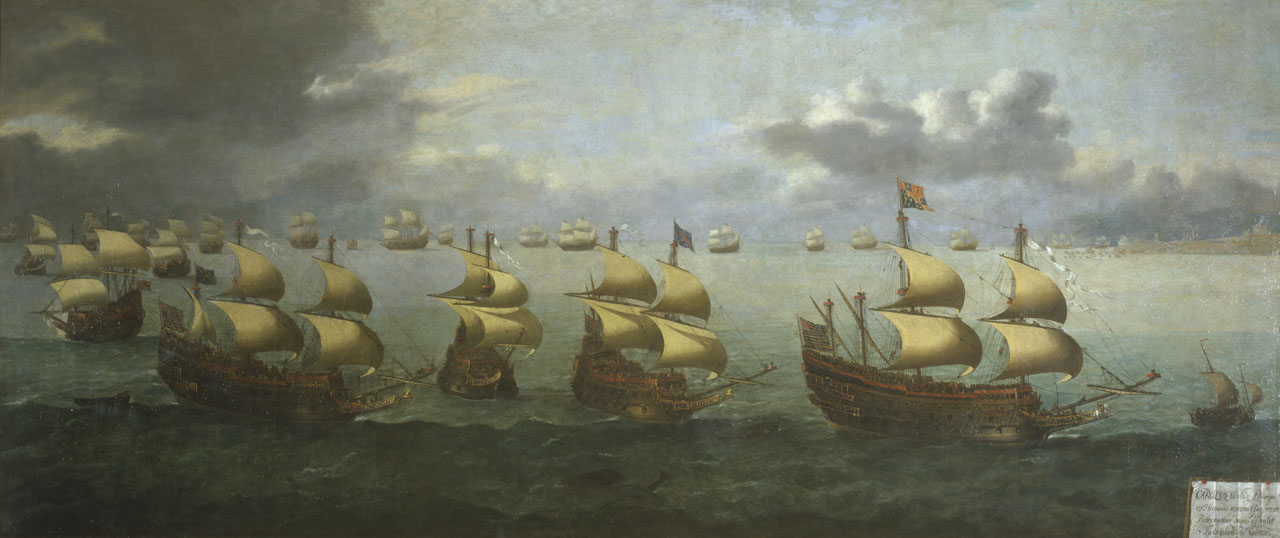
Defiance took part in the return of Prince Charles from Spain on 5 October 1623, by Hendrick Cornelisz Vroom at the National Maritime Museum

Defiance (Note: The 'HMS' prefix was not used until the middle of the 18th century, but is sometimes applied retrospectively) was a 46-gun galleon of the English Tudor navy, launched in 1590.

She was rebuilt as a 40-gun great ship in 1615 by Phineas Pett I at Woolwich. Defiance was sold out of the navy in 1650.

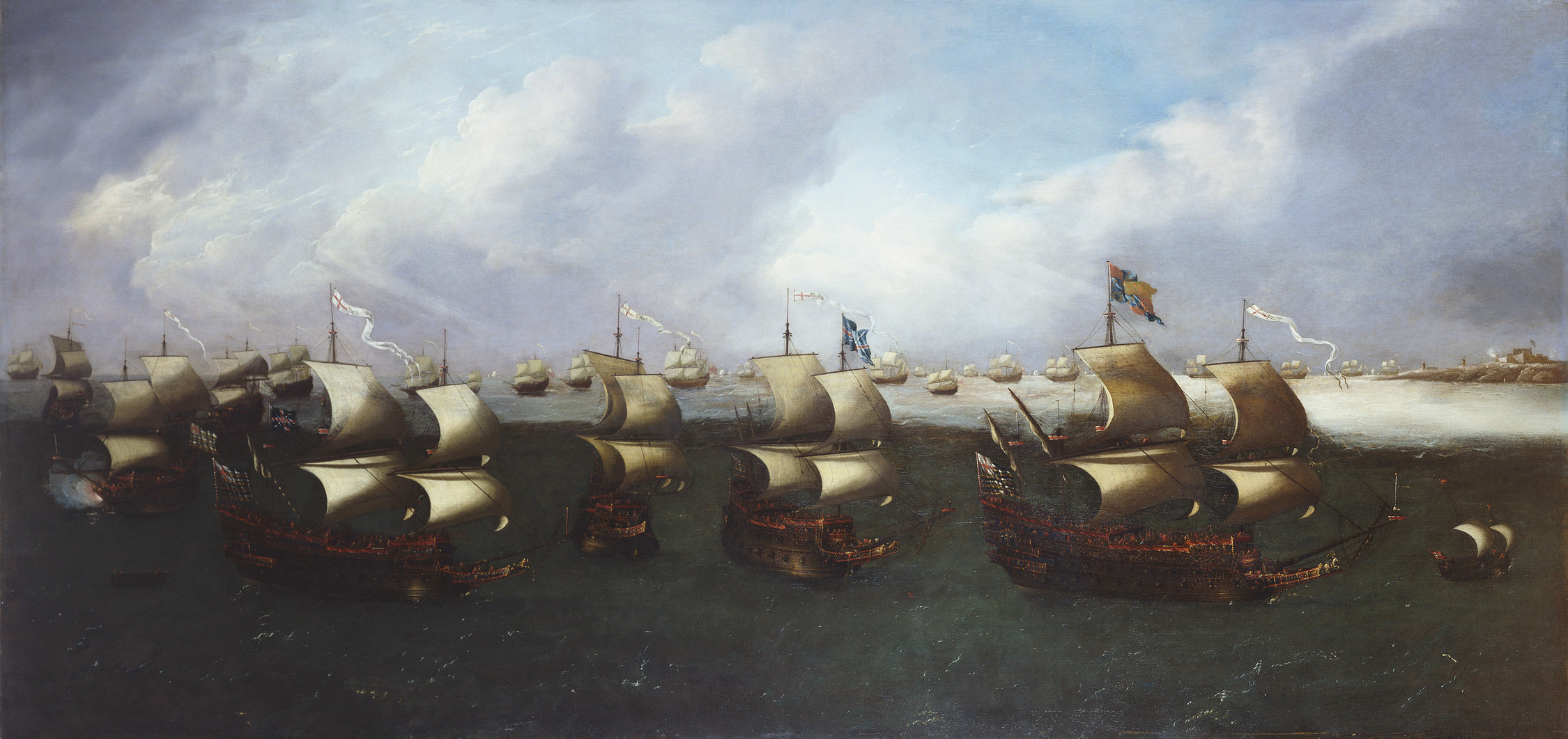
The Return of the Fleet, by Cornelis Vroom in the Royal Collection
