= English ship Lion (1557) =

English full-rigged ship, built 1557

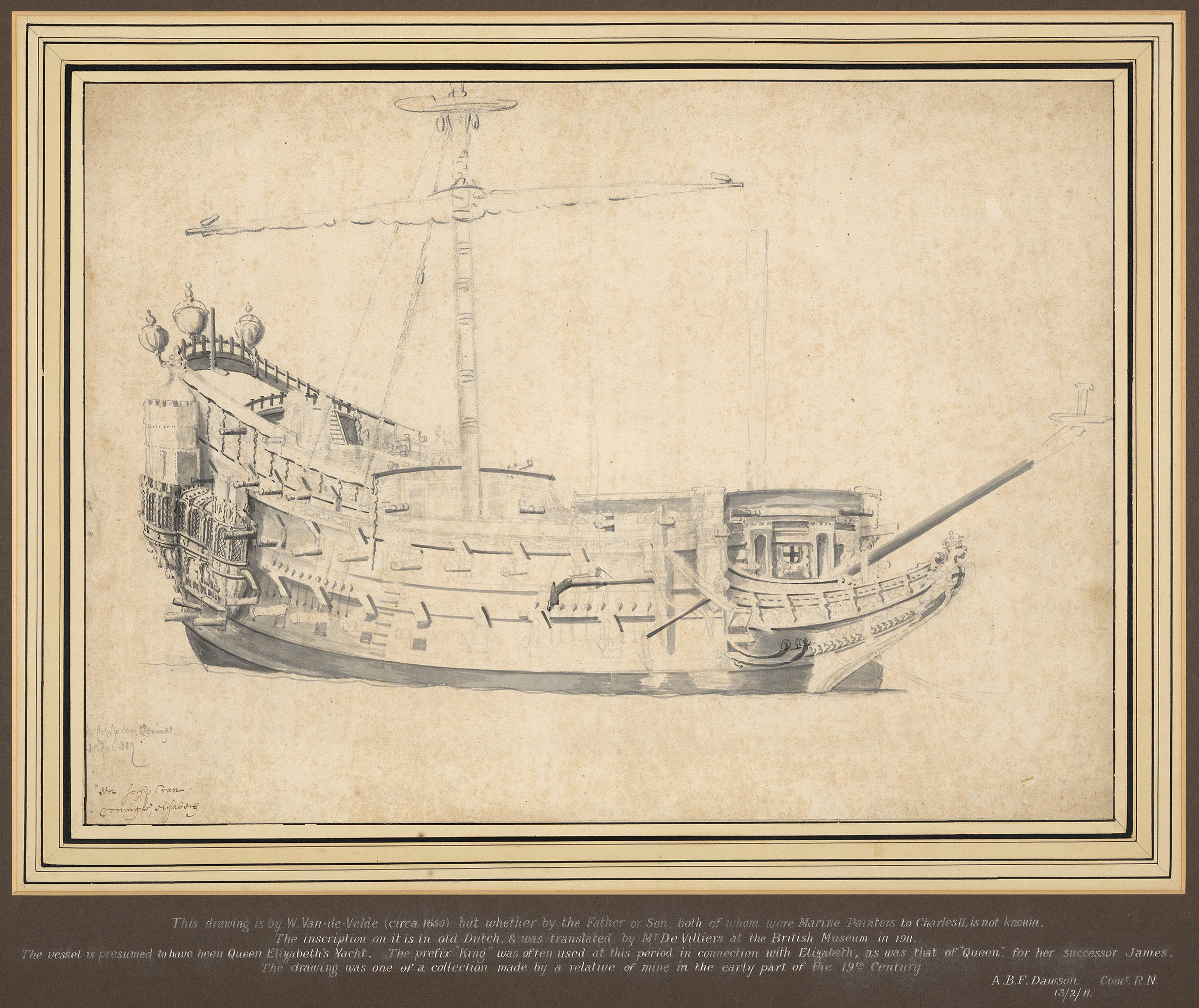
- English ship (Lion) c.1648, by Willem van de Velde the Elder

History

England
- Name: Golden Lion
- Launched: 1557
- Renamed: Lion
- Fate: Sold, 1698

General characteristics as built
- Propulsion: Sails

General characteristics after 1582 rebuild
- Propulsion: Sails

General characteristics after 1609 rebuild
- Class & type: 38-gun great ship
- Tons burthen: 650
- Length: 91 ft (28 m) (keel)
- Beam: 34 ft 6 in (10.52 m)
- Depth of hold: 16 ft (4.9 m)
- Sail plan: Full-rigged ship
- Armament: 38 guns of various weights of shot

General characteristics after 1640 rebuild
- Tons burthen: 626
- Length: 95 ft (29 m) (keel)
- Beam: 33 ft (10 m)
- Depth of hold: 15 ft (4.6 m)
- Sail plan: Full-rigged ship

General characteristics after 1658 rebuild
- Class & type: 48-gun third rate ship of the line
- Tons burthen: 717
- Length: 112 ft (34 m) (keel)
- Beam: 35 ft 4 in (10.77 m)
- Depth of hold: 15 ft 6 in (4.72 m)
- Sail plan: Full-rigged ship
- Armament: 48 guns of various weights of shot

Golden Lion (also sometimes Red Lion) (Note: The 'HMS' prefix was not used until the middle of the Eighteenth Century, but is sometimes applied retrospectively) was a ship of the English Tudor navy, launched in 1557. She was rebuilt for the first time in 1582.

By the time of her second rebuild, in 1609, she was known as Lion. She was rebuilt at Deptford as a Great ship of 38 guns.

In 1613 The Lion was appointed to escort Princess Elizabeth, daughter of James VI and I, and Frederick V of the Palatinate sailing in The Prince Royal from Margate to Ostend.

In 1640 she was rebuilt again, this time at Woolwich. She was rebuilt for a final time at Chatham in 1658, as a 48-gun third rate ship of the line. By 1677 Lion was mounting 60 guns.

She was sold out of the navy in 1698.
