= English ship Quittance (1590) =

History

Kingdom of England
- Name: Quittance
- Builder: Mathew Baker
- Launched: 1590
- Commissioned: 1590
- Fate: Condemned 1618

General characteristics
- Class & type: Small Galleon
- Tons burthen: 216/270 tons bm
- Length: 64 ft 0 in (19.5 m) keel
- Beam: 26 ft 0 in (7.9 m)
- Depth of hold: 13 ft 0 in (4.0 m)
- Propulsion: Sail
- Sail plan: ship-rigged
- Complement: 100 (1603)
- Armament: 6 × demi-culverins; 7 × sakers; 6 × minions; 2 × falcons

Quittance was a small galleon in the service of the English Navy Royal. She spent her early career in expeditions as far as Cadiz. She was later assigned to the Channel Guard during two more attempts by Philip II of Spain to invade England. she maintained this assignment until she went to Monson's squadron then back to the English Channel. She was condemned in 1618.

Quittance was the only named vessel in the English and Royal Navies.

== Construction and specifications ==
She was built on the Thames possibly at Deptford under the guidance of Master Shipwright Mathew Baker. She was launched in 1590. Her dimensions were 64 feet 0 inches (19.5 metres) for keel with a breadth of 26 feet 0 inches (7.9 metres) and a depth of hold of 13 feet 0 inches (4.0 metres). Her tonnage was between 216 and 270 tons.

Her gun armament was in 1603 21 guns consisting of six demi-culverines, (Note: A demi-culverin was a gun of 3,400 pounds with a four-inch bore firing a 9.5-pound shot with an eight-pound powder charge.) seven sakers, (Note: A sacar or saker was a gun of 1,400 pounds with a 3.5-inch bore firing a 5.5-pound shot with a 5.5-pound powder charge.) six minions (Note: A minion was a gun of 1,000 pounds with a 3.5-inch bore firing a 4-pound shot with a 4-pound powder charge.) and two falcons (Note: A falcon was a gun of 660 pounds with a 2.5-inch bore firing a 2-pound shot with a 3.5-pound powder charge.) plus two fowlers. (Note: A fowler was an anti-personnel breech-loading gun that fired either stone or grape shot. the weapon weighed about 5 cwt and the breech weighed another 1 cwt.) Her manning was around 100 officers and men in 1603.

== Commissioned service ==
She was commissioned in 1590 under Captain Francis Burnell for service with Hawkyns and Frobisher's expedition. In 1594 Captain Henry Savile was her commander and assigned to Frobisher's squadron. In 1596 she was commanded by Captain Sir George Clifford for a voyage to Cadiz, Spain. Captain Humphrey Reynolds was her commander with Sir Richard Leveson's Channel Guard in 1599. She was with the Channel Guard until 1601. In 1602 she was assigned Captain Bryan Brown until September 1602 Then Captain Peter Beeston with Monson's squadron. In 1603 Captain Francis Howard was in command for service in the English Channel.

== Disposition ==
Quittance was Condemned in 1618.
