= English ship Mary Rose (1556) =

English warship, built 1556

History

England
- Name: Mary Rose
- Fate: Condemned 1618

General characteristics as built
- Class & type: Galleon
- Tons burthen: 450

General characteristics after 1589 rebuild
- Class & type: 29-gun great ship
- Tons burthen: 476 tons
- Length: 85 ft (26 m) (keel)
- Beam: 33 ft (10 m)
- Depth of hold: 17 ft (5.2 m)
- Sail plan: Full-rigged ship
- Complement: 250 (1603)
- Armament: 29 carriage guns of various weights of shot, plus 3 smaller weapons

The Mary Rose was a galleon of the English Tudor navy, built in 1555–1556. She was rebuilt during 1589. (Note: The "HMS" prefix was not used until the middle of the 18th century, but is sometimes applied retrospectively) Her complement was 250 comprising 150 mariners, 30 gunners and 70 soldiers.

She was condemned in 1618 and expended as part of a wharf at Chatham Dockyard.
