= English ship Rainbow (1586) =

English warship, built 1586

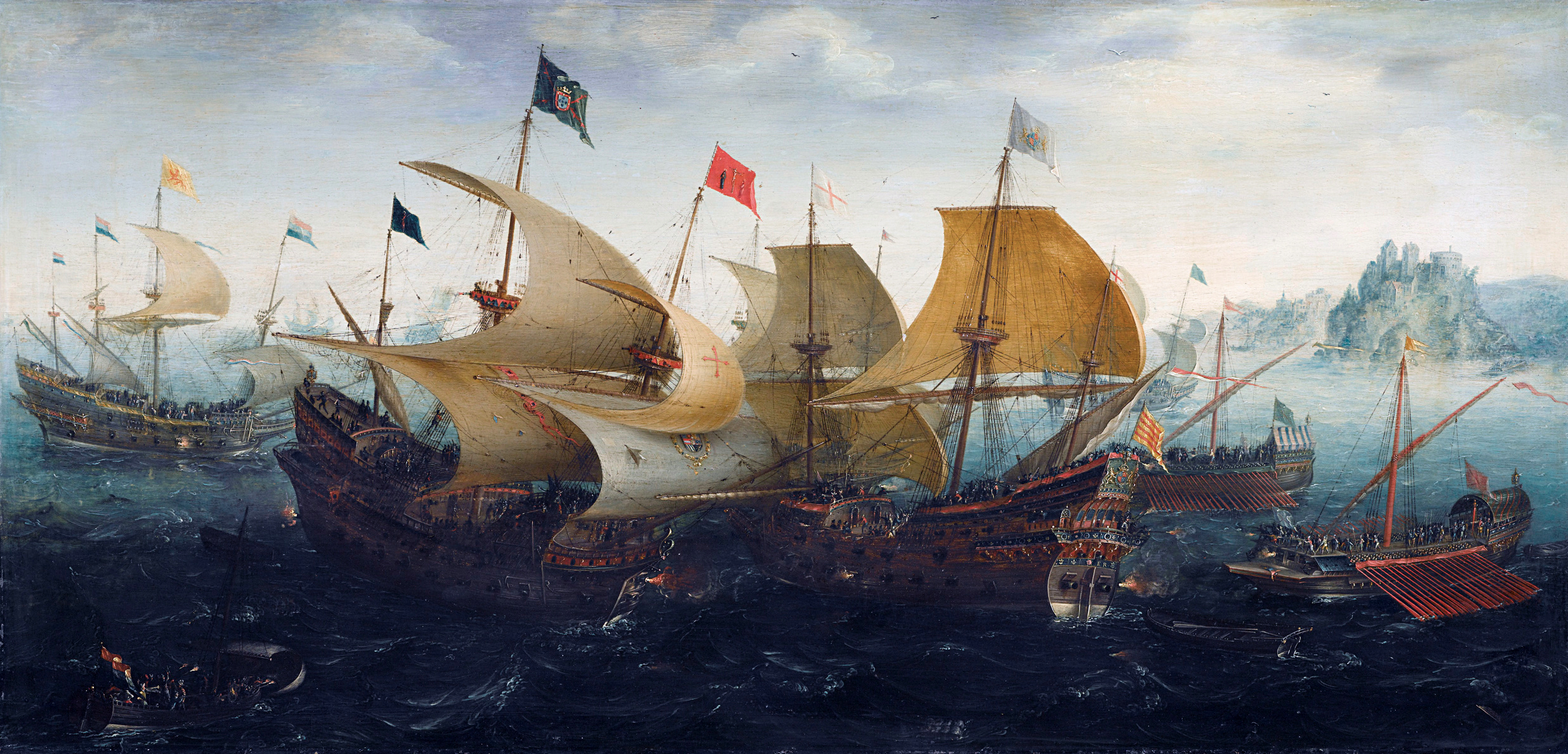
- The flagship of Admiral Medina Sidonia (aka Cadiz) San Martin is attacked off the coast of Dover from port side by the English Rainbow and from starboard by the Dutch Gouden Leeuw, Dover, 8 August 1588

History

England
- Name: Rainbow
- Launched: 1586
- Fate: Sunk as a breakwater, 1680
- Notes: Participated in: Singeing the King of Spain's Beard; Spanish Armada; Battle of Gravelines; Battle of Portland; Battle of the Gabbard; Battle of Scheveningen; Battle of Lowestoft; Four Days' Battle; St James' Day Fight; Battle of Solebay; Battles of Schooneveld; Battle of Texel

General characteristics as built
- Class & type: Galleon
- Tons burthen: 480
- Length: 100 ft (30 m) (keel)
- Beam: 32 ft (9.8 m)
- Depth of hold: 12 ft (3.7 m)
- Complement: 250
- Armament: 26 guns, comprising (1603); 6 demi-cannon, 12 culverins; 7 demi-culverins and 1 saker

General characteristics after 1617 rebuild
- Class & type: 40-gun great ship
- Tons burthen: 731
- Length: 112 ft (34 m) (keel)
- Beam: 36 ft 3 in (11.05 m)
- Depth of hold: 13 ft 6 in (4.11 m)
- Sail plan: Full-rigged ship
- Armament: 40 guns of various weights of shot

General characteristics after 1629 rebuild
- Class & type: 40-gun great ship
- Tons burthen: 863
- Length: 114 ft (35 m) (keel)
- Beam: 37 ft 10 in (11.53 m)
- Draught: 17 ft 6 in (5.33 m)
- Depth of hold: 15 ft 0 in (4.57 m)
- Sail plan: Full-rigged ship
- Armament: 54 guns of various weights of shot

Rainbow (Note: The HMS prefix was not used until the middle of the 18th century, but is sometimes applied retrospectively.) was a galleon of the English Tudor navy, built at Deptford Dockyard by Peter Pett (the first of that name in this extensive family), and launched in 1586. Commanded by Lord Henry Seymour, a younger son of Edward Seymour, 1st Duke of Somerset by his second wife Anne Stanhope, she fought against the Spanish during the Singeing the King of Spain's Beard and the Spanish Armada, including the Battle of Gravelines in 1588, and the Raid on Cadiz in 1596.

In 1617, Rainbow was rebuilt at Deptford as a great ship (or "second rate"), mounting 34 major and 6 smaller guns. She was again reconstructed in 1628–29 at Chatham, emerging with 54 guns, although the work was classed as a "repair" rather than as an official rebuilding. In 1649 she became part of the navy of the Commonwealth of England, and in that capacity she took part in several actions of the First Anglo-Dutch War, including the Battle of Portland in February 1653, the Battle of the Gabbard in June 1653, and the Battle of Scheveningen in July 1653. In May 1660 at the Stuart Restoration she became part of the new Royal Navy as HMS Rainbow. By 1660 her armament had increased to 56 guns.

She took an active role in the Second Anglo-Dutch War, participating in the Battle of Lowestoft in June 1665, the Four Days' Battle in June 1666 and the St James' Day Fight in July 1666. She also fought in the Third Anglo-Dutch War, in the Battle of Solebay on 28 May 1672, the two Battle of Schooneveld in 28 May and 4 June 1673, and in the Battle of Texel on 11 August 1673. She was sunk as a breakwater at Sheerness in 1680.
