= English ship Advantage (1590) =

History

Kingdom of England
- Name: Advantage
- Builder: Peter & Joseph Pett
- Launched: 1590
- Commissioned: 1599
- Fate: Accidentally burnt December 1613

General characteristics
- Class & type: Small Galleon
- Tons burthen: 172.8/216 tons bm
- Length: 60 ft 0 in (18.3 m) keel
- Beam: 26 ft 0 in (7.9 m)
- Depth of hold: 12 ft 0 in (3.7 m)
- Propulsion: Sail
- Sail plan: ship-rigged
- Complement: 100 (1603)
- Armament: 6 × demi-culverins; 8 × sakers; 2 × minions; 4 x falcons

Advantage was a small galleon in the service of the English Navy Royal. She spent her career in the Channel Guard during two more attempts by Philip II of Spain to invade England. She maintained this assignment until she went to the English Channel. She was accidentally burnt in Scotland in 1613.

Advantage was the first named vessel in the English and Royal Navies.

== Construction and specifications ==
She was built on the Thames possibly at Deptford under the guidance of Master Shipwrights Peter and Joseph Pett. She was launched in 1590. Her dimensions were 60 feet 0 inches (18.3 metres) for keel with a breadth of 26 feet 0 inches (7.9 metres) and a depth of hold of 12 feet 0 inches (3.7 metres). Her tonnage was between 172.8 and 216 tons.

Her gun armament was in 1603 18 guns consisting of six demi-culverines, (Note: A demi-culverin was a gun of 3,400 pounds with a four inch bore firing a 9.5 pound shot with an eight pound powder charge.) eight sakers, (Note: A sacar or saker was a gun of 1,400 pounds with a 3.5 inch bore firing a 5.5 pound shot with an 5.5 pound powder charge.) two minions (Note: A minion was a gun of 1,000 pounds with a 3.5 inch bore firing a 4 pound shot with an 4 pound powder charge.) and two falcons. (Note: A falcon was a gun of 660 pounds with a 2.5 inch bore firing a 2 pound shot with a 3.5 pound powder charge.) Her manning was around 100 officers and men in 1603.

== Commissioned service ==
She was commissioned in 1599 under Captain Thomas Coverte for service with Sir Richard Leveson's Channel Guard in 1599. She was with the Channel Guard until January/February 1600. Later that year she was under Captain George Fenner then Captain Sackville Trevor in 1601 followed by Captain William Jones in 1602 for service in the English Channel.

== Disposition ==
Advantage was accidentally burnt in Scotland in December 1613.
