= English ship White Bear =

History

England
- Name: White Bear
- Builder: Woolwich Dockyard
- Launched: 1563
- Fate: Sold, 1629

General characteristics as built
- Tons burthen: 729 tons

General characteristics after 1598-1599 rebuild
- Class & type: 57-gun royal ship
- Tons burthen: 732 tons
- Length: 110 ft (34 m) (keel)
- Beam: 37 ft (11 m)
- Depth of hold: 18 ft (5.5 m)
- Sail plan: Full-rigged ship
- Complement: 500
- Armament: 57 guns of various weights of shot (1603) - all brass, comprising 2 cannon periers, 6 demi-cannon, 21 culverins, 16 demi-culverins and 12 sakers

White Bear (Note: The "HMS" prefix was not used until the middle of the 18th century, but is sometimes applied retrospectively) was a 40-gun ship of the English Tudor navy, launched in 1563. She was repaired in 1585–86 at Woolwich, and recommissioned under Lord Howard of Effingham. In 1588 she took part in the actions against the Spanish Armada, under the command of Lord Edmund Sheffield. She was rebuilt in 1599 as a 57-gun royal ship.

The White Bear remained in service until 1627, when she was deemed unserviceable, and was sold out of the navy at Rochester on 12 June 1629.

The timbers from the White Bear were used to rebuild a burned-down alehouse on the Old Packhorse track running between Halifax and Leeds (now known as The Old White Beare in the village of Norwood Green near Halifax).

There is also another pub called "the White Bear" in Bedale (North Yorkshire), which is named after the vessel. The pub sign is adorned with a ship.
