= English ship Crane (1590) =

First named vessel in the English Navy

History

Kingdom of England
- Name: Crane
- Builder: Richard Chapman
- Launched: 1590
- Commissioned: 1590
- Fate: Sold 17 June 1629

General characteristics
- Class & type: Small Galleon; Fourth Rate - 1626
- Tons burthen: 202.8/253.5 tons bm
- Length: 60 ft 0 in (18.3 m) keel
- Beam: 26 ft 0 in (7.9 m)
- Depth of hold: 13 ft 0 in (4.0 m)
- Propulsion: Sail
- Sail plan: ship-rigged
- Complement: 100 (1603)
- Armament: 6 × demi-culverins; 7 × sakers; 6 × minions

Crane was a small galleon in the service of the English Navy Royal. She spent her early career in expeditions as far as Cadiz and the Azores. She later was assigned to the Channel Guard during two more attempts by Philip II of Spain to invade England. She maintained this assignment until she went to the Irish Station then back to the English Channel. She was finally sold in 1629.

Crane was the first named vessel in the English and Royal Navies.

== Construction and specifications ==
She was built on the Thames possibly at Deptford under the guidance of Master Shipwright Richard Chapman. She was launched in 1590. Her dimensions were 60 feet 0 inches (18.3 metres) for keel with a breadth of 26 feet 0 inches (7.9 metres) and a depth of hold of 13 feet 0 inches (4.0 metres). Her tonnage was between 202.9 and 253.5 tons.

In 1603, she had 18 guns consisting of six demi-culverines, (Note: A demi-culverin was a gun of 3,400 pounds with a four inch bore firing a 9.5 pound shot with an eight pound powder charge.) seven sakers, (Note: A sacar or saker was a gun of 1,400 pounds with a 3.5 inch bore firing a 5.5 pound shot with an 5.5 pound powder charge.) six minions (Note: A minion was a gun of 1,000 pounds with a 3.5 inch bore firing a 4 pound shot with an 4 pound powder charge.) and two fowlers. (Note: A fowler was an anti-personnel breech-loading gun that fired either stone or grape shot. the weapon weighed about 5 cwt and the breech weighed another 1 cwt.) Her manning was around 100 officers and men in 1603.

== Commissioned service ==
She was commissioned in 1590 under Captain John Bostocke for service with Hawkyns and Frobisher's expedition. In 1591 she was with Lord Thomas to the Azores. In 1594 Captain Humphrey Reynolds was her commander and assigned to Frobisher's squadron. In 1596 she was commanded by Captain Jonas Bradbury for a voyage to Cadiz, Spain. Captain Sir Alexander Clifford was her commander with Sir Richard Leveson's Channel Guard in 1599. She was with the Channel Guard until July 1599.Later that year she was again under Captain Bradbury for the mobilization of the Fleet. She then came under the command of Captain Clifford in January 1600, followed by Captain Walter Gore in September 1600 and followed by Captain Thomas Coverte in November/December 1600, all three commanders for the Channel Guard. In 1601 she was assigned Captain Edward Manwaring for service on the Irish Station until March 1602. Then Captain Thomas Mansell took over until September 1602. Captain William Jones and Captain J. White were her last commanders for service in the English Channel.

== Disposition ==
Crane was sold at Rochester on 17 June 1629.
