= List of ship launches in the 1630s =

The list of ship launches in the 1630s includes a chronological list of some ships launched from 1630 to 1639.

	Ship	Class / type	Builder	Location	Country	Notes
1630	The Ark	Merchant ship			England	
4 July 1631	Blessing of the Bay	Barque	Robert Molton	New Bedford	(England) Massachusetts Bay Colony	Second ship built in the United States.
1631	Vanguard	Warship	Bright	Woolwich	England	For Royal Navy
1632	Aemelia	Ship of the line	Jan Salomonszoon	Rotterdam	Dutch Republic	Largest Dutch ship of its time
1632	Charles	Second-rate ship of the line	Peter Pett	Woolwich	England	For Royal Navy
1633	Charles	Man-of-war			England	For Royal Navy.
1633	Couronne	Emblematic ship	Isaac de Razilly	La Roche-Bernard	Kingdom of France	For French Navy.
1633	Henrietta Maria	Second-rate ship of the line	Deptford Dockyard	London	England	For Royal Navy.
1634	James	Second-rate ship of the line	Deptford Dockyard	London	England	For Royal Navy.
1634	Princess Amelia	Merchant ship			Dutch Republic	For Dutch West India Company.
1634	Unicorn	Second-rate ship of the line	Edward Boate	Woolwich	England	For Royal Navy.
1635	Leopard	Third-rate ship of the line	Peter Pett	Woolwich	England	For Royal Navy.
20 March 1637	Expedition	Pinnace	Matthew Graves	Bermondsey	England	For Royal Navy.
13 October 1637	Sovereign of the Seas	First-rate ship of the line	Peter Pett	Woolwich	England	For Royal Navy.
Unknown date	Het Fliegende Hert	Sloop			Dutch Republic	For private owner.
Unknown date	Griffin	Transport ship			England	For private owner
