= 1637 Group =

Class overview
- Name: 1637 Group
- Builders: Matthew Graves, Bermondsey; Robert Tranckmore, St Saviour's Dock, Bermondsey
- Operators: English Navy Royal Commonwealth Of England Kingdom of England
- Preceded by: English ship Mary Rose (1623)
- Succeeded by: 1646 Programme
- Built: 1637
- In service: 1637 - 1668
- Completed: 2
- Lost: 1
- Retired: 1

General characteristics
- Type: Small Ship
- Tons burthen: 32358/94 tons bm initially, then after girdling 35762/94 tons bm
- Length: 90 ft 0 in (27.4 m) keel
- Beam: 26 ft (7.9 m) initially, later 27 ft 4 in (8.3 m)
- Depth of hold: 13 ft 0 in (4.0 m) initially, later 11 ft (3.4 m)
- Sail plan: ship-rigged
- Complement: 120 in 1652, 140 in 1653
- Armament: 30 guns initially, later 32 or 34

The 1637 Group of warships for the Navy Royal of King Charles I consisted of two 300 ton 'pinnaces' (early frigates) intended to carry fourteen pieces of ordnance and sixteen banks of oars, which were ordered on 12 December 1636. These vessels as built would carry thirty pieces of ordnance with ten pairs of ports on the gundeck, with two pairs of lighter guns forward and four pairs aft on the upper deck. The waist would be unprotected until two more pairs of gun ports were added later. Their measurements would compare favourably to the 'frigate' type vessels built a decade later. Their proportions (their keel length to beam ratio of 3.46 : 1) anticipated by nearly a decade the true frigates like the Constant Warwick. Their initial deployment was to the coast of Morocco, where both ships participated in an attack against the Barbary corsairs of Salé.

== Design, specification and reconstruction ==
The ships were built in Bermondsey under contract. Only order dates and launch dates are available for each ship. The specified dimensions were 90 feet (27.4 metres) keel length with a breadth of 26 feet (7.9 metres) and depth of hold of 13 feet (4.0 metres). The builder's measurement was consequently 32358/94 tons. When the vessels were remeasured after being girdled their beam was increased to 27 feet 4 inches (8.3 metres) and depth of hold reduced to 11 feet (3.4 metres). Their builder's measurement was then 35762/94 tons. Even with their wider beam of 27 ft 4in after the girdling, their new keel length : beam to ratio of 3.29 : 1 meant that they were similar in proportion to the Constant Warwick.

The gun armaments will be specified on within the individual ship articles as they varied between the vessels. As built they carried thirty guns, comprising culverins (Note: A culverin was a gun of 4,500 pounds with a 5.5 inch bore firing a 17.5 pound (later 18 pound) shot with a twelve pound powder charge.) and demi-culverins on the gundeck (where they had ten pairs of gunports), (Note: A demi-culverin was a gun of 3,400 pounds with a four inch bore firing a 9.5 pound (later 9 pound) shot with an eight pound powder charge.) and sakers on the quarterdeck and forecastle (where they had four and two pairs of gunports respectively). (Note: A saker was a gun of 1,400 pounds with a 3.5 inch bore firing a 5.5 pound shot with an 5.5 pound powder charge.) The initial manning of the ships was 120 personnel up to 1652. During the battles of the First Anglo-Dutch War (1652–54) these two ships were rated as 32 or 34 guns, with 140 personnel, but by the Stuart Restoration in June 1660 each was listed as having a (peacetime) establishment of just 30 guns again and 100 men.

The consensus is that in peacetime they retained 18 guns in their gundeck (of the 12 culverins and 8 demi-culverins carried in wartime), but their upper deck (created by building a complete deck linking the forecastle and quarterdeck) had just 12 sakers (4 forward and 8 aft of the unarmed waist).

== Ships of the 1637 Group ==
Name	Builder	Launch date	Remarks
Expedition	Matthew Graves, Bermondsey	20 March 1637	Converted to and re-rated as a fireship in June 1667, then sold in October 1667
Providence	Robert Tranckmore, St Saviour's Dock, Bermondsey	21 March 1637	Converted to and re-rated as a fireship in June 1667, then wrecked at Tangier on 31 October 1668
