= English ship Henrietta Maria =

History

England
- Name: Henrietta Maria
- Builder: Goddard, Deptford Dockyard
- Launched: 1633
- Renamed: Paragon, 1650
- Fate: Lost, 1655

General characteristics
- Class & type: 42-gun second rank ship of the line
- Tons burthen: 793
- Length: 110 ft (34 m) (keel)
- Beam: 37 ft 6 in (11.43 m)
- Depth of hold: 16 ft 2 1/2 in (4.9 m)
- Sail plan: Full-rigged ship
- Armament: 42 guns of various weights of shot

Henrietta Maria was a 42-gun second rank ship of the line of the English navy, launched at Deptford Dockyard in 1633. She was renamed Paragon in 1652, under which name she took parts in the Battles of Elba and Leghorn, and in William Penn's expedition to the West Indies. In 1655, she was lost following an accidental fire off of the coast of Cuba.

== Construction ==
On 15 September 1631, Charles I placed an order for three new major warships, of which Henrietta Maria was one. This order was reduced to two ships in May 1632, and that October they were named Charles and Henrietta Maria after the king and queen. A further two ships (Unicorn and James) were ordered the following year.

Henrietta Maria was built by Goddard at Deptford Dockyard and launched in 1633.

== Career ==
Henrietta Maria was commissioned in 1635 under Captain Thomas Porter. In 1650, she was renamed Paragon whilst serving in the navy of the Commonwealth of England.

In August 1652, Paragon fought under the command of Richard Badiley in the Battle of Elba in the First Anglo-Dutch War, suffering 25 killed and 56 wounded, but evading capture. She then fought in the Battle of Leghorn in March 1653.

In 1654, Paragon was deployed to the West Indies as part of a fleet under Admiral William Penn. Paragon served as at the flagship of the expedition's vice-admiral, William Goodson.

Paragon was lost in 1655 off of the coast of Cuba, following an accidental fire. Around 100 crew members died.

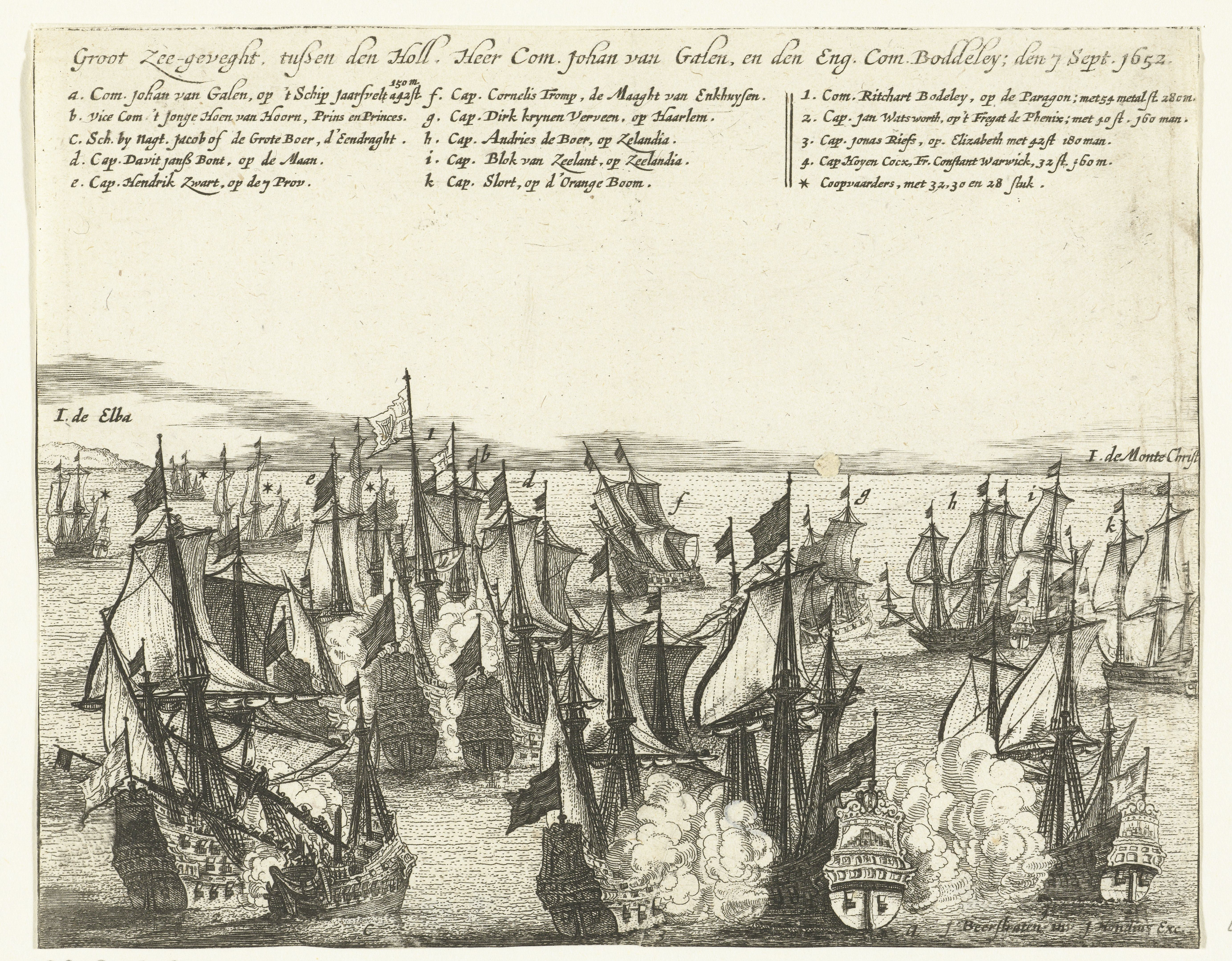
Paragon under the command of Richard Badiley during the Battle of Elba between the Staatse fleet under Van Galen and the English fleet, 1652
