= 1649 Programme Group =

Class of ships

Class overview
- Name: 1649 Programme
- Builders: Portsmouth Dockyard; Deptford Dockyard; Woolwich Dockyard
- Operators: Commonwealth Of England; Royal Navy (from June 1660)
- Preceded by: 1647 Programme
- Succeeded by: 1650 Programme
- Built: 1649 - 1651
- In service: 1650 - 1711
- Completed: 5
- Lost: 4
- Retired: 1

General characteristics
- Type: 38-gun Fourth Rate
- Sail plan: ship-rigged
- Complement: 150/1652, 160/1653
- Armament: 38 guns

The 1649 Programme of five additional warships for the Navy of the new English Commonwealth ("to be frigate fashion") was approved by the Council of State on 25 March 1649, less than two months after the execution of King Charles I and the creation of a republican government. Three of these frigates, intended to be classed as Fourth rates, were ordered in late March (although of these the Worcester would be delayed and altered while building to a Third rate), while on 12 April orders were placed for two larger Third rates to serve as flagships for the Winter Guard (Speaker and Fairfax). The vessels as completed would actually have a varying number of guns and the dimensional data would vary considerably. They followed on from the three vessels ordered in December 1645 (the 1646 Programme Group) and four more in 1747 (the 1647 Programme Group).

== Designs, specifications and reconstruction ==
The construction of the vessels was assigned to the state dockyards. The ships would be designed by and built under the supervision of the Master Shipwright of each Dockyard. As with most vessels of this time period only launch years are available. The dimensions and armament of these various frigates was so varied that it will be listed in the articles on the individual vessels.

By 1660 all four surviving vessels had been reconstructed (although precise details of the work is unrecorded) and the Portsmouth and President were each established with 38 guns and 130 men, while the Worcester had 48 guns and 230 men and the Speaker had 50 guns and 220 men.

== Ships of the 1649 Programme ==
Name	Builder	Launch year	Remarks
Portsmouth	Portsmouth Dockyard	1650	Captured by the French 58-gun Marquise in the Channel and blown up on 9 August 1689
President	Deptford Dockyard	1650	Renamed Bonaventure in 1660; Rebuilt at Chatham in 1663; Rebuilt at Portsmouth 1690; Rebuilt at Woolwich 1699; Broken up at Chatham 1711
Worcester	Woolwich Dockyard	1651	Renamed Dunkirk in 1660; Reduced to Fourth Rate 1695-96; Rebuilt at Blackwall 1704; Foundered in the Channel in 1705
Speaker	Woolwich Dockyard	1650	Renamed Mary in 1660; Rebuilt at Woolwich 1687-88; Wrecked on the Goodwin Sands in 1703
Fairfax	Deptford Dockyard	1650	Burnt by accident at Chatham in 1653
