= Battle of Elba =

1652 naval battle during First Anglo-Dutch War

Coordinates: 42°45′0″N 10°13′48″E

- Part of the First Anglo-Dutch War
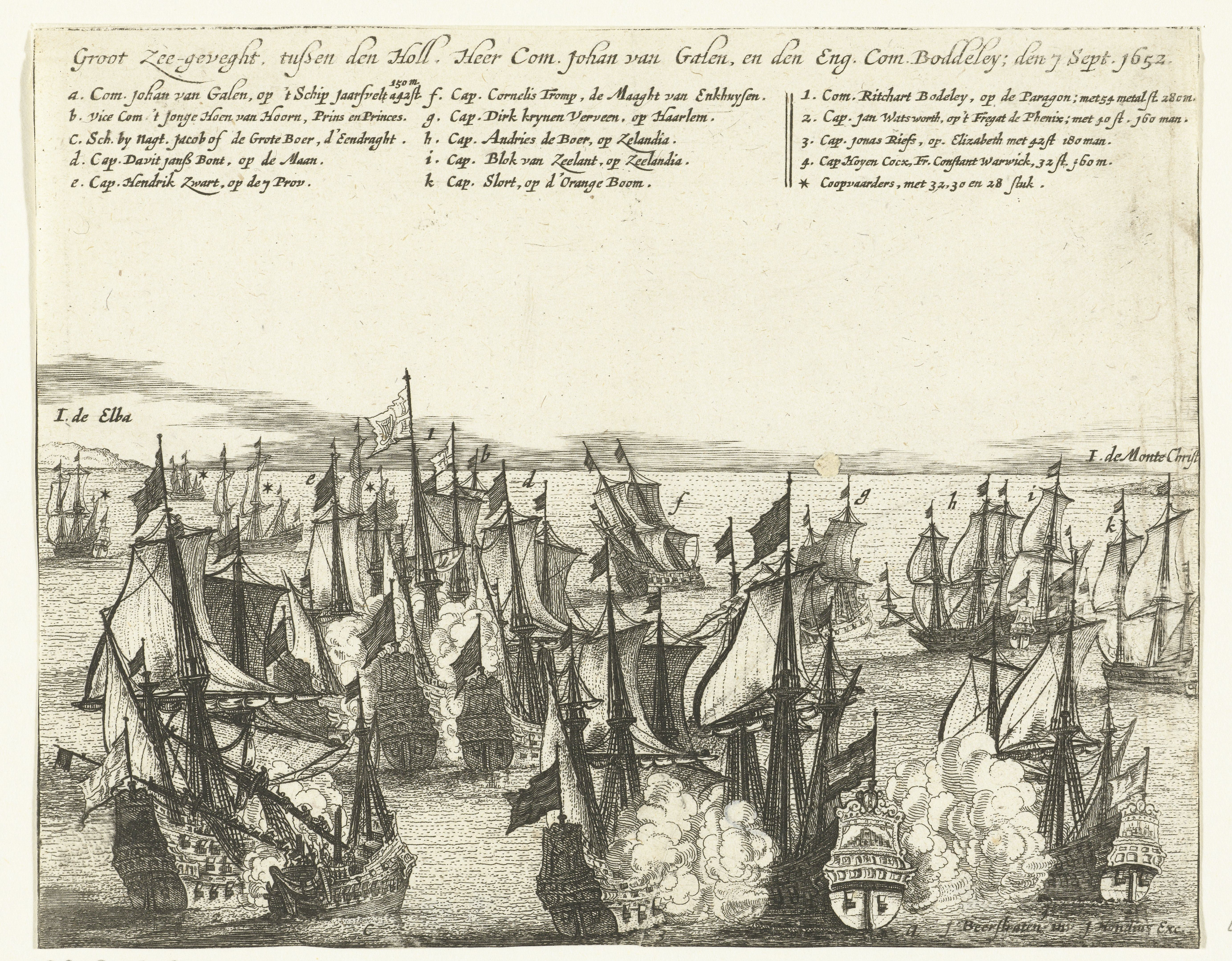
Date	28 August 1652
Location	near Elba, Italy
Result	Dutch victory

Belligerents
Commonwealth of England	United Provinces

Commanders and leaders
Richard Badiley	Johan van Galen

Strength
4 warships	10 warships

Casualties and losses
1 ship captured	No ships lost

The naval Battle of Elba (or Battle of Monte Cristo) was a naval battle which took place on 28 August 1652 during the First Anglo-Dutch War, between a Dutch squadron under Johan van Galen and an English squadron under Captain Richard Badiley.

== Battle ==
The English were trying to reach Livorno, where a squadron under Captain Henry Appleton was under siege by the Dutch squadron. Leaving four of his fourteen vessels to maintain the watch over Livorno, van Galen took his remaining ten ships to intercept Badiley's squadron. The two encountered each other between Montecristo and Elba Islands. The Phoenix was captured by the Jaarsveld, while the other English warships retreated into Porto Longone. The captured ship, Phoenix, was recaptured 2 months later during a night raid at Livorno.

Ships involved:

=== Netherlands ===
- Jaarsveld 44 (Rear-Admiral Johan van Galen)
- Prinses Roijaal 34 (Albert Corneliszoon 't Hoen; killed)
- Wapen van Zeeland 32 (Joost Willemszoon Block; killed)
- Eendracht 40 (Vice-Admiral Jacob de Boer)
- Maan 40 (David Janszoon Bondt; killed)
- Vereenigde Provinciën/Zeven Provinciën 40 (Hendrick Claeszoon Swart; killed)
- Haarlem 40 (Dirck Quiinen Verveen)
- Maagd van Enkhuysen 34 (Cornelis Tromp)
- Zeelandia 32 (Andries de Boer)
- Jonge Prins 28 (Cornelis Barentszoon Slordt)

The Jaarsveld and four other ships of the squadron belonged to the Amsterdam Admiralty, but the Prinses Roijaal, Eendracht and Jonge Prins belonged to the Noorderkwartier Admiralty, while Wapen van Zeeland and Zeelandia belonged to the Zeeland Admiralty.

=== England ===
- Paragon 42 (Admiral Richard Badiley)
- Elizabeth 38 (Capt. Jonas Reeves)
- Phoenix 38 (Capt. John Wadsworth) - Captured by Eendracht
- Constant Warwick 32 (Capt. Owen Cox)

The squadron was convoying four merchantmen, who however took no part in the Action and made their way independently into Porto Longone.

- Mary Rose 32 (Capt. Jonas Poole)
- William and Thomas 30 (Capt. John Godolphin)
- Thomas Bonaventure 28 (Capt. George Hughes??)
- Richard and William 24 (Capt. John Wise??)
