= 1647 Programme Group =

Class of ships

Class overview
- Name: 1647 Programme (Group of English warships)
- Builders: Woolwich Dockyard; Deptford Dockyard; Chatham Dockyard
- Operators: Kingdom of England; Commonwealth Of England; Royal Navy
- Preceded by: 1646 Programme
- Succeeded by: 1649 Programme
- Built: 1647
- In service: 1647 - 1709
- Completed: 4
- Lost: 2
- Retired: 2

General characteristics
- Type: 32 to 34-gun Fourth rate
- Tons burthen: 370 tons bm (design)
- Sail plan: ship-rigged
- Complement: 150 in 1652, 160 in 1653
- Armament: 32 to 34 guns initially, later up to 42 guns

The 1647 Programme of four additional Fourth rate vessels for the English Navy Royal was approved by Parliament on 9 January 1647, following a recommendation on 31 December 1646 by the Admiralty Committee that four new frigates should be built, each to be of 370 tons and to carry 32 guns. Like the three vessels built in the previous year under the 1646 Programme, each vessel would have eleven pairs of gunports on its sole gundeck, with further ports on the quarterdeck above. While nominally built for the Kingdom of England, and thus nominally the property of the Stuart King, their construction during the English Civil War was actually ordered by the Parliamentary side, and with the execution of King Charles I in January 1649 these ships (and preceding vessels) passed under the control of the new Commonwealth of England, and remained as such until the Stuart Restoration in 1660.

== Designs, specifications and reconstruction ==
Orders placed later in January 1747 with Master Shipwright Henry Goddard to build one frigate (the Dragon) at Chatham Dockyard, with Peter Pett (Snr) to build two frigates (the Elizabeth and Tiger) at Deptford Dockyard and with his son Peter Pett (Jnr) to build another frigate (Phoenix) at Woolwich Dockyard. The three Master Shipwrights were individually responsible for the respective designs for the four vessels and for supervising their construction. While all four would be classed as Fourth rates and would each have eleven pairs of gunports on their gundeck (and five or six pairs on their quarterdecks), their individual dimensions and armament differed and are listed in the articles on the individual vessels.

All four frigates were built as single-decked warships, with their main battery on the sole gundeck, with eleven pairs of gunports carrying a mixture of culverins and demi-culverins, as in the three frigates ordered under the previous year's programme. Above this gundeck they each had a long quarterdeck with either five or six pairs of ports for a mixture of demi-culverins and sakers, but lacked any forecastle. The latter omission was soon corrected, with a forecastle (as an elevated structure over the forward part of the gundeck to protect it in heavy seas, but not carrying any guns) being built to "add very much to their strength". During 1649 a small poop was added to surmount the quarterdeck, and over the next couple of years a spar deck was added above the gundeck. Initially this did not carry any guns, but by 1654 this had altered to a full upper deck bearing an upper battery of guns, with the poop becoming a new quarterdeck and with a new quarterdeck above the upper deck. They thus became two-deckers, and by June 1660 all four were each established with 38 guns and 130 men.

== Ships of the 1647 Programme ==
As with most vessels of this time period, only the years of their launch are available. All four ships served the navy of the English Parliament (and subsequently that of the Commonwealth of England) from 1647 to 1660, when they became part of the Royal Navy following the Stuart Restoration.

Name	Builder	Launch year	Gundeck length	Keel length	Original breadth	Breadth after girdling	Original burthen tonnage	Tonnage after girdling	Careers and fates
Dragon	Henry Goddard, Chatham Dockyard	1647	119 ft 10 in	96 ft 0 in	28 ft 6 in	41472/94	30 ft 1 in	46212/94	Rebuilt at Deptford in 1689-90; Rebuilt at Rotherhithe in 1706-07; Wrecked on the Casquets (near Alderney) on 26 March 1712
Phoenix	Peter Pett II, Woolwich Dockyard	1647	120 ft 0 in	96 ft 0 in	28 ft 6 in	41472/94	33 ft 0 in	5568/94	Wrecked at Gibraltar in a storm on 3 December 1664
Tiger	Peter Pett I, Deptford Dockyard	1647	123 ft 8 in	99 ft 0 in	29 ft 6 in	45310/94	34 ft 0 in	60870/94	Rebuilt at Deptford in 1682; Rebuilt at Rotherhithe 1702-03; Rebuilt at Sheerness 1718-22; Wrecked 12 January 1742
Elizabeth	Peter Pett I, Deptford Dockyard	1647	n/a	101 ft 6 in	29 ft 8 in	47515/94	34 ft 6 in	64257/94	Burnt in action with two Dutch warships off Jamestown, Virginia on 5 June 1667
