= English ship Nonsuch (1646) =

History

England
- Name: Nonsuch
- Namesake: Nonsuch Palace
- Ordered: December 1645
- Builder: Peter Pett, Deptford Dockyard
- Launched: 1646
- Commissioned: 1646
- Honours and awards: Kentish Knock 1652; Portland 1653; Gabbard 1653; Scheveningen 1653
- Fate: Wrecked at Gibraltar 3 December 1664

General characteristics
- Class & type: 34-gun fourth rate
- Tons burthen: 41844/94 bm
- Length: 98 ft 0 in (29.9 m) keel for tonnage
- Beam: 28 ft 4 in (8.6 m)
- Depth of hold: 14 ft 2 in (4.3 m)
- Propulsion: Sail
- Sail plan: Full-rigged ship
- Armament: 38 guns of various weights of shot

Nonsuch was a 32-gun fourth-rate of the English Navy, built by Peter Pett at Deptford Dockyard and launched in 1646 as part of the 1646 Programme Group. She was in the Parliamentary force during the English Civil War, then the Commonwealth Navy and was incorporated into the Royal Navy after the Restoration in 1660. During her time in the Commonwealth Navy she partook in the Battles of Kentish Knock, Portland, the Gabbard and Scheveningen. She was wrecked at Gibraltar on 3 December 1664.

Nonsuch was the second English warship to receive that name, since it was used for a 44-gun galleon named Philip and Mary built in 1556, rebuilt in 1584 and renamed Nonpareil, then rebuilt again in 1603 and renamed Nonsuch, and finally ordered to be sold in November 1645.

== Construction and specifications ==
She was ordered in December 1645 to be built at Deptford Dockyard under the guidance of Master Shipwright Peter Pett. She was launched in 1646, and was somewhat larger than the Assurance and Adventure built in the same year. Her known dimensions were 98 feet 0 inches (29.9 metres) keel length as reported for tonnage, breadth 28 feet 4 inches (8.6 metres), and depth in hold 14 feet 2 inches (4.3 metres). The tonnage was 41844/94 tons. There were different tonnages reported at various dates, an indication that the Nonsuch was originally intended to be 389 tons, signifying a breadth of 27 feet 4 inches (8.3 metres), but she was significantly girdled later on, to an eventual 518 tons, signifying a final breadth of 31 feet 6 inches (9.6 metres).

Her actual armament may have been slightly greater than in the Assurance and Adventure. As built she carried 34 guns, probably ten culverins (Note: A culverin was a gun of 4,500 pounds with a 5.5-inch bore firing a 17.5-pound shot with a 12-pound powder charge.) and ten demi-culverins (Note: A demi-culverin was a gun of 3,400 pounds with a four-inch bore firing a 9.5-pound shot with an eight-pound powder charge.) on the main deck, and four more demi-culverins and ten sakers on the quarterdeck, (Note: A sacar or saker was a gun of 1,400 pounds with a 3.5-inch bore firing a 5.5-pound shot with a 5.5-pound powder charge.) but another four guns (probably sakers) were added by 1652, by which time a continuous upper deck had been formed by joining the forecastle and quarterdeck. Another 2 guns were added in 1653, to give a total of 40.

== Commissioned service ==
=== Service in the English Civil War ===
She was commissioned in 1646 for service with the Parliamentary forces under Captain William Thomas for service in the Winter Guard through 1647. She was in the Irish Sea in the spring 1647. Later in 1647 she was under the command of Captain Richard Willoughby serving in the English Channel. She then was assigned to Warwick's Fleet at the Downs in September 1648. She participated in the blockade of Kinsale, Ireland in 1649.

=== Service in the Commonwealth Navy ===
In 1650 she was under Captain John Mildmay for service on the west coast, then she went to the Mediterranean with Penn's squadron in 1651. At the Battle of Kentish Knock she was a member of Robert Blake's Fleet of sixty-eight ships on 28 September 1652. In late 1652 she came under command of Captain Thomas Penrose. At the Battle off Portland she was a member of Robert Blake's Fleet of eighty-four ships from 18 to 20 February 1653. This British victory secured control over the English Channel. The Dutch lost eight warships and forty merchant vessels. In the Battle of the Gabbard she was a member of Blue Squadron, Centre Division, still under the command of Penrose, on 2/3 June 1653. The British were victorious on the first day. When Admiral Tromp attempted to attack again on the 3rd he withdrew when a squadron of eighteen ships arrived under the command of Robert Blake. This fight was followed by the Battle of Scheveningen where she was a member of Blue Squadron, Centre Division on 31 July 1653. In 1656/57 she was under Captain John Wooters with Robert Blake's Fleet. In 1660 she was under Captain Ambrose Smith until he died then Captain John Parker on 27 March 1661. He was still in command for the Restoration of Charles II.

=== Service after the Restoration 1661 ===
With Captain Parker in Command she sailed with the Earl of Sandwich's Squadron to Tangiers. She was with Sir John Lambert's squadron in the Mediterranean during the winter of 1661/62. On 19 March 1664 she was under the command of Captain Nicholas Parker with Sir Thomas Allin's squadron in the Mediterranean. Captain Philip Bacon took command on 4 November 1664.

== Loss ==
The Nonsuch was wrecked (with all hands lost) in a storm at Gibraltar on 3 December 1664, along with the Phoenix.
