= English ship Phoenix (1647) =

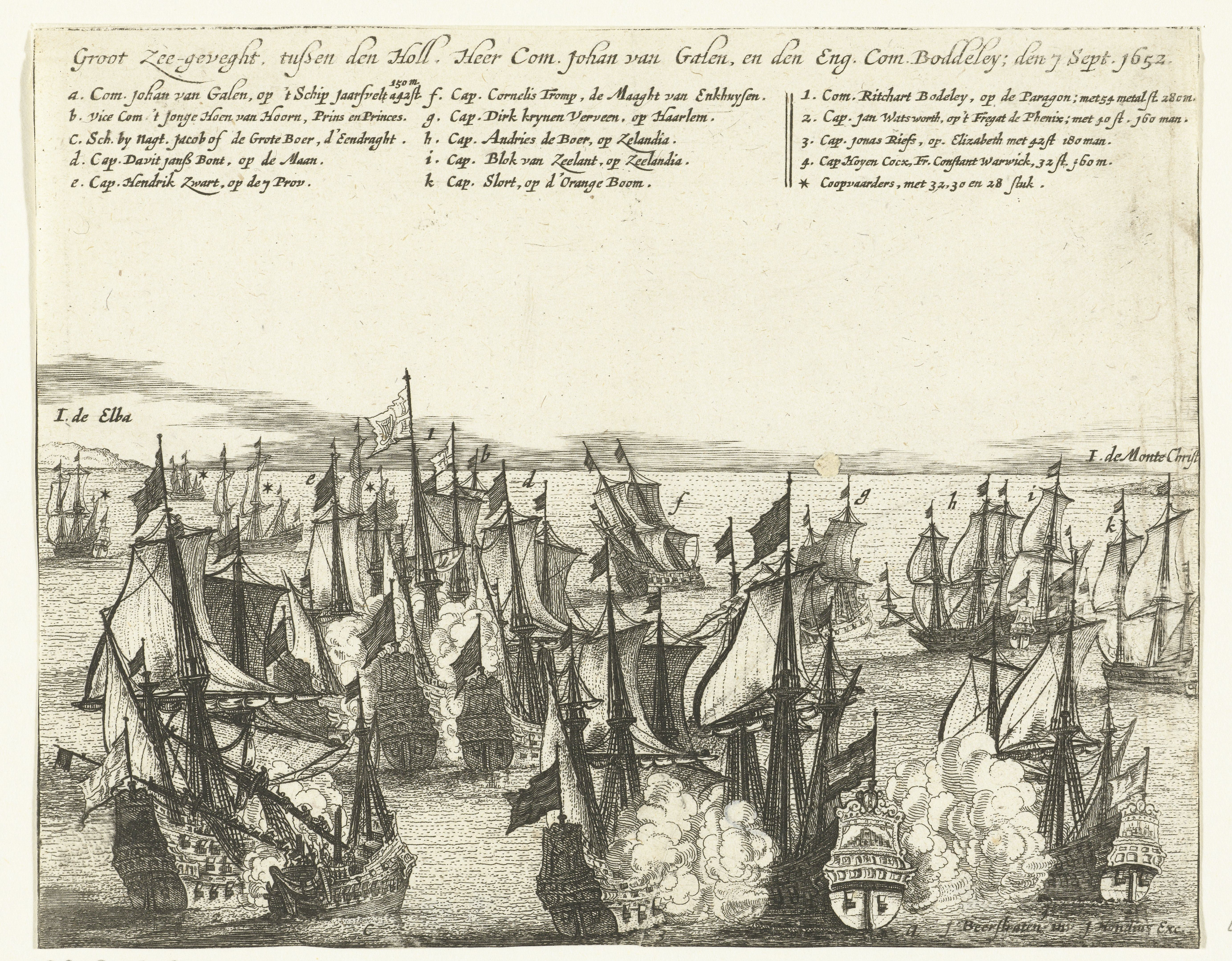
- Phoenix (bottom left) at the Battle of Elba between the Staatse fleet under Van Galen and the English fleet, under the command of Richard Badiley in 1652.

History

Commonwealth of England
- Name: Phoenix
- Builder: Peter Pett II, Woolwich
- Launched: 1647
- Commissioned: 1647
- Honours and awards: Scheveningen 1653

History

England
- Name: Phoenix
- Acquired: May 1660
- Fate: Wrecked at Gibraltar on 3 December 1664

General characteristics
- Class & type: 38-gun fourth rate
- Tons burthen: 41472/94 bm
- Length: 96 ft 0 in (29.3 m) keel for tonnage
- Beam: 28 ft 6 in (8.7 m)
- Depth of hold: 14 ft 3 in (4.3 m)
- Sail plan: ship-rigged
- Complement: 150 – 1652; 160 – 1653; 130 – 1660; 150/130/100 - 1664
- Armament: 38/32 guns 1652; 40/32 1664

The Phoenix was a fourth rate of the Kingdom of England. Her initial commission was in the Parliamentary Naval Force during the English Civil War. During the First Dutch War she was taken by the Dutch at the Battle of Elba (or Montecristo), but was recaptured during the Battle of Leghorn by a boat attack. After being recommissioned she participated in the Battle of Scheveningen. She went to the Mediterranean in 1658 and remained there until wrecked in December 1664.

Phoenix was the third vessel in the English Navy to bear that name, since it was first used for a 20-gun galleass, purchased in 1545, rebuilt in 1558 and sold in 1573, and then re-used for another 20-gun ship built in 1613 which lasted until 1624.

== Construction and specifications ==
The Phoenix was one of four new frigates ordered by Parliament and built under the 1647 Programme (the others were the Dragon, Elizabeth and Tiger). She was built at Woolwich Dockyard on the River Thames under the guidance of Master Shipwright Peter Pett II, and was launched in 1647. Her dimensions were 96 feet 6 inches (29.4 metres) keel length with a breadth of 28 feet 6 inches (8.7 metres) and a depth in hold of 14 feet 3 inches (4.3 metres). Her builder's measurement tonnage was 41472/94 bm tons. Initially she was equipped with 38 guns in wartime and 32 guns in peacetime. In 1664 she carried 40 guns in wartime and 32 in peacetime. Her manning was 150 personnel in 1652 and rose to 160 a year later. By 1660 her manning had dropped to 130 personnel.

== Commissioned service ==
=== Service in the English Civil War and Commonwealth Navy ===
She was commissioned into the Parliamentary Naval Force under the command of Captain Owen Cox. She was with Warwick's Fleet in the Downs in September 1648. In 1649 she was under Captain Thomas Harrison for service in the Irish Sea.In 1650 she was under Captain William Brandley sailing with Popham's squadron off the Tagus she later joined Robert Blake's Squadron. Later in 1650 she was under Captain John Wadsworth as Flagship for Robert Blake in the Irish Sea followed by the Isle of Scilly in June 1651 followed by the Channel Islands in October. She sailed with Badiley's Squadron to the Mediterranean. Phoenix was captured by the 40-gun Dutch ship Eendracht off Elba in the Mediterranean during the Battle of Elba, on 28 August 1652 (O.S.)/6 September 1652 (N.S.), an action between the English squadron commanded by Richard Badiley and a Dutch squadron under Jan van Galen. She was retaken on 26 November 1652 by an attack by English small boats at Leghorn. She recommissioned under Captain Owen Cox again. She was in the Battle of Leghorn on 4 March 1653. She followed this by returning to Home Waters and then took part in the Battle of Scheveningen on 31 July 1653. Later in 1653 Captain Nicholas Foster took command and spent the winter of 1653/54 in the Sound. During 1656 to 1658 she was under the command of Captain Thomas Whetstone with Blake's Fleet. She returned home between July and November 1656. In 1658/59 she was under Captain Thomas Bunn sailing with Stoake's squadron in the Mediterranean.

=== Service after the Restoration May 1660 ===
In 1660 Captain Edward Nixon was in command. On 30 April 1663 she was under Captain Richard Utbar. On 16 September 1664 she was under the command of John Chicheley with Allin's squadron in the Mediterranean.

== Loss ==
She was wrecked on 3 December 1664 (along with the similar Nonsuch) during a storm in Gibraltar Bay while attempting to pass through the Straits of Gibraltar.
