= English ship Charles (1632) =

History

England
- Name: Charles (1632-49); Liberty (1649-50)
- Builder: Peter Pett, Woolwich
- Launched: 1632
- Fate: Wrecked, 1650

General characteristics
- Class & type: 44-gun second rank ship of the line
- Tons burthen: 810
- Length: 105 ft (32 m) (keel)
- Beam: 33 ft 7 in (10.24 m)
- Depth of hold: 16 ft 3 in (4.95 m)
- Sail plan: Full-rigged ship
- Armament: 44 guns of various weights of shot

Charles was a 44-gun second rank ship of the line of the English navy, built by Peter Pett at Woolwich and launched in 1632. Commissioned in 1636, Charles was renamed Liberty in 1649. In 1650, she ran aground near Harwich, Essex. Salvage efforts from 1655 to 1663 successfully recovered much of the ship's ordnance.

== Construction ==
On 15 September 1631, Charles I placed an order for three new major warships, of which Charles was one. This order was reduced to two ships in May 1632, and that October they were named Charles and Henrietta Maria after the king and queen. A further two ships (Unicorn and James) were ordered the following year.

Charles was built by Peter Pett at Woolwich Dockyard and launched in 1632. It was soon discovered that the ship was crank-sided, with a distinctive list to one side, and on 2 January 1635 it was ordered that she be returned to drydock for girdling.

== Career ==
Charles was commissioned in 1636 under Captain Thomas Kettleby, and initially assigned to the fleet under the command of Algernon Percy. Throughout her career she served under a number of captains, including Sir Henry Mainwaring, a former pirate who would later reach the rank of vice admiral.

Charles was renamed Liberty in 1649, following the execution of her namesake Charles I for treason in that same year. Also in 1649, Liberty served as the flagship first of General-at-Sea Edward Popham, and then of General-at-Sea Richard Deane.

She ran aground and was wrecked off Harwich, Essex in October 1650, under the command of Captain Edward Hall.

== Salvage ==
As Liberty had been wrecked in shallow coastal waters, it was believed possible for materials to be recovered. Initial salvage efforts in the years after Liberty's sinking recovered one of the guns.

In March 1655, the navy hired diver Robert Willis to carry out a more thorough salvage programme. Willis' first task was to locate the wreck, which was eventually achieved using a sweep of undersea drag lines.

Progress on recovering ordnance from the wreck was slow. In the first diving season, Willis recovered a single saker. By 1657, he had recovered three more sakers, a culverin, and a demi-cannon. In 1658 he retrieved an additional gun and two anchors. Work continued after the Stuart Restoration, after which the wreck was referred to by its original name of Charles. Work concluded in August 1663.
