= Battle of Weymouth =

Battle during the First English Civil War

Coordinates: 50°36′27″N 2°27′19″W

First Battle of Weymouth (The Crabchurch Conspiracy)
- Part of The First English Civil War
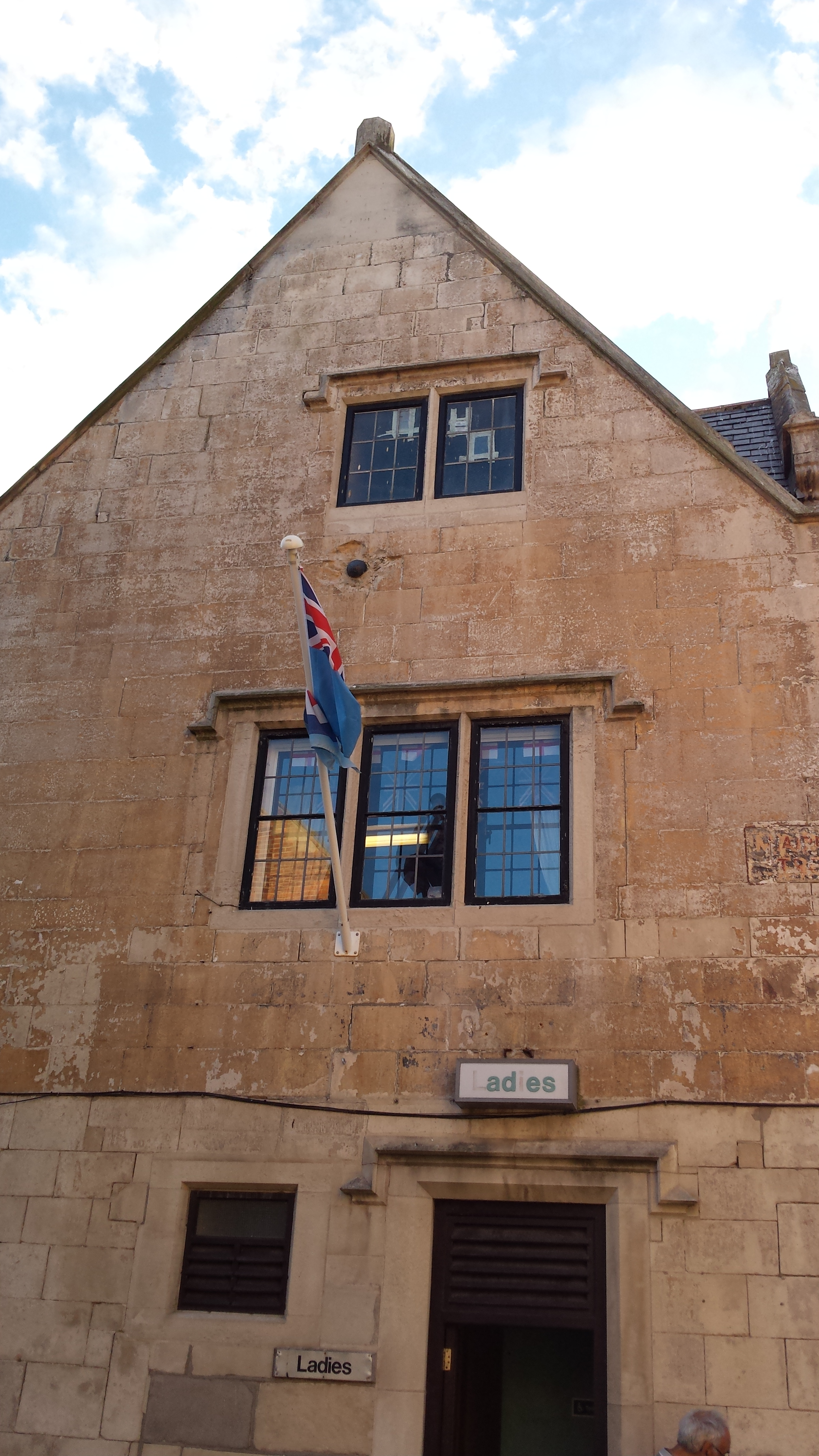
- RAFA Club with an embedded cannonball
Date	9 February 1645
Location	Weymouth, Dorset
Result	Royalist victory
Territorial changes	Weymouth was lost to the Royalists

Belligerents
Royalists	Parliamentarians

Commanders and leaders
Lewis Dyve; William Hastings	William Sydenham

Strength
1,500	1,200

Second Battle of Weymouth
- Part of the First English Civil War
Date	27 February 1645
Location	Weymouth, Dorset
Result	Parliamentarian victory
Territorial changes	Weymouth was regained by the Parliamentarians

Belligerents
Royalists	Parliamentarians

Commanders and leaders
Lewis Dyve; James Heane; Lord Goring	William Sydenham

Strength
6,500	1,200

The Battle of Weymouth and the associated Crabchurch Conspiracy occurred in 1645, during the First English Civil War, when several royalist plotters within the twin towns of Weymouth and Melcombe on the Dorset coast conspired to deliver the ports back into the control of King Charles I.

== Background ==
=== State of the war in the West Country ===
At the outbreak of the First English Civil War in 1642, Dorset was divided in its loyalties; broadly speaking, the south of the county and the larger towns favoured the Parliamentarians, while those in the countryside and the north of the county were more likely to support the Royalist cause. Sir Walter Erle, a local Member of Parliament with strong Calvinist views, secured the ports of Weymouth, Lyme Regis and Wareham, along with Portland Castle, for the Parliamentarians during the build-up to the fighting. Dorset was a relatively inconsequential county of itself; it had no large cities, did not have significant industry, and though it had the aforementioned ports, none were major naval or trading bases. The fighting in the West Country was described as having "disproportionate significance", and armies on both sides travelled through Dorset to reach the main areas of fighting around Devon, fighting and plundering as they did so.

Control of the West Country fluctuated. By the end of 1643, most of the area was under Royalist control; only Plymouth, Poole and Lyme Regis held out against them, but the Earl of Essex swept through the region in the summer of 1644, claiming most of Somerset and Devon for parliament. He then over-stretched himself and was trapped in Cornwall, isolated from reinforcements. His army suffered a heavy defeat at the Battle of Lostwithiel in September, and scattered back into Dorset, leaving only Plymouth and Taunton as significant Parliamentarian controlled towns in Cornwall, Devon and Somerset. Within Dorset, Lyme Regis, Poole and Weymouth remained under parliamentary command.

=== Weymouth ===
Weymouth, although protected by earthworks and ditches, was generally undefendable against any serious effort to take it. The harbour was well-protected by Sandsfoot Castle, but the town itself had little in the way of serious fortifications. The town had previously been taken by the Royalists in August 1643, before being forced to surrender by the Earl of Essex in 1644. William Sydenham was appointed governor, and took his Regiment of Foot to garrison the town. By the autumn, Nothe Fort and Chapel Fort had been constructed, along with more earthworks around the town.

== First battle ==
=== Prelude ===
The regimental preacher, Peter Ince, said of the defences that "we were in as sweet a quiet and security as any garrison in the Kingdom; no enemy near us but one at Portland, and that not very considerable, being but about 300 or 400 men". Matters were so peaceful that a meeting of the town council at the end of January 1645 was primarily concerned with the cleanliness of the town, and resolved that all the dirt in the streets should be piled up and removed.

Within Weymouth there remained Royalist sympathisers who had been plotting to deliver the town to the King's forces. They were led by Fabian Hodder, who recruited supporters to his cause by paying them £5. When Hodder was prepared to move, he had his wife, Anne, write a letter to Sir Lewis Dyve in Sherborne. The letter was delivered by Elizabeth Wall, a widow.

=== Battle ===
At midnight on 9 February 1645, a small force of Royalist soldiers were ferried across the narrow strait (where the Portland Bridge Road, A354 now crosses) from Portland Castle. They linked up with the sympathisers in the town, who wore white handkerchiefs on their arms and used the password "Crabchurch" to identify themselves. The incursion caught the Parliamentarian garrison by surprise, and successfully captured both the Chapel and Nothe forts. Recovering from their initial surprise, the Parliamentarians rallied and launched counter-attacks. The strength of the forts was such that despite their smaller numbers, the Royalists were able to hold them until the following day, when Dyve and the governor of Portland Castle, William Hastings, arrived with 1,500 men to clear out any resistance and garrison the town for the King. They also tried to assassinate Sydenham, but were unsuccessful – although Sydenham lost his brother Francis in the initial assault. This was known locally as the Crabchurch Conspiracy.

The defending Parliamentarians, under William Sydenham, took refuge in nearby Melcombe, which was at the time only connected to Weymouth proper by a drawbridge. The two sides began to bombard each other from across what is now Radipole Lake and the old harbour.

== Second battle ==
In order to retake Weymouth, Parliament dispatched the warship Constant Reformation under William Batten, with 200 sailors from Poole, and 100 cavalry under James Heane who had made their way through enemy lines and met up with Parliamentarians in Melcombe. In total, there were 1,200 Parliamentarians in Melcombe, facing against a numerically stronger, but less experienced and thus weaker force of 1,500 Royalists in Weymouth.

A 4,500-strong Royalist army under Lord Goring was based in nearby Dorchester, but did not move to intervene in the internecine bombardment. On 27 February, Sydenham saw his chance, and captured a Royalist supply convoy on its way to Weymouth from Dorchester. When Dyve moved troops to recapture the convoy, the Parliamentarians stormed the bridge with 150 musketeers, taking the town, and eventually both the forts.

Goring immediately marched down to retake the town with a combined force of 6,500 men - but the attack was repulsed by Sydenham and Batten. Those royalists involved in the conspiracy were, for the main part, executed.

== General references ==
- Bowles Barrett, W. (1910). "Weymouth and Melcombe Regis in the Time of the Great Civil War". Proceedings of the Dorset Natural History and Antiquarian Field Club. 31. Dorchester: Dorset County Chronicle Printing Works. OCLC 223643405.
