= English ship Happy Entrance =

English navy ship

History

England
- Name: Happy Entrance
- Builder: Burrell, Deptford
- Launched: 1619
- Fate: Burnt, 1658

General characteristics
- Class & type: Middling ship
- Length: 96 ft (29 m) (keel)
- Beam: 32 ft 2 in (9.80 m)
- Depth of hold: 13 ft 1 in (3.99 m)
- Sail plan: Full-rigged ship

Happy Entrance (Note: The 'HMS' prefix was not used until the middle of the Eighteenth Century, but is sometimes applied retrospectively) was a middling ship of the English navy, built by Andrew Burrell at Deptford and launched in 1619. King James I originally named the ship Buckingham's Entrance to mark the appointment of his favourite, George Villiers, 1st Duke of Buckingham, as Lord High Admiral of England. But she was subsequently renamed.

During the Second English Civil War she served on the side of Parliament under the command of Richard Badiley. In April 1649, a party of seamen from Happy Entrance captured and burnt the Royalist ship Antelope at Hellevoetsluis in the Netherlands. Antelope was then over 100 years old and was a veteran of the 1588 campaign against the Spanish Armada.

Happy Entrance was present at the Battle of the Gabbard on the 2–3 June 1653, as part of the Blue Squadron. She was under the command of Captain Richard Newbery.

Happy Entrance was destroyed by fire in 1658.
