= Richard Badiley =

English admiral (c. 1616–1656)

Vice-Admiral Richard Badiley
- Born: c. 1616
- Died: 7 or 11 August 1656 (aged 39–40); Milk Yard, Wapping
- Burial place: St John-at-Wapping
- Military career
- Allegiance: England
- Branch: Royal Navy
- Rank: Vice-Admiral
- Commands: Happy Entrance; Paragon; Downs Station
- Conflicts: First Anglo-Dutch War

Vice-Admiral Richard Badiley (c. 1616 – 7 or 11 August 1656) was an English naval officer. He saw service during the First Anglo-Dutch War.

== Early service ==
Richard Badiley was a merchant, ship owner, and ship captain, probably related to several Badileys who appeared in Trinity House lists of shipmasters in the 1620s. He first appeared as master's mate of the Increase at Cádiz in 1636, when he was described as aged twenty and of Wapping. He served as master of the Advance and Peregrine on trading voyages to the eastern Mediterranean in the period 1637–45 and fought actions with Turkish corsairs in 1637, 1640, and 1644. He won particular fame for one such encounter, where with just 44 seamen, he defended his ships from 500 Turks. He carried out trading voyages to North America as well, and by 1648 had become a younger brother of Trinity House. By 1654, Badiley was described as a freeman of the Fishmongers' Company. He continued his commercial activities and leased several of his ships to the state. He did not take a direct part in the Civil War but had strong Puritan leanings and associations, was known to have supported parliament, and pressed for freedom and religious reforms.

His early service under the parliament is unknown, whether on shore or afloat. His name does not appear in any published list of the parliamentary fleet through May 1648. In April 1649, he was captain of the Happy Entrance and commander-in-chief of the fleet in the Downs, specially charged with appointing and regulating the convoys of merchant ships and proposing measures to the council of state for capturing or destroying Antelope, one of the ships which had gone over to the Prince of Wales, and was lying at Helvoetsluys. The attempt was a success, and Antelope was destroyed by a party of seamen from Happy Entrance, commanded by her lieutenant, Stephen Rose, to whom a gold medal and a gratuity of 48l were awarded as encouragement.

On 1 March 1650, he sailed for Portugal, as vice-admiral of Robert Blake's expedition against Prince Rupert. At one point, having been dispatched with eight ships to revictual at Cádiz, he found and fought six French men-of-war. He sailed for England on 14 October, convoying several rich Portuguese prizes. In the summer of 1651, he served as vice-admiral to Blake in the Downs, guarding against a possible attack to support the Scots' invasion. Following the Scots' defeat at the Battle of Worcester, he joined Blake with the reduction of Jersey before sailing in the Paragon in December, escorting a convoy to the Mediterranean.

== Anglo-Dutch War ==
On 14 February 1652, Badiley overhauled an Algerine corsair and had the greater force taken out of her all the English captives. He then passed on to Zante, to Smyrna, and so back towards Leghorn, where, having had news of the war with the Dutch Republic, he hoped to effect a junction with Commodore Henry Appleton.

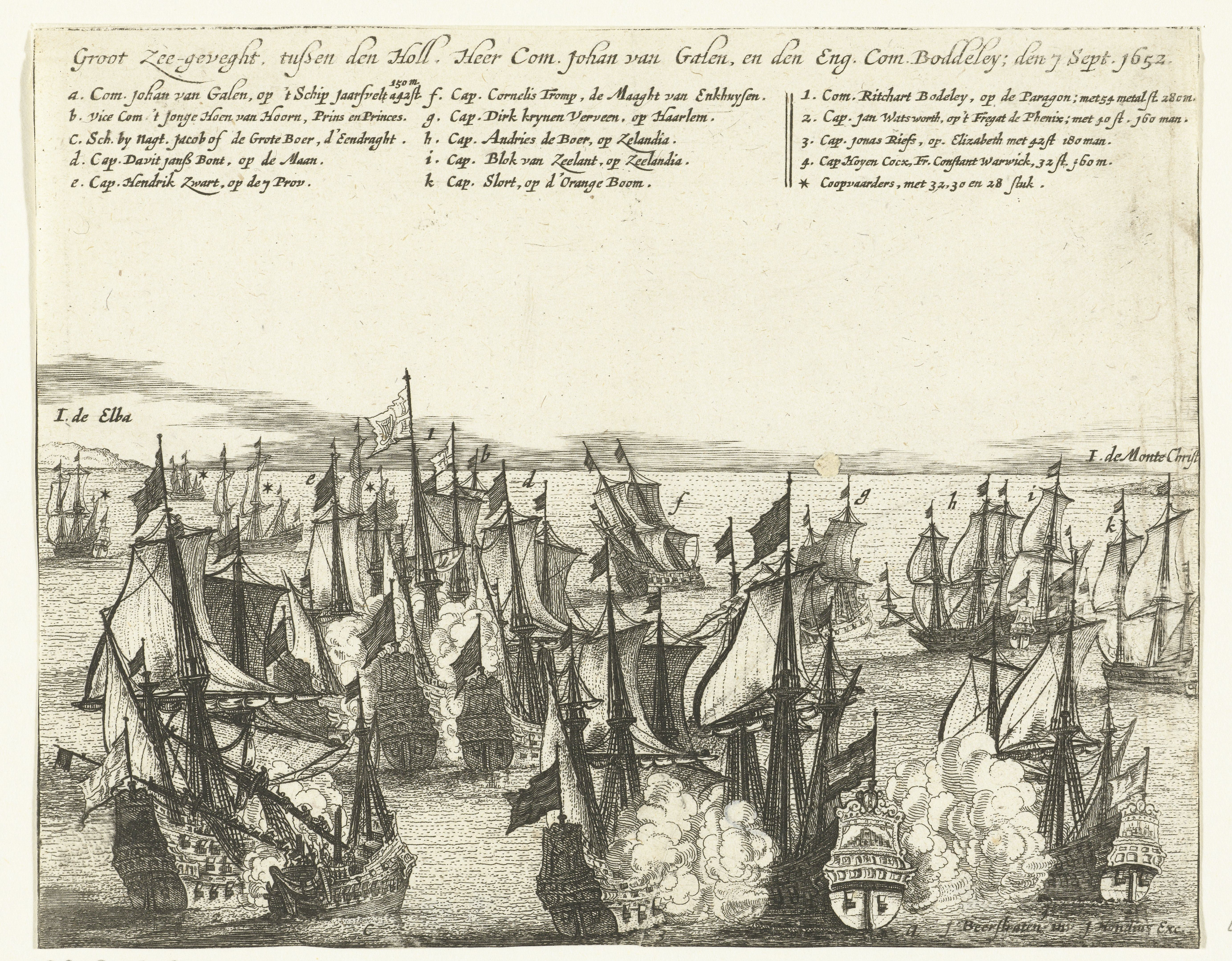
Sea battle near Elba between the Staatse fleet under Van Galen and the English fleet under Badiley, 1652

Appleton could not or would not stir to meet him, and the Dutch, leaving two ships, which proved sufficient to hold Appleton in check, turned to attack Badiley, who had only four ships with which to oppose the ten or eleven now brought against him; leading to the Battle of Elba. Off the island of Elba, the fight began about four o'clock in the afternoon of 27 August 1652 and continued until nightfall. The English ships, and the Paragon more especially, were singly superior to any of the Dutch who swarmed around them and endeavored to carry them by force of numbers. The fighting was mostly hand-to-hand or at a very short range. 'We discharged,' wrote Badiley, 'that day from this ship (the Paragon) 800 pieces of great ordnance, which must have done no small execution, having sometimes two of the enemy's best men-of-war aboard, and all the rest within pistol and musket shot of us' (31 August) The Paragon had 26 killed and 57 wounded, out of a complement of 250; had received fifty shots in the hull, many of them between wind and water, and her masts and rigging cut to pieces. Badiley thought and said that the other ships might and should have taken some of the pressure off the Paragon, but in fact, they were severally as hard-pressed as the Paragon and had not her size and strength. They fired away almost all their ammunition, and towards evening the Dutch succeeded in capturing the Phoenix. And so the fight ended; the English went the next day into Porto Longone in Elba. The Dutch contemplated attacking them there and offered the governor a large sum of money to permit them. He, however, refused it and allowed Badiley to strengthen his position by throwing up some batteries and landing some of his ship's guns.

Towards the end of October Badiley received orders from home to take command of the squadron at Leghorn, and, crossing over, he concerted measures with Appleton for the recapture of the Phoenix, the success of which led to the Grand Duke's ordering the English to quit the port. This they did, and were, with one exception, all captured by the Dutch, before Badiley, who was in the offing, but to leeward, could offer any assistance. After this, there was nothing further to be done but to provide for the safety of the remaining ships, and Badiley accordingly went down the Mediterranean, and so home, arriving in the Downs in the early days of May 1653. His men, he wrote, were very turbulent and mutinous, refused all compromise, and were determined to go into the river to be paid off. They obtained their demands. 'We are paying off the Straits fleet,' wrote Commissioner Pett from Chatham on 1 June; 'they are the rudest people I ever saw. I hope the ringleaders will be called to account.' About 120 of them were, however, immediately shipped off to join the main fleet with Blake. 'I have had no small trouble to quiet them,' wrote Major Bourne on 4 June; 'they are so enraged that they are sent away. I have promised them that as soon as the exigency of affairs permits they shall enjoy the liberty granted them.

== Rear-Admiral ==
The campaign in the Mediterranean had ended so disastrously, and Appleton was so vehement in his accusations, that Badiley's conduct was formally inquired into. Badiley wrote two pamphlets on the mishap, and thereafter the charges recoiled on Appleton, and Badiley was not only cleared of all blame but was on 7 December promoted to be rear-admiral of the fleet, a rank equivalent then to what was afterward known as admiral of the blue squadron. He served for a few months in the Vanguard and was then transferred to the Andrew, in which, as second to Blake, he went to the Mediterranean, and was engaged in the reduction of Tunis and the liberation of English captives along the northern coast of Africa. Andrew came home and was paid off in the autumn of 1655.

== Later life ==
In the summer of 1656, Badiley superseded John Lawson as Commander-in-Chief, the Downs. This ended his service. In April 1657, he was living at Milk Yard, Wapping, in poor health, and he died there 'of an ulcer' on 7 or 11 August. He was buried on 14 August at St John-at-Wapping.

William Badiley, presumably his elder brother, was for many years master attendant at Woolwich.

== Bibliography ==
- Baumber, Michael (2004). Oxford Dictionary of National Biography : in association with the British Academy : From the earliest times to the year 2000: Robert Blake. Vol. VI. Oxford University Press. ISBN 0-19-861356-3.
- Capp, Bernard (2004). Oxford dictionary of national biography : in association with the British Academy : from the earliest times to the year 2000: Richard badiley. Vol. III. Oxford University Press. pp. 204–205. ISBN 0-19-861411-X.
- Clowes, William Laird (1897–1903). The Royal Navy, a history from the earliest times to the present. Vol. II. London: S. Low, Marston.
- Gardiner, Samuel Rawson (1897). History of the commonwealth and protectorate, 1649-1660. Vol. II. Longmans, Green and Company.
- Laughton, John Knox (1885). Stephen, Leslie (ed.). Dictionary of national biography Badiley, Richard. Vol. II. New York: Macmillan. pp. 388–389.
- David, Plant (2010). "Blake in the Mediterranean". British Civil Wars Project (BCW).
- "Badiley, Richard" . Dictionary of National Biography. London: Smith, Elder & Co. 1885–1900.
