= 1646 Programme Group =

Class of ships

Class overview
- Name: 1646 Programme (Group of English warships)
- Builders: Woolwich Dockyard; Deptford Dockyard
- Operators: Kingdom of England; Commonwealth Of England; Royal Navy
- Preceded by: 1637 Group
- Succeeded by: 1647 Programme
- Built: 1645 - 1646
- In service: 1646 - 1709
- Completed: 3
- Lost: 2
- Retired: 1

General characteristics
- Type: 34-gun Fourth Rate
- Sail plan: ship-rigged
- Armament: 32 to 34 guns initially, later up to 42 guns

The 1646 Programme of new warships nominally for the English Navy Royal of King Charles I were ordered during the English Civil War by the Parliamentary side in late 1645. With Parliament on 14 October 1645 approving the disposal of six elderly ships, instructions were issued for the speedy building of other vessels in their place. The Admiralty Committee was instructed on 4 November to "take care for the setting up ... and building of so many ships or frigates as they see fit", and on 2 December it ordered a model to be constructed in order "to build three frigates, (each) to carry 32 or 34 guns".

== Designs, specifications and reconstruction ==
Orders placed later in December with Master Shipwright Peter Pett (Snr) to build two frigates (Assurance and Nonsuch) at Deptford Dockyard and with his son Peter Pett (Jnr) to build one frigate (the Adventure) at Woolwich Dockyard. The two Master Shipwrights were individually responsible for the respective designs for the three vessels and for supervising their construction. While all three would be classed as Fourth rates and would each have eleven pairs of gunports on their gundeck (and five or six pairs on their quarterdecks), their individual dimensions and armament differed and are listed in the articles on the individual vessels.

All three frigates were built as single-decked warships, with their main battery on the sole gundeck, with eleven pairs of gunports carrying a mixture of culverins and demi-culverins. Above this they each had a long quarterdeck with either five or six pairs of ports for a mixture of semi-culverins and sakers, but lacked any forecastle. The latter omission was soon corrected, with a forecastle (as an elevated structure over the forward part of the gundeck, but not carrying any guns) being built to "add very much to their strength". During 1649 a small poop was added to surmount the quarterdeck, and over the next couple of years a spar deck was added above the gundeck. Initially this did not carry any guns, but by 1654 this had altered to a full upper deck bearing an upper battery of guns, with the poop becoming a new quarterdeck and with a new quarterdeck above the upper deck. They thus became two-deckers (although the upper deck remained without guns or gunports in the waist), and by June 1660 each of the three was established with 34 guns and 120 men (except for the Assurance with 32 guns and 115 men, just like the Constant Warwick).

== Ships of the 1646 Programme ==
As with most vessels of this time period only the years of their launch are available. All three ships served the navy of the Commonwealth of England from 1646 to 1660, when they became part of the Royal Navy following the Stuart Restoration.

Name	Builder	Launch year	Remarks
Adventure	Woolwich Dockyard	1646	Rebuilt as a 40-gun Fifth Rate at Chatham Dockyard in 1691; Captured by a French squadron off Montserrat on 1 March 1709
Assurance	Deptford Dockyard	1646	Reduced to Fifth Rate 1690; Sold at Sheerness in 1698 to break up
Nonsuch	Deptford Dockyard	1646	Wrecked in a storm at Gibraltar on 3 December 1664
