= English ship Constant Warwick =

Ship of the line of the Royal Navy

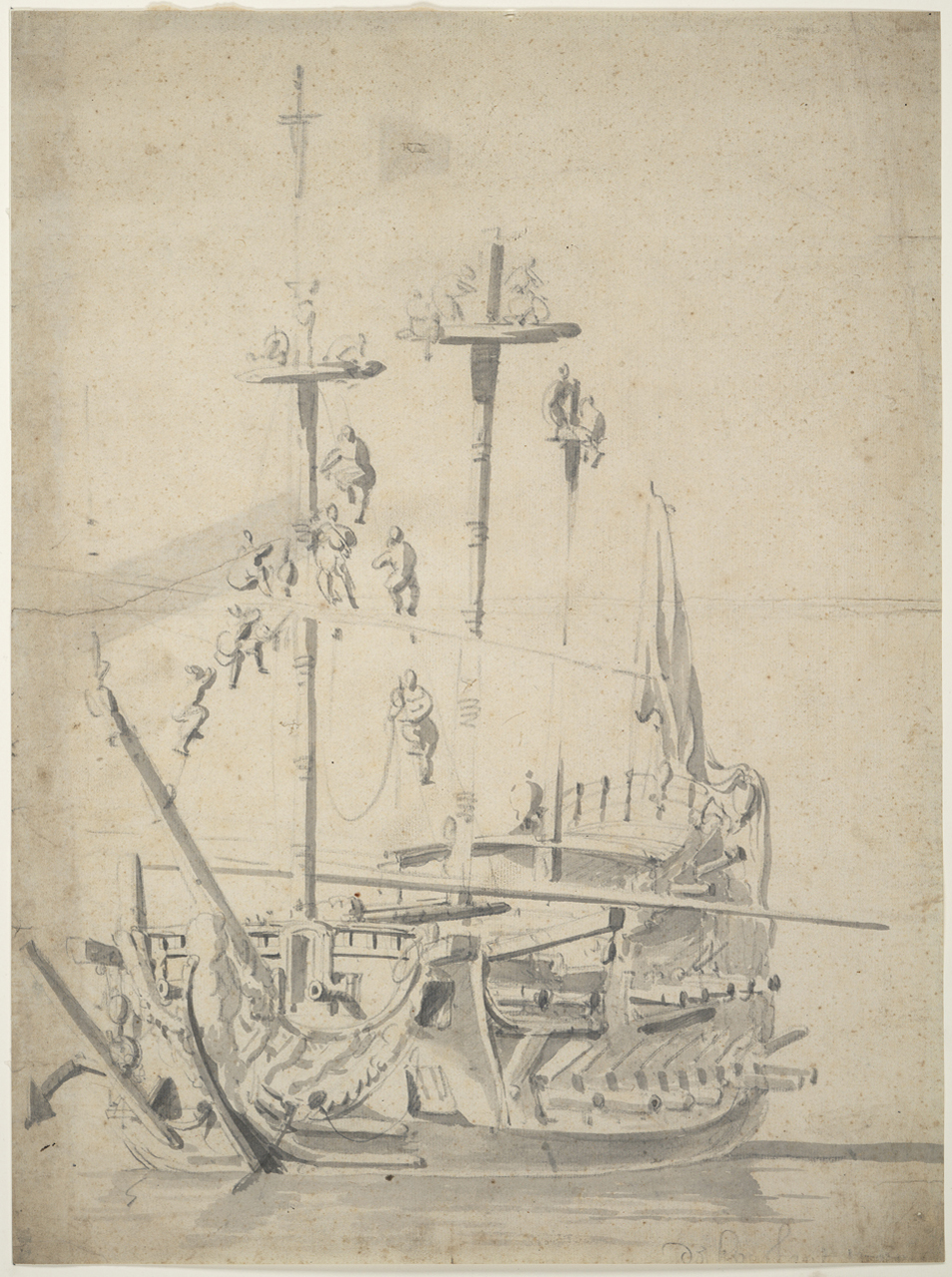
- The Constant Warwick, drawn by Willem van de Velde the Elder

History

Commonwealth of England
- Name: Constant Warwick
- Builder: Peter Pett I, Ratcliff
- Launched: 1645
- Acquired: 20 January 1649
- Commissioned: 1650
- Honours and awards: Livorno 1653; Scheveningen 1653

Kingdom of England
- Name: Constant Warwick
- Acquired: May 1660
- Honours and awards: Montecristo 1652; Shooneveld 1673; Beachy Head 1690
- Captured: 12 July 1691
- Fate: Captured by the French

General characteristics as built
- Class & type: 32-gun fourth-rate
- Tons burthen: 315 48/94 bm tons
- Length: 85 ft 0 in (25.91 m) (keel)
- Beam: 26 ft 5 in (8.05 m)
- Depth of hold: 13 ft 2 in (4.01 m)
- Propulsion: Sails
- Sail plan: ship-rigged
- Complement: 140 in 1653; 150/140/115 later in career
- Armament: 32 guns in 1653 and 32 in 1666; 12 culverins (LD); 12 demi-culverins (6 LD and 6 UD); 10 sakers (UD)

General characteristics by 1660
- Class & type: 32-gun fourth-rate
- Tons burthen: 341 22/94 bm tons
- Length: 88 ft (27 m) (keel)
- Beam: 27 ft 0 in (8.23 m)
- Depth of hold: 12 ft 8 in (3.86 m)
- Propulsion: Sails
- Sail plan: ship-rigged
- Armament: 34 guns

General characteristics after 1666 rebuild
- Class & type: 42-gun fourth-rate ship of the line
- Tons burthen: 379 75/94 bm tons
- Length: 90 ft (27 m) (keel)
- Beam: 28 ft 2 in (8.59 m)
- Depth of hold: 12 ft 8 in (3.86 m)
- Propulsion: Sails
- Sail plan: Full-rigged ship
- Armament: 42 guns - comprising 20 demi-culverins, 18 sakers (6-pounder guns) and 4 light sakers (5-pounder guns)

Constant Warwick was originally a 32-gun privateer, built in 1645 as a private venture between the Earl of Warwick and Sir William Batten and intended to operate as a privateer. Hired for service in the Parliamentarian navy during the First English Civil War, her captain William Batten defected to the Royalists during the 1648 Second English Civil War. After her crew mutinied in November 1648, she returned to England and was purchased by Parliament for the Commonwealth Navy on 20 January 1649.

Described as an "incomparable sailer", she was noted for her sharpness and fine lines, and was considered by some as the first true frigate of the Royal Navy (although the Expedition and Providence of 1637, which predated her by eight years and originally described as "pinnaces", were certainly categorised as frigates by the time of the English Civil War). Mainly used for patrolling, she was captured by the French in 1691.

Constant Warwick was the only ship of the Royal Navy to bear that name.

== Construction and specifications ==
She was started as a private venture contracted to Peter Pett I of Ratcliffe and launched in 1645. Her dimensions were keel 85 feet 0 inches (25.9 metres) keel for tonnage with a breadth of 26 feet 5 inches (8.1 metres) and a depth of hold of 13 feet 2 inches (4.0 metres). Her tonnage was 315 48/94 tons. She was remeasured at a later date and her dimensions changed to keel 88 feet 0 inches (26.8 metres) keel for tonnage with a breadth of 27 feet 0 inches (8.2 metres) and a depth of hold of 12 feet 0 inches (3.7 metres). Her tonnage was 341 22/94 tons.

Her gun armament in 1653 was 32 guns, and in 1666 was 34 guns, consisting of twelve culverins (Note: The culverin was a gun of 4,500 pounds with a 5.5-inch bore firing a 17.5-pound shot with a twelve-pound powder charge) and eight demi-culverins (Note: The demi-culverin was a gun of 3,400 pounds with a four-inch bore firing a 9.5-pound shot with an eight-pound powder charge) on the upper deck, plus four more demi-culverins and ten sakers (Note: The sacar or saker was a gun of 1,400 pounds with a 3.5-inch bore firing a 4-pound shot with a 4-pound powder charge) on the upper deck.

She was completed with a first cost of £1,982.10.0d (Note: The cost accounting for inflation of approximately £407,400 in reference to today) or 302 tons @ £6.10.0d (Note: The cost accounting for inflation of approximately £1,300 in reference to today) per ton.

== Description ==
Mr Samuel Pepys states,

"The Constant-Warwick was the first frigate built in England. She was built in 1649, by Mr. Peter Pett, for a privateer for the Earl of Warwick...Pett took his model of a frigate from a French frigate he had seen in the Thames; as his son Sir Phineas Pett, acknowledged to me."

However, Pepys's assertion that "Constant Warwick was the first frigate built in England" neglects the building in 1637 of the Expedition and Providence at Bermondsey (albeit that they were initially classed as "pinnaces"). Research by William M. James states,

"Constant-Warwick was built in 1646, at Ratcliffe...(she was) of 380 to 400 tons, and mounted 26 guns; consisting of 18 light demi-culverins or short 9-pounders, on the main deck, six light sakers, or short 6-pounders, on what was virtually the quarterdeck, and two minions, on what, as being no greater extent than was requisite for a roof to the chief officer's cabin, may be called a poop...The deck on which the sakers are mounted is really a whole deck, reaching from stem to stern; but the bulwark, or barricade, commences only where that of the modern quarterdeck does, at the after side of the gangway-entrance...(she is) well formed in her lower body, lightly but handsomely ornamented in her upperworks, and rigged according to the most approved plan of the day...The first list, in which the Constant-Warwick appears as a national ship, is one of 1652. There she classes as a fifth-rate, or 28 guns. In another list of the same year, her guns are stated at 32; a difference to be explained, perhaps, by one being the lowest, the other the highest, number of guns assigned to the ship in her new employ"

James continues,

"Our suspicion that this had taken place (overfitting re: armament) was excited by seeing the name of the Constant-Warwick, as one of the six fourth-rated 42-gun ships...There the ship, having her two bow-ports filled, carries 20, instead of 18 demi-culverins on, what is now, in truth, the first gundeck; and, having her quarterdeck bulwark continued forward on each side to her stem, readily finds room for a second whole tier of guns."

== Commissioned service ==
=== English Civil War and Commonwealth Navy ===
She was commissioned in 1645 under Captain John Gilson, who would hold command until 1647. In April 1647 she sided with the Royalists, however, in November she defected to the Parliamentary Navy. In November 1647 she was under command of Captain Robert Dare. In 1649 she was under Captain Robert Moulton Jr. She captured the Royalist ship Charles in May 1649. The Charles was incorporated into the Parliament Navy as the Guinea. Following the capture she was assigned to the blockade of Kinsale, Ireland. In 1650 she sailed with Robert Blake's Fleet to the Tagus for the blockade of Lisbon in 1650. She returned to Home Waters for service in the Irish Sea in 1651. In 1651 she came under the command of Captain Owen Cox.

==== First Anglo-Dutch War ====
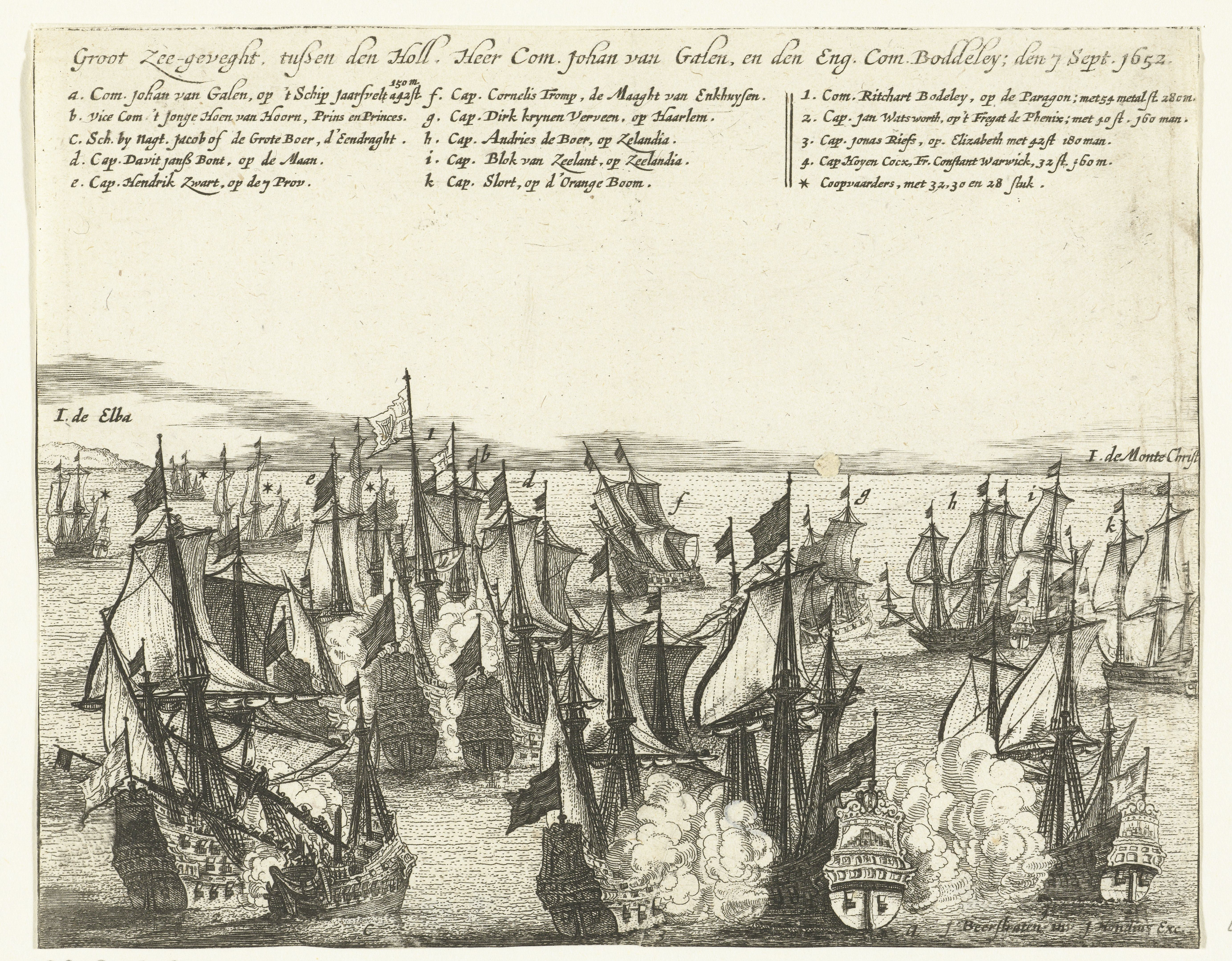
Constant Warwick at the Battle of Elba between the Staatse fleet under Van Galen and the English fleet, under the command of Richard Badiley in 1652

Captain Cox sailed with Badiley's Squadron and participated in the Battle of Montecristo on 28 August 1652. In 1653 she was under Captain Upshott with Appleton's Squadron at the Battle of Leghorne on 4 March 1653. Later in 1653 she was under Captain Richard Potter until 1656 for service in Home Waters. She was off the Dutch coast during the winter of 1653/54.

In 1657 She was under the command of Captain Robert Vessey.

=== After the Restoration May 1660 ===
Under Captain Vessey she was at Plymouth in June 1660. On 1 June 1661 she was under command of Captain Robert Kirby until 1 August 1663. She sailed to Tangier in 1662. She returned to Portsmouth and was laid up from 1663 until 1664 when it was decided to rebuild her.

=== Rebuild at Portsmouth 1664-66 ===
She was ordered rebuilt in April 1664 at Portsmouth Dockyard under the guidance of Master Shipwright John Tippets. She was taken in hand in early 1666 and launched on 21 April 1666. Her dimensions were keel 90 feet 0 inches (27.4 metres) keel for tonnage with a breadth of 28 feet 2 inches (8.6 metres) and a depth of hold of 12 feet 0 inches (3.7 metres). Her tonnage was 379 78/94 tons.

Her gun armament in 1666 was 34 guns and consisted of twelve culverins and six demi-culverins on the lower deck (LD), and six more demi-culverins and ten sakers on the upper deck. In 1677 her guns were changed to 42 wartime and 36 peacetime consisting of twenty demi-culverins on the lower deck (LD), eighteen sakers on the upper deck (UD) and four sakers on the quarterdeck (QD). In 1685 she had eighteen demi-culverins drakes on the lower deck, eighteen 6-pounder guns on the upper deck and four 3-pounder guns on the quarterdeck.

=== Service after Rebuild Portsmouth 1664-66 ===
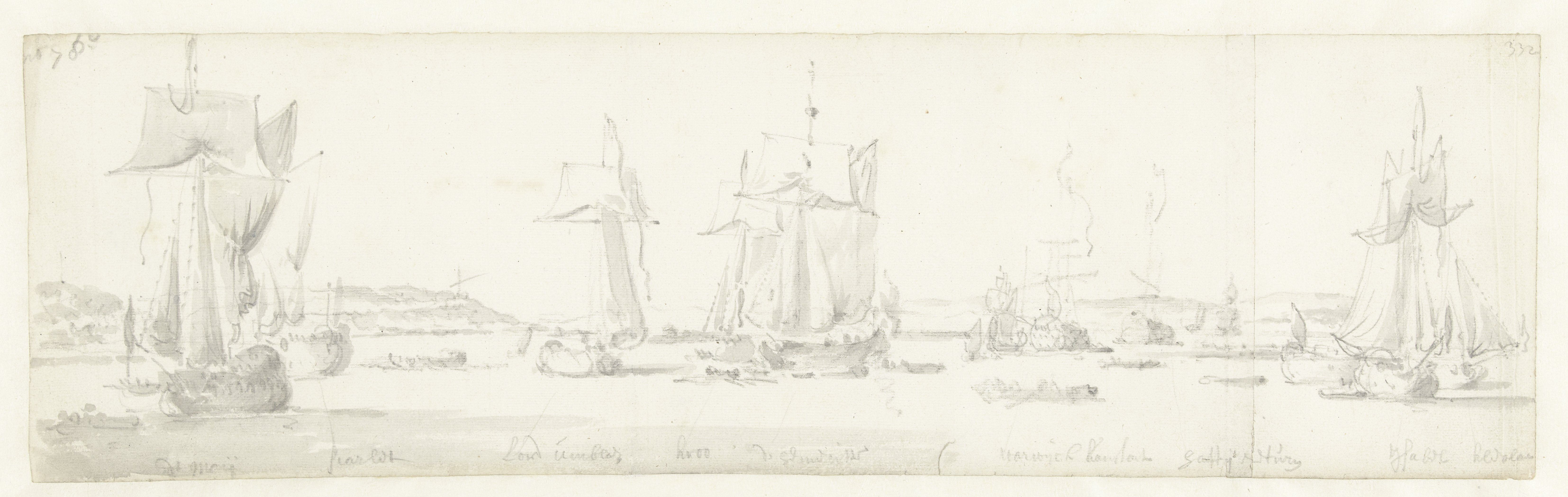
The Constant Warwick on the Thames near Sheerness and Chatham with king Charles II on board 27 August 1681

She was commissioned on 21 June 1666 under the command of Robert Ensome. She was in action against a Dutch privateer off the River Tagus near Lisbon in February 1667. Captain Ensome was mortally wounded during the action and died on 24 February. On 3 April 1667, Captain Arthur Herbert took command until 5 September 1668. On 1 April 1669 Captain John Waterworth took command and sailed with Sir Thomas Aliin's Squadron to the Mediterranean. Captain Waterworth remained in command until 28 January 1672.

==== Third Anglo-Dutch War ====
With the start of the Third Anglo-Dutch War she came under command of Captain Thomas Hamilton on 10 April 1672. She partook in both battles of Schooneveld as a member of Red Squadron on 28 May (first) and 4 June (second) 1672. Captain Count (Gustavus) Home took command on 24 June 1672 followed by Captain Joseph Harris on 2 June 1673. She was at the Battle of Texel on 11 August 1673.

With the end of the Third Anglo-Dutch War she sailed on an expedition to Cadiz then on to Guinea in 1674. On 9 April 1677 Captain Ralph Dalavall went to Barbados and returned to pay on 18 July 1679. She was activated on 8 April 1680 under Captain John Ashby for service in the English Channel. Captain Henry Williams took command on 6 May 1682 for service in Home Waters then for a convoy to Newfoundland in 1683 followed by service to the Mediterranean in 1684. Captain Charles Skelton took command on 10 July 1686 as guardship at Portsmouth, then sailed with Dartmouth's Fleet in 1688. In 1689 she was under Captain George Byng and later under Captain Abraham Potter. In 1690 she was under Captain John Beverley. She participated in the Battle of Beachy Head as a member of Red Squadron on 30 June 1690. She was reduced to a Fifth Rate vessel in 1691. She recommissioned in 1691 under Captain James Moodie and sailed with a convoy for the West Indies.

== Loss ==
She was captured on 12 July 1691 off Portugal by a French squadron.

== List of captains ==
(see under "Commissioned service" above for captains between 1645 and 1660)

- Captain Robert Kirby: 1/6/1661 - 1/8/1663
- Captain Robert Ensom: 7/6/1666 - 24/2/1667
- Captain Arthur Herbert: 3/4/1667 - 5/9/1668
- Captain John Waterworth: 1/4/1669 - 28/1/1671/72
- Captain Thomas Hamilton: 10/4/1672 - 23/6/1672
- Captain Gustavus Horne: 24.6.1672 - 1.6.1673
- Captain Joseph Harris: 2/6/1673 - 27/7/1674
- Captain Ralph Delavall 9/4/1677 - 18/7/1679
- Captain John Ashby: 8/4/1680 - 5/5/1682
- Captain Henry Williams: 6/5/1682 - 9/9/1684
- Captain Charles Skelton: 10/7/1686 - 1688
- Captain George Byng: 1689
- Captain Abraham Potter: 1689 - 1690
- Captain John Beverley: 1690 - 1691
- Captain James Moody: 31/8/1690 - 12/7/1691
