= William Batten =

English naval officer and politician (c.1601–1667)

Vice-Admiral Sir William Batten JP
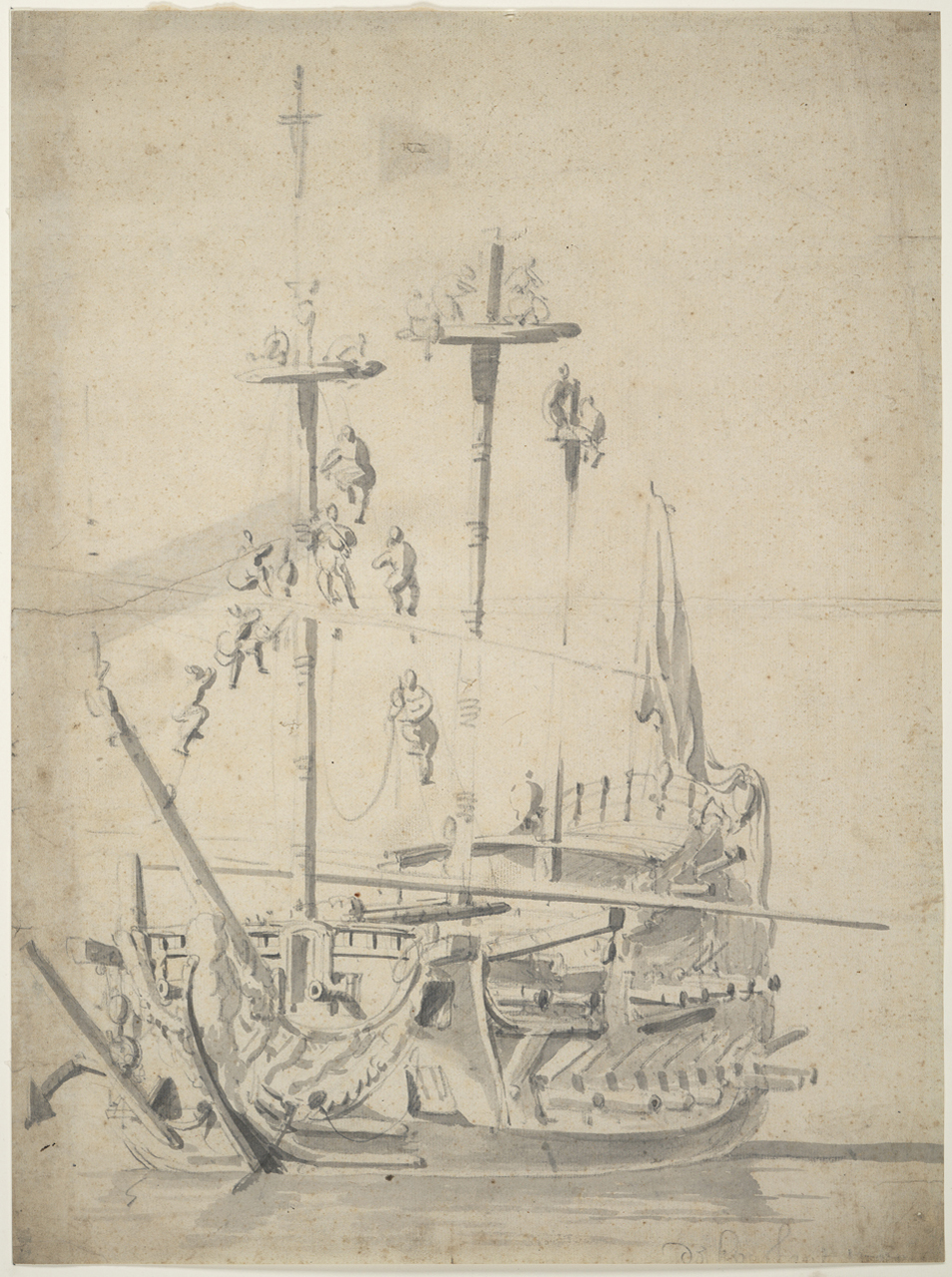
- Constant Warwick, a frigate part-owned by Batten in which he defected to the Royalists in 1648

Master of Trinity House
- In office June 1663 – June 1664

Member of Parliament for Rochester
- In office May 1661 – October 1667

Surveyor of the Navy
- In office 1638 to 1648 – 1660 to 1667

Personal details
- Born: c. 1601 Easton in Gordano, Somerset, England
- Died: 5 October 1667 (aged 65–66) London, England
- Resting place: St. Mary's Church, Walthamstow
- Spouse(s): (1) Margaret Browne (1625–her death) (2) Elizabeth Turner (1659–his death)
- Children: (1) William (1626–after 1675); Benjamin (1644-1684); Mary; Martha (1637–after 1667)
- Occupation: Naval officer and administrator

Military service
- Allegiance: Parliamentarian 1642–1648; Royalist 1648
- Rank: Vice-Admiral
- Battles/wars: Wars of the Three Kingdoms; Siege of Lyme Regis; Siege of Plymouth; Battle of Weymouth; Battle of Colby Moor; Siege of Dartmouth (1646); Siege of Pendennis Castle

Sir William Batten (c. 1601 – 5 October 1667) was an English naval officer and administrator from Somerset, who began his career as a merchant seaman, served as second-in-command of the Parliamentarian navy during the First English Civil War, then defected to the Royalists when the Second English Civil War began in 1648. After the 1660 Stuart Restoration, he was elected Member of Parliament for Rochester and re-appointed Surveyor of the Navy, a position he had previously held from 1638 to 1648. In this capacity, he was a colleague of the author Samuel Pepys, who mentions him frequently in his "Diary", often to his detriment.

== Personal details ==
William Batten was born around 1601 in Easton in Gordano, Somerset, second son of Andrew Batten, Master mariner of a merchant ship. Little is known of his family, except that his elder brother was also in the merchant navy, while he had at least one sister, who married Captain John Browne, another master who served with Batten in the Parliamentarian navy.

In 1625, he married John Browne's sister Margaret, daughter of a London cobbler. They had six children, of whom at least four survived him; William (1626–after 1675), a member of Lincoln's Inn, Benjamin (c. 1644–1684), who followed his father into the navy, Mary, who married James Lemon, and Martha (born 1637) who in 1663 married William Castle, a shipwright. Samuel Pepys mentions the children and their spouses in his "Diary", and has little good to say of any of them, particularly William Castle. He is more positive about Margaret's brother John, who died in 1663 after a drunken fight with one of his servants.

Margaret died sometime in the 1650s, and in 1659 Batten married again, this time to Elizabeth Woodstocke (died 1683), widow of William Woodstocke of Westminster. His second marriage produced no children.

== Early career ==
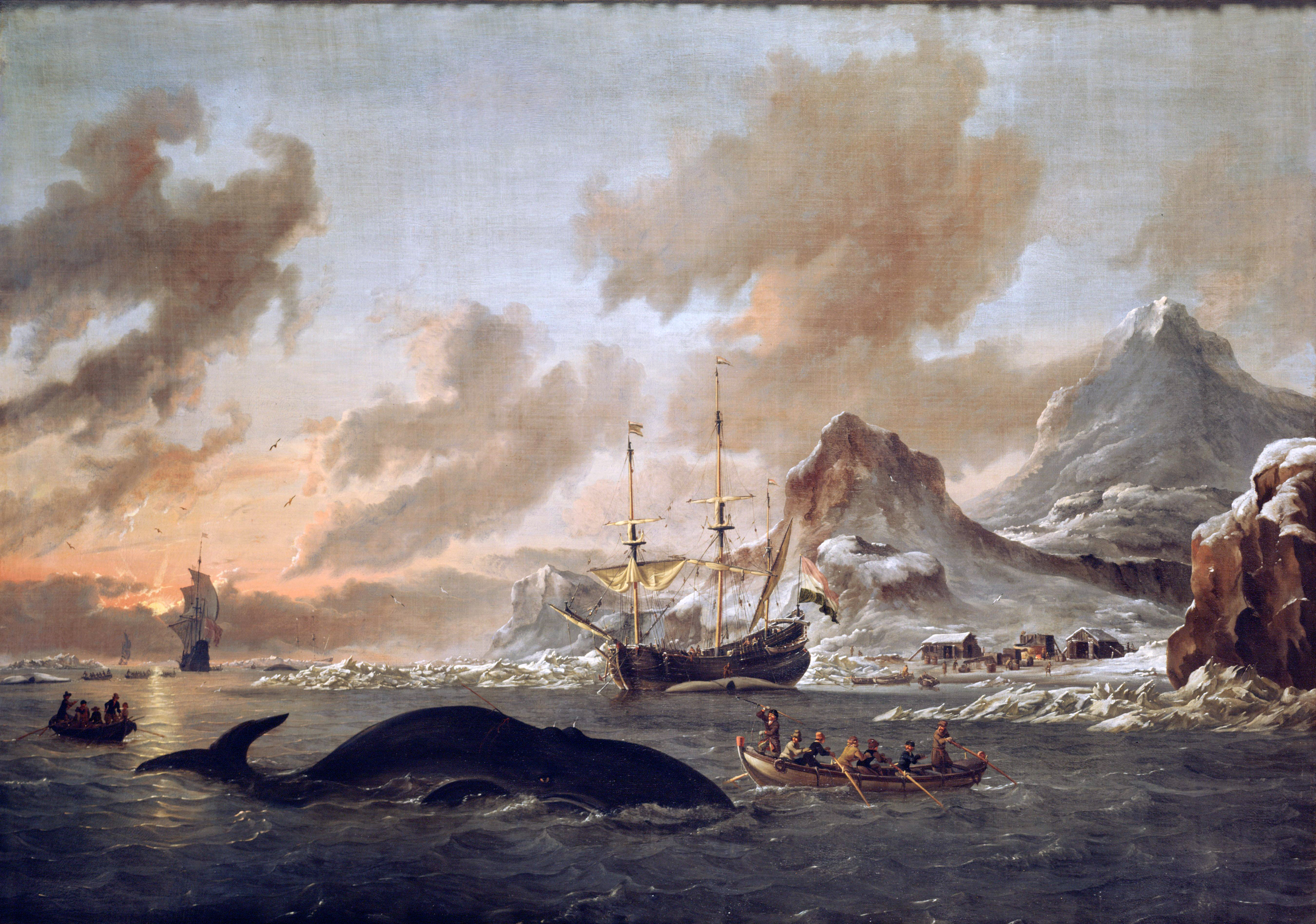
Whalers near Spitsbergen, ca.1690; Batten began his maritime career in a similar ship

Batten started as an apprentice with the Worshipful Company of Merchant Taylors in London, becoming a fully-fledged member in 1623. However, he decided instead to follow his father and brother into the merchant marine, and in 1625 appears as commander of one of two whalers sent to Spitsbergen by Thomas Horth, a merchant from Great Yarmouth.

An Anglo-Spanish war began in 1625 and in August 1626 Batten became captain of the 350-ton "Salutation", an armed merchant ship licensed to attack Spanish shipping. He later resumed his whaling career and by 1630 was master and part-owner of the Charles, a position he retained until 1638 when he took over the Confident, a merchant ship converted for military use and hired by the Royal Navy, paid for by Ship money. In return for a payment of £1,500, Batten became Surveyor of the Navy in September 1638, supported by the Earl of Northumberland, who was Lord High Admiral from 1638 to 1642.

== Wars of the Three Kingdoms ==
Like many officers appointed by Northumberland, including William Rainsborough, father of the political and religious radicals Thomas and William, Batten was a Presbyterian with no previous service in the Royal Navy, a policy intended to increase the number of "Godly" captains within the fleet. As the political struggle with Charles I intensified, in March 1642 Parliament nominated the devout Puritan Robert Rich, 2nd Earl of Warwick, as commander of the navy, with Batten as his vice admiral and second-in-command. These positions were confirmed on 1 July, shortly before Batten received orders from the king, requiring him to place the fleet at his disposal. He immediately sent for Warwick, who declared for Parliament, followed by the majority of his captains.

Major ports in England & Wales, 1642 to 1646

As later noted by Royalist statesman and historian Edward Hyde, 1st Earl of Clarendon, Batten's prompt action in securing the fleet was a major boost to the Parliamentarian cause. Its possession allowed them to protect their own trade routes and block Royalist imports, while other countries were wary of antagonising one of the strongest navies in Europe by supporting their opponents. With the exception of Newcastle, when the First English Civil War began in August 1642, Parliament held every major port in England and Wales. This gave them control of access to internal waterways, the primary method of moving large bodies of men and supplies until the advent of railways in the 19th century, and prevented Royalist areas in Wales, South-West and North-East England from supporting each other. In early 1642, Charles had sent his wife, Henrietta Maria, to Europe to purchase weapons; the absence of a secure port delayed her return until February 1643, and even then, she reached Scarborough only after narrowly escaping a squadron led by Batten.

Although the Royalists captured Bristol and Exeter in 1643, they lacked a significant fleet and so Batten spent most of the war resupplying Parliamentarian garrisons or supporting coastal operations. These included the 1644 sieges of Lyme Regis and Plymouth, where he built a blockhouse at the tip of the peninsula, known since then as Mount Batten. In February 1645, he helped repel a Royalist attack on Weymouth, shortly before the Self-denying Ordinance obliged Warwick to resign. Batten took over as commander but since his promotion was viewed as temporary, he retained his original rank, a perceived lack of appreciation that marked the beginning of his alienation from the Parliamentarian cause.

In August 1645, Batten supported Rowland Laugharne's victory at Colby Moor, which secured Pembrokeshire for Parliament, then helped recapture Dartmouth in February 1646. Charles surrendered to the Scots in June 1646, but victory highlighted divisions between religious Independents like Oliver Cromwell who dominated the New Model Army, and moderate Presbyterians such as Northumberland and Batten who formed a majority in Parliament. In June 1647, the army demanded the impeachment of eleven MPs identified as their principal opponents; to escape arrest, they fled by sea to the Dutch Republic in August and were intercepted by Batten, who released them and was removed from command as a result.

Batten had been in secret correspondence with the Scots Covenanters since December 1646 and now tried to organise support within the fleet for a coup designed to re-assert Parliament's control over the New Model. Part of the fleet defected to the Royalists when the Second English Civil War began in April 1648, and in early July Batten sailed for Holland aboard the Constant Warwick, a frigate part-owned by himself and Warwick. Here he met Prince Charles, who made him a knight and commander of the new Royalist fleet. Batten was regarded with suspicion by many Royalist exiles, particularly Prince Rupert, who replaced him as commander. He returned to England in November 1648.

== Restoration ==
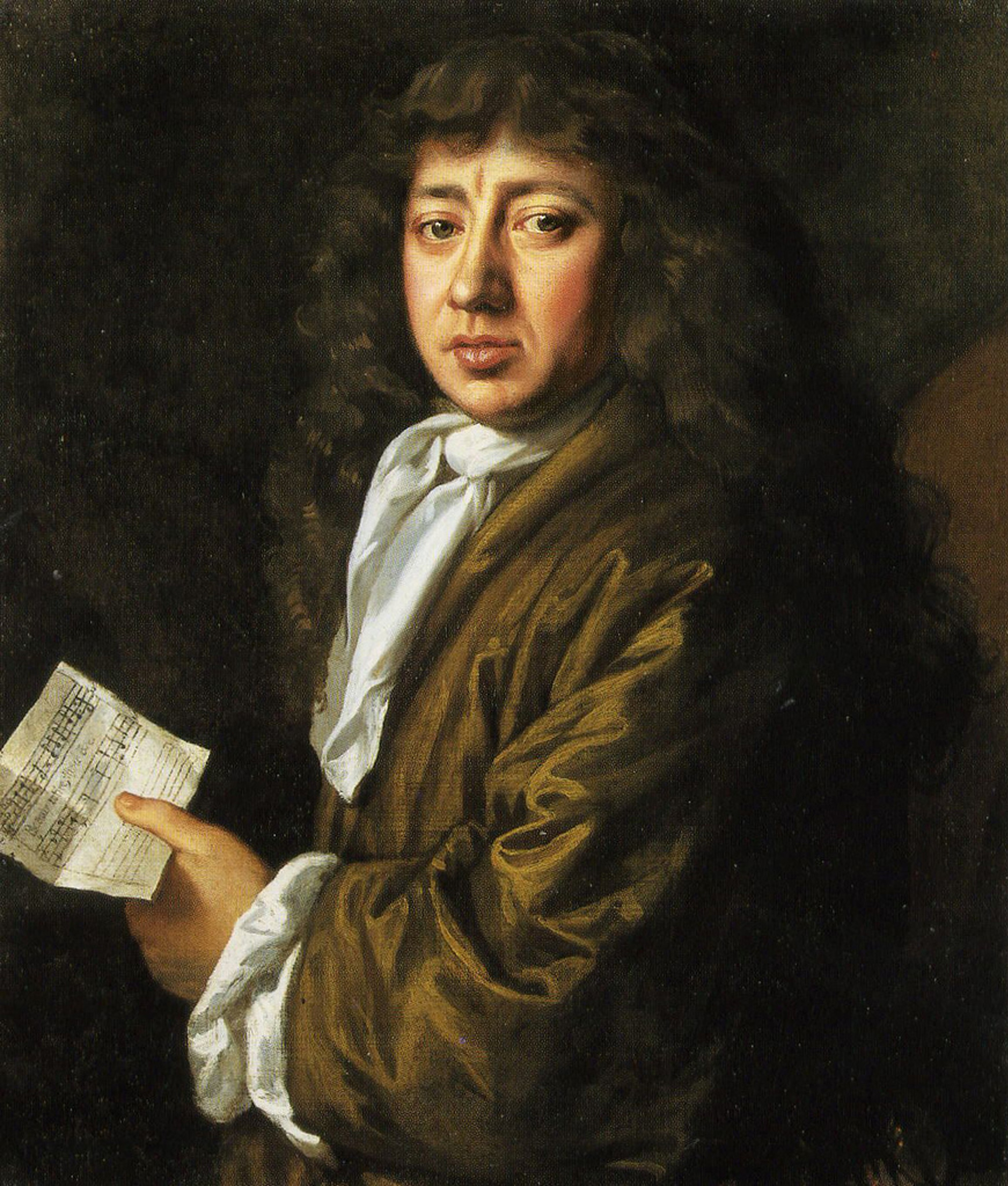
Samuel Pepys c. 1666, Batten's colleague in the Navy Office

Batten escaped punishment for his actions during the Second Civil War, and focused on commercial activities during the Commonwealth period. Shortly after the 1660 Stuart Restoration, he was re-appointed Surveyor of the Navy, which put him in close contact with Samuel Pepys, who mentions him frequently in his Diary. Many entries record their differences, and Batten is frequently portrayed as both administratively incompetent and corrupt, although whether he was excessively so by the standards of the period is debatable. Despite this, Pepys also acknowledged him as a "good neighbour".

In 1661, Batten was elected MP for Rochester in the Cavalier Parliament, and became master of Trinity House in 1663. His second marriage brought him an estate in Walthamstow, where according to Pepys he "lived like a prince". He died after a short illness on 5 October 1667 and was buried at St. Mary's Church, Walthamstow, leaving debts of over £4,000.

== Sources ==
- Andrews, Kenneth (1991). Ships, money, and politics: seafaring and naval enterprise in the reign of Charles I. CUP Archive.
- Conway, William Martin (1906). No Man's Land: A History of Spitsbergen from Its Discovery in 1596 to the Beginning of the Scientific Exploration of the Country. Cambridge, At the University Press.
- Harris, Rendel (1920). The Last of the "Mayflower" (2008 ed.). Manchester University Press. ISBN 978-1443714372.
- Henning, Basil D (1983). BATTEN, Sir William (c.1601-67), of the Navy Office, Seething Lane, London and Black House, Walthamstow, Essex in The History of Parliament: the House of Commons 1660-1690. CUP. ISBN 978-1107002258.
- Knighton, C.S (2004). "Batten, William (1600/01–1667)". Oxford Dictionary of National Biography (online ed.). Oxford University Press. doi:10.1093/ref:odnb/1714. (Subscription, Wikipedia Library access or UK public library membership required.)
- Purkiss, Diane (2006). The English Civil War: A People's History. Harper Press. ISBN 978-0-00-715061-8.
- Wedgwood, C.V. (1958). The King's War, 1641–1647 (1983 ed.). Penguin Classics. ISBN 978-0-14-006991-4.
