= English ship Expedition (1637) =

History

English Navy Royal
- Name: Expedition
- Ordered: 12 December 1636
- Builder: Matthew Graves, Bermondsey
- Launched: 20 March 1637
- Commissioned: 1638

Commonwealth of England
- Name: Expedition
- Acquired: May 1649
- Honours and awards: Portland; Gabbard 1653; Scheveningen 1653

Kingdom of England
- Name: Expedition
- Acquired: May 1660
- Honours and awards: Lowestoffe 1665; Four Days' Fight 1666; Orfordness 1666
- Fate: Sold October 1667

General characteristics
- Class & type: "Pinnace" (i.e. frigate); Fourth Rate – 1651
- Tons burthen: 357 62/94 tons bm
- Length: 90 ft 1 in (27.5 m) keel
- Beam: 27 ft 4 in (8.3 m)
- Depth of hold: 11 ft 0 in (3.4 m)
- Propulsion: Sail
- Sail plan: ship-rigged
- Complement: 120 (1652); 140 (1653)
- Armament: 30 guns as built; 1666 establishment; 7 × culverins (LD); 13 × demi-culverins (LD); 6 × 6-pdrs (UD); 10 × sakers (UD); 2 × 3-pdrs

The Expedition was a 30-gun "pinnace" (later defined as an early frigate) in the service of the English Navy Royal. After an initial participation in a punitive attack on Morocco, she spent the majority of her career in Home Waters. During the English Civil War she was employed in the Parliamentary Naval Force. In 1551 she was assigned to the Commonwealth Navy. During the First Dutch War she took part in the Battle of Portland, the Battle of the Gabbard and the Battle of Scheveningen in 1553. During the Second Dutch War she participated in the Battle of Lowestoft in 1665 and the Four Days' Battle and the St James' Day Battle (Orfordness) in 1666. She was re-classed as a 32-gun ship in 1666, but then again re-rated and converted to a fireship in June 1667, and then sold in October 1667.

Expedition was the second vessel to be given that name in the English Navy Royal, since it had been used for a 20-gun French ship captured in 1618 which remained listed until 1652.

== Construction and specifications ==
She was ordered on 12 December 1636 to be built under contract by Matthew Graves at Bermondsey in London on the River Thames (a sistership, the Providence, was ordered on the same day from another shipbuilder, but was likewise built in Bermondsey). The order specified that each ship should carry 14 pieces of ordnance and have 16 banks of oars.

An early scale draught believed to be of the original concept of the ship with the cipher of Charles I shows the sixteen pairs of oars on the lower deck (with 4 men shown in the cross-section for each oar, requiring 128 oarsmen in total!) and ten pairs of broadside gunports on the upper deck (the rearmost two pairs of ports under the quarterdeck lower, with the deck stepped down to provide accommodation at the stern), plus two pairs of smaller gunports on the forecastle and four pairs on the quarterdeck, thereby able to accommodate 32 guns in all, although the last pair of ports on the quarterdeck were not initially assigned any guns, so the assigned total was 30 guns with a complement of 120 officers and men.

Interestingly, the bow on the draught shows a beak typical of Tudor galleons and early Stuart warships, rather than the inclined bowsprit which emerged in the 1640s. The draught gives dimensions of 96 ft in keel length and 32 ft in breadth, for a burthen tonnage of 347 tons, although the completed ships had lesser dimensions

The Expedition was launched just 98 days later on 20 March 1637 (the Providence followed on the next day) and classed as a Fourth Rate (frigate). Her initial dimensions were given as 90 ft keel length and 26 ft in breadth, for a burthen tonnage of 32358/94 tons.

A portrait of the ship by Willem van de Velde the Elder in the early 1660s showed significant changes in the appearance of the Expedition. The ship had been girdled (adding extra layers of timbers along both sides) during the Commonwealth era to improve her stability (the precise date is unrecorded), increasing the beam to 27 feet 4 inches (8.3 metres), and the oarports had disappeared. The builder's measurement was now 35762/94 tons, and the keel:beam ration had thus fallen from 3.46:1 to 3.29:1, although this ration is still closely comparable to the Fourth Rate frigates of the later 1640s like the Constant Warwick. The main battery of 20 guns (comprising a mixture of culverins (Note: The culverin was a gun of 4,500 pounds with a 5.5-inch bore firing a 17.5-pound shot with a twelve-pound powder charge.) and demi-culverins) (Note: The demi-culverin was a gun of 3,400 pounds with a four-inch bore firing a 9.5-pound shot with an eight-pound powder charge.) were now on the lower deck, while the forecastle and quarterdeck have now been joined to form a continuous upper deck armed with six pairs of sakers, (Note: The sacar or saker was a gun of 1,400 pounds with a 3.5-inch bore firing a 5.5-pound shot with a 5.5-pound powder charge.) although the waist portion still lacked any ports for guns. Her manning of 120 officers and men in 1652 was raised to 140 in 1653.

Under the 1666 establishment her gun armament consisted of seven culverins and thirteen demi-culverines on the lower deck, with six 6-pounder guns, (Note: The 6-pounder was a captured Dutch weapon adopted to replace the saker.) and ten sakers on the upper deck, plus two 3-pounders (Note: The 3-pounder was a captured Dutch weapon used as a stop gap in place of the minion or 4-pounder when supplies were low.) on the poop deck.

== Commissioned service ==
=== Service in the English Navy Royal ===
She was commissioned in the Spring of 1637 under Captain George White and took part (with the Providence as well as the Leopard and Antelope) in a successful naval expedition led by Vice-Admiral William Rainsborough against the Barbary corsairs of Salé in North West Morocco in June 1637. She recommissioned in 1638 under the command of Captain Robert Slingsby who held command into 1639. In 1640 she came under the command of Captain Richard Seaman who held command until 1641.

=== Service during English Civil War and Commonwealth Navy ===
In 1642 she was commissioned into the Parliamentary Naval Forces under the command of Captain Baldwin (or Isaac) Wake for service in the English Channel. In 1643 Captain Brooks then later in the year Captain Joseph Jordan for service in Irish Waters until 1646. During the winter of 1646–1647 she was under the command of Sir George Ayscue for service with the Winter Guard. For 1647-48 She was again under Captain Jordan with the Western Guard and in the Irish Sea. In 1650 she was under the command of Captain Abraham Wheeler at the blockade of Lisbon, Portugal. In 1651 she was under the command of Captain Thomas Vallis.

==== The First Anglo-Dutch War ====
Expedition was a member of Robert Blake's Fleet at the Battle of Portland from 18 to 20 February 1653. She was present at the Battle of the Gabbard as a member of White Squadron Van Division from s to 3 June 1653. She followed this with the Battle of Scheveningen near Texel on 31 July 1653. She was a member of White Squadron, Van Division. She was at Chatham during the winter of 1653–54.

During 1656 thru 1659 she was under the command of Captain Edward Thompson for operations in the Sound.

=== Service after the Restoration ===
From 21 November to 2 January 1665 she was under the command of Captain Valentine Piend. From 31 January to 27 February 1665 she was under the command of Captain Captain James Ableson.

==== Second Anglo-Dutch War ====
With the start of the Second Anglo-Dutch War Captain Tobias Sackler took command on 10 March 1665 until his death on 30 July 1666. As a member of White Squadron, Van Division, she participated in the Battle of Lowestoft on 3 June 1665. She was part of Rear-Admiral Sir Thomas Teddiman's Squadron in the Battle of Vagen (at Bergen, Norway). Unfortunately she was unable to enter the harbour and therefore was not engaged in the battle. At the Four Days' Battle, she arrived as a member of Van Division in Prince Rupert's Squadron on 4 June 1666 suffering two killed and three wounded. She was also involved in the St James Day Battle as a member of White Squadron, Van Division on 25 July 1666. Captain Denjamin Simmonds took over command on 31 July 1666 after the death of Captain Sackler. Captain Simmonds was followed by Captain John Turner on 6 September 1666 until 19 October 1666. On 27 February 1667, Captain Turner took command again until 23 May.

== Disposition ==
Expedition was converted to a fireship in June 1667, then sold in October 1667.
