= English ship Antelope (1546) =

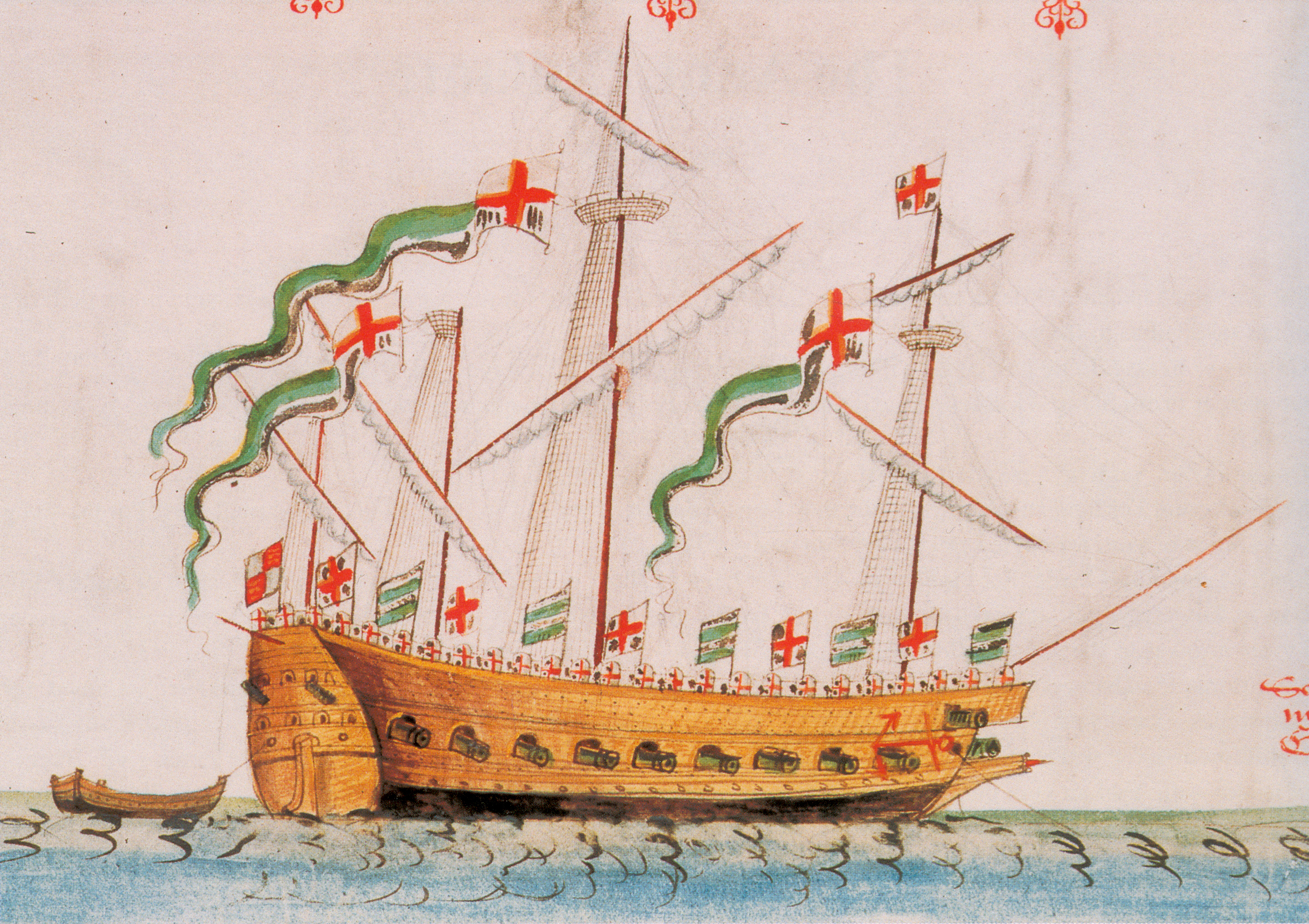
- The Antelope as depicted in the Anthony Roll

History

England
- Name: Antelope
- Launched: 1546
- Fate: Burnt, 1649
- Notes: Participated in: Spanish Armada

General characteristics as built
- Tons burthen: 300
- Propulsion: Sweeps, sails
- Complement: 200 officers and men
- Armament: 44 guns of various weights of shot

General characteristics after 1558 rebuild
- Class & type: 38-gun Galleon
- Tons burthen: 341 tons
- Propulsion: Sails
- Complement: 160 officers, men and soldiers
- Armament: 38 guns of various weights of shot

General characteristics after 1581 rebuild
- Class & type: 38-gun Galleon
- Tons burthen: 350 tons
- Propulsion: Sails
- Complement: 160 officers, men and soldiers
- Armament: 38 guns of various weights of shot

General characteristics after 1618 rebuild
- Class & type: 34-gun Middling ship
- Tons burthen: 450 tons
- Length: 92 ft (28 m) (keel)
- Beam: 32 ft (9.8 m)
- Depth of hold: 12 ft 6 in (3.81 m)
- Propulsion: Sails
- Sail plan: Full-rigged ship
- Armament: 34 guns of various weights of shot

The Antelope was a ship of the English Tudor navy, launched in 1546. She was rebuilt three times, in 1558, 1581 and 1618. She thus served in various forms from the time of King Henry VIII to the English Civil War. She is mostly remembered for being a part of the fleet that defeated the Spanish Armada.

== History of the ship ==
According to the royal inventory of 1547, the Antelope had a crew of 170 with 30 gunners. Her armaments included; a brass demi-cannon; 3 brass culverins; 4 iron demi-culverins; 3 sakers; 4 port pieces; 2 slings; 2 demi-slings; 2 quarter-slings; 11 iron single bases; 8 hagbuts and 4 hail-shot pieces. Handarms included 50 yew bows, 86 bills, and 72 Moorish pikes. The Antelope was described in a navy list of 5 January 1548 as a "galleass" of 300 tons built in 1546 with a crew of 200 and armed with 4 brass and 40 iron guns. As depicted in the Anthony Roll, she was a flush-decked vessel carrying a battery of guns on the lower deck; she carried a four-masted rig and her lower deck was pierced for nine pairs of gunports. In 1549 she was re-classed from a galleass to a 'ship'. In action against Scotland, the Antelope was one of 12 ships dispersed by a storm off Flamborough Head on Wednesday 27 December 1559. Captain Southwick brought her back to join William Winter's fleet in the Firth of Forth.

She was rebuilt in 1558 as a galleon of 341 tons, acquiring a forecastle and a half-deck aft. In 1581 she was again rebuilt as a race-built galleon of 400 tons. A more detailed description is given in a navy list of 1603 where she is said to have measured 350 tons and had a crew of 160 (consisting of 114 sailors, 16 gunners and 30 soldiers). At this time, Antelope carried 26 heavy and 12 light guns.

She participated in the campaign against the Spanish Armada in 1588, when she had a crew of 170 and mounted 30 guns. The Antelope was captained by Sir Henry Palmer and belonged to the squadron of Lord Henry Seymour in which she took part in the Battle of Gravelines and the chase of the Spanish fleet to the north. In 1597 Antelope, then commanded by Captain Sir Thomas Vavasour, participated in the unsuccessful expedition against the Azores led by the Earl of Essex and Sir Walter Raleigh.

She was again rebuilt in 1618 and classified as a middling ship of 450 tons and 34 guns. The only remarkable action in her later career is her participation in Sir Robert Mansells disappointing expedition against Algiers in 1620/1621. Francis Stuart sailed in the St George and the Antelope to Spain in 1623, bringing a parcel of jewels for Buckingham and Prince Charles.

In the beginning of October 1624 Antelope - then under the command of Sir Thomas Button - was hit by a storm and driven onto the Goodwin Sands after her anchor cables were cut by a merchant ship. Though she lost all her masts and her rudder she got off into the Downs and was repaired by Phineas Pett whose son John had been on board. He left a description of this incident in his Autobiography.

During the Second English Civil War she was among the ships that were brought over to the royalist side by vice admiral William Batten in June 1648 and carried into Hellevoetsluis in the Netherlands. When Prince Rupert was made commander of the badly equipped royalist fleet, he sold Antelope's brass guns to fit out some other ships. In the spring of 1649 Antelope was ready for sea, but her weak crew was surprised by a raid of seamen from the parliamentarian ship Happy Entrance who took the ship without a fight and immediately destroyed her.
