= English ship Providence (1637) =

History

English Navy Royal
- Name: Providence
- Ordered: 12 December 1636
- Builder: Robert Tranckmore, St Savior's Dock, Bermondsey
- Launched: 21 March 1637
- Commissioned: 1638

Commonwealth of England
- Name: Providence
- Acquired: May 1649
- Honours and awards: Portland 1653; The Gabbard 1653; Scheveningen 1553

Kingdom of England
- Name: Providence
- Acquired: May 1660
- Honours and awards: Lowestoffe 1665; Four Days' Battle 1666; St James' Day Battle (Orfordness) 1666
- Fate: Wrecked at Tangier 31 October 1668

General characteristics
- Class & type: "Pinnace" (i.e. frigate); Fourth Rate – 1651
- Tons burthen: 357 62/94 tons bm
- Length: 90 ft 1 in (27.5 m) keel
- Beam: 27 ft 4 in (8.3 m)
- Depth of hold: 11 ft 0 in (3.4 m)
- Propulsion: Sail
- Sail plan: ship-rigged
- Complement: 120 (1652); 140 (1653)
- Armament: 30 guns as built; 1666 establishment; 6 × culverins (LD); 14 × demi-culverins (LD); 14 × sakers (UD)

Providence was a 30-gun "pinnace" (later defined as an early frigate) in the service of the English Navy Royal. After an initial participation in a punitive attack on Morocco, she spent the majority of her career in Home Waters. During the English Civil War she was employed in the Parliamentary Naval Force. In 1551 she was assigned to the Commonwealth Navy. During the First Dutch War she took part in the Battle of Portland, the Battle of the Gabbard and the Battle of Scheveningen in 1553. During the Second Dutch War she participated in the Battle of Lowestoft in 1665 and the Four Days' Battle and the St James' Day Battle (Orfordness) in 1666. She was re-classed as a 32-gun ship in 1666, but then again re-rated and converted to a fireship in June 1667, but was wrecked at Tangier on 31 October 1667.

The Providence was the first vessel to be given that name in the English and Royal Navies.

== Construction and specifications ==
She was ordered on 12 December 1636 to be built under contract by Robert Tranckmore (a noted shipbuilder with a shipyard at Shoreham-by-Sea, Sussex) at St Savior's Dock at Bermondsey in London on the River Thames. A sistership (the Expedition) was ordered on the same day from another shipbuilder (Matthew Graves) in Bermondsey. The order specified that each ship should carry 14 pieces of ordnance and have 16 banks of oars.

An early scale draught believed to be of the original concept of the ship with the cipher of Charles I shows the sixteen pairs of oars on the lower deck (with 4 men shown in the cross-section for each oar, requiring 128 oarsmen in total!) and ten pairs of broadside gunports on the upper deck (the rearmost two pairs of ports under the quarterdeck lower, with the deck stepped down to provide accommodation at the stern), plus two pairs of smaller gunports on the forecastle and four pairs on the quarterdeck, thereby able to accommodate 32 guns in all, although the last pair of ports on the quarterdeck were not initially assigned any guns, so the assigned total was 30 guns with a complement of 120 officers and men.

Interestingly, the bow on the draught shows a beak typical of Tudor galleons and early Stuart warships, rather than the inclined bowsprit which emerged in the 1640s. The draught gives dimensions of 96 ft in keel length and 32 ft in breadth, for a burthen tonnage of 347 tons, although the completed ships had lesser dimensions

The Providence was launched just 99 days later on 21 March 1637 (one day after the Expedition) and classed as a Fourth Rate (frigate). Her initial dimensions were given as 90 ft keel length and 26 ft in breadth, for a burthen tonnage of 32358/94 tons.

A portrait of the ship by Willem van de Velde the Younger in 1661 showed significant changes in the appearance of the Providence. The ship had been girdled (adding extra layers of timbers along both sides) during the Commonwealth era to improve her stability (the precise date is unrecorded), increasing the beam to 27 feet 4 inches (8.3 metres), and the oarports had disappeared. The builder's measurement was now 35762/94 tons, and the keel:beam ration had thus fallen from 3.46:1 to 3.29:1, although this ration is still closely comparable to the Fourth Rate frigates of the later 1640s like the Constant Warwick. The main battery of 20 guns (comprising six culverins (Note: The culverin was a gun of 4,500 pounds with a 5.5-inch bore firing a 17.5-pound shot with a twelve-pound powder charge.) and fourteen demi-culverins) (Note: The demi-culverin was a gun of 3,400 pounds with a four-inch bore firing a 9.5-pound shot with an eight-pound powder charge.) were now on the lower deck, while the forecastle and quarterdeck have now been joined to form a continuous upper deck armed with six pairs of sakers, (Note: The sacar or saker was a gun of 1,400 pounds with a 3.5-inch bore firing a 5.5-pound shot with a 5.5-pound powder charge.) although the waist portion still lacked any ports for guns; a seventh pair of sakers is fitted in the poop above the quarterdeck. Her manning of 120 officers and men in 1652 was raised to 140 in 1653.

== Commissioned service ==
=== Service in the English Navy Royal ===
She was commissioned in 1637 under the command of Captain Edmund Seaman (or Symonds) who held command into 1639. She took part in June 1637 in a successful naval expedition led by William Rainsborough against the Barbary corsairs of Salé (the "Sallee pirates") in North West Morocco. In 1640 she came under the command of Captain Richard Hill who held command until 1641.

=== Service during English Civil War and Commonwealth Navy ===
In 1642 she was commissioned into the Parliamentary Naval Forces under the command of Captain Strachan for service in the English Channel. In 1643 she was under command of Captain William Brooks then in 1644 Captain Thomas Plunkett (until suspended) for service in Irish Waters. Captain Plunkett was replaced by Captain John Ellison in 1644. From 1645 to 1647 she was under the command of John Stansby. For the winter of 1646–1647 she was with the Winter Guard. In the spring of 1647 she moved to the Downs. Later in summer or fall 1647 she was under Captain John Mildmay in the Irish Sea. She was assigned to Warwick's Fleet at the Downs in September 1648. Captain John Pearce took command in 1649. She was with Robert Blake's Fleet blockading Lisbon in October 1650. She remained with the Fleet when they moved to the Irish Sea in 1651.

==== Service in the First Anglo-Dutch War ====
She was temporarily under the command of Captain George Swanley in May 1652. She was part of Robert Blake's Fleet at the Battle of Portland between 18 and 20 February 1653. She was a member of Red Squadron, Van Division that engaged the Dutch at the Battle of the Gabbard on 2–3 June 1653. On 31 July 1653 the fleets engaged again at the Battle of Scheveningen near Texel. During the engagement she was a member of Red Squadron, Van Division. In all three battles she was listed at 33 guns, probably indicating that one of her 34 nominal guns had been lost or rendered unusable.

In 1654 she was under command of Captain Thomas Bunn followed by Captain Robert Kirby in 1655. Later in 1656 she was under command of Captain John Littlejohn with Robert Blake's Fleet. In 1658 she was under Captain John Pointz followed by Captain Giles Shelley in 1660, both for service off the coast of Scotland.

=== Service after the Restoration ===
On 19 March she was under Captain John Tyrwitt until 2 April 1665.

==== Second Anglo-Dutch War ====
On 16 April Captain Richard James took command. She was at the Battle of Lowestoft on 3 June 1665 as a member of Blue Squadron, Rear Division. The following year she was at the Four Days' Battle again as a member of Blue Squadron though as a member of the Van Division from 1 to 4 June 1666. She suffered two killed and six wounded. This was followed by the St James Day Battle again as a member of Blue Squadron, Van Division on 25 July 1666. She was converted to a fireship in June 1667 and commissioned under Captain James Cooke on 10 June 1667. On 2 April she received a new commander, Captain Hugh Ridley.

== Disposition ==
Providence was wrecked at Tangier on 31 October 1668 while her captain (Hugh Ridley) was ashore.
