= English ship Unicorn (1634) =

Ship of the line of the Royal Navy

History

England
- Name: Unicorn
- Namesake: Unicorn
- Builder: Edward Boate
- Launched: 1634
- Fate: Sold, 1688

General characteristics
- Class & type: 46-gun Second rate ship of the line
- Tons burthen: 823
- Length: 107 ft (33 m) (keel)
- Beam: 36 ft 4 in (11.07 m)
- Depth of hold: 15 ft 1 in (4.60 m)
- Sail plan: Full-rigged ship
- Armament: 46 guns (at launch); 56 guns (1660)

Unicorn was a 46-gun second rate ship of the line of the English Royal Navy, launched at Woolwich in 1634.

== History ==
On 14 April 1634, shortly after the Unicorn was launched, her first captain, Sir John Penington, was knighted on her deck by King Charles I. On 8 May 1634 aboard the Unicorn in The Downs, Sir John in a letter to the Admiralty wrote that the Unicorn was "tender sided" and "walty" and in her current state "could hold no sail" and as such, was not serviceable. He further states that this opinion was also held by all of his officers, as well as the builder Mr. Boate, who was also aboard. In defence of the builder, he says in all other respects the Unicorn handles "as well as any other ship he has put his foot in" and she "only wants two or three more foot of breadth". He goes on to state, that "the builder says that it is not his fault, for the dimensions were given to him, and he made her 20 inches broader than he had order." In the Admiralty's reply, dated 14 May, to his letter of the 8th, Sir John was instructed to bring the Unicorn into Gillingham, transfer all of his men and supplies into the Charles, which was promised to be ready by the 24th. As Sir John had recommended, the Unicorn would be "furred" (made broader) so that she would be serviceable as a Man-of-War.

In 1636, former pirate Sir Henry Mainwaring was placed in command of the Unicorn. The ship's initial armament comprised 16 demi-cannon, 11 demi-culverin, 26 culverin, and 10 sakers. When she underwent a refit in 1677, her armament was upgraded to 22 demi-cannon on the lower gun deck, 22 demi-culverin on the middle gun deck, 14 sakers on the upper gun deck, and 6 sakers on the quarterdeck. Originally comprising 250 men in 1636, Unicorn's crew increased to 300 in 1653, and 410 in 1666.

In 1639, Unicorn, under the command of Captain David Murray, was used to patrol the English Channel. Penington, now an admiral, later resumed command and used Unicorn as his flagship until he was replaced by Thomas Trenchfield in 1642. During the Anglo-Dutch War, Unicorn, commanded by Peter Andrews, escorted English convoys and also saw action against the Turks. Her armament was upgraded and her crew increased from 250 to 260.

=== Captain Haddock ===
From 1648 until 1652, the captain of the Unicorn was the grandfather, and namesake, of Admiral Richard Haddock. During the English Civil War, the elder Haddock served first the king, then Parliament. He was presented with a gold medal for his involvement in the Anglo-Dutch War and was promoted to vice-admiral. It is likely his son William, and grandson Richard, served alongside him as it was common practise to enlist young boys as midshipmen or "apprentice officers."

The Unicorn was immortalised in Herge's Adventures of Tintin comic books as the ship of Captain Haddock's ancestor Sir Francis Haddock, an English naval officer in the service of Charles II of England. The fictional Unicorn was captured by pirates and blown up by her captain, presumably taking her treasure to the bottom of the sea. In 2011, the story was adapted into an animated film directed by Steven Spielberg.

== Battle honors ==
Unicorn's battle honors included Porto Farina 1655, Santa Cruz 1657, Lowestoft 1665, Four Days' Battle 1666, Orfordness 1666, Sole Bay 1672, Schooneveld 1673 and Texel 1673.

By 1660, her armament had been increased to 56 guns. Unicorn was sold out of the navy in 1688.
