= English ship James (1634) =

Ship of the line of the Royal Navy

History

England
- Name: James
- Builder: Phineas Pett II, Deptford Dockyard
- Launched: 1634
- Renamed: Old James in 1660
- Fate: Sold, 1682

General characteristics
- Class & type: 48-gun second-rank ship of the line
- Tons burthen: 875 bm
- Length: 110 ft (34 m) (keel)
- Beam: 37 ft 6 in (11.43 m)
- Depth of hold: 16 ft 2 in (4.93 m)
- Sail plan: Full-rigged ship
- Armament: 48 guns (at launch); 60 guns (1660)

James was a 48-gun second rank ship of the line of the English Royal Navy, built by Phineas Pett II at Deptford Dockyard and launched in 1634.

In 1660, at the Restoration of the English monarchy, the 70-gun Richard was renamed Royal James and James became known as Old James; her armament had by this time been increased to 60 guns.

Old James was sold out of the navy in 1682.
