= Johan van Galen =

Dutch commodore (1604–1653)

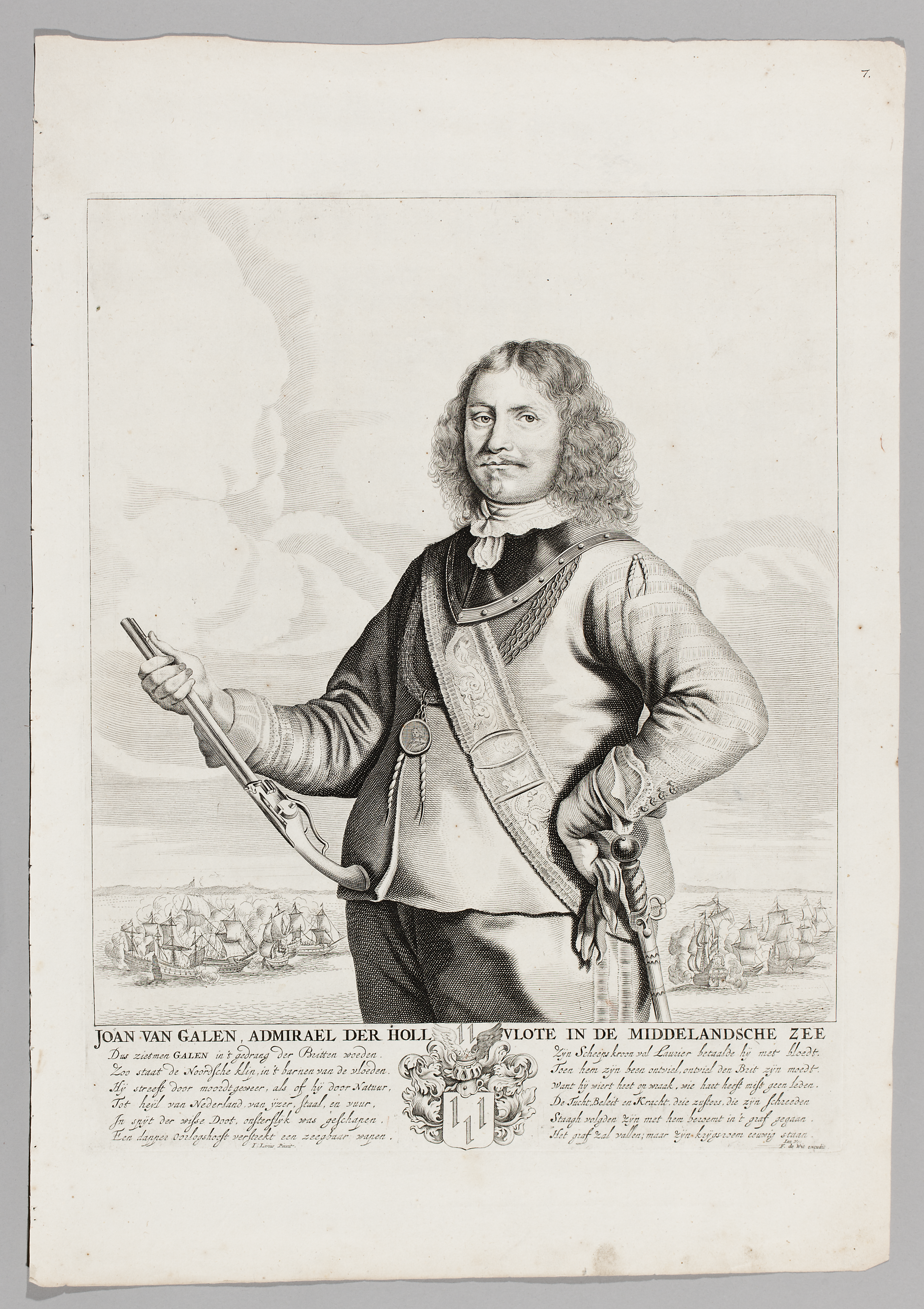
- Commodore Jan van Galen
- Born: c. 1604; Essen, Germany
- Died: 13 March 1653 (aged 48–49) Livorno, Italy
- Buried: Nieuwe Kerk, The Netherlands
- Allegiance: Dutch Republic
- Rank: Commodore
- Wars: Eighty Years' War; Battle of the Downs; First Anglo-Dutch War

Johan "Jan" van Galen (1604 – 13 March 1653) was a Commodore of the Republic of the Seven United Provinces of the Netherlands. (Note: During this period in English history dates of events are usually recorded in the Julian calendar, while those the Netherlands are recorded in the Gregorian calendar. In this article dates are in the Julian calendar with the start of the year adjusted to 1 January (see Old Style and New Style dates).) he participated in the First Anglo-Dutch War.

== Biography ==
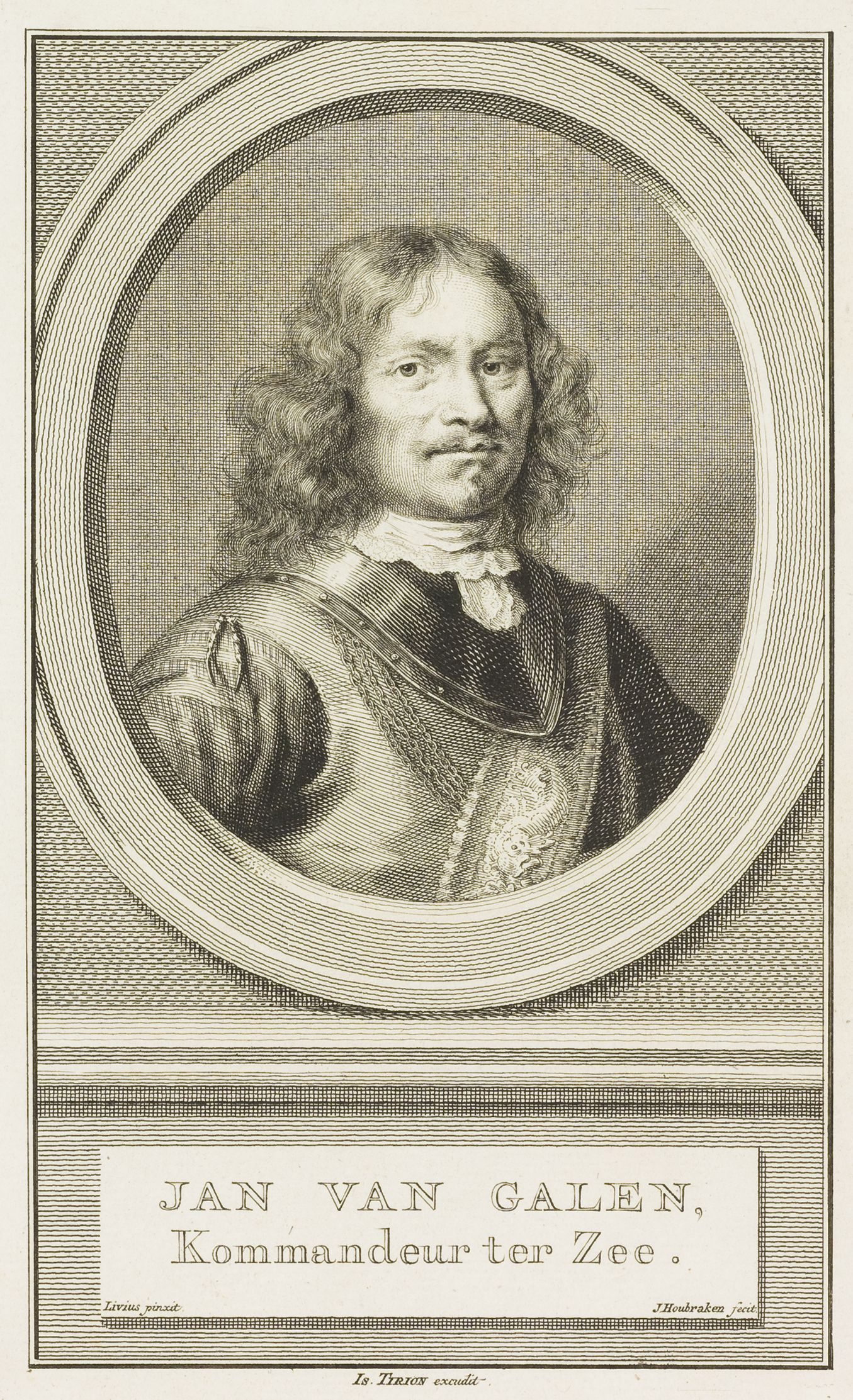
Johan van Galen

Johan van Galen was born in Essen. He fought in the Eighty Years' War against Spain, becoming a captain in 1630 and a regular captain in 1635, mostly fighting the Dunkirkers. In 1639, he fought in the Battle of the Downs under the command of Joris van Cats.

In 1645, as a Rear-Admiral, Van Galen was part of Vice-Admiral Witte de With's convoy breaking the blockade of The Sound by Denmark. Both men were very hot-tempered and proud; emotions ran so high that, at one point, in anger, Van Galen lowered his command flag and trampled it with his feet. De With put him in chains and delivered him to the capital of the adversary, Copenhagen. The embarrassed Danish court released Van Galen after an intervention by the French envoy.

A peculiarity of Van Galen is that he never served in the navy proper, an institution he disliked, but was employed by the Amsterdam Direction Chamber, a private organisation supporting the official navy. After the Republic had made peace with Spain in 1648, Van Galen was sent out three times, with Spanish assistance, to fight the corsairs of the Barbary Coast. In 1649, he was badly wounded when a gang of Spanish criminals intercepted him when he was returning in a sloop with prize money.

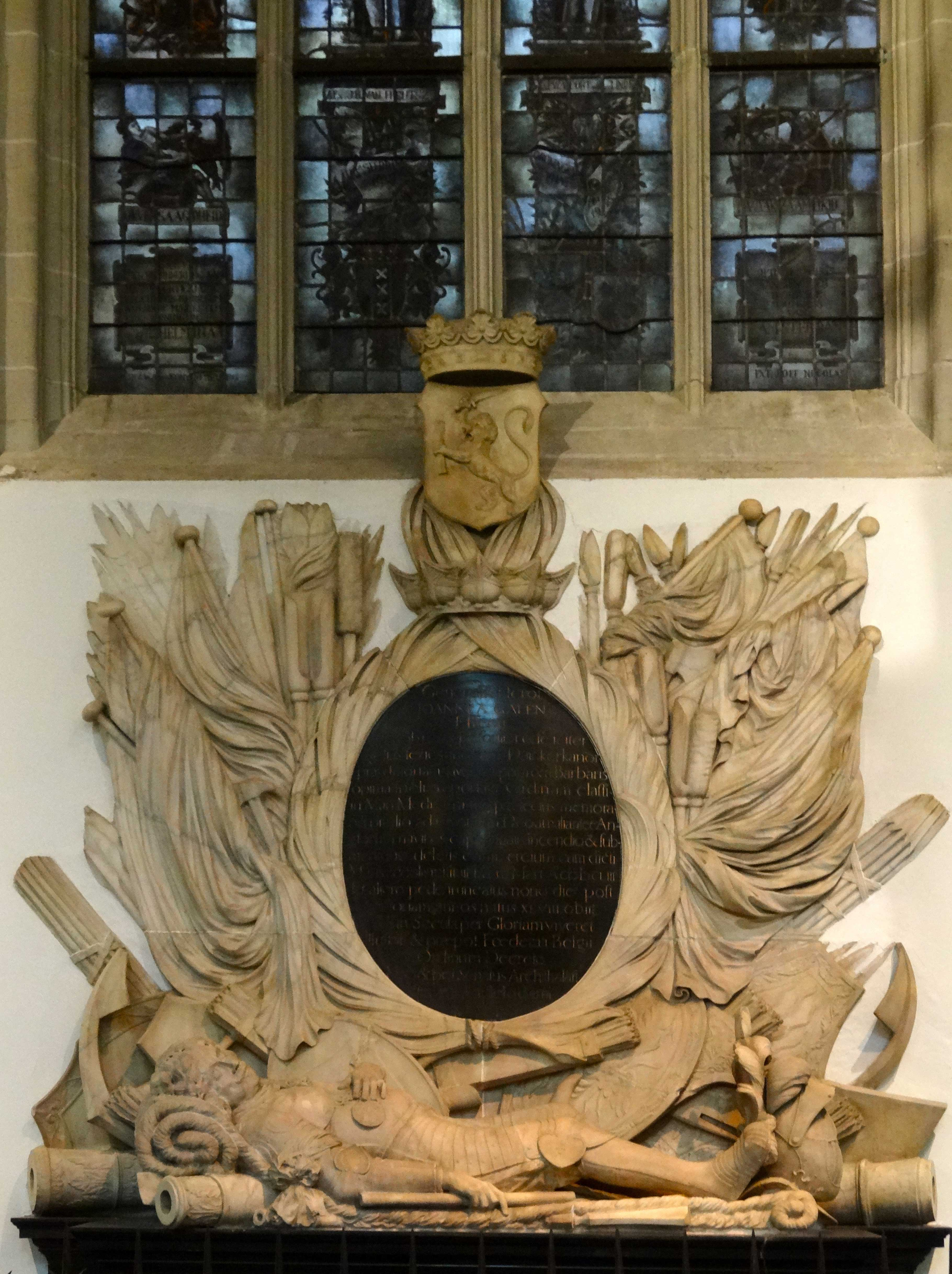
Funerary monument in the Nieuwe Kerk (Amsterdam)

Van Galen retired late in 1650, but when the First Anglo-Dutch War between the Republic and the Commonwealth of England broke out, he was asked by the States-General, on 3 July 1652, (Note: 13 July Gregorian calendar) to assume command of a Dutch fleet in the Mediterranean, as a Commodore and replacing Commandeur Joris van Cats. He departed on 24 July, (Note: 3 August Gregorian calendar) reaching Livorno on 22 August. (Note: 1 September Gregorian calendar) He was mortally wounded during the Battle of Leghorn, where his fleet destroyed part of the English Mediterranean Fleet. A cannonball smashed his right lower leg; it was amputated below-deck and afterwards, Van Galen continued to direct the battle. He died from wound fever ten days later in Livorno on 13 March 1653. (Note: 23 March Gregorian calendar) Cornelis Tromp was then a young captain under his command.

Van Galen was given a state burial in the Nieuwe Kerk in Amsterdam and in 1656, a marble grave memorial was erected on which this poem is inscribed:

Hier leit in 't Graf van Eer den dapperen Van Galen,
Die eerst ging buit op buit Kastiliën afhalen,
En, met een Leeuwenhert, nabij 't Toskaensche strant,
De Britten heeft verjaegt, verovert en verbrandt.

Translation:

Here lies, in a grave of honor, brave Van Galen,
Who first took prize after prize from Castile,
And, with a Lion's Heart, near the Toscan beach,
The British has chased away, captured and burnt.

== See also ==
- Jan van Galenstraat metro station
