= English ship Elizabeth (1647) =

English warship burned by Dutch in Virginia

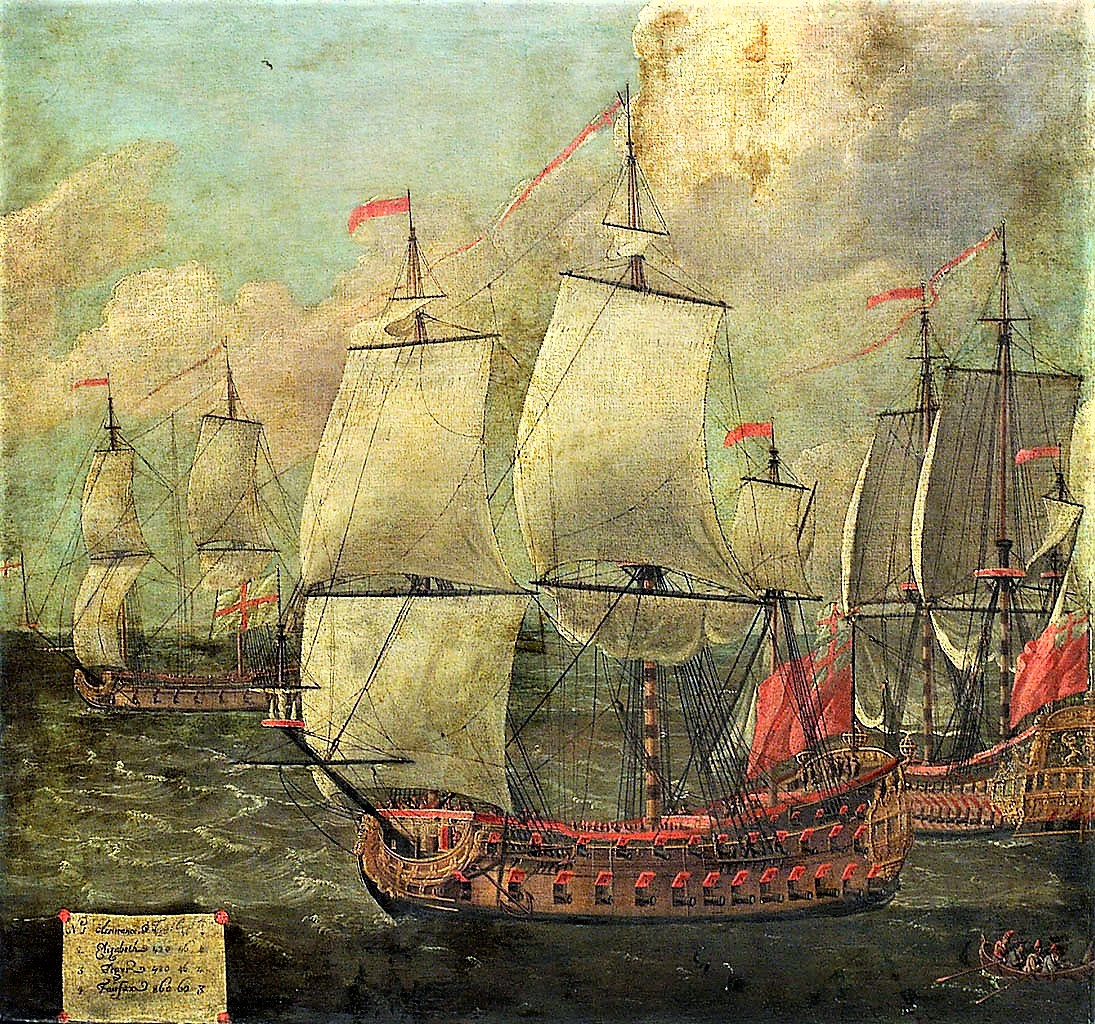
- The Fairfax (at the forefront), with Elizabeth astern of her, and Assurance or Tiger to their left, a painting attributed to Isaac Sailmaker

History

Commonwealth of England
- Name: Elizabeth
- Builder: Peter Pett I, Deptford Dockyard
- Launched: 1647
- Commissioned: 1648

Kingdom of England
- Name: Elizabeth
- Acquired: May 1660
- Honours and awards: Orfordness 1666
- Fate: Burnt in action with Dutch 5 June 1667

General characteristics
- Class & type: 38-gun fourth rate
- Tons burthen: 47515/94 bm
- Length: 101 ft 6 in (30.9 m) keel for tonnage
- Beam: 29 ft 8 in (9.0 m)
- Depth of hold: 14 ft 10 in (4.5 m)
- Sail plan: ship-rigged
- Complement: 150 1652; 160 1653; 160/130/100 1666
- Armament: 38/32 guns initially; 1666; 12 × culverins; 20 × demi-culverins; 8 × sakers

Elizabeth was a 32/38-gun fourth rate vessel of the Kingdom of England, one of four new frigates ordered and built under the 1647 Programme (the others were the Dragon, Phoenix and Tiger). Her initial commission was in the Parliamentary Naval Force during the English Civil War. During the First Anglo-Dutch War, she missed all the major Fleet actions as much of the time she was in the Mediterranean. During the Second Anglo-Dutch War, she participated in the St James Day Fight. She was burnt by the Dutch off Virginia in March 1667.

Elizabeth was the second vessel to be given that name in the English Navy, since it had been used for a 16-gun vessel, in service from 1577 to 1588.

== Construction and specifications ==
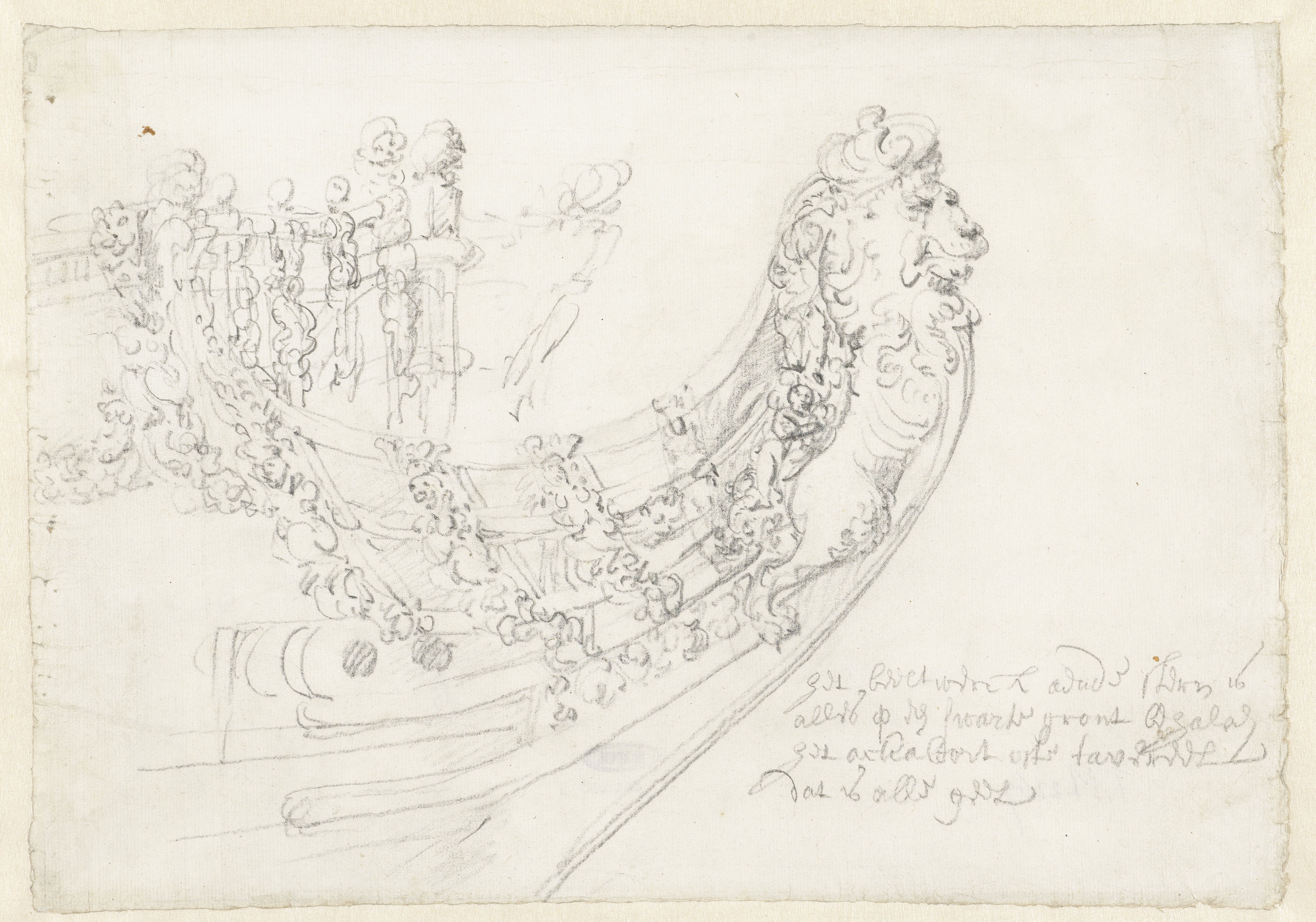
Dutch portrait of the prow of an English ship (the Elizabeth), Willem van de Velde

She was built at Deptford Dockyard on the River Thames under the guidance of Master Shipwright Peter Pett I. She was launched in 1647. Her dimensions were 101 feet 6 inches (30.9 metres) keel length with a breadth of 29 feet 8 inches (9.0 metres) and a depth in hold of 14 feet 10 inches (4.5 metres). Her builder's measure tonnage was calculated as 47515/94 tons.

Her gun armament in 1647 was 32 guns, but by 1652 she was armed with 38 guns. In 1666, her armament was 42 (wartime)/32 (peacetime) and consisted of twelve culverins (Note: The culverin was a gun of 4,500 pounds with a 5.5-inch bore firing a 17.5-pound shot with a twelve-pound powder charge) and ten demi-culverines on the lower deck, (Note: The demi-culverin was a gun of 3,400 pounds with a four-inch bore firing a 9.5-pound shot with an eight-pound powder charge) and ten more demi-culverins and ten sakers on the upper deck. (Note: The sacar or saker was a gun of 1,400 pounds with a 3.5-inch bore firing a 5.5-pound shot with a 5.5-pound powder charge) Her manning was 150 personnel in 1652 and rose to 160 a year later. By 1660 her manning had dropped to 130 personnel.

== Commissioned service ==
=== Service in the English Civil War and Commonwealth Navy ===
She was commissioned into the Parliamentary Naval Force in 1648 under the command of Captain Jonas Reeves. She was at the recapture of the 14-gun Crescent in November 1648. The following year she participated in the blockade of Kinsale, Ireland in 1649. She sailed with Robert Blake's Fleet off Cadiz in 1650. She followed this with operations in the English Channel in 1651. After being incorporated into the Commonwealth Navy, she sailed with Badiley's Squadron to the Mediterranean in 1652. On 28 August 1652, she was at the Battle of Elba (Montecristo), a Dutch victory with the squadron seeking shelter at Elba. She was at the action off Leghorn on 4 March 1653. Later in 1653, she was under command of Captain Christopher Myngs back in home waters. She was in the Sound during the winter of 1653/54. In 1656, she was under command of Captain Robert Coleman. In 1659, she was under Captain John Grimsditch for operations in the Sound.

=== Service after the Restoration May 1660 ===
In June 1660, still under Captain Grimsditch, she carried out operations in the Straits. On 1 May 1664, she was under Captain Edward Nixon until his death on 17 May 1665. On 18 May 1665, she was under command of Captain Robert Robinson at Tangier. She captured a Dutch merchantman in the English Channel. On 9 April 1666, she was under Captain Charles Talbot for a convoy to Lisbon. She returned in May 1666. She was a member of Blue Squadron, Van Division at the St James Day Fight on 25 July 1666. On 19 August 1666, she came under command of Captain John Lightfoot for convoy duty off Virginia.

== Loss ==
Elizabeth was burnt in action with four warships of the Dutch off Jamestown, Virginia in the Penobscot River on 5 June 1667. The Dutch boarded and burnt her, and also burnt or captured some eighteen merchant vessels also moored in the river awaiting being formed into a convoy. Captain Lightfoot was court-martialled and found guilty of negligence; he was imprisoned for one year and dismissed from the service, although he continued to serve in the early 1670s before disappearing in records.
