= English ship Assurance (1646) =

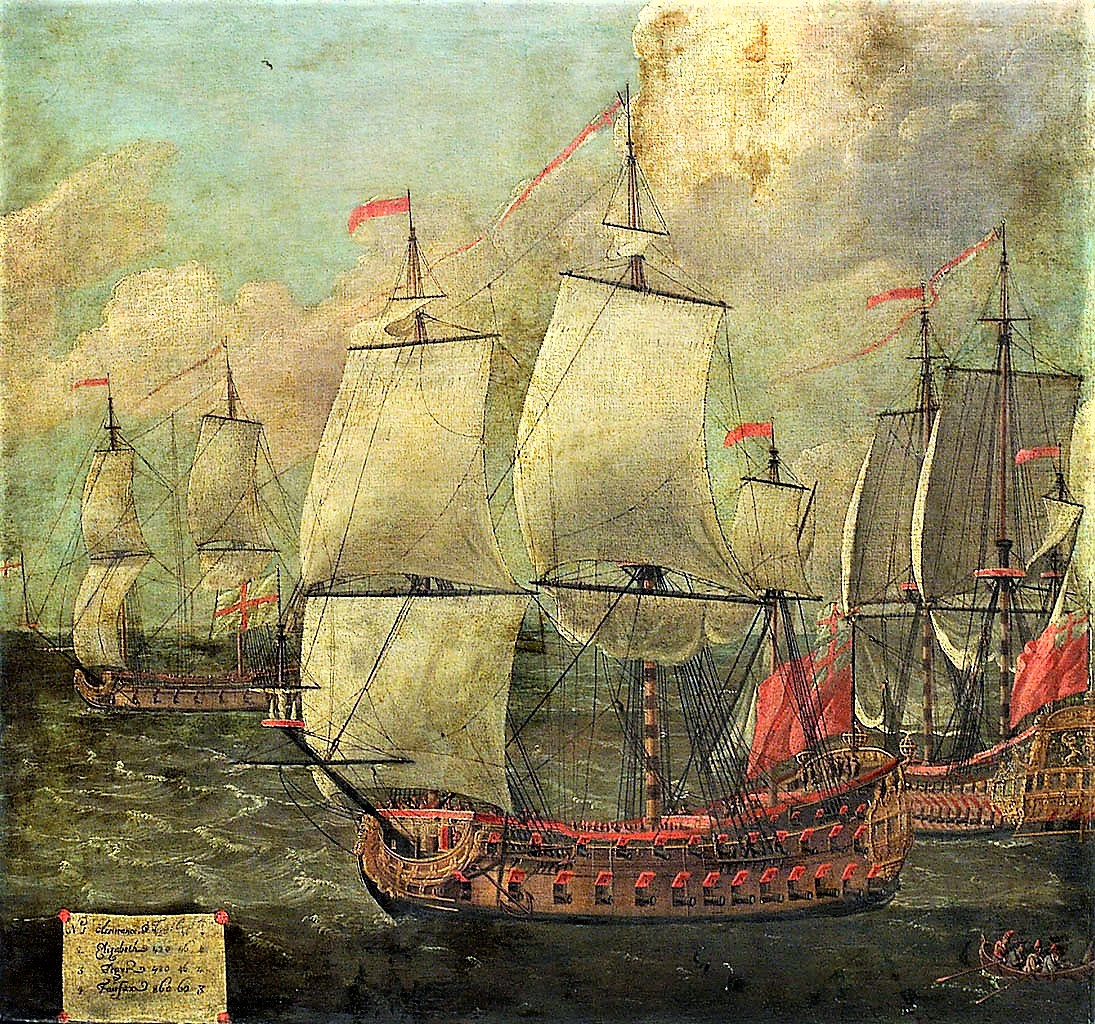
- The Fairfax (at the forefront), with Elizabeth astern of her, and Assurance or Tiger to their left, a painting attributed to Isaac Sailmaker. A ship is missing as part of the picture has been lost.

History

England
- Name: Assurance
- Ordered: December 1645
- Builder: Peter Pett I, Deptford
- Launched: 1646
- Commissioned: 1646
- Honours and awards: Dover 1652; Kentish Knock 1652; Portland 1653; Gabbard 1653; Scheveningen 1653; Lowestoffe 1665; Four Days' Battle 1666; Oxfordness 1666; Schooneveld 1673; Texel 1673
- Fate: Sold to break up, 1698

General characteristics
- Class & type: 32-gun fourth-rate frigate
- Tons burthen: 34081/94 bm originally, 40040/94 bm after girdling
- Length: 106 ft 7 in (32.49 m) on gundeck; 89 ft 0 in (27.13 m) keel for tonnage
- Beam: 26 ft 10 in (8.18 m) originally, 29 ft 1 in (8.86 m) after girdling
- Depth of hold: 13 ft 6 in (4.11 m) originally, 11 ft 3 in (3.43 m) after girdling
- Sail plan: ship-rigged
- Complement: 190/160/120 by 1666
- Armament: at launch; 32 guns; 1666 Establishment; 10 culverins; 26 demi-culverins; 4 sakers; 1677 Establishment; 20 demi-culverins; 18 6-pdr guns; 4 sakers; in 1685; 10 culverins; 12 demi-culverins; 16 sakers; 4 3-pdr guns

Assurance was a 32-gun fourth-rate of the English Navy, built by Peter Pett I at Deptford Dockyard and launched in 1646. She was in the Parliamentary force during the English Civil War, then served as part of the Commonwealth Navy. During her time in the Commonwealth Navy she partook in the Battles of Dover, Portland, Gabbard and Texel. She foundered in a gale at Woolwich in 1660 and was salved. After the Restoration she was incorporated into the new Royal Navy and took part in the Battle of Lowestoft in 1665, the Four Days' Battle in 1666, and the Battle of Texel in 1673. She was reduced to a Fifth Rate in 1690 before being sold in 1698. Assurance was the second vessel to carry that name, since it had been used for a 48-gun galleon named Hope launched at Deptford in 1559, rebuilt and renamed Assurance in 1604 and broken up in 1645.

== Construction and specifications ==
She was ordered in December 1645 from Deptford Dockyard to be built under the supervision of Master Shipwright Peter Pett I. She was launched in 1646. Her dimensions were 106 feet 7 inches (32.5 metres) length of gundeck, 89 feet 0 inches (27.1 metres) length of keel for tonnage, breadth 26 feet 10 inches (8.2 metres), depth in hold 13 feet 6 inches (4.1 metres), with a draught of 13 feet 9 inches (4.2 metres). The tonnage calculation was thus 34081/94 tons. She was subsequently girdled to improve stability, raising her breadth to 29 feet 1 inch (8.9 metres), her depth in hold dropped to 11 feet 3 inches (3.4 metres) and her tonnage rose to 40040/94 bm. A later report quoted her with a burthen tonnage of 456, signifying a possible later re-girdling to a breadth of 31 feet 0 inches (9.4 metres).

Her /armament varied during her time as a fourth rate. When she was launched she had 32 guns, with 11 pairs of gunports on the single gundeck. In 1666 she carried 38 guns: ten culverins, (Note: A culverin was a gun of 4,500 pounds with a 5.5-inch bore firing a 17.5-pound shot with a 12-pound powder charge.) twenty-four demi-culverins (Note: A demi-culverin was a gun of 3,400 pounds with a four-inch bore firing a 9.5-pound shot with an eight-pound powder charge.) and four sakers. (Note: A sacar or saker was a gun of 1,400 pounds with a 3.5-inch bore firing a 5.5-pound shot with a 5.5-pound powder charge.) By this time she had a full-length upper deck, with 11 pairs of gunports, plus 2 pairs on the quarterdeck for sakers or 3-pounders. In 1677 her gun armament was 42 guns in wartime and 38 guns in peacetime. Her armament consisted of twenty demi-culverins, eighteen 6-pounder guns and four sakers. In 1685 her armament was 42 guns consisting of ten culverins, twelve demi-culverins, sixteen 6-pounder guns and four 3-pounder guns. She was completed with an initial cost of £2,352 (Note: The cost accounting for inflation of approximately £483,400 in reference to today.) or 336 tons @ £7 (Note: The cost accounting for inflation of approximately £1,400 in reference to today.) per ton.

== Commissioned service ==
=== Service in the English Civil War ===
She was commissioned in 1646 for service with the Parliamentary forces under Captain William Penn for service in the Winter Guard through 1647. She was in the Irish Sea in 1647 through 1649.

=== Service in the Commonwealth Navy ===
In 1650 she was under the command of Captain Benjamin Blake with Robert Blake's Fleet at Tagus. She took a 28-gun Portuguese frigate in single combat in October 1650. She returned home in 1650. She again was under Captain Penn in the Mediterranean in 1651. At the Battle of Dover she was a member of Rear-Admiral Nehemiah Bourne's squadron of nine ships on 19 May 1652. This battle is sometimes recorded as the Battle of Goodwin Sands. At the Battle of Kentish Knock she was a member of Robert Blake's Fleet of sixty-eight ships on 28 September 1652. Then she was under Captain Robert Sanders at the Battle of Portland. Later in 1653 Captain Philip Holland took command. She partook in the Battle of the Gabbard as a member of White Squadron, Rear Division on 2/3 June 1653. This fight was followed by the Battle of Scheveningen where she was a member of White Squadron, Rear Division on 31 July 1653. She was off the Dutch coast for the winter of 1653/54. She joined Robert Blake's Fleet in the Mediterranean in August 1655, remaining with him until July 1656 when she returned home for service in the English Channel. She partook in operations in the Sound in 1659. She foundered at Woolwich on 9 December 1660 with the loss of 20 of her crew. Samuel Pepys states in his diary that Assurance sank near Woolwich during a storm in December 1660, with the loss of twenty men. He visited the site a few days later. The ship was subsequently refloated by 17 December.

=== Service after the Restoration in 1660 ===
On 4 May 1661 she was under the command of John Tyrwhitt and was with the Earl of Sandwich's squadron at Tangiers, then Algiers on 31 July. She was with Lawson's squadron in the Mediterranean later in the year. On 7 September 1664 she was under command of Captain John Jeffereys. She partook in the Battle of Lowestoft as a member of White Squadron, Center Division on 3 June 1665. On 18 June she was under Captain Philmon Bacon She was in action on 3/4 September 1665 and captured the 50-gun Westfriesland. On 18 September 1665 she was under the command of Captain Thomas Guy. She participated in the Battle of the Galloper Sand (also known as the Four Days' Battle) in Prince Rupert's Squadron, Van Division on 4 June 1666 losing 3 killed with 4 wounded.

Captain John Narborough took command on 11 June 1666. She was at the Battle of Orfordness as a member of White Squadron, Center Division on 25 July 1666. She was also present in the attack on Dutch shipping in the Vlie (also known as Holmes's Bonfire) on 9/10 August 1666. In June 1667 she sailed for the West Indies with Rear Admiral John Harmon's Squadron for Martinique. She was in action there on 24/25 June before returning to Home Waters. Captain Ralph Lassells took command on 15 May 1672. She was at the Battles of Schooneveld as part of Red Squadron, Rear Division first on 28 May and then 4 June 1673. She was at the Battle of Texel on 11 August 1673. Captain Sir Robert Robinson took command on 1 May 1676 for service in the Mediterranean. She moved to the English Channel under Captain Thomas Lovell who took command on 14 May 1678 for service in the English Channel. On 19 May 1680 she was under Captain Stephen Akerman and sailed for Newfoundland, then later was in the Soundings and finally with the Herring convoy in 1682/83. 24 May 1688 saw Captain Randall M'Donald in Command with Dartmouth's Fleet. Captain M'Donald was dismissed on 13 December 1688. In 1689 she was under command of Captain Simon Foulkes off Dunkirk. In 1690 Captain John Mayne was her commander with the Fleet. Also in 1690 she was reduced to a Fifth Rate. In 1691 Captain Isaac Townsend took command and sailed to Virginia in 1692. Captain John Price followed by Captain William Fazeby were her commanders as she served as guardship at Sheerness.

== Disposition ==
Assurance was sold in 1698.
