= English ship Tyger =

British warship wrecked in 1742

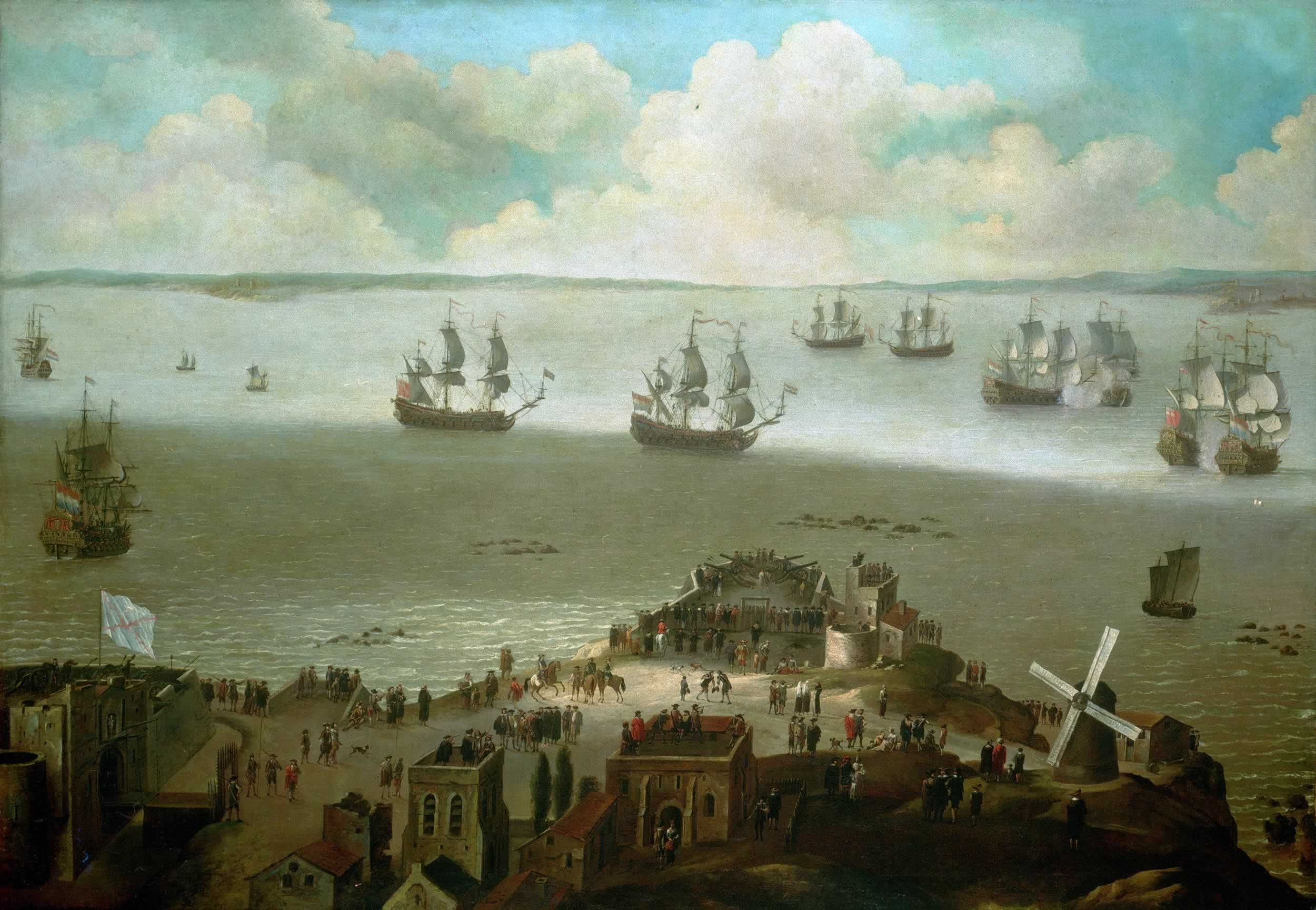
- Tyger engaging Schakerloo in Cadiz harbour in 1674

History

Great Britain
- Name: Tyger
- Builder: Peter Pett I, Woolwich
- Launched: 1647
- Fate: Wrecked, 1742
- Notes: Participated in: Battle of Solebay

General characteristics as built
- Class & type: 38-gun fourth rate frigate
- Tons burthen: 453
- Length: 99 ft (30.2 m) (keel)
- Beam: 29 ft 4 in (8.9 m)
- Depth of hold: 14 ft 8 in (4.5 m)
- Propulsion: Sails
- Sail plan: Full-rigged ship
- Armament: 38 guns (at launch); 40 guns (1677)

General characteristics after 1681 rebuild
- Class & type: 44-gun fourth rate ship of the line
- Tons burthen: 448
- Length: 123 ft 8 in (37.7 m) (gundeck)
- Beam: 32 ft 10 in (10.0 m)
- Depth of hold: 13 ft 6 in (4.1 m)
- Propulsion: Sails
- Sail plan: Full-rigged ship
- Armament: 44 guns of various weights of shot

General characteristics after 1702 rebuild
- Class & type: 46-54-gun fourth rate ship of the line
- Tons burthen: 613
- Length: 124 ft 8 in (38.0 m) (gundeck)
- Beam: 33 ft 4.5 in (10.2 m)
- Depth of hold: 13 ft 9 in (4.2 m)
- Propulsion: Sails
- Sail plan: Full-rigged ship
- Armament: 46-54 guns of various weights of shot

General characteristics after 1722 rebuild
- Class & type: 1706 Establishment 50-gun fourth rate ship of the line
- Tons burthen: 712
- Length: 130 ft (39.6 m) (gundeck)
- Beam: 35 ft (10.7 m)
- Depth of hold: 14 ft (4.3 m)
- Propulsion: Sails
- Sail plan: Full-rigged ship
- Complement: 281 officers and men (including 57 marines)
- Armament: 50 guns: Gundeck: 22 × 18 pdrs; Upper gundeck: 22 × 9 pdrs; Quarterdeck: 4 × 6 pdrs; Forecastle: 2 × 6 pdrs

Tyger, often spelled Tiger, was a 38-gun fourth-rate frigate of the Royal Navy. Designed by Peter Pett, she was built at Woolwich Dockyard and launched in 1647. The term 'frigate' during the period of this ship referred to a method of construction, rather than a role which did not develop until the following century. Tyger was the third ship of the Royal Navy to bear the name, and by successive rebuildings she served for almost a century until the vessel was wrecked in the Dry Tortugas in 1742. The ship's crew was stranded on Garden Key for 56 days, fighting off Spanish attempts to capture them, and then spent another 56 days sailing 700 miles (1,100 km) in small boats to Port Royal, Jamaica. The captain and three of his lieutenants were court-martialed over the wreck and subsequent events.

== History ==
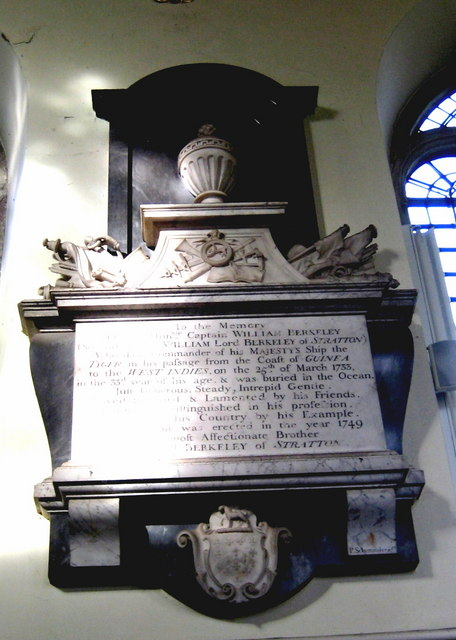
Monument to William Berkeley in the Church of St Mary, Bruton, Somerset. He was captain of Tyger in 1733 when he died and was buried at sea

Tyger served in many actions in a career of nearly 100 years, including the Siege of Colchester during the English Civil War, the pursuit of Prince Rupert to the West Indies, and the First and Second Anglo–Dutch Wars (including the Battle of Solebay). Commanded by Captain John Harman, Tyger is famous for winning the final battle of the Third Anglo-Dutch War in a single-ship action against the 28-gun Dutch privateer Schakerloo captained by Paschier De Witte. The event was witnessed to by throngs of spectators in the neutral port of Cadiz for hours while Schakerloo attempted to board Tyger several times but was repelled each time with heavy losses until the Dutch ship finally struck her colors. In the end Harmon was wounded but lost only 24 men while the crew of Schakerloo lost 50 killed and 70 wounded. Tyger served in the Mediterranean, in the defense of Gibraltar, in actions against Guadeloupe and Martinique and the blockade of Cartagena, Colombia in 1741.

Tyger was rebuilt for the first time in 1681 by John Shish at Deptford Dockyard as a 44-gun fourth rate ship of the line. She was rebuilt a second time at Rotherhithe in 1702, as a fourth rate of 46-54 guns. Her final rebuild was at Sheerness Dockyard, where she was relaunched on 12 November 1722 as a 50-gun fourth rate to the 1706 Establishment.

== Shipwreck ==
In December 1741 Tyger was assigned to blockade duty off the western tip of Cuba, under the command of Captain Edward Herbert. He had learned from the captured crew of a small Cuban sailing vessel (a periagua) that Spanish ships were preparing to sail in both directions between Havana, Cuba and Vera Cruz, Mexico. Early in 1742, eager to capture a valuable prize, Captain Herbert left his assigned station to move closer to the expected path of the shipping between Havana and Vera Cruz.

On 11 January, the Tyger approached low-lying islands. The officers became confused, first correctly identifying the islands as the Dry Tortugas, and then mistakenly identifying them as the Reques Keys on the Grand Bahama Bank. That night the ship grounded on a reef. The ship was successfully backed off the reef, but there was no anchor ready to be dropped, and the ship ran upon the reef again, this time for good.

The ship's crew transferred to Garden Key, taking food and water with them. A rumor spread among the men that, since the ship was wrecked and they were on dry land, they were free of naval discipline. Captain Herbert told the men that they were still under naval authority, and that all needed to work together to save themselves. A camp was established on the island, using sailcloth for tents to shelter men and supplies. On 18 January, the ship's longboat, with nine men, sailed for New Providence in the Bahamas to seek help for the stranded crew. The voyage was expected to be short, as the officers still believed they had wrecked on the Reques Keys, in the Bahamas.

Fearing discovery by the Spanish, Captain Herbert had the 9-pounder and 6-pounder guns moved to the island from the ship and installed on newly constructed gun platforms. The 18-pounder guns were raised from the main deck (which was now at the waterline of the partially sunken ship) to the upper deck, so that they could be used to defend the camp on the island.

Three weeks after the longboat left, the ship's yawl, with eight men under the command of Second Lieutenant Craig, also sailed to seek help from New Providence. After sailing about 100 miles (160 km), the yawl reached what Lieutenant Craig recognized as the "islands of Cape Florida" (the upper Florida Keys), where the yawl encountered some Spanish boats. A Spanish sloop chased the yawl, and Lieutenant Craig decided to return to Garden Key. Captain Herbert immediately sent a force of seamen and marines to try to capture some of the Spanish boats. The expedition found an abandoned, heavily damaged sloop which they were able to sail back to Garden Key.

== Discovery by the Spanish ==
On 20 February a Spanish half-galley approached the wreck of the Tyger. The men working on the wreck retreated to shore and the company prepared to defend itself. The Spanish, however, merely scavenged some spars from the wreck to replace their mast and sailed away the next day. Two days later a Spanish sloop approached Garden Key. The crew set fire to the wreck of the Tyger and again prepared to defend themselves. During a parley under a flag of truce, the Spanish informed the English that their longboat had been captured, with three of the crew killed and the rest imprisoned in Havana. After an offer of food and water was refused by the Tyger, the Spanish sloop sailed away. In 1743 the Governor of Cuba claimed, in connection with the wreck of the Tyger, that the Spanish had attacked and taken a launch and a sloop, and killed twelve Englishmen.

The crew had been on reduced-rations since the end of the first week on the island. Some of the crewmen, noting that there were ample supplies of water and rum, went to the captain to ask for an increase in their rations, but he chased them off with threats. The men then asked Royal Marine Lieutenant Scott to intercede for them. When Scott presented a petition to Captain Herbert on behalf of the men, Herbert had Scott arrested. The captain then explained to the crew that he did not know how long it would be until they could leave the island, and then read them the Articles of War. The next day the captain increased the water ration by one pint per man.

On 7 March the Spanish sloop returned to the island. Although the sloop was well-armed and manned, Captain Herbert resolved to try to capture it. A total of 96 men boarded the captain's barge, the yawl, a periagua (three periaguas had been captured near Cuba and carried on the Tyger) and a canoe and attacked the sloop. Although the boarding parties reached the deck of the sloop, the Spanish were able to force them back and sail away. The barge was sunk and several men wounded, but none of the Tyger's crew were killed.

== Voyage to Jamaica and court-martial ==
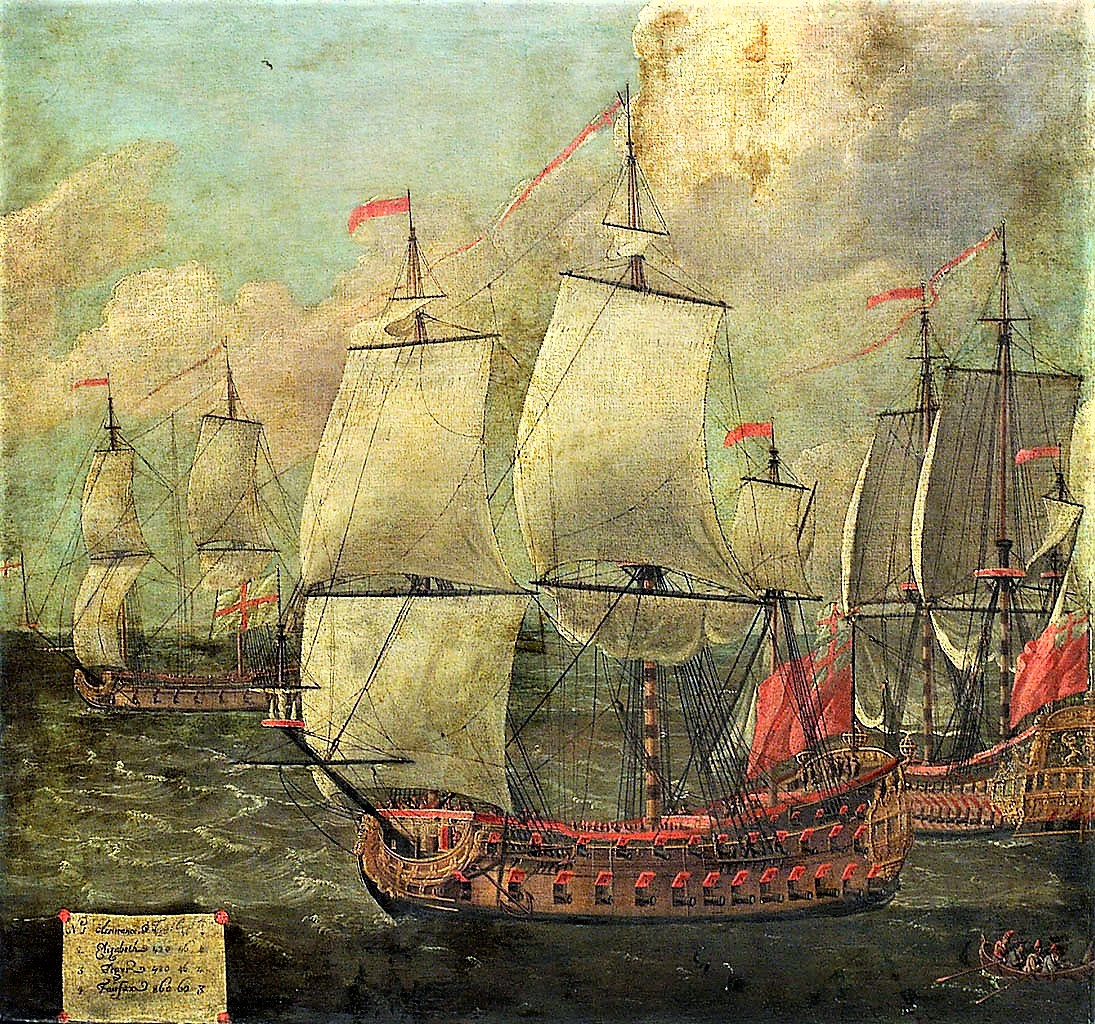
The Fairfax (at the forefront), with Elizabeth astern of her, and Assurance or 'Tiger' to their left, a painting attributed to Isaac Sailmaker. A ship is missing as part of the picture has been lost.

Preparations were made to leave Garden Key. The salvaged sloop was repaired, and one periagua was lengthened and rigged as a schooner. On 19 March the crew of the Tyger boarded the sloop, the schooner rigged periagua, the yawl, the two other periaguas and the canoe, and set sail for Port Royal. The canoe capsized and sank after only two days, but its crew were rescued by one of the other boats. The little fleet rounded the western end of Cuba and reached the Cayman Islands in two weeks, but was then becalmed for three weeks. Captain Herbert then sent the schooner, which was a slow sailer, along the southern coast of Cuba, while the sloop towed the rest of the boats directly to Jamaica. After six days they reached the western end of Jamaica, where they were able to obtain water and supplies, but it took another three weeks to reach Port Royal.

In Port Royal Captain Herbert brought charges against Lieutenants Craig and Dennis for "remissness of duty" in the attack on the Spanish sloop, and against Lieutenant Scott for "mutinous behavior". A court-martial was convened to try the lieutenants, as well as Captain Herbert for the loss of his ship. Based on the testimony of crewmen and the ship's surgeon, Lieutenants Craig and Dennis were acquitted of the charges. The court found that Lieutenant Scott had acted out of inexperience and impudence, rather than mutinous intent, and sentenced him to a severe reprimand. Captain Herbert was found guilty of leaving his assigned patrol station, and of not having prepared an anchor to be dropped when the Tyger had entered shallow water, and thus losing his ship. In consideration of Captain Herbert's leadership in saving his crew and bringing them safely to Jamaica, he was sentenced only to loss of all pay for his service on the Tyger, and the court recommended that he be continued in service in the Royal Navy.

== Rediscovery of wreck ==
The U.S. National Park Service announced on March 14, 2024, that a wreck discovered in 1993 in present-day Dry Tortugas National Park was surveyed by archeologists in 2021 and identified as the Tyger.
