= Michael S. Robinson =

British art historian

Michael Strang Robinson (1910–1999) was Keeper of Pictures at the National Maritime Museum, London, England. He was an expert on the paintings of Willem van de Velde, the elder and Willem van de Velde, the younger.

== Biography ==
Robinson was born in Hamble, Hampshire, England on 20 April 1910. His father, Gregory Robinson, was a painter of seascapes and a founder of the Society for Nautical Research, of which Michael Robinson later became honorary vice-president. As a child, he was a frequent sailor, and as a student at London University, he took a job cataloguing prints for the Royal Naval College in Greenwich. He was hired by the National Maritime Museum in 1934. Robinson joined the King's Royal Rifle Corps in 1930, and during World War II he served in the Special Boat Section of the British Royal Navy. He was captured in Leros, and eventually taken to Stalag IV-B, where he started to learn Dutch. Returning to the National Maritime Museum after the war, Robinson became head of department in 1947. He died in London on 24 December 1999.

== Published works ==
- A pageant of the sea: the Macpherson collection of maritime prints and drawings in the National Maritime Museum, Greenwich (1950)
- Van de Velde drawings: a catalogue of drawings in the National Maritime Museum made by the Elder and the Younger Willem van de Velde (1958)
- The paintings of the Willem van de Veldes: a catalogue of the paintings of the Elder and Younger Willem van de Velde (1990)

== Awards and honours ==
Robinson became an MBE in 1959. He was awarded the Caird Medal of the National Maritime Museum in 1985. He became a member of the Order of Orange-Nassau in 1990.
