= George Geldorp =

Flemish painter

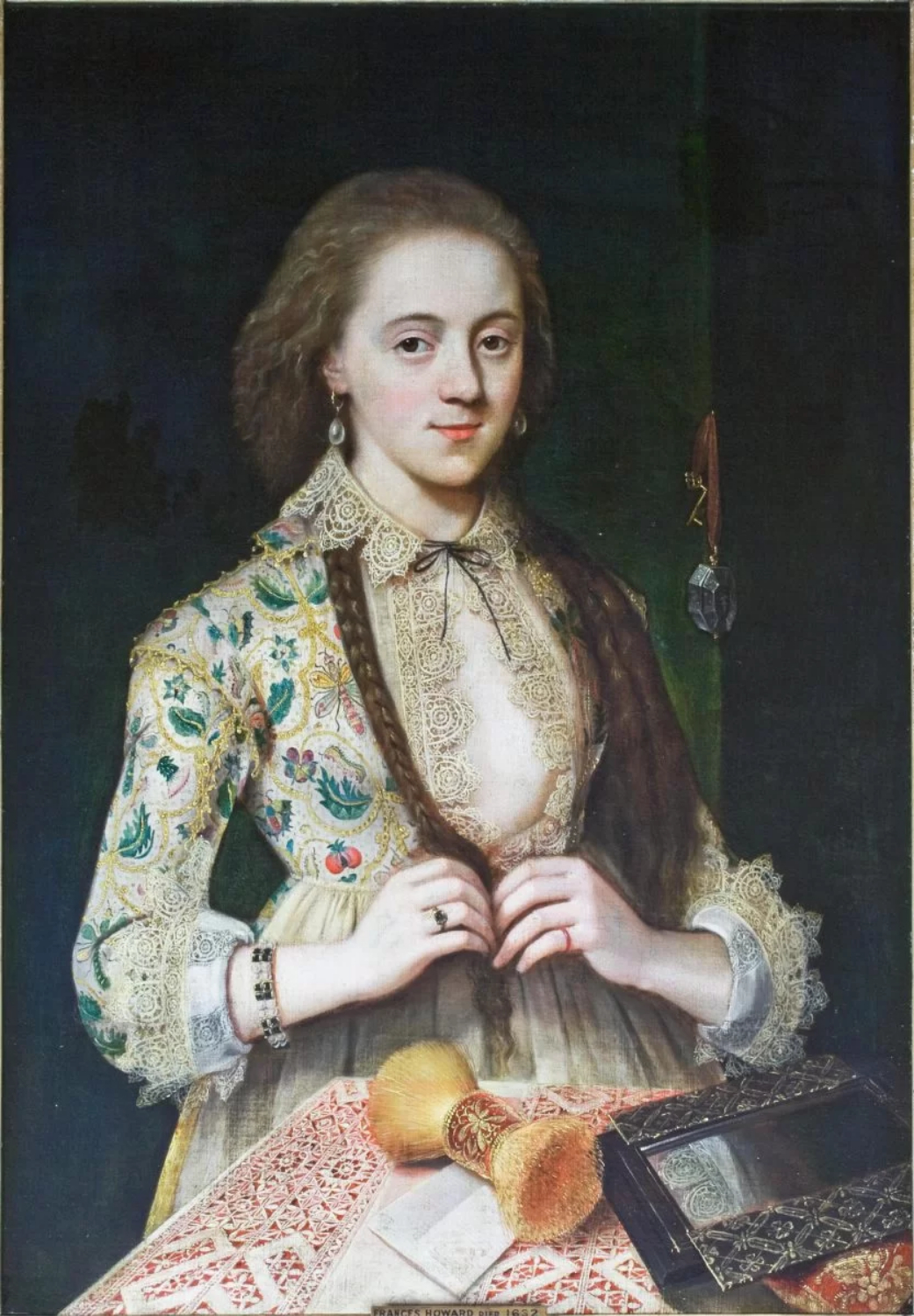
Portrait of an Unknown woman, previously said to be Frances Howard, Countess of Essex and of Somerset

George Geldorp, Georg Geldorp or Jorge Geldorp (1580/1595, Cologne – 14 November 1665, London) was a Flemish painter who was mainly active in England where he was known for his portraits and history paintings. He was also active as an art dealer and impresario.

== Life ==
Geldorp was the son of the Flemish portrait painter Gortzius Geldorp who was originally from Leuven, had trained in Antwerp and later moved to live and work in Cologne. George had two brothers Ferdinand and Melchior who also became painters. Geldorp first trained with his father and worked as a painter in Cologne. He later moved to Antwerp where he was admitted as a master in the Guild of Saint Luke in 1610. Two years later his first wife Margriet Parmentiers died in Antwerp on 27 June 1612 in childbirth. Their daughter Anne Marie later married Remigius van Leemput, a Flemish portrait painter, copyist, collector and art dealer mainly active in England. He remarried in Antwerp on 5 February 1613 with Anna de Vos, a daughter of the painter Willem de Vos.

In 1623, Geldorp moved to London. He worked on the triumphal arch for Charles I's entry into London in 1625. He painted a number of portraits in the Anglo-Netherlandish style, notably of William Cecil, 2nd Earl of Salisbury and his wife Catherine in 1626 (Hatfield House, Hertfordshire) and of Sir Arthur Ingram in late 1638/early 1639.

He was involved in organizing commissions in England for Flemish and Dutch artists including Rubens, Anthony van Dyck and Peter Lely. He was landlord of Peter Lely, Anthony van Dyck and Isaac Sailmaker in London. He rented a house in Blackfriars near van Dyck's studio no later than 1636. On 15 August 1641 he and his wife borrowed 84 pound from van Dyck. This debt was paid off posthumously in 1646. Geldorp had been in business with Van Dyck and also traded in van Dyck copies while living on Orchard Street, Westminster in 1653.He was also an agent for Everard Jabach IV, an art agent and collector of Dutch and Flemish paintings from Cologne but living in Paris, for whom he sourced copies after van Dyck. Most of these copies were produced by his son-in-law Remigius van Leemput. Upon the Restoration, he assisted with the reconstitution of the art collection and possessions of the English royal family and was rewarded for his services with the position of picture mender and cleaner to the King.

He was the teacher of Isaac Sailmaker.

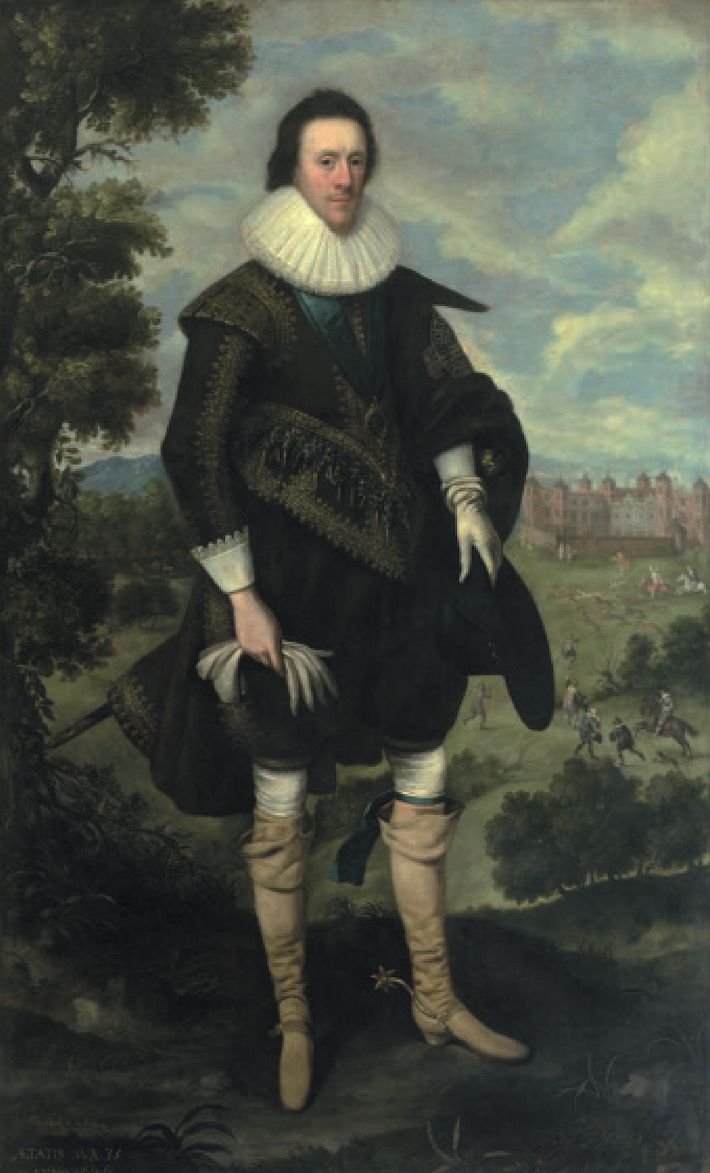
Portrait of William Cecil, 2nd Earl of Salisbury

Geldorp rented a house in Orchard Street from Lawrence Swettnam between 1643 and 1649. He undertook to paint for Swettnam "two good picture to life yearly". The Westminster house was previously occupied by the painters Alexander Keirincx and Cornelis van Poelenburgh.

== Work ==
George Geldorp was a portrait specialist. His portraits are regarded as less accomplished and more stiffly articulated than those of contemporary painters active in London such as Daniel Mijtens. The surfaces of his paintings are decorative. The background of the Portrait of William Cecil, 2nd Earl of Salisbury contains an historically important view of Hatfield House with sportsmen in the foreground.

Geldorp was also active as a collaborator and copyist of Anthony van Dyck and later Peter Lely. In June 1640, Rachel Bourchier, Countess of Bath paid "Mr Gelthorpe" £12 for a picture of Elizabeth, Lady Peterborough, probably a copy after van Dyck.

The Dutch biographer Arnold Houbraken reported that Geldorp was known to the artist biographer Joachim von Sandrart. Von Sandrart had written that Geldorp was not a very accomplished draughtsman and had the habit of tracing other's sketches, and then pricking holes in these sketches, and sponging this onto the canvas as a guide to paint his subjects. Houbraken disapproved of this practise and wrote that he preferred to write about painters who were good draughtsmen.
