= Battle of the James River (1667) =

Battle during the Second Anglo-Dutch War

- Part of the Second Anglo-Dutch War
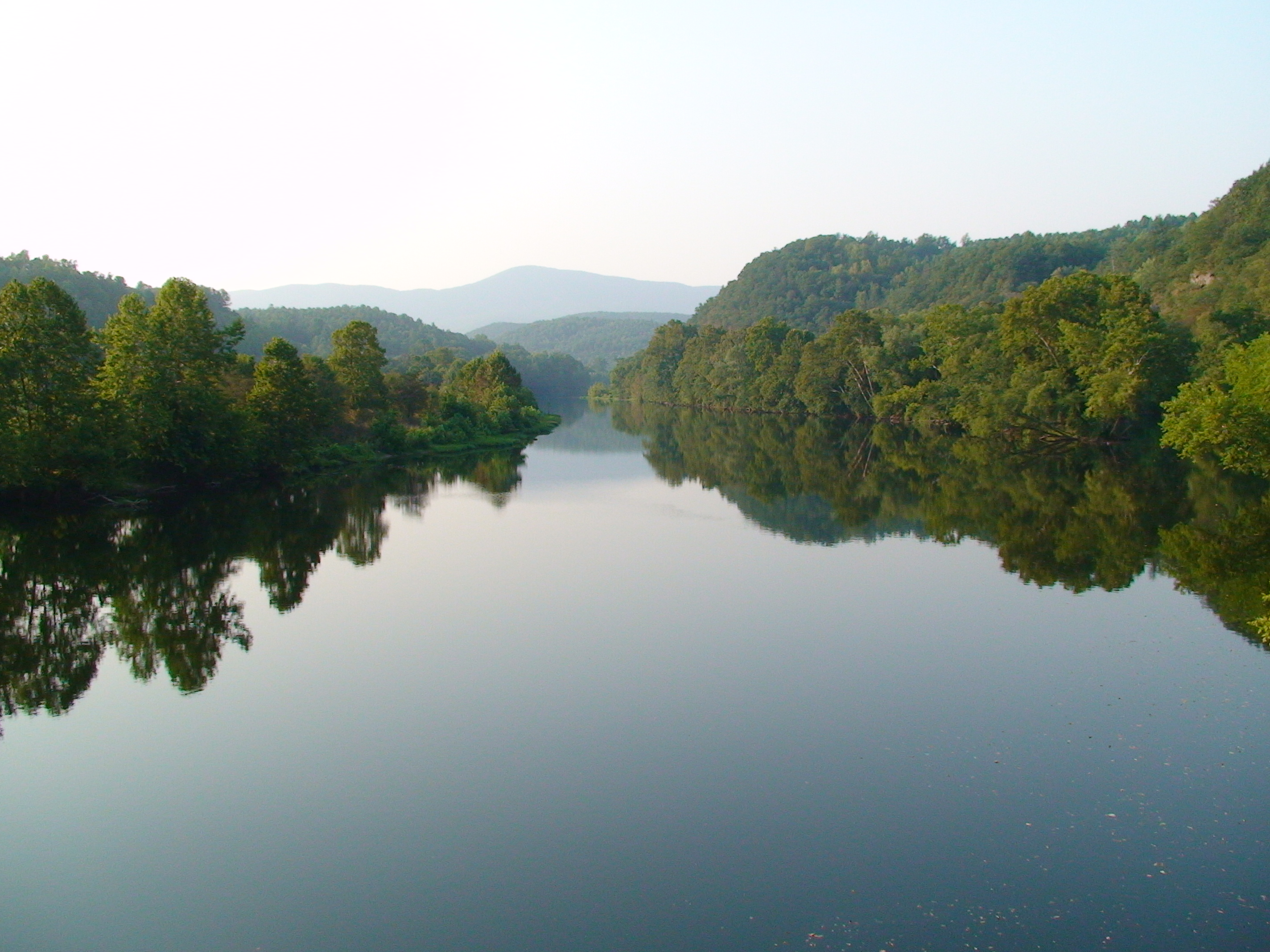
- Present-day James River
Date	June 5 – 9 1667
Location	James River, Jamestown, Virginia
Result	Dutch victory

Belligerents
Dutch Republic	England

Commanders and leaders
(Dutch Republic) Abraham Crijnssen	(England) Captain Lightfoot

Strength
5 ships	1 warship 21 merchant ships

Casualties and losses
Unknown	1 warship sunk 19 merchant ships captured, 2 burned

The Battle of the James River took place in June 1667 during the Second Anglo-Dutch War. A Dutch force of five ships led by Abraham Crijnssen sailed into the James River in Virginia searching for English ships. Merchant ships filled with tobacco were captured, plundered, and burned along with the escort Elizabeth.

== Background ==
During the Second Anglo-Dutch War, the Dutch Republic dispatched Admiral Abraham Crijnssen with a fleet of seven ships on December 30, 1666. His mission was to recapture the Dutch colonies in the West Indies and inflict maximum damage on the enemy in the Atlantic region. The expedition was initiated by Pieter de Huybert, the Grand Pensionary of Zeeland, who hoped to force the enemy into peace negotiations through devastation and ruin. Crijnssen's fleet consisted of three frigates, a yacht, a hoy, a fluyt, and a snauw, crewed by 750 sailors and 225 soldiers.

By sailing along the west coast of Africa, Crijnssen reached the "Wild Coast" of South America in early 1667. On February 25, he Captured Surinam. He stayed in the colony for another month to establish governance before departing with five ships to reclaim Berbice and Tobago, bringing both islands back under Dutch control.

Via Martinique, Crijnssen set course for Guadeloupe, attempting to intercept an English war fleet near Nevis on May 20, 1667. Despite joining forces with a French squadron, their efforts proved unsuccessful. Disappointed by the lack of commitment from the French, Crijnssen redirected his course northward.

== Battle ==
Fate was kind to Crijnssen. Without being discovered he arrived at the Chesapeake Bay in June 1667. One heavily armed merchantman was taken immediately, as was a ship sailing out of the Hudson River. Those on board told him about a large number of ships loaded with tobacco upstream on James River would lie. With the English flag in the top as a stratagem, the Zeelanders went up the river and found twenty ships there guarded by the English warship Elizabeth. The totally surprised Englishman was overpowered, as well as eighteen merchantmen. About five or six thousand tons of tobacco were divided among eleven ships and van provide a prize crew. With this fleet, the journey home accepted.
