= Isaac Sailmaker =

Dutch-born British painter and etcher (1633–1721)

- Isaac Zeilmaker
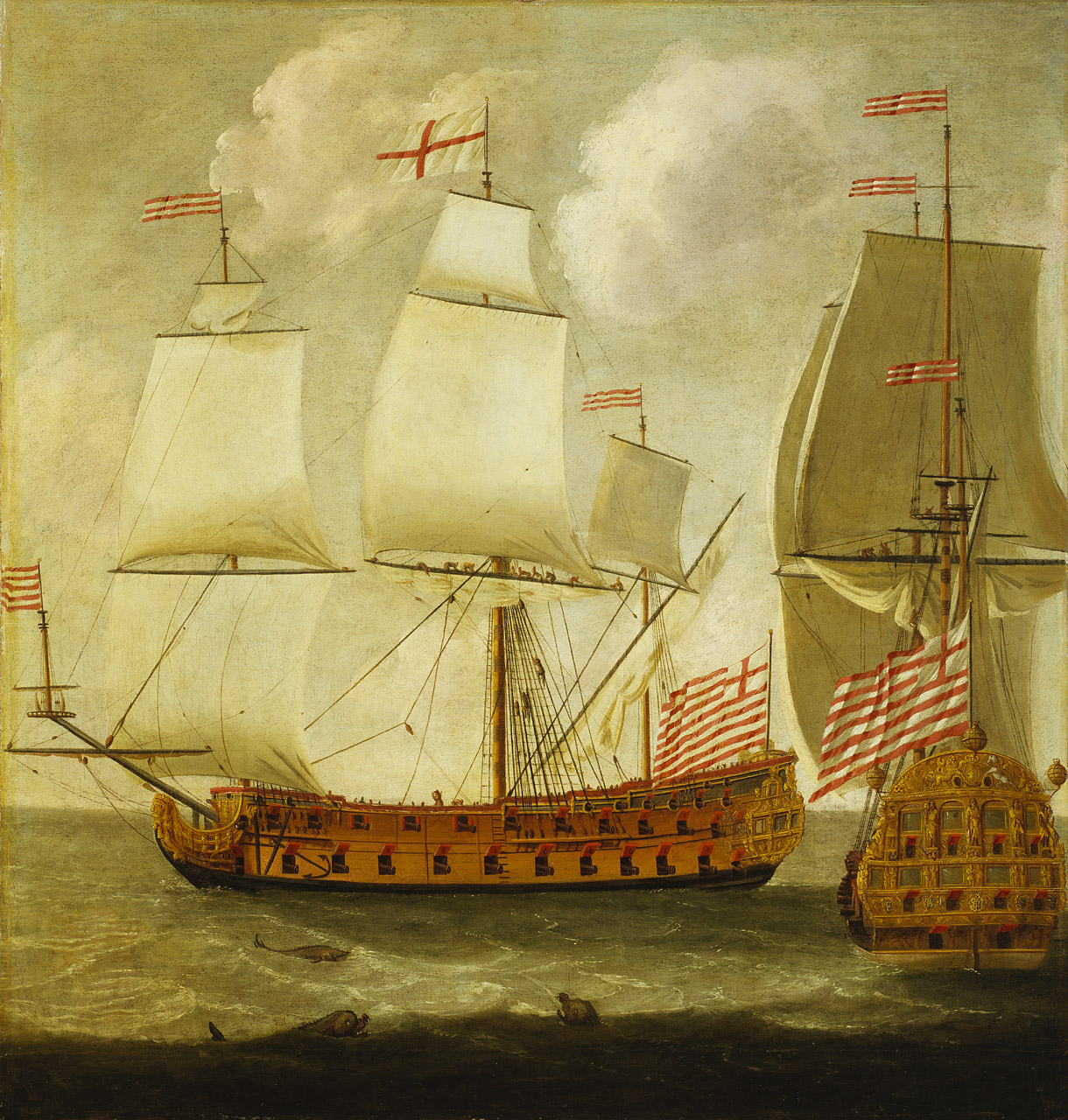
- (c. 1685) Two views of an East Indiaman of the time of King William III (c. 1694), Royal Museums Greenwich
- Born: 1633; Scheveningen, Dutch Republic
- Died: 28 June 1721 (aged 87–88); Temple Bar, London
- Education: An apprentice of George Geldorp; Worked in the studio of Willem van de Velde the Younger
- Known for: Marine painting

Isaac Sailmaker (born Isaac Zeilmaker; 1633 – 28 June 1721) (Note: Also spelt Sailmacker, Saylmaker, and Sylmaker.) was a Dutch-born British painter and etcher who specialised in marine art. He was referred to in contemporary books and journals as "the father of British sea painting", but was eclipsed by his contemporaries, the Dutch marine painters Willem van de Velde the Elder and his son Willem van de Velde the Younger, who for a period dominated the London market. Sailmaker was commissioned by the English Lord Protector, Oliver Cromwell, to paint the English fleet at Fort-Mardyck.

The attribution of Sailmaker's surviving paintings has been problematic, as his works were never signed. Other paintings have been attributed to him on the basis of engravings after his work; his painting of the second Eddystone Lighthouse, built in 1709, was firmly attributed to Sailmaker in the 1970s on the basis of such documentary evidence. His style can also be identified by its reliance on a relatively narrow palette, principally black, greys and greens, and by minor details within his paintings, such as the way he depicted flags and gilding.

== Life ==
What is known about Isaac Sailmaker's life comes from notes published by the 18th century engraver, artist, and antiquary George Vertue. (Note: Vertue wrote: This man was imploy'd to paint for Oliver Cromwell a prospect of the Fleet before Mardyke when it was taken in 1657. Sept. ... This little man imploy'd himself always in painting views small & great of many sea Ports & Shipps about England, he was a constant labourer in that way tho' not very excellent. his contemporaries the Vander Veldes where too mighty for him to cope with. but he outlivd them & painted to his last. he was born at Scheveling came very young into England. and always liv'd here. & died here at his home near the River side without the Temple Gate. call'd the Kings bench Walks. a profil off his picture painted by young Philips. who since paints conversations. — George Vertue, Notebooks, Annual Report of the Walpole Society, volume 18, p. 74)

Sailmaker, whose family name was probably Zeilmaker, was born in 1633 in the village of Scheveningen in the Dutch Republic. He came to London at a young age and became one of the first apprentices of George Geldorp or Gelders, a Flemish portraitist and art dealer who had bought a studio after moving to London from the Dutch Republic. As a portraitist, Geldorp did not provide his young pupil with a typical marine artist's education, and it is unlikely Sailmaker's interest in marine painting was inspired by his teacher.

An exact contemporary of the Dutch marine painter Willem van de Velde the Younger, Sailmaker was eclipsed by van de Velde and his father Willem van de Velde the Elder when they moved to London in the 1670s. Sailmaker, along with Jan van de Hagen, Jacob Knijff, and the most talented of the group, Peter Monamy, were members of the Younger van de Velde's London studio; they all continued van de Velde's artistic style. Sailmaker, who may have been a copyist in the van de Velde studio, outlived both father and son, and was still painting into his eighties. He was one of Britain's earliest marine painters, and was referred to in contemporary catalogues and books as "the father of British sea painting". He was the first marine painter from England to depict naval action involving an English fleet using oils. Sailmaker is known to have for worked for England's Lord Protector, Oliver Cromwell during the 1650s, but most of his known works date from the 1680s. Vertue wrote that Sailmaker "employed himself always in painting views, small and great, many sea-ports and ships about England" and calls him "a constant labourer", which suggests that he produced a large body of work during his lifetime.

At the end of his life, Sailmaker was living in a house along King's Bench Walk in the Temple Bar area of the city of London. He died at home on 28 June 1721.

== Artistic style and attributions ==
Paintings attributed to Sailmaker include ship portraits and depictions of various naval actions. He was commissioned by Cromwell to paint the English fleet at Fort-Mardyck, prior to the fort's capture by an Anglo-French force in September 1657, (Note: In 1657, the French general Turenne commanded an Anglo-French allied force created to mount an invasion of Flanders. He first planned to take the harbour and fort of Mardyke, down the coast from Dunkirk. Mardyke was approached by the allies on 19 September. After blockading the coast to hinder any potential Spaniards relief force, the fort was bombarded and overrun. Mardyke then became an English possession.) but all his commissioned paintings from Cromwell, and also from the politician John Lovett, are now lost. (Note: Cromwell was possibly inspired by discussions of the placement of the Armada Tapestries, previously owned by King Charles I.)

Sailmaker's surviving works reveal that he painted in a basic version of the Dutch style, making portraits of ships side on, stern and bow view. His only contemporary marine artist in England, Monamy, developed a technically advanced style and produced works that were brighter and more colourful than other paintings which emerged from the Van de Velde studio—in comparison to Sailmaker, he was a more competent and realistic artist.

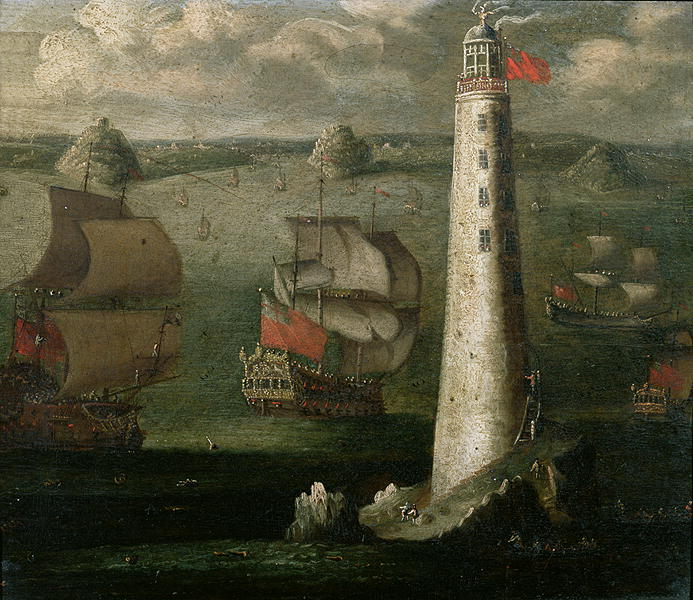
Isaac Sailmaker, Men-o'-War and other Vessels before the Eddystone Lighthouse (undated)

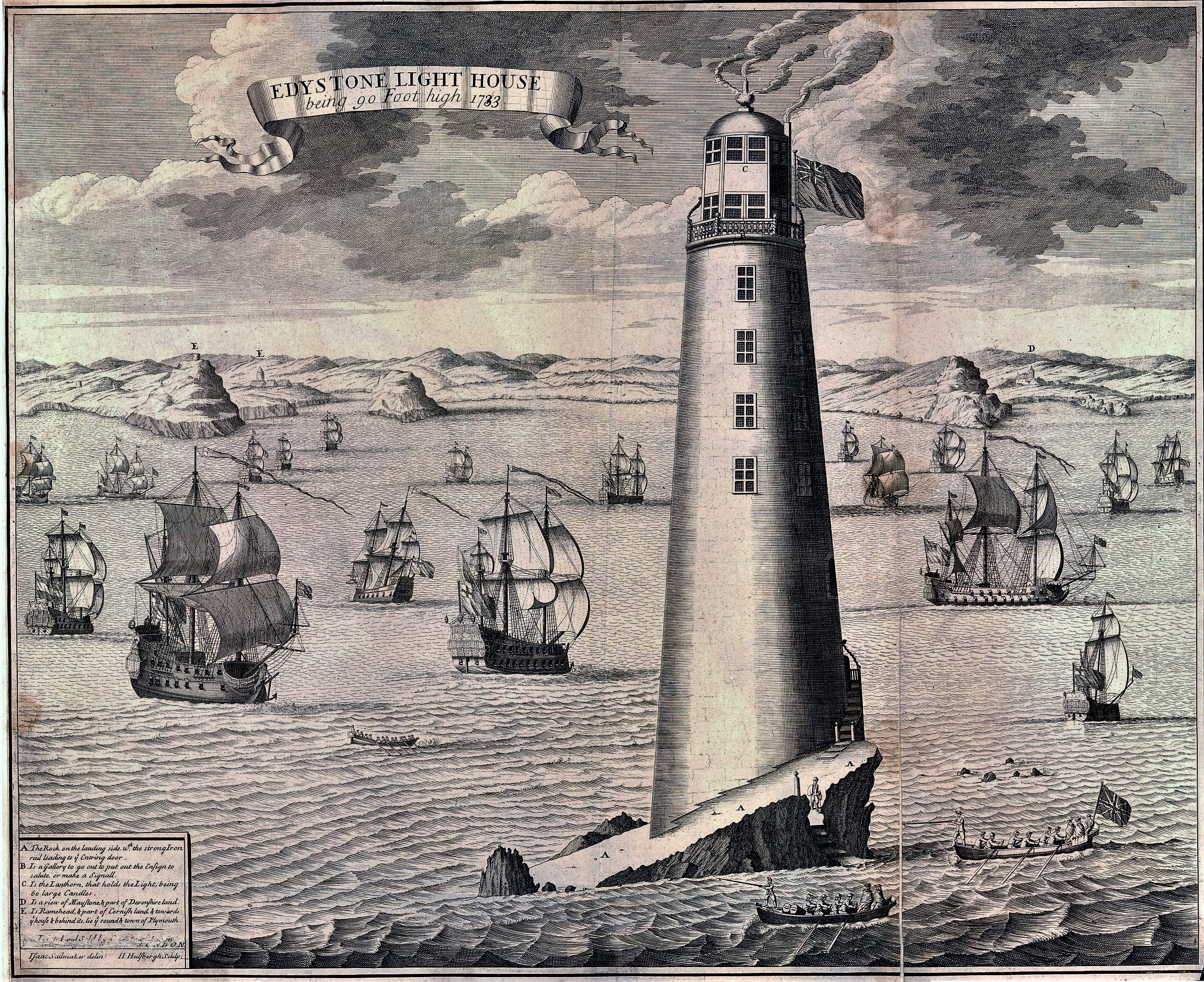
Henry Hulsbergh (after Sailmaker), Edystone Light House (c. 1733), British Museum

An advertisement for an engraving by Sailmaker in the Term Catalogue of November 1692 stated:

GLORIA Britanniae or An exact draught of the large Ship, called the Royal Prince in several postures, drawn by Mr. Isaac Saylmaker. Curiously Engraven upon a Large Copper Plate, above two foot long and a foot and nine inches deep. Price 1s. In large Dutch paper, pasted on paper and coloured, 2s. 6d.

The attribution of his paintings has been problematic for many years, as his surviving works are unsigned. (Note: As of 2000, no signed work by Sailmaker has been discovered.) Paintings originally said to have been created by him were later reattributed to the Dutch painter Jacob Knyff. Sailmaker's identity became uncertain until the 1970s. A contemporary painting of the second Eddystone Lighthouse, built in 1709, was firmly attributed to Sailmaker in the 1970s on the basis of documentary evidence. Other paintings have been attributed to him on the basis of engravings after his work.

Identification of Sailmaker's work is aided by characteristics of his artistic style, such as his depiction of ruffles across ships' flags, his palette, which was limited to variations of grey, green and black, and his method of using raised gold 'blobs' to show the gilding on his ships instead of flat brush strokes.

== Reputation ==
Vertue was somewhat dismissive of Sailmaker's skill as a painter, calling him "not very excellent". Horace Walpole's Anecdotes of Painting in England (1828) mentioned Sailmaker, noting only that he produced a painting commissioned by Cromwell, and that a 1714 engraving of a fleet action was made from one of Sailmaker's works.

The maritime author Edward Keble Chatterton, writing in the 1920s, criticised Sailmaker's depiction of sea waves in his painting of the Battle of Málaga (1704), and noted the complete failure by the artist to portray the sea's awe-inspiring grandeur. He described the work as "this uninspired group of ships and galleys" which "indicates admirably how little was the English painter's skill three years before the younger van de Velde died".

== Gallery ==
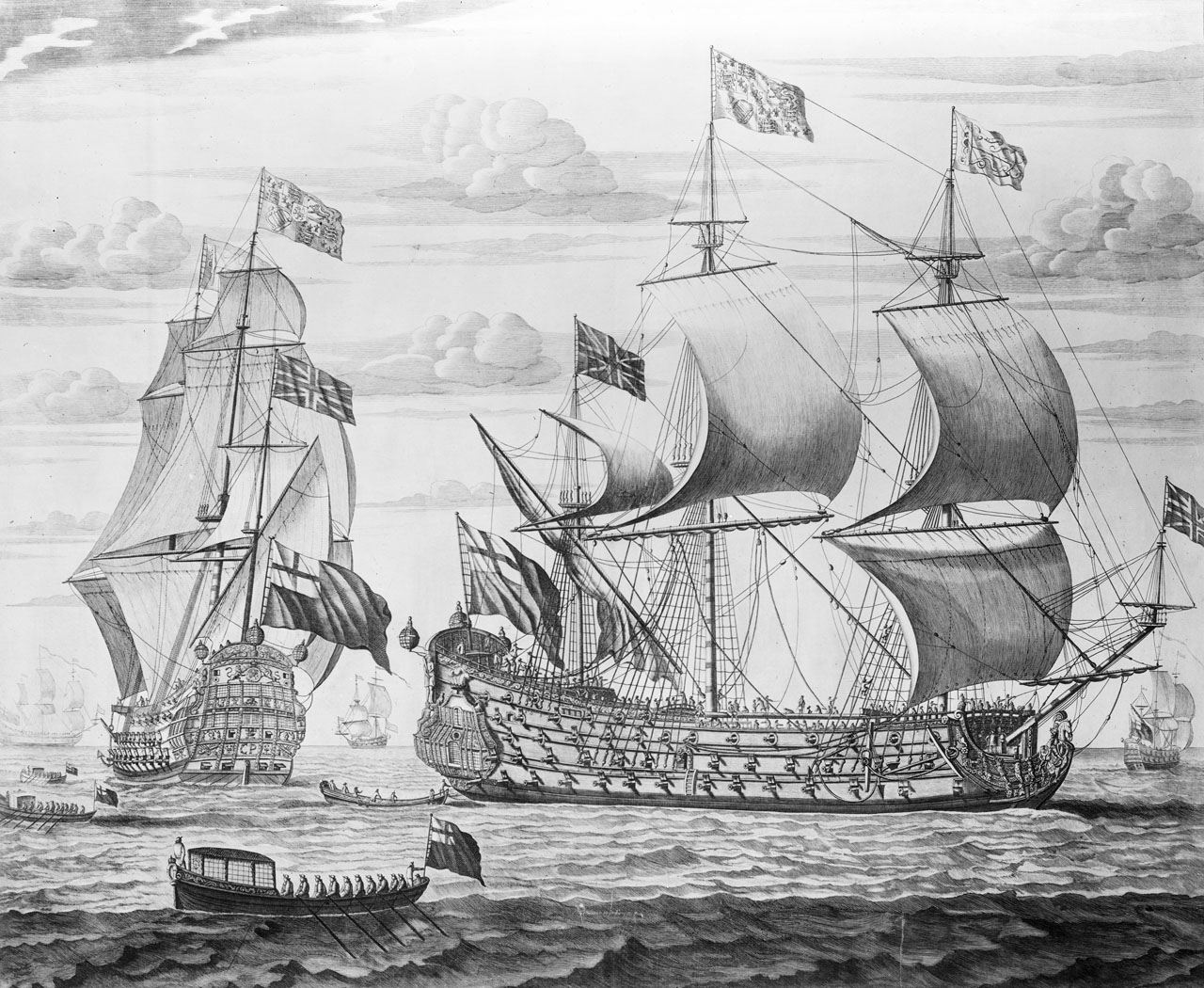
Gloria Brittaniae, or the Royal Prince Built by Sir Phin: Pett at Chatham (1670), Royal Museums Greenwich

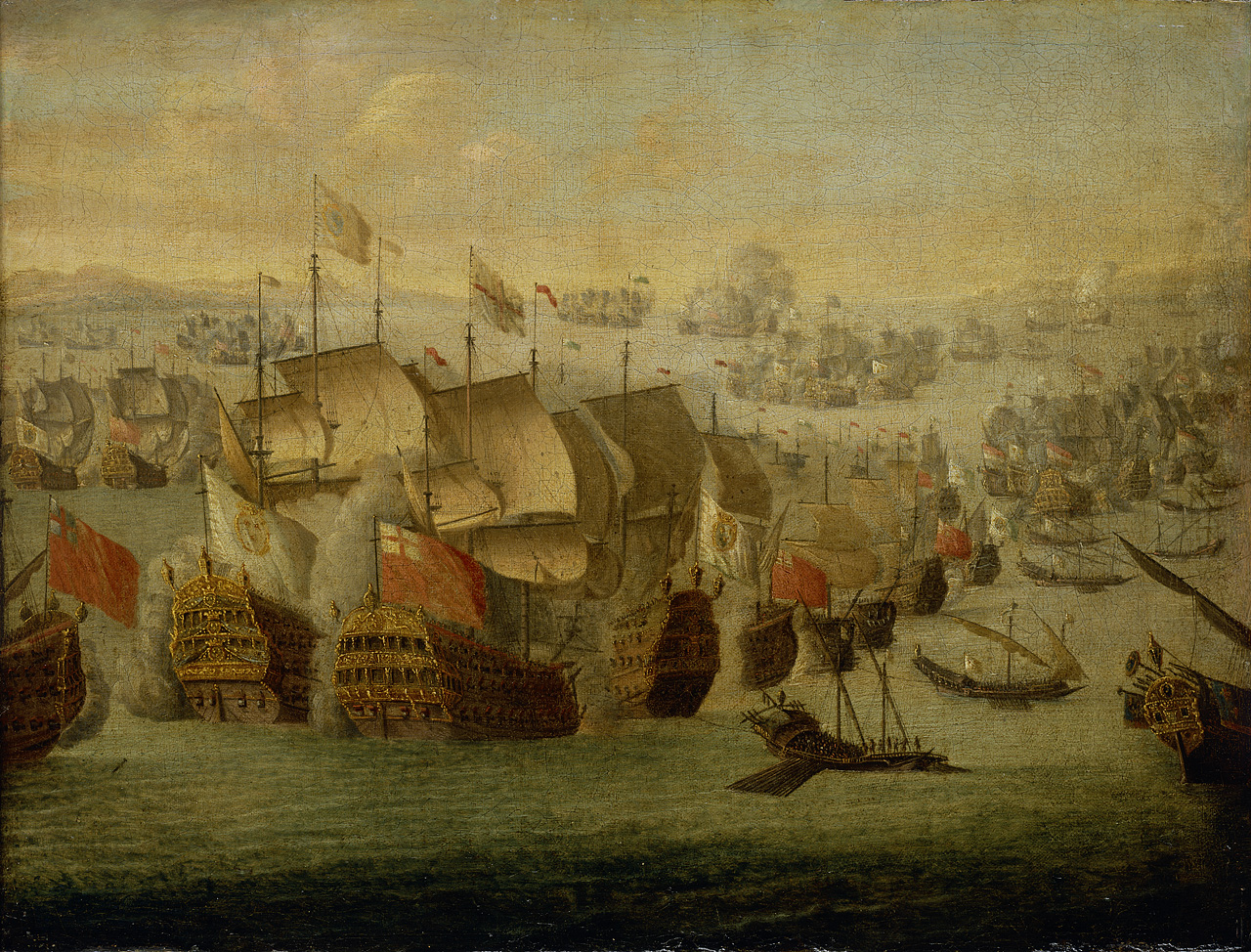
The Battle of Malaga, 13 August 1704 (c. 1704), National Maritime Museum

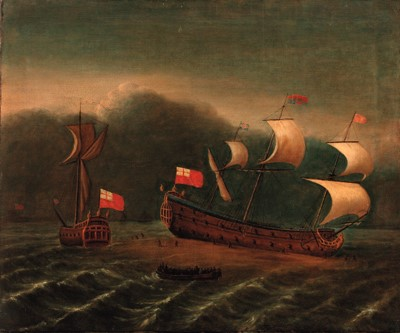
HMS Gloucester aground on the Lemon and Ower Sandbank, off Great Yarmouth, with H.R.H. James, Duke of York aboard, 6th May 1682 (undated)

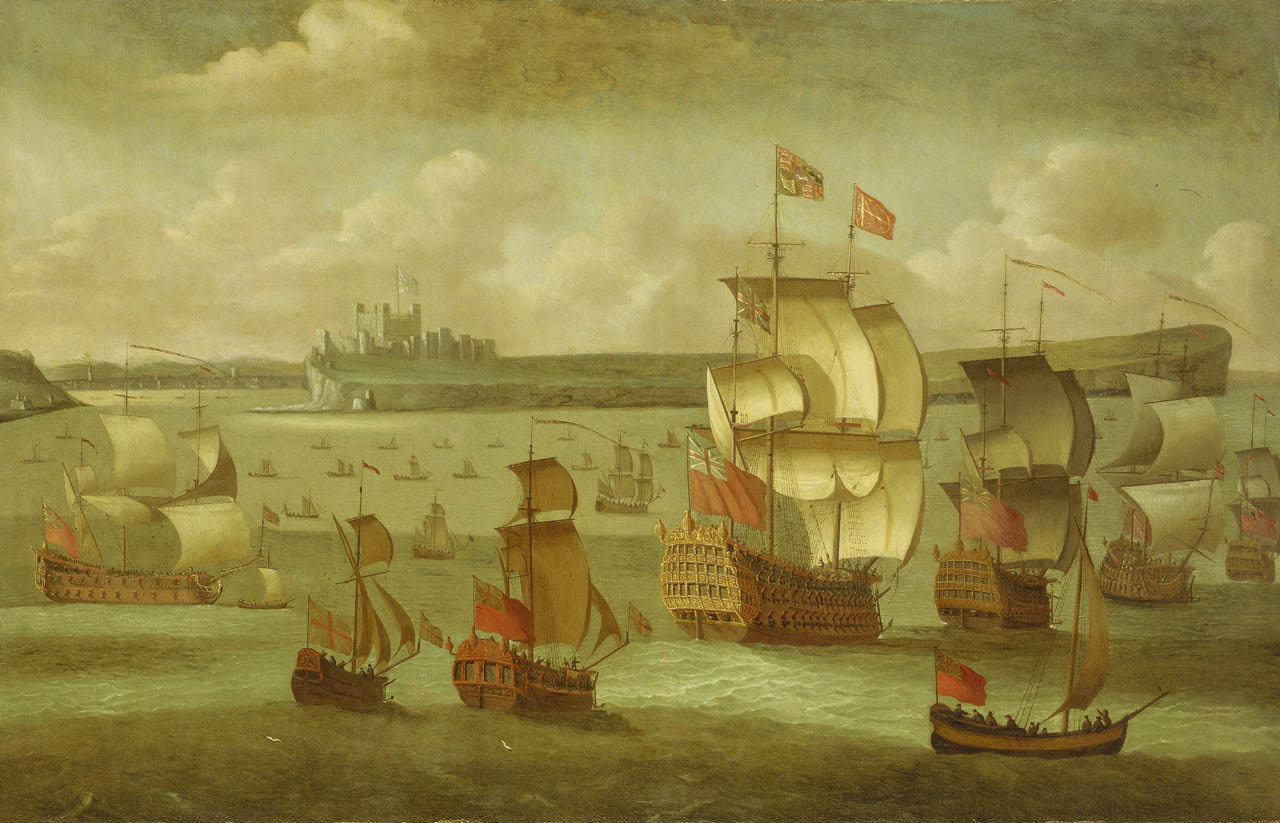
A Ship Flying the Royal Standard with other Vessels off Dover (c. 1707), Royal Museums Greenwich

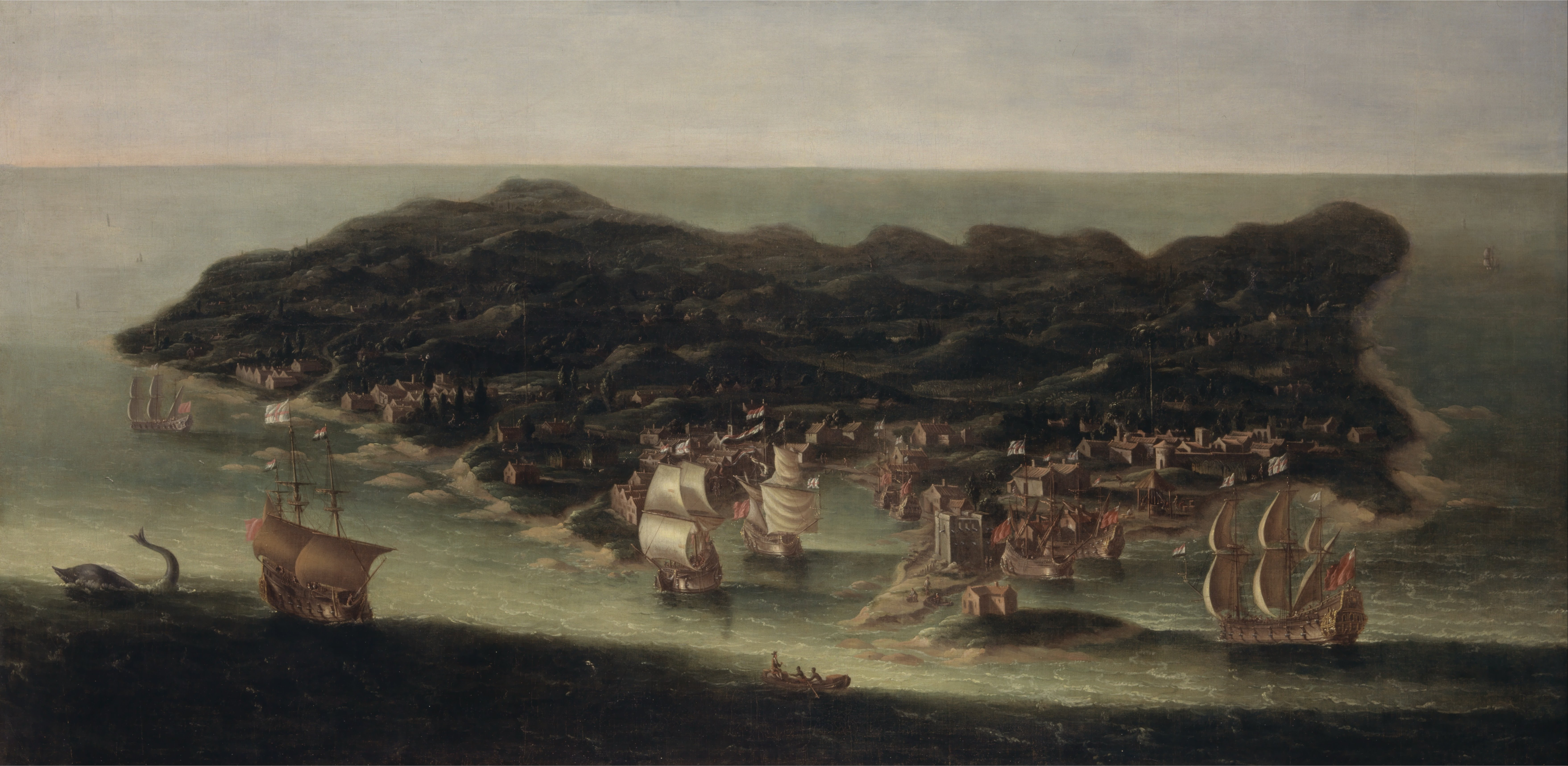
The Island of Barbados (undated), Yale Center for British Art

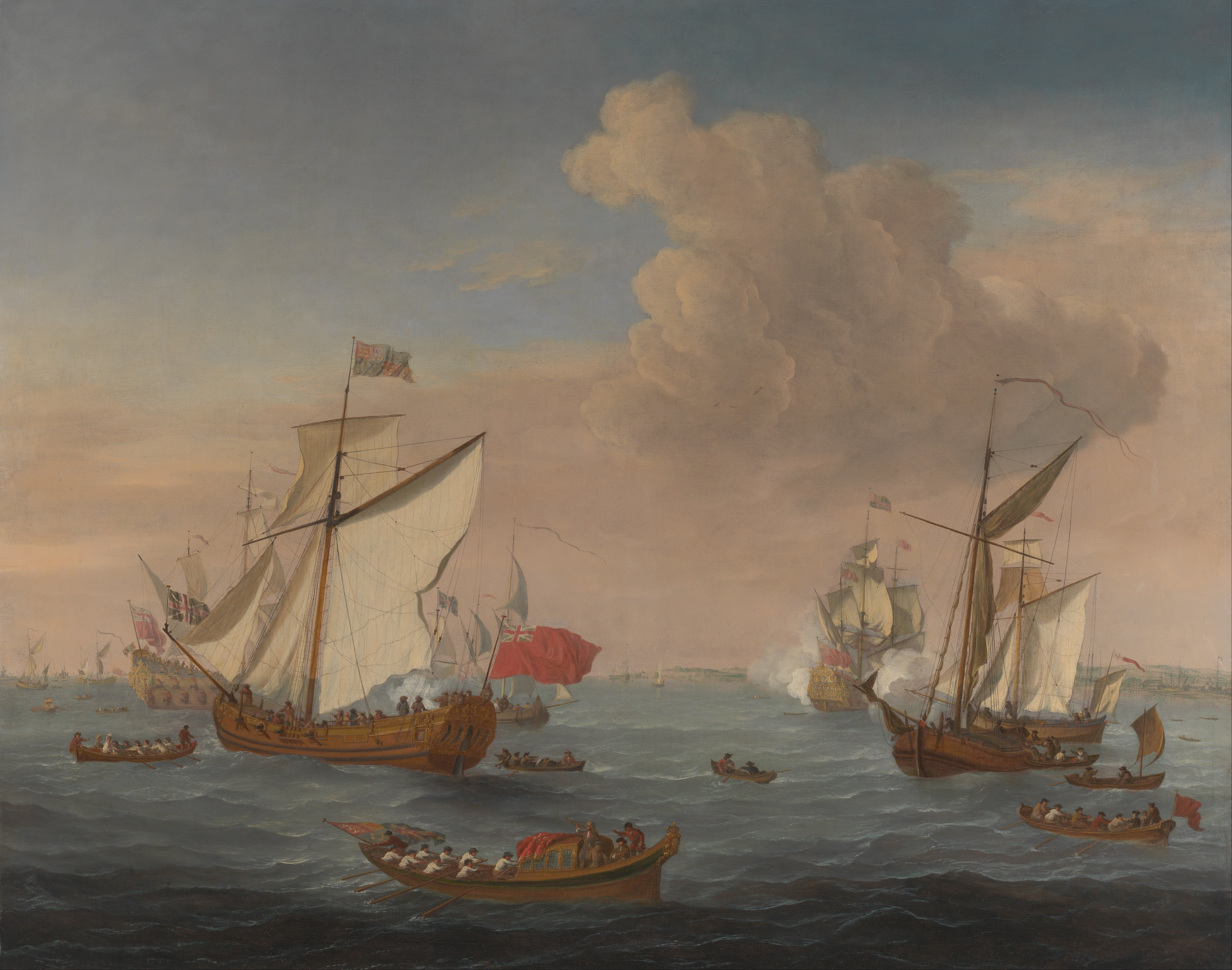
Ships in the Thames Estuary near Sheerness (1707/8), Yale Center for British Art

== Sources ==
- Amussen, Susan Dwyer; Kishlansky, Mark A, eds. (1995). Political Culture and Cultural Politics in Early Modern England Essays Presented to David Underdown. Manchester: Manchester University Press. ISBN 978-07190-4-695-7.
- Archibald, E.H.H. (1982). "The Willem Van De Veldes, their background and influence on maritime painting in England". Journal of the Royal Society of Arts. 130 (5310): 347–360. ISSN 0035-9114. JSTOR 41373391.
- Archibald, E.H.H. (1989). Dictionary of Sea Painters. Antique Collectors' Club. ISBN 978-1-85149-047-9.
- Arber, Edward, ed. (1965). The Term Catalogues, 1668–1709 A. D.; with a number for Easter term, 1711 A.D.A contemporary bibliography of English literature in the reigns of Charles II, James II, William and Mary, and Anne. Vol. 2. New York: Johnson. OCLC 1465503.
- Chatterton, Edward Keble (1928). Old Sea Paintings; the Story of Maritime Art as Depicted by the Great Masters. London: Lane. OCLC 1153303794.
- Cockett, F.B. (1995). Early Sea Painters 1660–1730: the Group who Worked in England Under the Shadow of the Van de Veldes. Antique Collectors' Club. ISBN 978-1-85149-230-5.
- Cockett, Frank B. (2000). Peter Monamy, 1681–1749, and his Circle. Woodbridge, UK: Antique Collectors' Club. ISBN 978-18514-9-339-5.
- Cordingly, D. (1972). Marine Painting in England, 1700–1900. C.N. Potter. ISBN 978-0-517-51229-6.
- Cordingly, D. (1979). Painters of the Sea: A Survey of Dutch and English Marine Paintings from British Collections. Brighton, UK: Lund Humphries for the Royal Pavillion, Art Gallery and Museums. ISBN 978-0-85331-425-7.
- Cordingly, D. (1997). Ships and Seascapes: Introduction to Maritime Prints, Drawings and Watercolours. Bloomsbury. ISBN 978-0-85667-484-6.
- Hemming, Charles (1988). British Painters of the Coast and Sea: a History and Gazetteer. London: V. Gollancz. ISBN 978-0-575-03956-8.
- Walpole, Horace (1828). Anecdotes Of Painting In England with some account of the principal artists. Vol. 1. London: G. Bohn. OCLC 867957155.
- Waterhouse, E.K.; Kitson, M. (1994). Painting in Britain, 1530 to 1790. The Yale University Press Pelican History of Art Series. Yale University Press. ISBN 978-0-300-05833-8.
