= Willem van de Velde the Elder =

Dutch painter

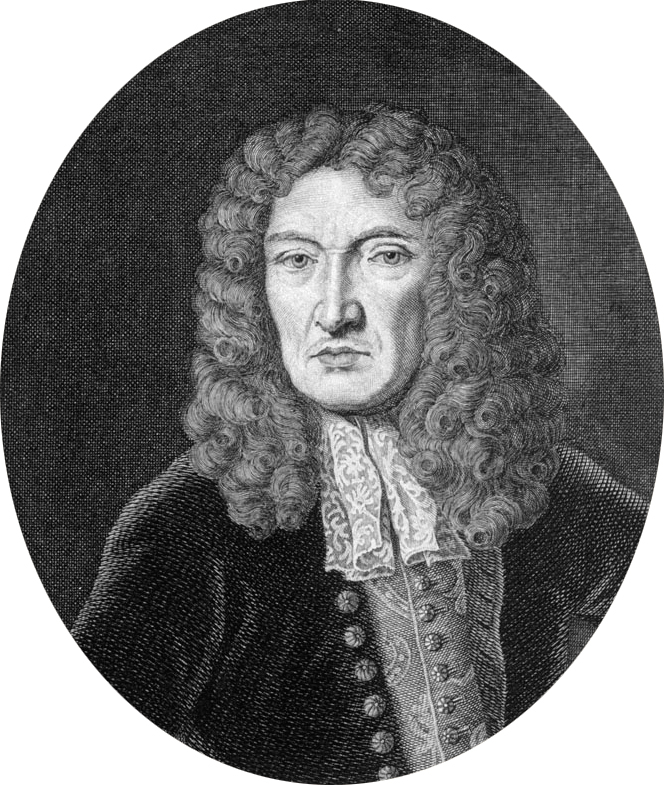
- Willem Gerard van de Velde the Elder (Gerard Sibelius, after Godfrey Kneller)
- Born: Willem van de Velde; 1610/11; Leiden, Holland, Dutch Republic
- Died: 13 December 1693; Sackville Street, London, England.
- Known for: Marine painting

Willem van de Velde the Elder (1610/11 – 13 December 1693) was a Dutch Golden Age seascape painter, who produced many precise drawings of ships and ink paintings of fleets, but later learned to use oil paints like his son.

== Biography ==
Willem van de Velde, known as the Elder, a marine draughtsman and painter, was born in Leiden, the son of a Flemish skipper, Willem Willemsz. van de Velde, and is commonly said to have been bred to the sea. He married Judith Adriaens van Leeuwen in Leiden in 1631.

His three known legitimate children were named Magdalena, born 1632; Willem, known as the Younger, also a marine painter, born 1633 in Leiden; and Adriaen, a landscape painter, baptized in 1636 in Amsterdam. Meanwhile, the family lived Korte Koningstraat, close to the harbour, an area known as the Lastage.

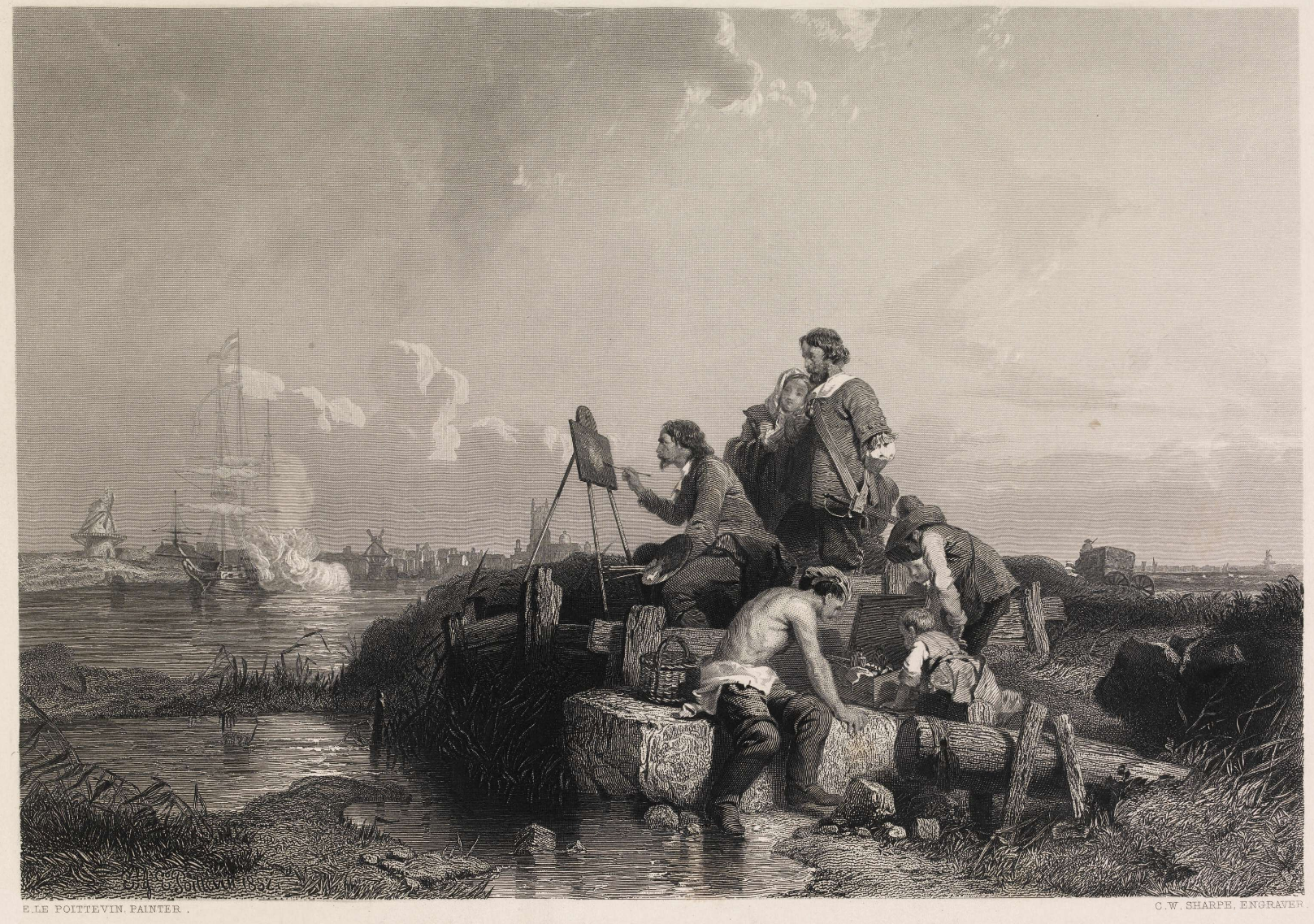
Eugène Lepoittevin, Van de Velde studying the effect of the cannon his friend Ruyter fired for this purpose, 1845, engraving c. 1854 by C.W. Sharp.

His marriage was stormy, at least in its later years. David Cordingly relates that Willem the Elder fathered two children out of wedlock in 1653, one “by his maidservant, and the other by her friend. Nine years later the Elder and his wife went through a legal separation, ‘on account of legal disputes and the most violent quarrels’. The immediate cause of the dispute was his affair with a married woman.” Michael S. Robinson noted that “on 17/27 July 1662, he and his wife agreed to part. A condition of the separation was that the Elder could recover from his son Adriaen ‘two royal gifts’, presumably gifts from Charles II for work done in England.” Cordingly’s account further relates that the dispute was still continuing after another ten years, since “in the autumn of 1672 Judith complained to the woman’s husband.” Robinson adds that by 1674 the couple “must have been reconciled”, for at a chance meeting with Pieter Blaeu in Amsterdam in July the Elder explained that he was only visiting for a few days “in order to fetch his wife”. His son, Adriaen, had died in Amsterdam early 1672, and Willem the Elder was also fetching his grandson, similarly named Adriaen, who was then aged two.

After his move to England, the exact date of which is uncertain, but reportedly at the end of 1672 or beginning of 1673, he is said to have lived with his family in East Lane, Greenwich, and to have used the Queen's House, now part of the National Maritime Museum in Greenwich, as a studio. Following the accession of William III and Mary II as King and Queen of England, it appears that this facility was no longer provided, and by 1691 he was living in Sackville Street, now close to Piccadilly Circus. He died in London, and was buried in St James's Church, Piccadilly, at the south end of the street. A memorial to him and his son lies with in the church.

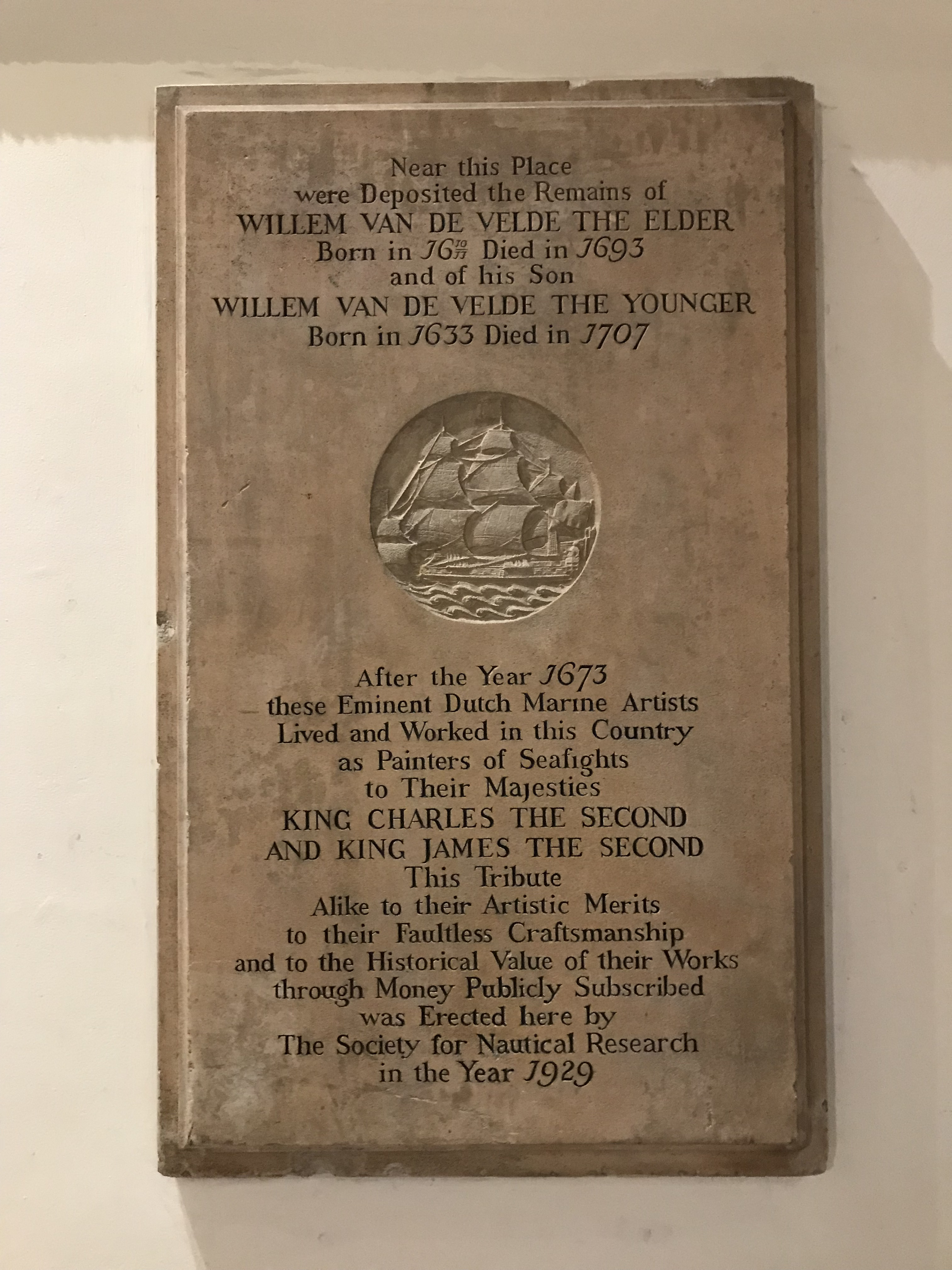
A memorial to Willem van de Velde the Older and the Younger in St James's Church, Piccadilly.

== Professional career ==
He was the official artist of the Dutch fleet for a period, being present at the Four Days Battle, 1–4 June 1666, and the St James's Day Battle, 25 July 1666, to make sketches. In his work on the biographies of artists, Arnold Houbraken quotes Gerard Brandt's biography of Admiral Michiel de Ruyter, relating the anecdote where Willem van de Velde asked Admiral de Ruyter permission to have a galley row him around for a good view of the proceedings on the evening of the Four Days battle in 1666. He wasn't the only artist to paint the scenes of this battle, his son, Ludolf Bakhuysen and Pieter Cornelisz van Soest also made paintings of it. This act later was the reason that van Velde gained his marine commission in London. The date, 1672, commonly given for his entry into the service of Charles II of England, was at a time when the Dutch Republic was at war with England (Third Anglo-Dutch War).

According to the inventory Bartholomeus van der Helst owned or stored many paintings by Van de Velde. They lived close to each other (near Nieuwmarkt) and must have been friends.

== Bibliography ==
- Cordingly, David, The Art of the van de Veldes, introductory chapter, 1982
- Piles, R. de & Buckeridge, B. The Art of Painting; & An Essay towards an English School, 3rd ed; 1754
- Robinson, M.S., Van de Velde Drawings; 2 vols, 1958 and 1973
- Robinson, M.S., The Paintings of the Willem van de Veldes; 2 vols, 1990

== Gallery ==
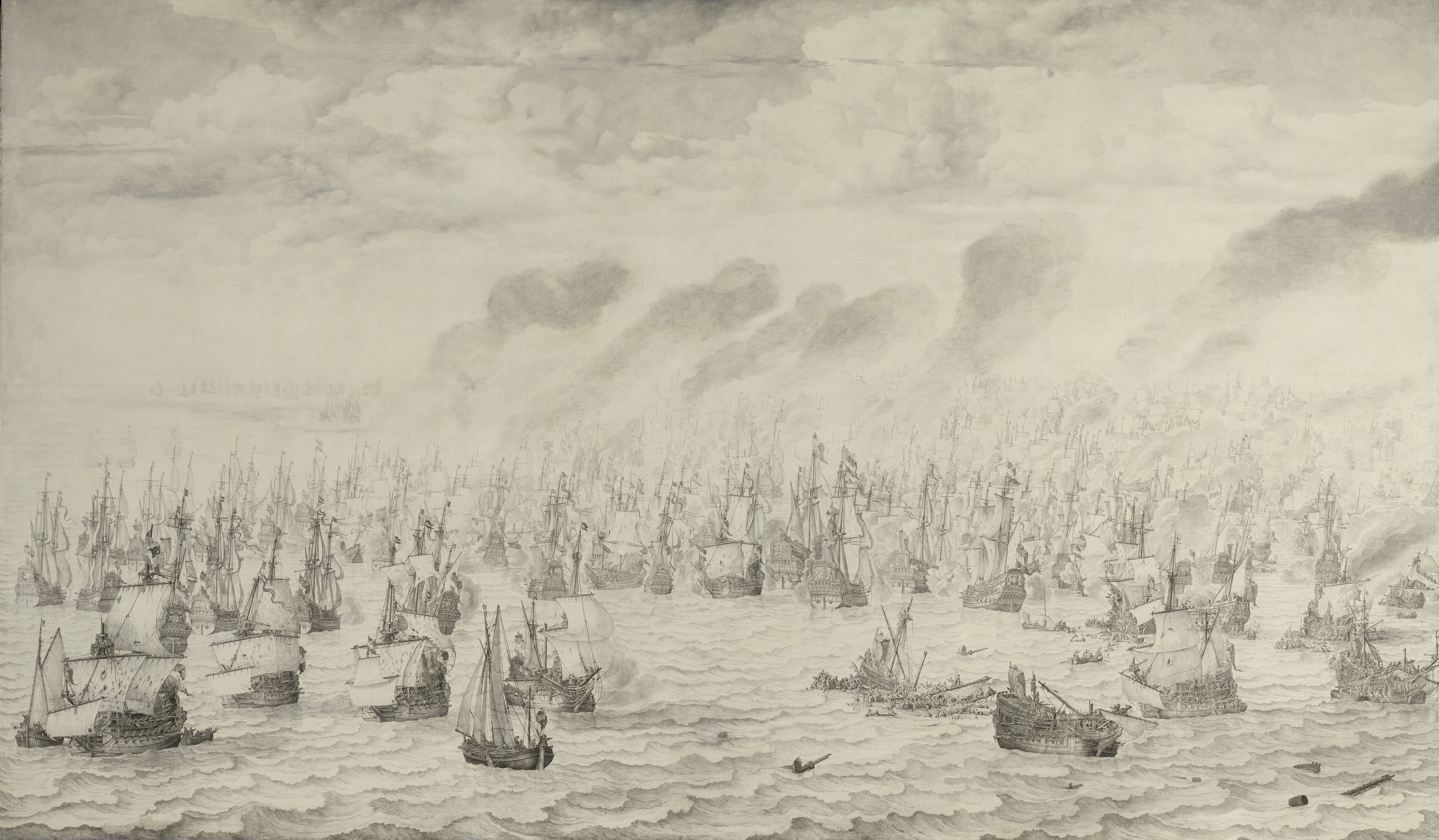
The Battle of Terheide (1657), commemorating the Battle of Scheveningen on 10 August 1653

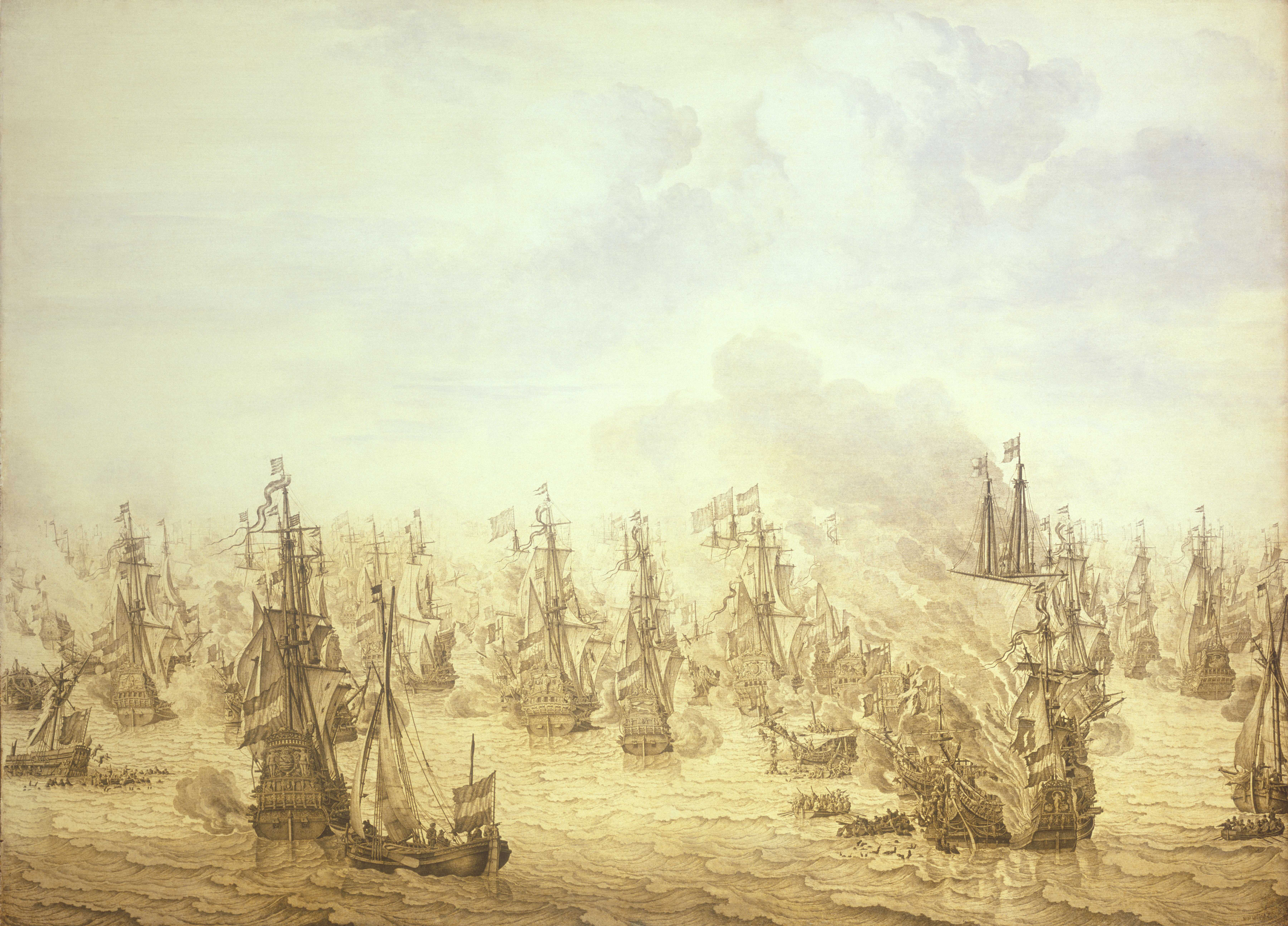
The Battle of Scheveningen, 10 August 1653. Willem painted himself into the scene on a galliot, left foreground, he is the seated figure, drawing the action on his right

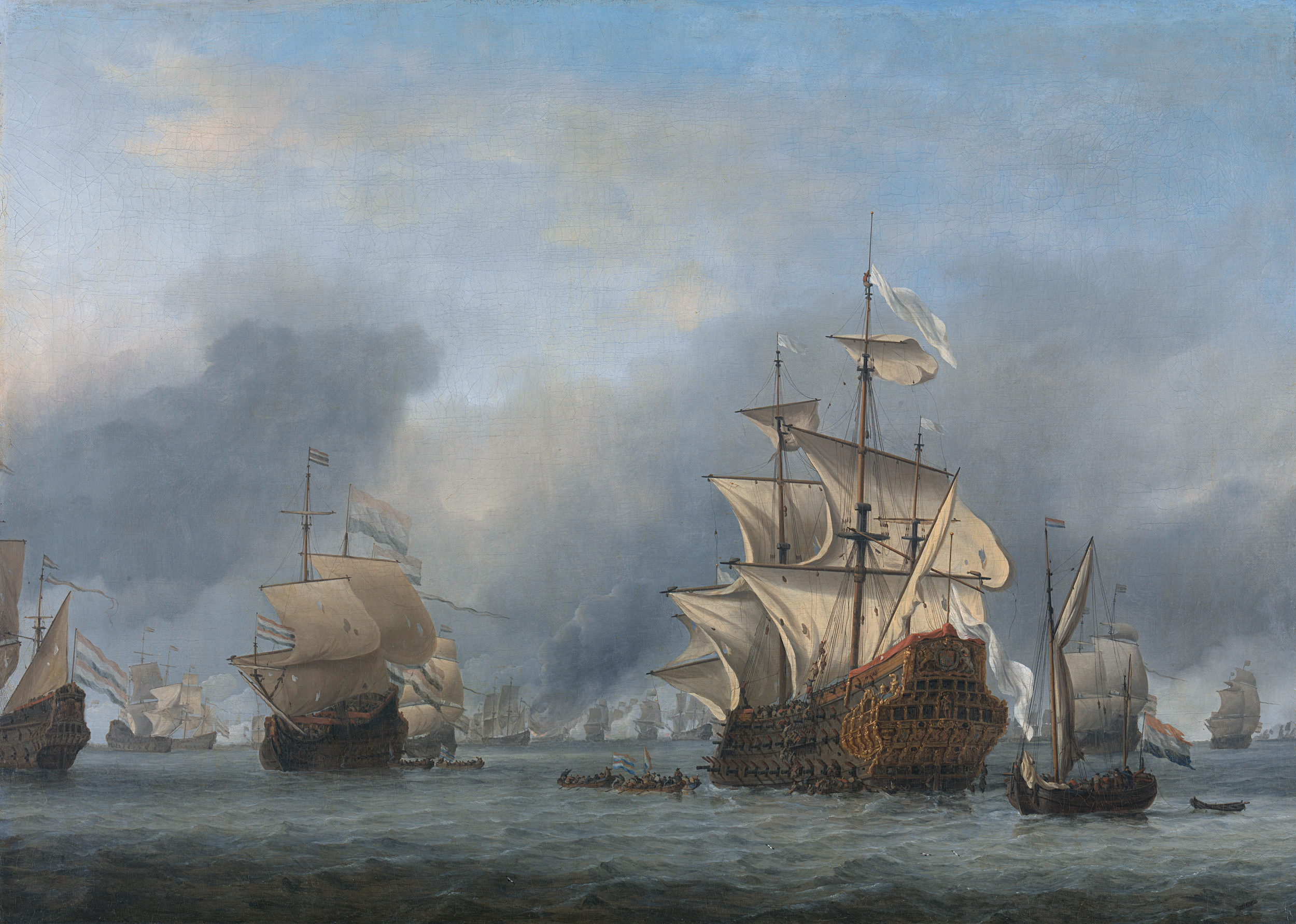
The surrender of the Prince Royal 3 June 1666

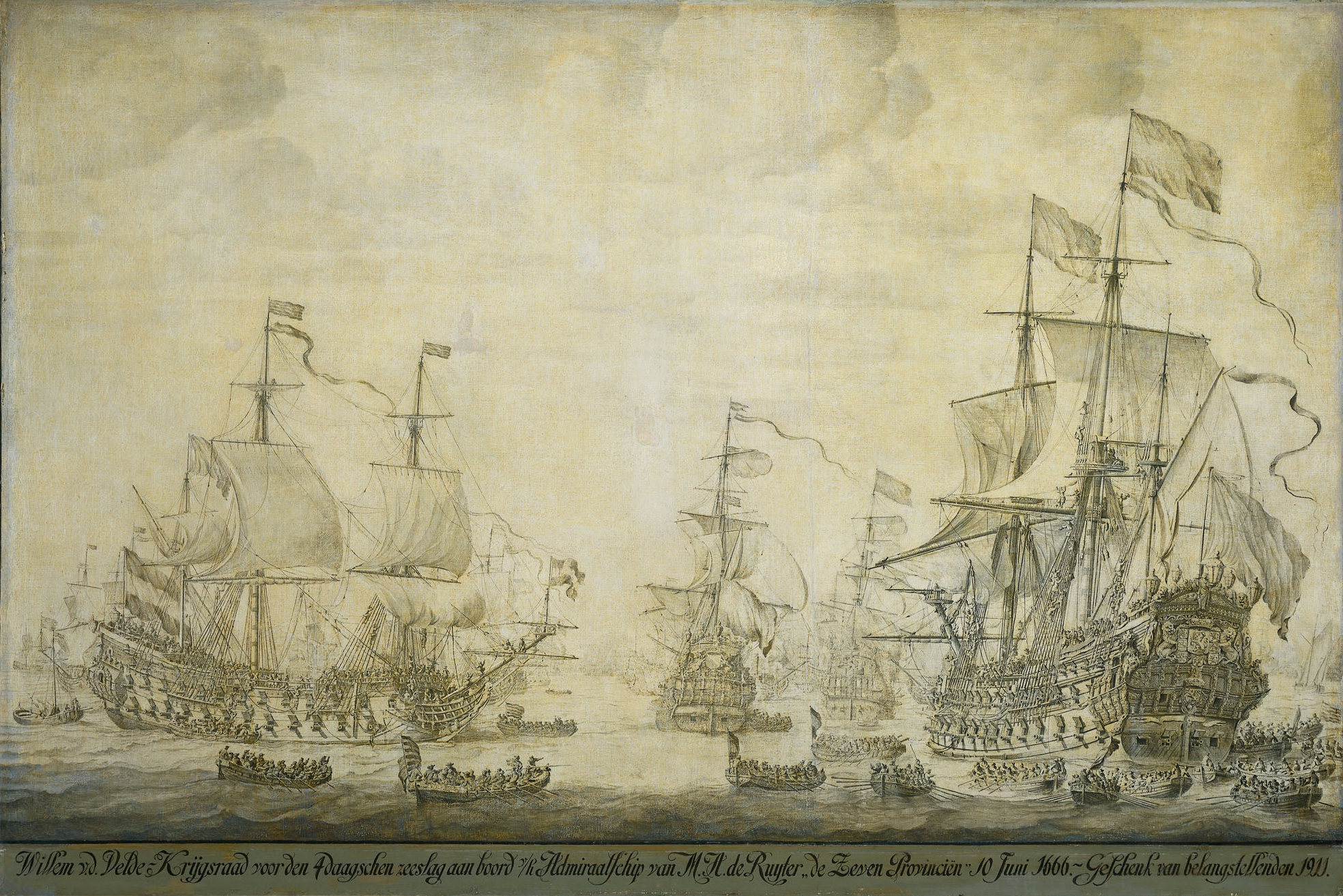
Battle council on the De Zeven Provinciën, 10 June 1666

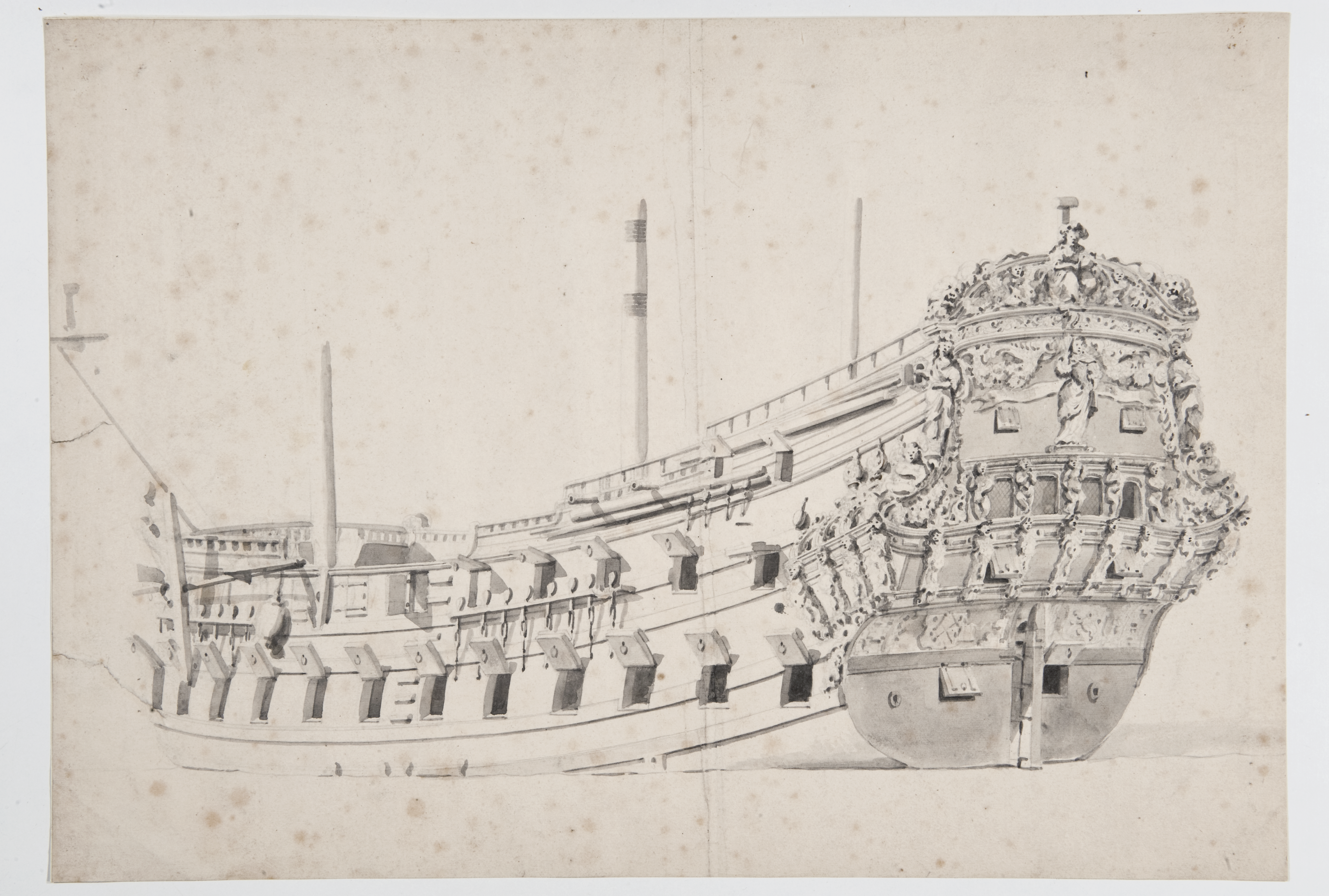
Gallery and transom, 1667, from Sweden's Maritime Museum

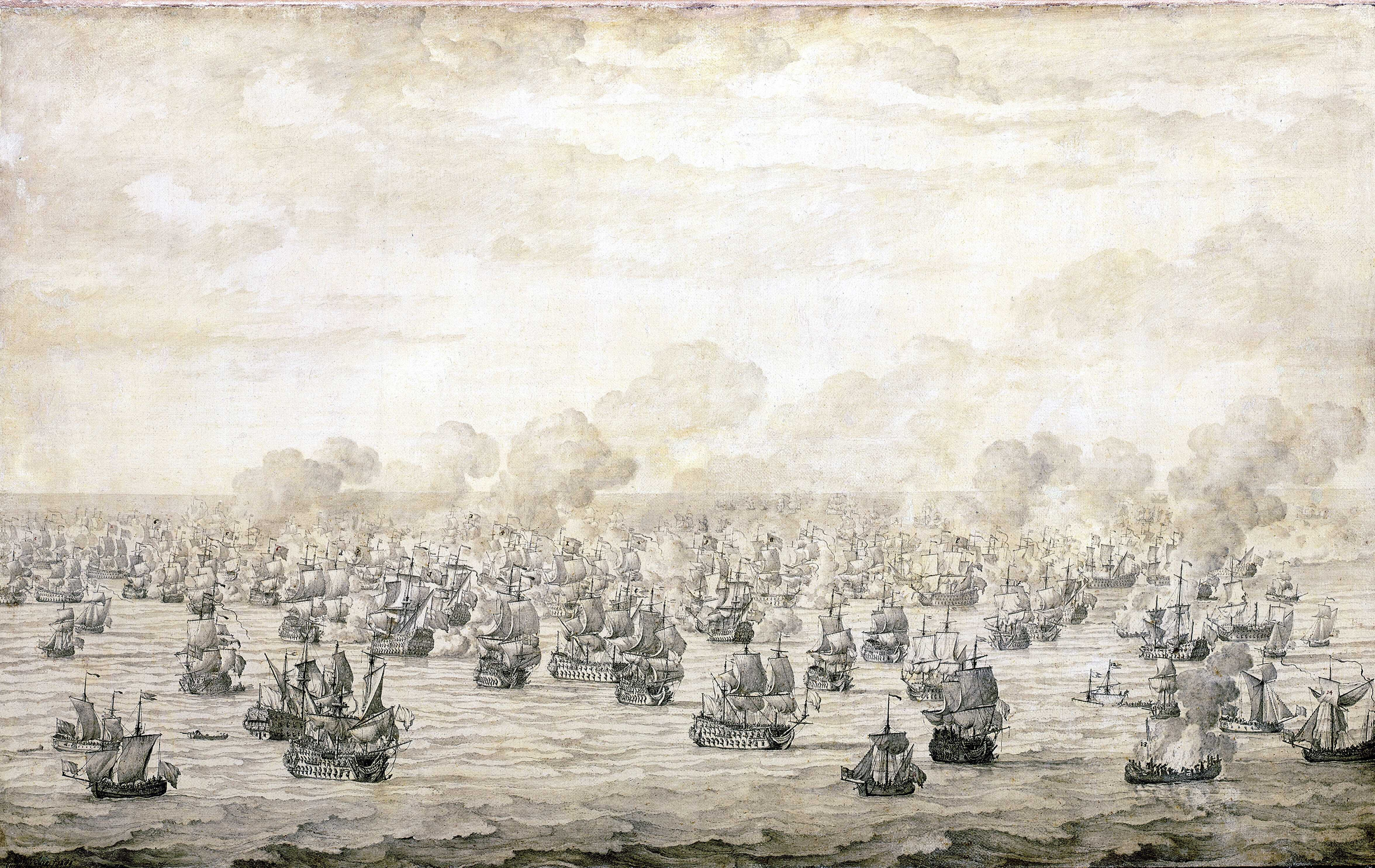
The Battle of Schooneveld (1674), commemorating the Battle of Schooneveld on 7 June 1673
