= Admiralty of the Noorderkwartier =

One of the five admiralties of the Dutch Republic

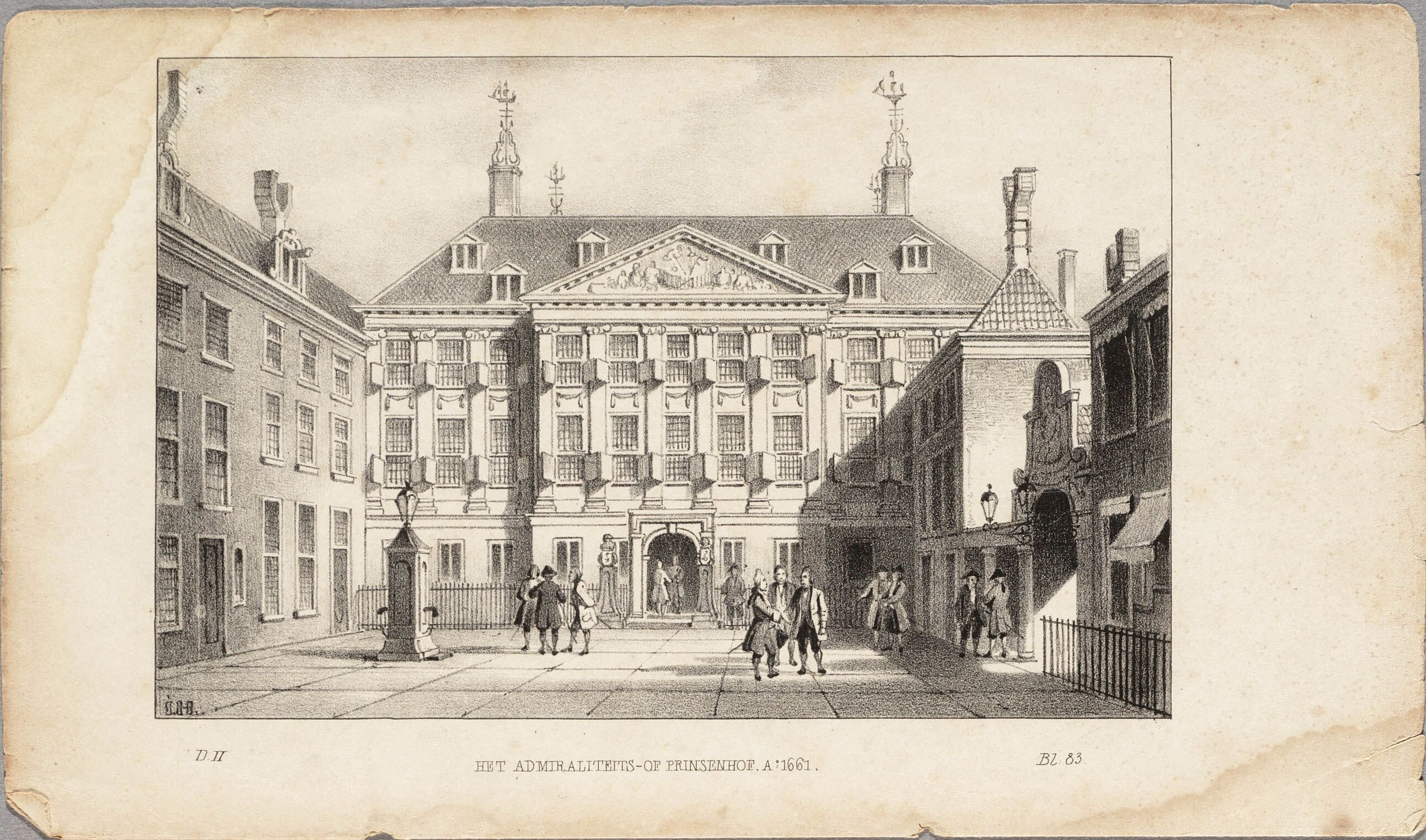
The admiraliteitskantoor in the Prinsenhof at Hoorn in 1606 (Westfries Museum)

The Admiralty of the Noorderkwartier (Dutch, 'Northern Quarter'), also known as the Admiralty of West Friesland, was one of the five admiralties of the Dutch Republic, based in West Friesland, a region in the north of the province of Holland.

== History ==
Originally part of the Admiralty of Amsterdam, regional rivalries within the province of Holland led to the creation of a separate Admiralty for the northern quarter of Holland on 6 March 1589 by a resolution of the States General of the Netherlands at the instigation of Stadholder Maurits of Orange. It had its first headquarters at Hoorn, but from 1597 the headquarters alternated every three months between Hoorn and Enkhuizen, the other main port of the region. The province of Holland had a Northern Quarter and a Southern Quarter. The admiralty was disestablished in 1795.

== Flag Officers ==
Known fleet flag officers of the admiralty include:

- Callenburgh, Gerard: viceadmiraal (1689)
- Dorp, Philips van: waarnemend-luitenant-admiraal (1629)
- Florisse, Pieter: schout-bij-nacht (1652); viceadmiraal (1653)
- Ghent, Willem Joseph: luitenant-admiraal (1666)
- Gravé, Hendrik: luitenant-admiraal (1744)
- Heyn, Piet: luitenant-admiraal (1629)
- Hoen, Albert Cornelisz 't:
- Hoen, Govert 't: schout-bij-nacht (1666)
- Meppel, Jan: viceadmiraal (1659)
- Quispel, Egbert Pietersz: vlaggenkapitein Frederick Stachouwer
- Schepers, Willem Bastiaensz: luitenant-admiraal (1673)
- Schram, Volckert: schout-bij-nacht (1664); viceadmiraal (1664)
- Stachouwer, Frederick: schout-bij-nacht (1665)
- Tobias, Thomas: vlaggenkapitein (?)
- Tromp, Cornelis: viceadmiraal (1665)
- Vlugh, David: schout-bij-nacht (1666)
