= Willem Bastiaensz Schepers =

Dutch States Navy officer

Willem Schepers
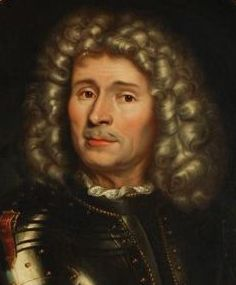
- Born: Willem Bastiaensz Schepers; 8 October 1619; Haarlem, Dutch Republic
- Died: 21 January 1704 (aged 84); Kralingen, Dutch Republic
- Military career
- Allegiance: Dutch Republic
- Admiralties: Admiralty of West Friesland; Admiralty of Amsterdam; Admiralty of Rotterdam
- Years of service: 1673–1704
- Rank: Lieutenant admiral
- Wars: Franco-Dutch War; Third Anglo-Dutch War; 1688 Invasion of England
- Awards: Knight of the Order of the Dannebrog (1677)

Willem Bastiaensz Schepers (8 October 1619 – 21 January 1704) was a Dutch States Navy officer. Having made his career as a shipping magnate in Rotterdam, Schepers was rewarded in 1673 for his political support to the new Orangist regime, by being made lieutenant admiral. In 1688, he organised the transport fleet for the Glorious Revolution.

== Biography ==
Schepers was the son of a sailmaker in Haarlem. On 28 May 1641, he is recorded in Rotterdam as a merchant marrying Bartha de Jong, the daughter of an owner of herring busses in Delfshaven. For the year 1659, Schepers was for the first time in Rotterdam appointed as treasurer of the "Great Fishery", or herring fleet, an office he would hold in several subsequent years. Schepers accumulated much wealth as a ship owner and gained political influence. During this period, in the Dutch Republic political power was contested between the ruling States faction and the Organgists who wanted to make William III of Orange stadtholder.

In the disaster year of 1672, Louis XIV invaded the Republic. The crisis situation was exploited by William III to force the States of Holland to appoint him stadtholder. Schepers with several other Orangists, on 25 Augustus 1672, took over the city council of Rotterdam. He would remain councillor until 1698. As such he had become a member of the Dutch ruling class, the regents. Between 1678 and 1696, he was repeatedly appointed burgomaster and held many other functions, as was usual among the regents.

The new Orangist regime attempted to purify all offices from opponents. In the Dutch navy, this was a slow process, as its officers were very popular naval heroes, whose expertise was sorely needed in the fight against France. After the Battle of Texel in 1673, Schepers was appointed lieutenant-admiral of the Admiralty of the Noorderkwartier on 6 October, succeeding the deceased Jan Meppel, despite never having served in the navy before.

At the time, this was seen as a predominantly political appointment, rewarding Schepers for taking the initiative to order the Rotterdam delegate in the States of Holland to propose the revocation of the Perpetual Edict, forbidding the appointment of any member of the House of Orange in the office of stadtholder. However, Schepers was not merely an Orangist figurehead. He actually sailed on the fleet the next year, until December 1674.

In 1676, he first commanded, with Vice-Admiral Jan Jansse van Nes, a flotilla blocking the French corsair base Dunkirk and then supported the Danes against Sweden with a squadron. In 1677 he fought the Swedish forces in the Baltic and was knighted by Christian V of Denmark in the Order of the Dannebrog. When Cornelis Tromp became lieutenant-admiral-general of the confederate Dutch fleet, Schepers, on 25 February 1678, succeeded him as lieutenant-admiral of the important Admiralty of Amsterdam.

In 1683, Schepers commanded a squadron observing French and Danish naval actions on the North Sea. Returning to the Texel on 11 November, the squadron was hit by a storm that sank eight vessels. The States General of the Netherlands appointed Schepers to head a commission, together with Cornelis Valckenier and Simon Velius, to formulate proposals for the improvement of the readiness of the Dutch fleet. Their recommendations would lay the foundation for the expansion of the Dutch fleet during the 1690s, reaching its largest size during the age of sail.

In 1688, William III called upon Schepers to organise the transport and landing vessels of the invasion fleet in the Glorious Revolution. Schepers personally contributed twelve vessels and hired 93 more. At first it was considered to let Schepers command a squadron, but eventually it was decided that he should accompany William III on Den Briel, a frigate of 30 cannon under flag Captain Joan van der Esch, together with Vice-Admiral Fredrik Willem van Bronckhorst Stirum. On 28 March 1692, Schepers succeeded Lieutenant-Admiral Aert Jansse van Nes at the Admiralty of the Maze. In 1696, he hired fifteen ships to blockade Dunkirk, to prevent a return of James II of England.

Schepers died on 21 January 1704, and was buried with great pomp four days later, in the chapel of the Lords of Kralingen in the Sint-Laurenskerk at Rotterdam. The chapel, acquired by the admiral in 1695, would be destroyed during the bombardment of Rotterdam in May 1940.
