= Willem Joseph van Ghent =

Dutch States Navy officer and nobleman

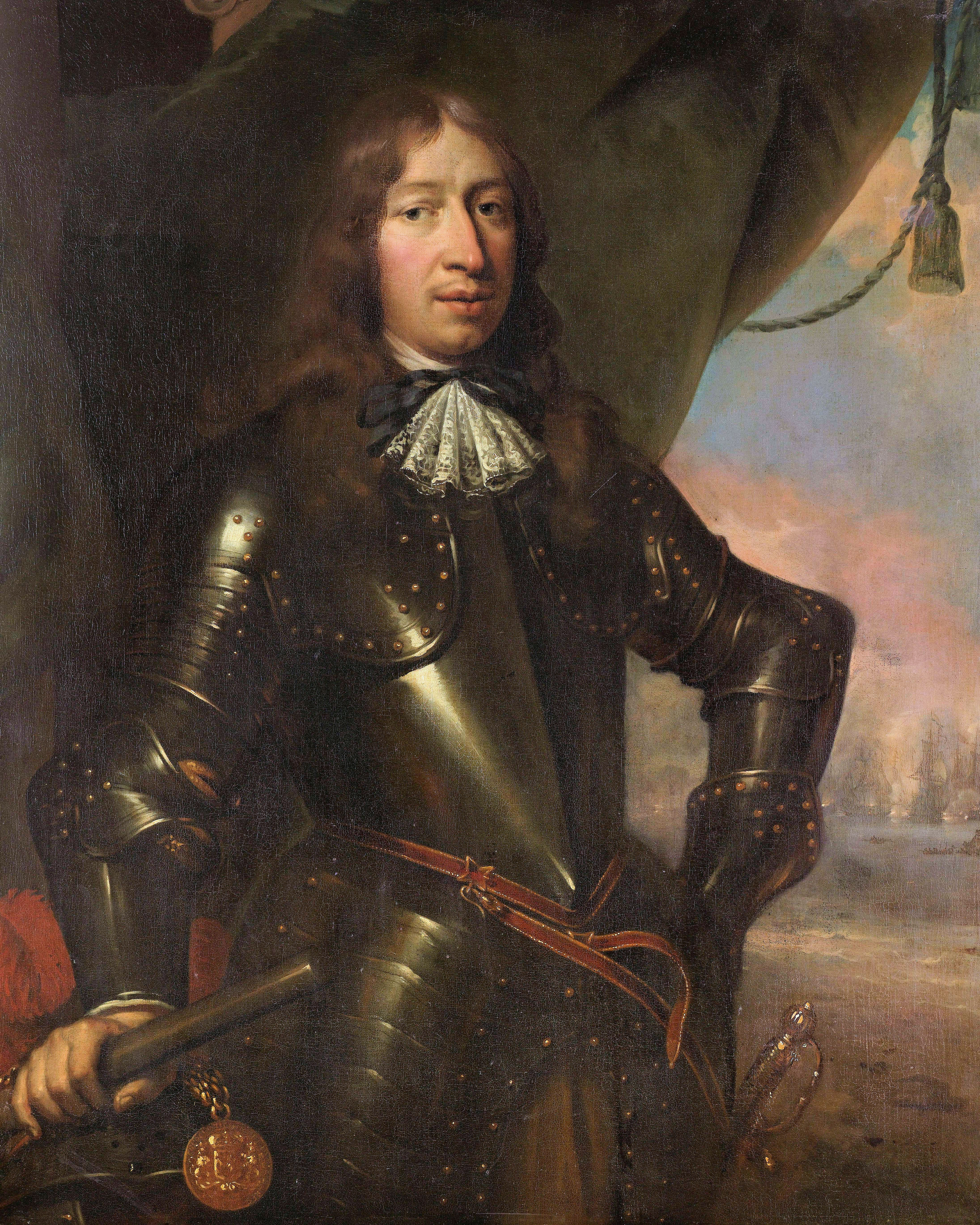
- Van Ghent by Jan de Baen
- Born: 14 May 1626; Winssen, Dutch Republic
- Died: 7 June 1672 (aged 46) off Solebay, England
- Burial place: St. Martin's Cathedral
- Military career
- Allegiance: Dutch Republic
- Branch: Admiralty of the Maze; Admiralty of Amsterdam
- Service years: 1648–1672
- Rank: Admiral
- Commands: Commander of the Dutch Marines
- Wars/battles: Second Anglo-Dutch War; Raid on the Medway; Third Anglo-Dutch War; Battle of Solebay †

Willem Joseph van Ghent (14 May 1626 – 7 June 1672) was a Dutch States Navy officer and nobleman. His surname is also sometimes rendered Gendt or Gent; he was the first commander of the Dutch marines.

== Early career ==
Van Ghent was baptised on 14 May 1626, in the church of Winssen. It is assumed he was born the same day. In 1642, he became provost of Elst, as a sinecure.

Of noble birth, he made a career in the army from 1645 onwards; he started in the regiment of the Count of Hoorne; in 1648, he was promoted to the rank of captain, serving in said regiment. He first became connected to the navy when during the Northern Wars against Sweden in 1659, he executed a landing on the Danish island of Funen under command of Vice-Admiral Michiel de Ruyter.

At that time, Van Gendt was an unsalaried major, commanding a regiment of Walloons. During this campaign, there was a large emphasis on and development of amphibious operations, involving Dutch naval officers like the later Rear-Admiral Frederick Stachouwer and Vice-Admiral Volckert Schram.

== Second Anglo-Dutch War ==
=== Colonel to captain ===
On 6 March 1663, Van Ghent was appointed a salaried major. On 3 December 1664, he was promoted lieutenant-colonel and was appointed as the military governor of Hellevoetsluis, the major Dutch naval port. This promotion was put forward by the threat of a new war with the English: in March 1665, Charles II of England indeed declared the Second Anglo-Dutch War. In August 1665, Van Ghent was present on De Ruyter's fleet relieving the Dutch treasure fleet at Bergen after the battle of Vågen. The same year, he advised the leading politician of the Dutch Republic, Grand Pensionary Johan de Witt, to found a special marine corps, the Regiment de Marine, which was established on 10 December 1665. This is often seen as a precursor of the Dutch Royal Marine Corps. Van Ghent was to be its first commander, carrying the rank of colonel.

Together, Van Ghent and De Witt conceived the plan to let a victorious sea battle be followed by an immediate landing on the English coast, in order to destroy the enemy fleet at the Chatham Dockyard while it was under repair and at its most vulnerable. For this purpose on transport ships, a large marine contingent would be kept in reserve, to be employed when the opportunity arose.

However, if Van Ghent would in his capacity of commander of the marines and as an army colonel be present on the fleet, this would be too conspicuous, possibly betraying the plan to the English. Therefore, Van Ghent was appointed a naval captain with the Admiralty of the Maze to command the Gelderland. Although it was held in the navy that the rank of captain at sea was indeed equivalent to a colonel, many in the army disagreed and Van Ghent himself was bitterly disappointed to be humiliated by the proud Lieutenant-Admiral Cornelis Tromp in an incident, insisting that he was formally treated in accordance with his nominal rank. For the same reason of covert operation, Van Ghent's deputy, Vice-Commander of the Marines Lieutenant-Colonel François Palm, was also made a naval captain, on the Kruiningen and the Count of Hoorn was appointed Captain of another ship by the name Gelderland.

When the Dutch confederate fleet sailed south to meet the English in the Four Days' Battle, the Gelderland was damaged, even before the fight proper started, by a sudden swell, causing such heavy pitching that the foremast broke. The ship had to be towed to port. To be able to continue commanding the marines, Van Ghent moved to the Utrecht, the covering ship of De Zeven Provinciën, De Ruyter's flagship. Though the English fleet was indeed heavily damaged in the battle and was forced to withdraw, the Dutch fleet was in no condition to press the pursuit, let alone execute a complex landing operation. A major setback was the death of schout-bij-nacht (Rear-Admiral) Stachouwer, who had extensive amphibious operations' experience, during the second day of the battle.

=== Captain to lieutenant-admiral ===
Six weeks later, the Dutch navy set out again, with the fleet numbering ten flutes carrying the Marines. Main objective was to raid the English fleet, which was still lying in the dock with repairs after the battle. Van Ghent was present on his ship, the Gelderland. Inclement weather, however, prevented the amphibious landing and the English fleet sailed out from the river Thames. Rendered ineffective and in a sense superfluous, the transport ships were left behind near the Continental coast of Flanders and the Dutch navy actively sought battle with the English fleet. In the ensuing St. James's Day Battle, the Gelderland served as the covering ship of De Zeven Provinciën and shot off the rigging of the Royal Charles when it attacked the Dutch flagship. Forced to drop anchor as her own sails were in tatters, the Gelderland narrowly was saved from an approaching English fireship by intervention of Jan van Brakel, himself a fireship captain who just happened to pass rowing back with his crew in sloops after having expended his own vessel.

The Dutch, having narrowly averted disaster, for the moment abandoned any thought of an amphibious landing. After the battle De Ruyter accused Cornelis Tromp to have been responsible for the defeat. The latter also came under the suspicion of planning a coup d'état and was cashiered on 24 August. De Witt immediately proposed Van Ghent, seen as politically reliable, as a successor; the very same day he was promoted lieutenant-admiral and appointed commanding admiral in the Admiralty of Amsterdam. Van Ghent, not wanting to take sides in this political dispute, at first refused his appointment asking to be excused for his lack of experience. However, Tromp then wrote him a letter in which he made clear he would not hold any grudges against him and pointing out he would be a fool not to make use of such a rare opportunity. Van Ghent now accepted his appointment to the title (shared with two others) of Lieutenant-Admiral of Holland and West-Frisia, thereby jumping two ranks. The high rank would in future also provide a believable alibi for having Van Ghent present in the fleet, without suggesting any planned landing operations.

After having served as a squadron commander from 5 September till the middle of October 1666, as part of the national fleet trying to prevent a possible blockade of the Dutch trade lanes, Van Ghent was dispatched as a flotilla commander in April 1667 to block a Scottish fleet presumably aiming to intercept the first convoy to set out from the Texel. Van Ghent set out on his flagship Hollandia (with flag captain Thomas Tobias), commanding a force of 24 ships, to cruise the northern North Sea. In fact no naval action followed, although the entire Scottish militia was mobilised to repel a dreaded Dutch landing.

=== Raid on the Medway ===
In May 1667, Van Ghent could finally take part in 'his' amphibious landing, the Raid on the Medway, the success of which was mainly due to his merit. The English fleet was laid up at the docks on the Medway due to financial deficits and was vulnerable to attack. Van Ghent first used the Dolphijn as his flagship, with flag captain Hendrik Vollenhove, having on board deputy to the States of Holland, Cornelis de Witt, for political control. He later moved his flag to the frigate Agatha to attack the docked English ships with a frigate squadron from 21 June 1667. Three English men-of-war were burnt and the Royal Charles was taken as a prize. Van Ghent was rewarded by the States-General of the Netherlands with a golden enamelled chalice, showing the event; sadly this priceless piece would be lost in the 18th century when it was trampled by the then-owner in anger when he was obliged to pay a gold-tax.

Immediately after having delivered the Royal Charles at Goeree, Van Ghent set out on the Dolphijn to Shetland to escort and protect the Return Fleet, a biannual convoy from the East-Indies, on this occasion commanded by Joan van Dam. At that time his vice-admiral was Johan de Liefde and his rear-admiral Hendrik Brunsveld. He only returned to the Texel, with his escortees, after the Treaty of Breda had been signed on 31 July 1667.

== Third Anglo-Dutch War ==
After the second Dutch war Van Ghent was inactive as an admiral for three years. In 1668 he was a member of the Council of State with the States of Utrecht, the government of that province. From May until November 1670 he carried out operations, in cooperation with an English flotilla commanded by Vice-Admiral Sir Thomas Allin, against Algerian corsairs, off the coast of West-Africa. Van Ghent's flotilla consisted of thirteen ships, mostly frigates, from the admiralties of Amsterdam, Rotterdam and Zealand. His vice-admirals were Johan de Liefde and Cornelis Evertsen the Younger.

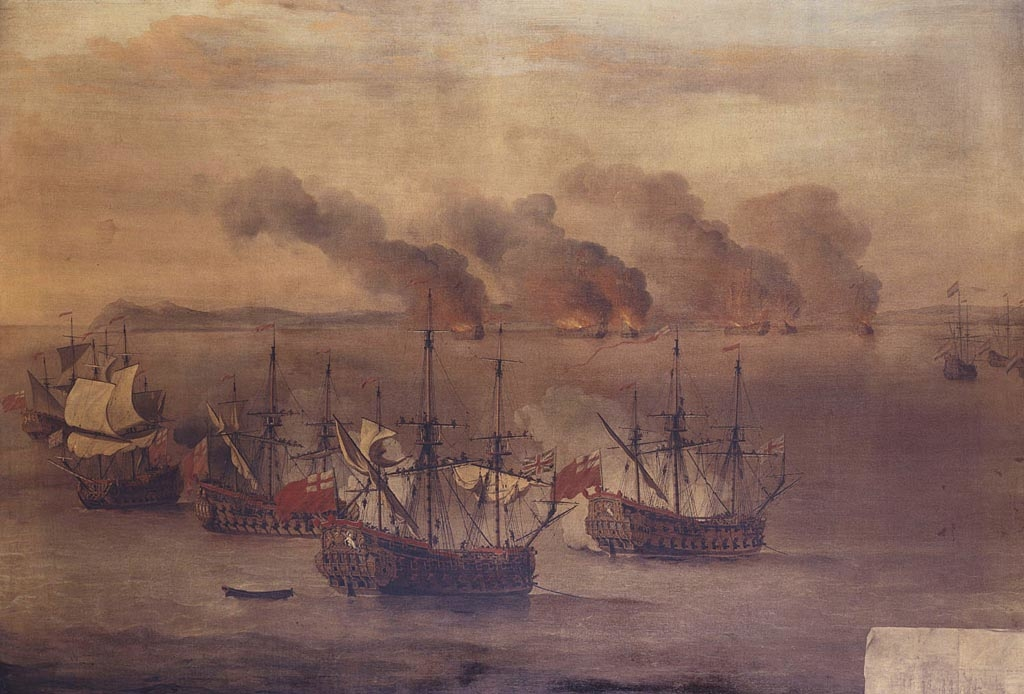
The destruction of six Barbary ships near Cape Spartel on 17 August 1670

On 17 August 1670, van Ghent on his flagship Spiegel, with British Ships under Commodore Richard Beach captured and burnt six Algerine privateers. Two hundred Christian slaves were liberated. As a reward Van Ghent received a golden chain worth eight hundred guilders.

In 1671 war again threatened with England. That summer the Dutch confederate fleet was largely kept busy training in preparation for the conflict. Van Ghent commanded, with the Gouden Leeuw of 90 cannon as his flagship, the third squadron, largely consisting of frigates. His vice-admiral was Isaac Sweers. King Charles II of England that summer tried to create another flag incident to obtain a pretext to declare war. On 24 August the royal yacht Merlin, carrying the wife of the previous English ambassador in the Republic Sir William Temple to London, deliberately sailed through the Dutch fleet being maintained at anchor off Brill.

Both De Zeven Provinciën and the Dolphijn saluted firing white smoke, but the Merlin then halted shooting in anger at the Dolphijn. Van Ghent, a personal acquaintance of Temple, let himself be rowed in a boat to the yacht, to inquire why such a hostile attitude was taken. He received the demand that the capital Dutch ships would strike their flag in salute. Indeed, by the 1662 treaty Dutch warships were obliged to salute first, but only when meeting English men-of-war; Van Ghent answered he was uncertain whether a yacht counted as such and that it was not his place to create a legal precedent. Charles now instructed the new ambassador, Sir George Downing, to demand from the States-General of the Netherlands that Van Ghent would be severely punished for this insolence, but these refused. After a diplomatic row lasting half a year, Charles declared war, explicitly referring to this incident.

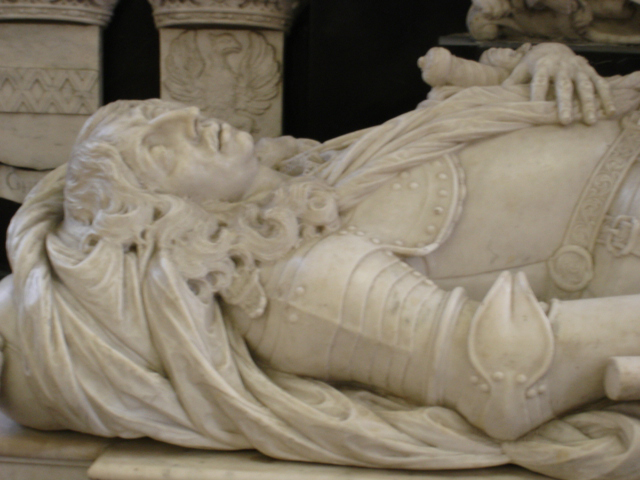
Ghent's tomb effigy in the Domkerk in Utrecht

During the Third Anglo-Dutch War, Van Ghent first made an attempt from 24 to 26 May to repeat his earlier success at Chatham, but it soon became clear that the English coast had been sufficiently reinforced to repel any attacks. He then participated in the first major sea fight of the war, the battle of Solebay. Commanding the Dutch vanguard on the Dolphijn, he attacked the Royal James, flagship of Edward Montagu, 1st Earl of Sandwich commanding the squadron of the blue. Standing on deck Van Ghent was hit by a canister shot that cut off his lower left leg below the knee and penetrated his torso at five places. He tumbled forward, as his flag captain Michiel Kindt put it in his log, "utterly dead".

The Royal James was burnt and Montagu drowned. The corpse of Van Ghent was quickly brought back to the Netherlands on the galliot Walvisch. There it was embalmed because Van Ghent had indicated to his family his desire to be buried in the city of Utrecht but this location was at the time still occupied by French forces. In August 1674 sculptor Rombout Verhulst began work on Van Ghent's grave memorial in the St. Martin's Cathedral, finishing in June 1676. Until that time Van Ghent was temporarily interred at Arnhem; he was reburied at some time before late 1680; the precise date is unknown. The grave memorial is still extant. Van Ghent was deeply mourned in the Republic for having been both a brave and a kind, unpretentious man.
