= The Gun Salute =

c. 1680 oil on canvas painting by Willem van de Velde the Younger

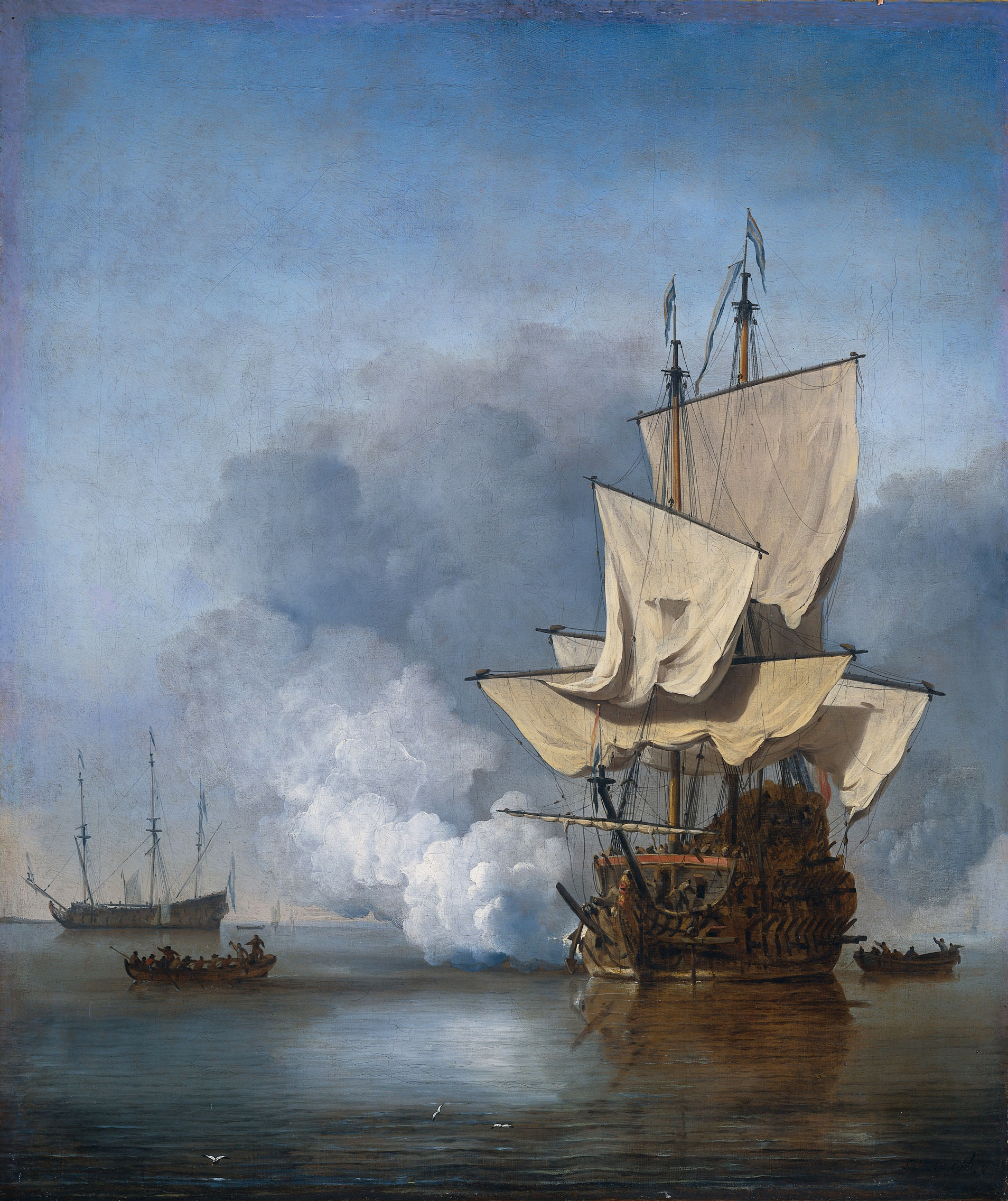
The Gun Salute (c. 1680) by William van de Velde the Younger

The Gun Salute (Dutch - Het kanonschot) is an oil on canvas painting by Willem van de Velde the Younger, created c. 1680, showing a ship of the Dutch navy firing a gun salute. It and its pendant work The Gust of Wind (De windstoot) were painted after his arrival in England around 1672, where he later succeeded his father as court painter to Charles II of England.

The two works remained together for a long while and by the 18th century had joined Sir Philip Stephens's collection. In 1834 the Amsterdam-based banker and collector Adriaan van der Hoop bought The Gun Salute at auction. He believed it portrayed De Zeven Provinciën, flagship of the Dutch naval hero Michiel de Ruyter; de Ruyter had a high opinion of van de Velde and even fired cannon for him to allow him to study the light effects this produced. However, this identification has now been refuted.

In 1845, van der Hoop lent the painting to an old masters' exhibition. In a review of the exhibition art critic Alexander Oltmans gave it its present title. It was initially assigned to the Museum van der Hoop, before being transferred to the Rijksmuseum in 1885. The Gust of Wind is also in the Rijksmuseum collection.
