= Hendrik Gravé =

Dutch States Navy officer

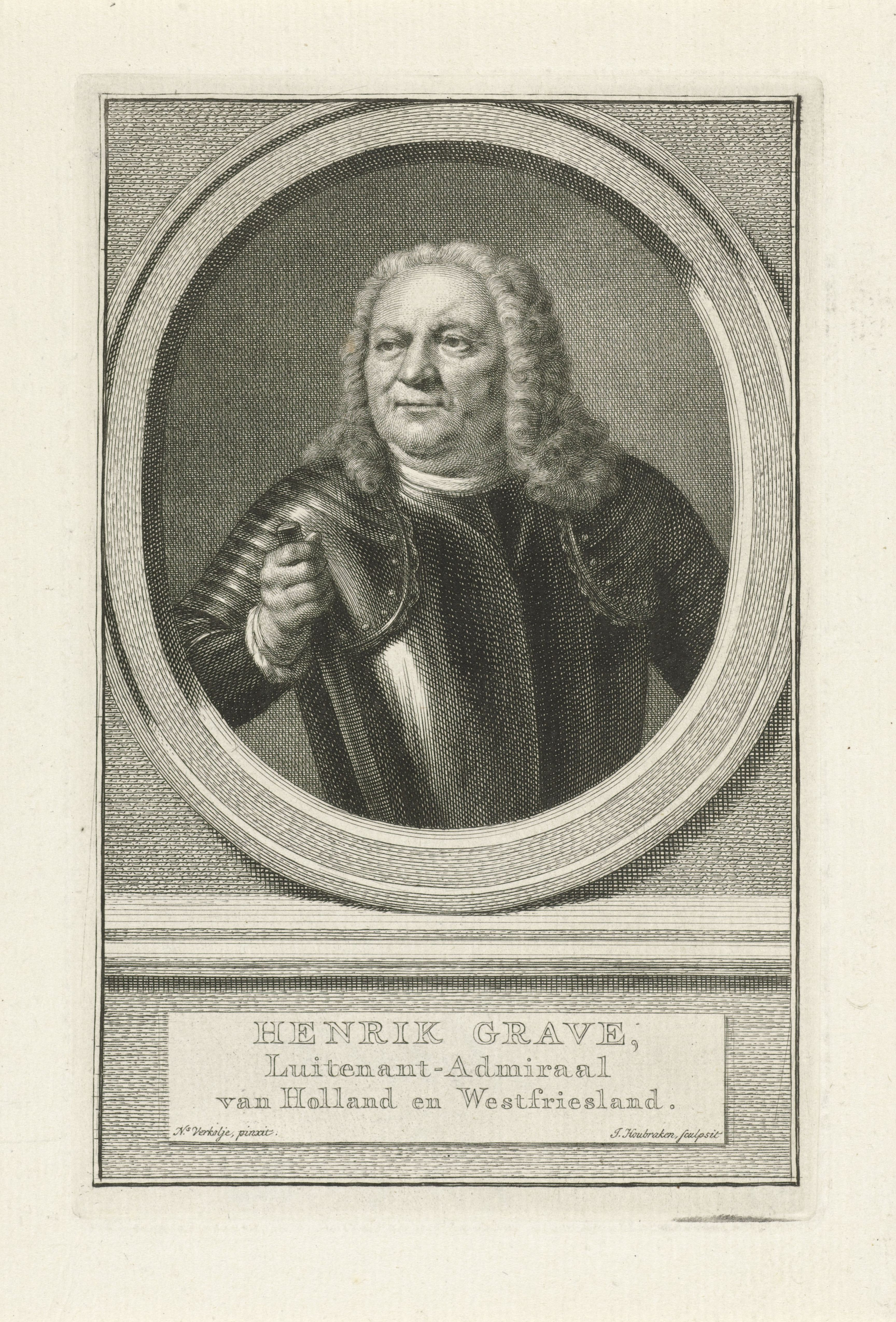
- Engraving of Hendrik Gravé
- Born: 1670; Amsterdam
- Died: 1749 (aged 78–79); Amsterdam
- Military career
- Allegiance: Dutch Republic
- Branch: (Netherlands) Dutch Navy
- Service years: 1688–1749
- Rank: Lieutenant Admiral

Hendrik Gravé (5 December 1670 – 25 March 1749) was a Dutch States Navy officer.

== Life ==
On his eighteenth birthday, Gravé entered the service of the Admiralty of Amsterdam, in 1691 becoming luitenant-ter-zee. In 1698, he became buitengewoon kapitein (captain-extraordinary). He married Lucia van Mollem in 1704 in the Waldensian church in Utrecht, and they had one son, Hendrik (1709–1738), and one daughter, Jacoba.

In 1713, Hendrik became a full captain. In 1716, Gravé led a convoy to the Baltic Sea and in 1717 became commandeur with the Admiralty. In 1718 he became the owner of the fine Nieuwe Herengracht 99, well known for art connoisseurs due to the five gigantic hunting still lifes by Jan Weenix. By 1721 Hendrik Gravé had moved to Kloveniersburgwal 95. In 1722, Hendrik Gravé became schout-bij-nacht and was the following year put in command of a Dutch expedition against the Algerian pirates.

Due to a problem with his foot (called podagra, possibly meaning gout), Gravé had himself tied onto his chair when there were storms. Gravé ...

delighted in the company of everybody, even of English colleagues, in wide-ranging talks and fencing language, sat gaming for days in succession in coffee houses in Portsmouth, afterwards falling into post-prandial sleep by the hearth. To the Lords of the Admiralty in London he wrote high-flown letters, laden with Latin quotations. Gravé once entertained them with an exposition in Latin on the origin of his family with the North Brabantish Gravés.

In 1742, he possessed four servants, a carriage, two horses, and an income of 7,000 guilders a year. On 8 May 1744, at 73, he was made lieutenant-admiral of the Admiralty of the Noorderkwartier, jumping a rank as he never had been a vice admiral. Other officers protested at his appointment. After years of illness, he died at 78 and his funeral, as described by Braatbard, was an event of the first order, with the procession lasting three and a half hours.
