= Thomas Tobias =

Thomas Tobias (c. 1630 – 1681) was an Irish naval officer who served in both the English Royal Navy and the Dutch States Navy before and during the Second and Third Anglo-Dutch Wars.

Tobias is first mentioned as being an officer under Admiral Edward Spragge in the West Indies.

Tobias is later mentioned prominently during the Four Days' Battle of 1666 as leading the action against the 60-gun English "greatship" Swiftsure, taking her as a prize and given subsequent command of her and the prize crew responsible for repairing her and conveying her back to Amsterdam where she was upgraded to 70 guns and renamed the Oudshoorn.

Tobias was the "flag captain" of the 80-gun Dutch flagship Hollandia under Willem Joseph van Ghent from 1666-1667.

Tobias is noted for his valour during the Dutch Attack up the Thames River estuary Raid on the Medway in June 1667. During the battle he was aboard Lieutenant-Admiral Baron Willem Joseph van Ghent's frigate Agatha and charged with the reduction of the intentionally sunken English warships as an obstacle preventing the Dutch from continuing upriver.

Subsequently, he was ordered to lead the attack on the 80-gun English flagship Royal Charles. After the ship was taken as a prize, Tobias was charged to take command of the ship and prize crew in order to prepare it for the sea passage to the Netherlands. Tobias was required to further reduce the obstacles of sunken ships to allow the deep draft English capital ship to proceed out of the estuary. He then sailed the ship to Amsterdam where it became a great spectacle.

During the Third Anglo-Dutch War, Tobias was captain of the 50-gun Dutch man-o-war Beschermer (launched 1665). He also served as Admiral Cornelis Tromp's "flag captain" in several actions. His son Jan Thomas Tobiaszoon was also registered as an able seaman aboard Tromp's flagship. (3)

Tobias is last mentioned in 1673/4 as the captain of the 58-gun Dutch frigate Geloof during Admiral DeRuyter's second punitive expedition to the Caribbean and his attack on French Martinique.(2) The Geloof was noted to have taken several prizes during the expedition.

The Dutch historian Dr. Japp R. Bruijn also mentions that Thomas Tobias and Michel DeRuyter were close neighbors and friends. Early in DeRuyter's career he had been a merchant captain often trading in Ireland and was noted to be fluent in Irish. Bruijn estimates that eight percent of seamen serving in the Dutch Navy during the 17th century Anglo-Dutch wars were from the British Isles with a majority of those from Ireland.
