= Commandant of the Netherlands Marine Corps =

Head of the Dutch Marines

- Commandant van het Korps Mariniers
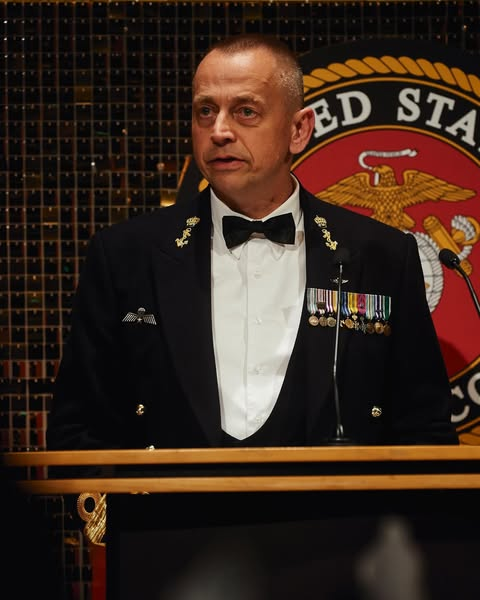
- Incumbent; Ivo D.L. Moerman since 11 October 2023
- Netherlands Marine Corps
- Precursor: Colonel and Commandant of the Regiment of Marines (1665–1669, 1678–1698); First Colonel of the Marine Regiment (1698–1711, 1772–1795); Commandant of the Marine Battalion (1814–1817); Commandant and Inspector of the Marine Corps (1850–1853, 1864–1871); Inspector of the Marine Corps (1909–1927); Chief of the Marine Corps (1927–1940)
- Formation: December 1665
- First holder: Willem Joseph baron van Ghent

The Commandant of the Netherlands Marine Corps (Dutch: Commandant van het Korps Mariniers, lit. 'Commander of the Corps of Marines') is the head of the Dutch marines. The current commandant, since 2023, is Ivo D.L. Moerman.

== History ==
=== 17th century ===
The billet was created in 1665 as the Colonel and Commandant of the Regiment of Marines (Dutch: Collonel en Commandant van het Regiment de Marine), first held by Willem Joseph baron van Ghent. It was known under that title until 1669 and from 1678 to 1698. From 1669 to 1678 it was known as the First Colonel of the Regiments of Ship Soldiers (Dutch: Eerste Collonel van de Regimenten Scheepssoldaten).

=== 18th century ===
From 1698 to 1711 and from 1772 to 1795, the billet was called First Colonel of the Marine Regiment (Dutch: Eerste Collonel van de Regimenten Mariniers). From 1711 to 1772 the billet was called Colonel and Commandant of the Marine Regiment (Dutch: Collonel en Commandant van het Regiment Mariniers).

=== 19th century ===
From 1814 to 1817 the billet was known as the Commandant of the Marine Battalion (Dutch: Commandant van het Bataillon Mariniers).

In 1817 it received its current title of Commandant of the Marine Corps. From 1850 to 1853 and 1864 to 1871 the billet was known as Commandant and Inspector of the Marine Corps (Dutch: Commandant van het Bataillon Mariniers).

=== 20th century ===
From 1909 to 1927 the billet was renamed to Inspector, then from 1927 to 1940 it was known as Chief. In 1940 it was renamed back to Commandant and has remained under that name.

== List of commandants ==
Chiefs / Colonels / Inspectors / First Colonels / Commandants of the Netherlands Marine Corps
#	Name	Rank	Tenure start	Tenure end	Title
1	Willem Joseph baron van Ghent	Colonel	18 December 1665	25 September 1669	Colonel and Commandant of the Regiment of Marines
1	Willem Joseph baron van Ghent	Colonel	25 September 1669	7 June 1672	First Colonel of the Ship Soldier Regiment
2	George Johan baron van Weede van Walenburgh	Colonel	7 June 1672	12 September 1678	First Colonel of the Ship Soldier Regiment
3	Johan Belgicus, graaf van Hoorn, baron van Boxtel, heer van Lokeren	Colonel	12 September 1678	30 December 1694	Colonel and Commandant of the Regiment of Marines
4	Willem van Soutelande	Colonel	30 December 1694	1 November 1698	Colonel and Commandant of the Regiment of Marines
4	Willem van Soutelande	Colonel	1 November 1698	1702	First Colonel of the Marine Regiment
5	Karel Willem baron de Sparre	Major general (until 1704 a lieutenant general)	1702	11 September 1709	First Colonel of the Marine Regiment
6	Philippe Claude Touroud de St. Amant	Major general	11 September 1709	7 September 1711	Major General and First Colonel of the Marine Regiment
7	Lodewijk baron van Leefdael	Colonel	7 September 1711	11 March 1729	Colonel and Commandant of the Marine Regiment
8	Jacob van Berchem	Colonel (after 1742 a major general)	11 March 1729	27 July 1744	Colonel and Commandant of the Marine Regiment
9	Willem van Dijssel	Colonel	27 July 1744	18 June 1745	Colonel and Commandant of the Marine Regiment
10	Dirk van Hoolwerf	Colonel (after 1747 a major general)	18 June 1745	21 May 1748	Colonel and Commandant of the Marine Regiment
For the period May 21, 1748 to July 23, 1763, no data is known about Regiments of Marines, but about ship detachments.
11	January Marius de Salve	Colonel (major general after 1766)	23 July 1763	21 September 1768	Colonel and Commandant of the Marine Regiment
12	Robert Douglas	Colonel	21 September 1768	24 August 1772	Colonel and Commandant of the Marine Regiment
12	Robert Douglas	Colonel	24 August 1772	1 July 1795	First Colonel of the Marine Regiment
From July 1, 1795 to February 6, 1814: no commander known.
13	P.R. Cantzelaar	Captain	6 February 1814	27 October 1815	Commandant of the Marine Battalion
14	J.Stelling	Major	8 November 1815	9 December 1816	Acting Commandant of the Marine Battalion
15	F.W. Fagel	Captain	9 December 1816	1 February 1817	Commandant of the Marine Battalion
16	P. Ziervogel	Captain	1 February 1817	3 December 1831	Commandant of the Marine Corps
17	R. de Sitter	Major	3 December 1831	22 July 1837	Acting Commandant of the Marine Corps
18	J.A. Besier	Lieutenant colonel	22 July 1837	16 November 1842	Acting Commandant of the Marine Corps
18	J.A. Besier	Lieutenant colonel	16 November 1842	30 April 1850	Commandant of the Marine Corps
19	J.D. Musquetier	Colonel	1 May 1850	1 January 1853	Commandant and Inspector of the Marine Corps
20	G.C. Zoutman	Captain lieutenant	1 January 1853	11 March 1855	Commandant of the Marine Corps
21	C.M. Nabal	Lieutenant colonel	1 April 1855	1 May 1858	Commandant of the Marine Corps
22	A.J. Voet	Captain	1 May 1858	1 May 1864	Commandant of the Marine Corps
23	H. Camp	Captain	1 May 1864	1 May 1871	Commandant and Inspector of the Marine Corps
24	D. Vreedenburg	Colonel	1 May 1871	1 May 1875	Commandant of the Marine Corps
25	J.H. Stengel	Colonel	1 May 1875	1 November 1881	Commandant of the Marine Corps
26	Floris Adriaan van Braam Houckgeest	Colonel	1 November 1881	1 May 1892	Commandant of the Marine Corps
27	A.H.W. de Gelder	Colonel	1 May 1892	1 May 1896	Commandant of the Marine Corps
28	J.H. van Wely	Colonel	1 May 1896	1 August 1903	Commandant of the Marine Corps
29	J.B. Verheij	Colonel	1 August 1903	17 September 1903	Commandant of the Marine Corps
30	J.R.J.P. Cambier	Colonel	17 September 1903	17 August 1908	Commandant of the Marine Corps
31	A.P. Timmers	Colonel	17 August 1908	1 April 1909	Commandant of the Marine Corps
		Colonel	1 April 1909	1 April 1913	Inspector of the Marine Corps
32	G.A. Linckers	Colonel	1 April 1913	1 September 1917	Inspector of the Marine Corps
33	L. De Jonge Oudraat	Colonel	1 September 1917	1 September 1920	Inspector of the Marine Corps
34	C.P. van Borselen	Colonel	1 September 1920	2 August 1924	Inspector of the Marine Corps
35	P.S. Groen	Colonel	2 August 1924	1 January 1927	Inspector of the Marine Corps
36	J. Oele	Colonel	1 January 1927	1 November 1934	Chief of the Marine Corps
37	Corneille Jacques Odilon Dorren	Colonel	1 November 1934	1 September 1938	Chief of the Marine Corps
38	H.F.J.M.A. von Frijtag Drabbe	Colonel	1 September 1938	15 June 1940	Chief of the Marine Corps
38	H.F.J.M.A. von Frijtag Drabbe	Major general	15 June 1940	1 March 1948	Commandant of the Marine Corps
39	Mattheus de Bruyne	Major general (from 16 February 1953 to 27 February 1953 a lieutenant general)	1 March 1948	15 February 1953	Commandant of the Marine Corps
40	P.J. van Gijn	Major general	27 February 1953	13 September 1954	Commandant of the Marine Corps
41	Henri Otto Romswinckel	Major general	23 September 1954	17 July 1958	Commandant of the Marine Corps
42	H. Lieftinck	Major general	17 July 1958	1 July 1960	Commandant of the Marine Corps
43	Johannes Gerardus Maria van Nass	Major general	1 July 1960	17 February 1967	Commandant of the Marine Corps
44	A.M. Luijk	Major general	17 February 1967	10 April 1970	Commandant of the Marine Corps
45	C.C. Schoenzetter	Major general	10 April 1970	19 April 1973	Commandant of the Marine Corps
46	A.C. Lamers	Major general	19 April 1973	1 February 1977	Commandant of the Marine Corps
47	A.J. Romijn	Major general	1 February 1977	10 January 1980	Commandant of the Marine Corps
48	J.J.A. den Haan	Major general	10 January 1980	7 January 1983	Commandant of the Marine Corps
49	T. Rudolphie	Major general	7 January 1983	18 September 1987	Commandant of the Marine Corps
50	W.J.I. van Breukelen	Major general	18 September 1987	3 October 1991	Commandant of the Marine Corps
51	Roy Spiekerman van Weezelenburg	Major general	3 October 1991	16 December 1995	Commandant of the Marine Corps
52	E.C. Klop	Major general	16 December 1995	6 September 2001	Commandant of the Marine Corps
53	Willem A.J. Prins	Major general	6 September 2001	9 September 2004	Commandant of the Marine Corps
54	R. Zuiderwijk	Major general	9 September 2004	24 August 2007	Commandant of the Marine Corps
55	R. Verkerk	Brigadier general	24 August 2007	30 March 2012	Commandant of the Marine Corps
56	R.G. Oppelaar	Brigadier general	30 March 2012	18 March 2016	Commandant of the Marine Corps
57	F.V. van Sprang	Brigadier general	18 March 2016	25 August 2017	Commandant of the Marine Corps
58	Jeff Mac Mootry	Brigadier general	25 August 2017	11 December 2020	Commandant of the Marine Corps
59	Jan Hut	Brigadier general	11 December 2020	11 October 2023	Commandant of the Marine Corps
60	Ivo D.L. Moerman	Brigadier general	11 October 2023	present	Commandant of the Marine Corps
