= Jan Meppel =

Dutch States Navy officer

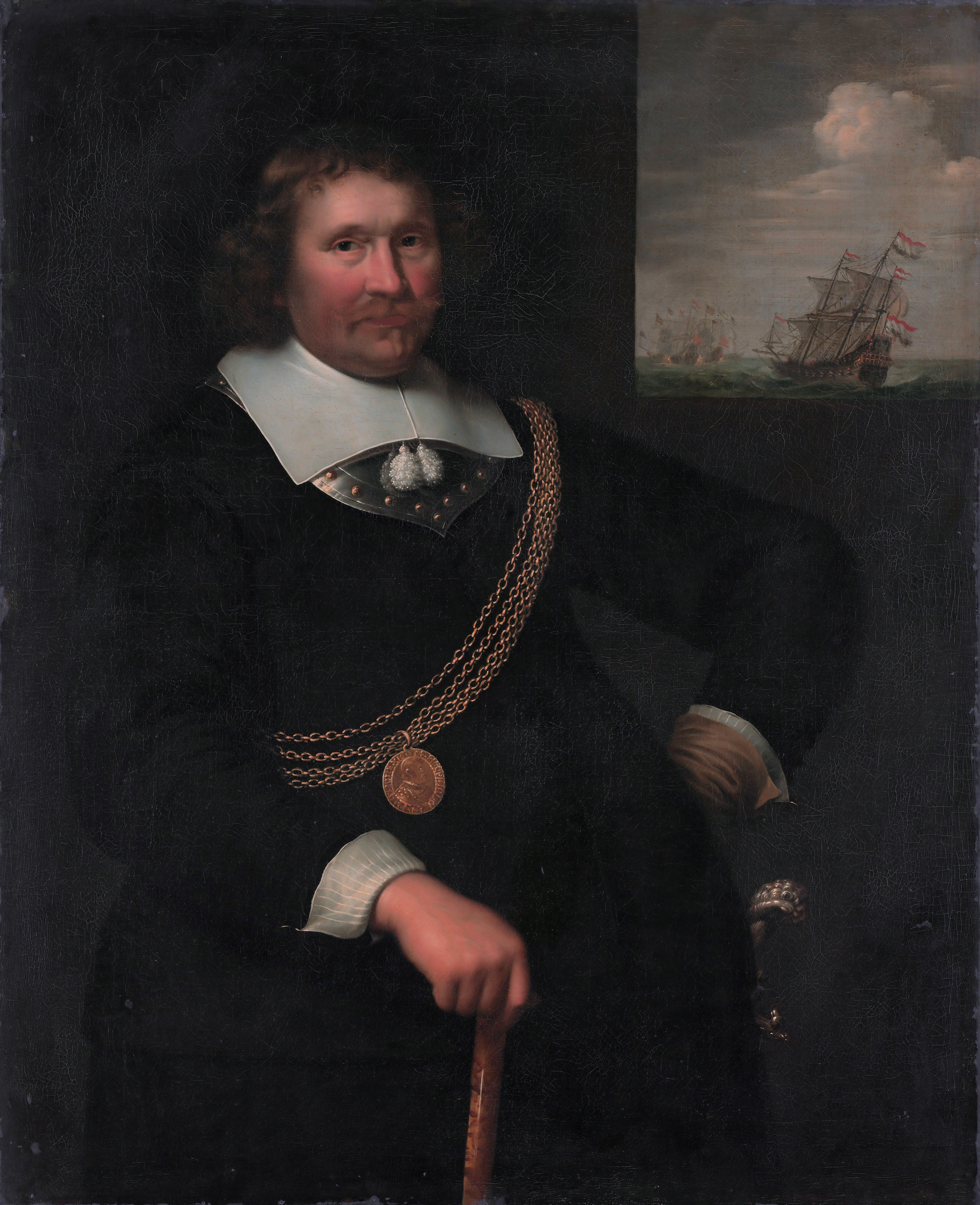
Portrait by Jan Rotius, 1661

Jan Corneliszoon Meppel (c. 1609 – 2 November 1669) was a Dutch States Navy officer who took the place of Pieter Floriszoon as vice-admiral at the Admiralty of the Northern Quarter after his death. He fought in the Four Days' Battle, the St. James's Day Battle, and the Raid on the Medway.

== Biography ==
In May 1659, he departed with Vice-Admiral Michiel de Ruyter's squadron, which was intended to reinforce Lieutenant-Admiral van Wassenaar's fleet in the Baltic Sea. However, the summer passed without any action, and in November, Meppel returned with Wassenaar, while De Ruyter remained in Denmark.

Meanwhile, the Commonwealth had become embroiled in a war with the Barbary pirate states. To subdue them, Vice-Admiral de Ruyter, and under his command, Meppel, were sent to the Mediterranean Sea, where they destroyed many pirate ships and protected trade. After the peace treaty, the fleet returned to the fatherland in the spring of 1663, but was sent to sea again in May 1664, when the pirates broke the peace.

In 1664, he joined De Ruyter's expedition to West Africa and his failed attack on Barbados, and therefore was not present at the crushing defeat in the Battle of Lowestoft. They returned to the fatherland, on 6 August 1665. De Ruyter was immediately given supreme command of the fleet, and Meppel, as Lieutenant Admiral of the Northern Quarter, was placed under his command.

When the fleet put to sea in the spring of 1666, Meppel belonged to the 3rd Squadron, which, under the command of Lieutenant Admiral Cornelis Tromp, formed the rearguard in the famous Four Days' Battle. On the fourth day, he, along with Lieutenant Admiral Tjerk Hiddes de Vries, Vice Admirals Banckers, Schram, and Coenders, and Rear Admiral Bruinsveld, broke through the English line at the halfway point of the battle, thus contributing significantly to the brilliant victory achieved by the Dutch fleet. In the subsequent St. James' Day Battle, Meppel again belonged to the part of the fleet commanded by Lieutenant Admiral Aert Jansse van Nes, which was to guard the mouth of the River Thames. On 2 August 1667, Meppel was sent with five warships and twelve fireships to attack Vice Admiral Edward Spragge, who, however, did not wait for him, but retreated to Gravesand. Several English fireships were destroyed in the process. On 5 August, the fleet engaged in a fierce battle with the English under Jordan, but emerged victorious.

The Treaty of Breda (1667) was concluded soon afterward, and Meppel's name is no longer mentioned. He died in July 1669 in Hoorn, where he had a house built, and his portrait and sword are still in the possession of the Berckhout family.
