= Volckert Schram =

Dutch States Navy officer

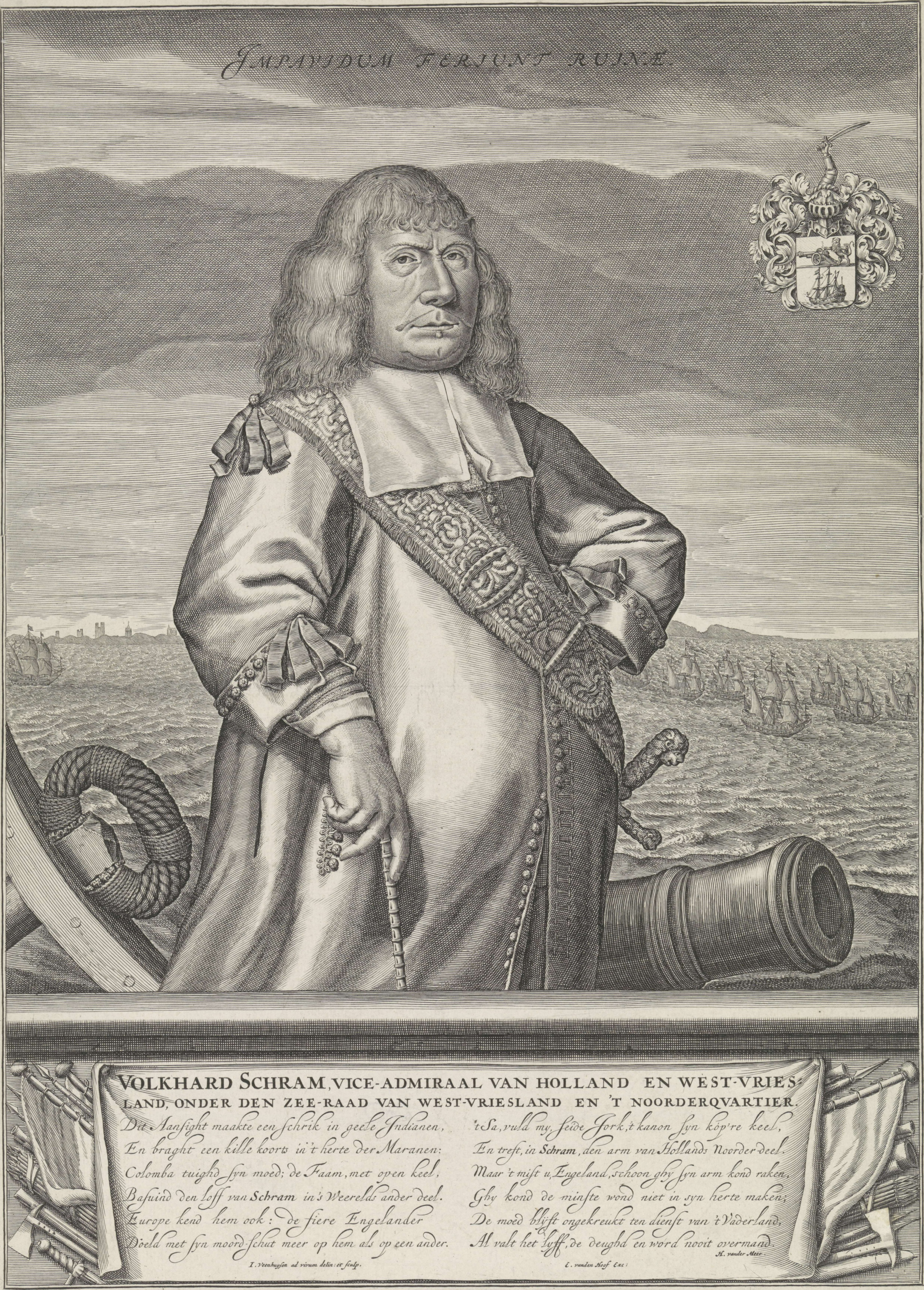
Volkert Schram

Vice-Admiral Volckert Adriaanszoon Schram (died 7 June 1673) was a Dutch States Navy officer.
