= Dutch ship De Zeven Provinciën (1665) =

1665 ship of the line of the Dutch Navy

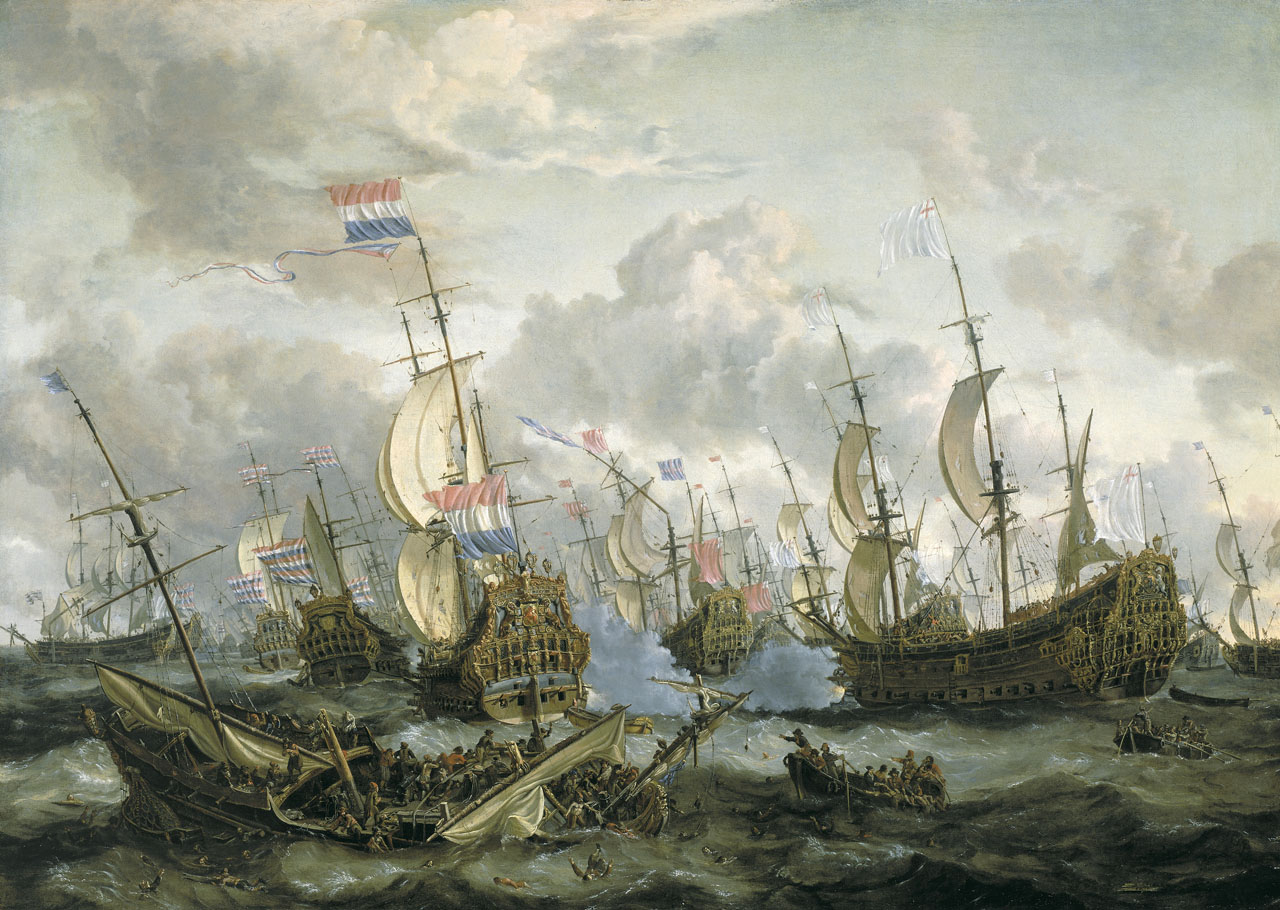
- Four Days' Battle with the Zeven Provinciën in the foreground.

History

Dutch Republic
- Name: De Zeven Provinciën
- Builder: Salomon Janszoon van den Tempel, Rotterdam
- Fate: Broken up in 1694

General characteristics
- Class & type: 80-gun ship of the line
- Length: 151 ft (c. 46 m) (gundeck)
- Beam: 40 ft (c. 12 m)
- Depth of hold: 15 ft (c. 4.7 m)
- Propulsion: Sails
- Sail plan: Full-rigged ship
- Armament: 80 guns (later 76 guns): Gundeck: 12 × 36-pounders, 16 × 24-pounders (later 28 × 36-pounders); Upper gundeck: 14 × 18-pounders, 12 × 12-pounders; Quarterdeck, Forecastle & Poop deck: 26 × 6-pounders

De Zeven Provinciën (Dutch: "the seven provinces") was a Dutch ship of the line, originally armed with 80 guns. The name of the ship refers to the seven autonomous provinces that made up the Dutch Republic in the 17th century. The vessel was built in 1664-65 for the Admiralty of de Maze in Rotterdam by the master shipbuilder Salomon Jansz van den Tempel.

== History ==
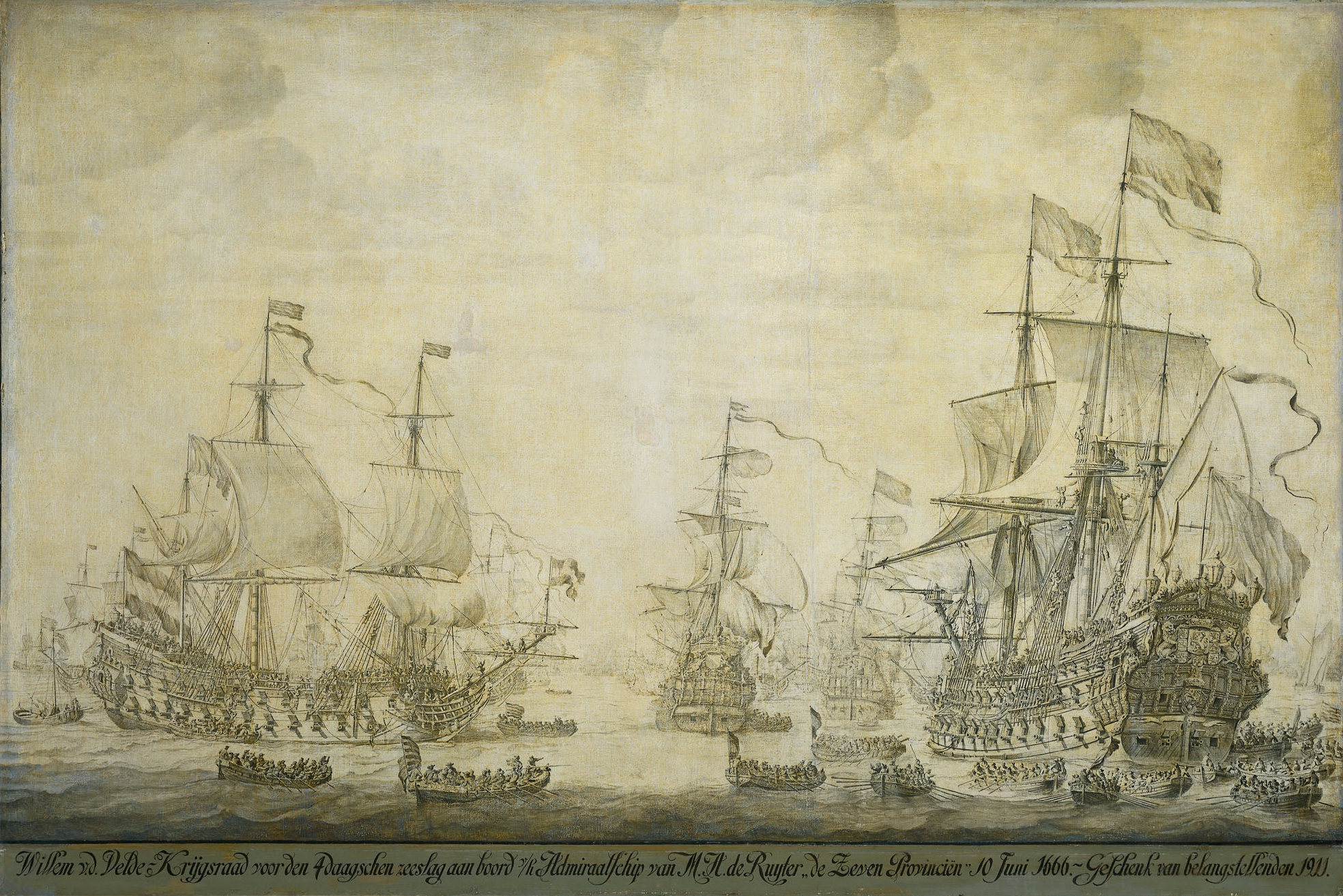
The Council of War on board 'De Zeven Provinciën', 10 June 1666, by Willem van de Velde the Elder.

The ship served as Admiral Michiel de Ruyter's flagship during the Second Anglo-Dutch War, taking part in the Dutch victory at the Four Days Fight and the defeat at the St. James's Day Battle, and acting as a command post as well as blockading the River Thames during the Raid on the Medway. The vessel performed well throughout the war, though it was partially dismasted during the Four Days Fight.

De Ruyter used De Zeven Provinciën as his flagship during the Third Anglo-Dutch War of 1672-1673. The ship served in all four major battles against the combined English and French fleet, fighting in the Battle of Solebay, Battle of Schooneveld and Battle of the Texel. In 1674 the ship went to the West Indies.

In 1692 the ship, now armed with only 76 guns, fought at the Battles of Barfleur and La Hogue during the War of the Grand Alliance. The vessel was severely damaged during the fight and, in 1694, De Zeven Provinciën had to be broken up.

== Description ==
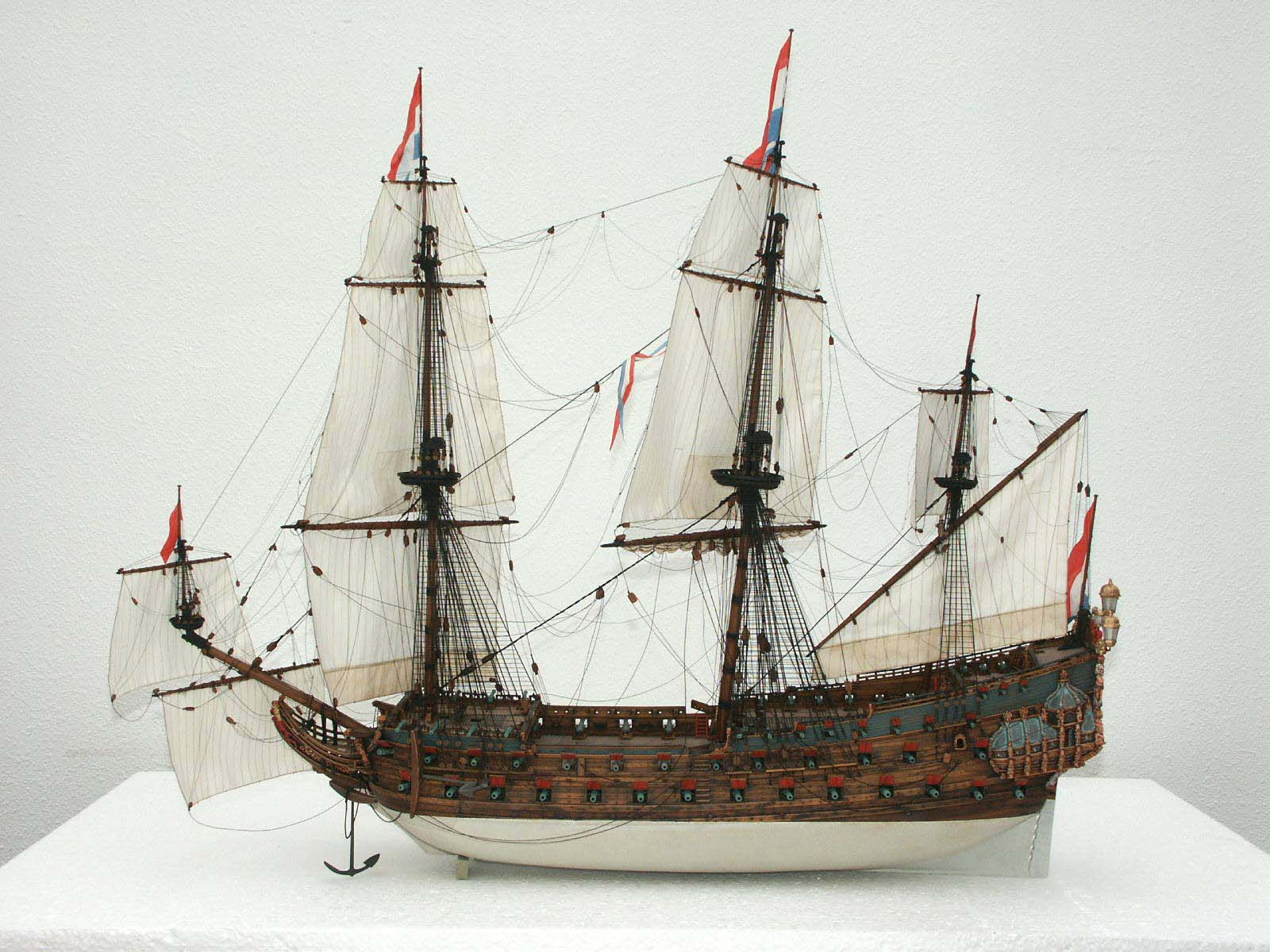
Model (scale 1:87) of De Zeven Provinciën, built by Herbert Tomesen for the Bataviawerf in the Netherlands

De Zeven Provinciën was 151 ft (46 m) long and 40 ft (over 12 m) wide, and had a draft of over 15 ft (c. 4.7 m). It was 1600 tons and had a crew of 420. It was originally armed with twelve 36-pounders and sixteen 24-pounders on the lower deck (although this had changed to an all 36-pounder battery by the time of the Third Anglo-Dutch War), fourteen 18-pounders and twelve 12-pounders on the upper deck, and twenty-six 6-pounders on the forecastle, quarterdeck, and poop deck.

== Replica ==
In 1995 a full-size replica of the ship was started at the Batavia-werf (docks) in Lelystad; but due to severe technical problems that work was completely wrecked. In 2008, a new replica began to be constructed.

On the evening of October 13, 2008, a fire ripped through the Batavia-werf. Although the sailmaking shed, several office buildings and part of a restaurant were destroyed, as were the sails of fellow replica ship Batavia, the replica of "De Zeven Provinciën" nearby was undamaged. In 2014 work on the ship stopped due to lack of funding.

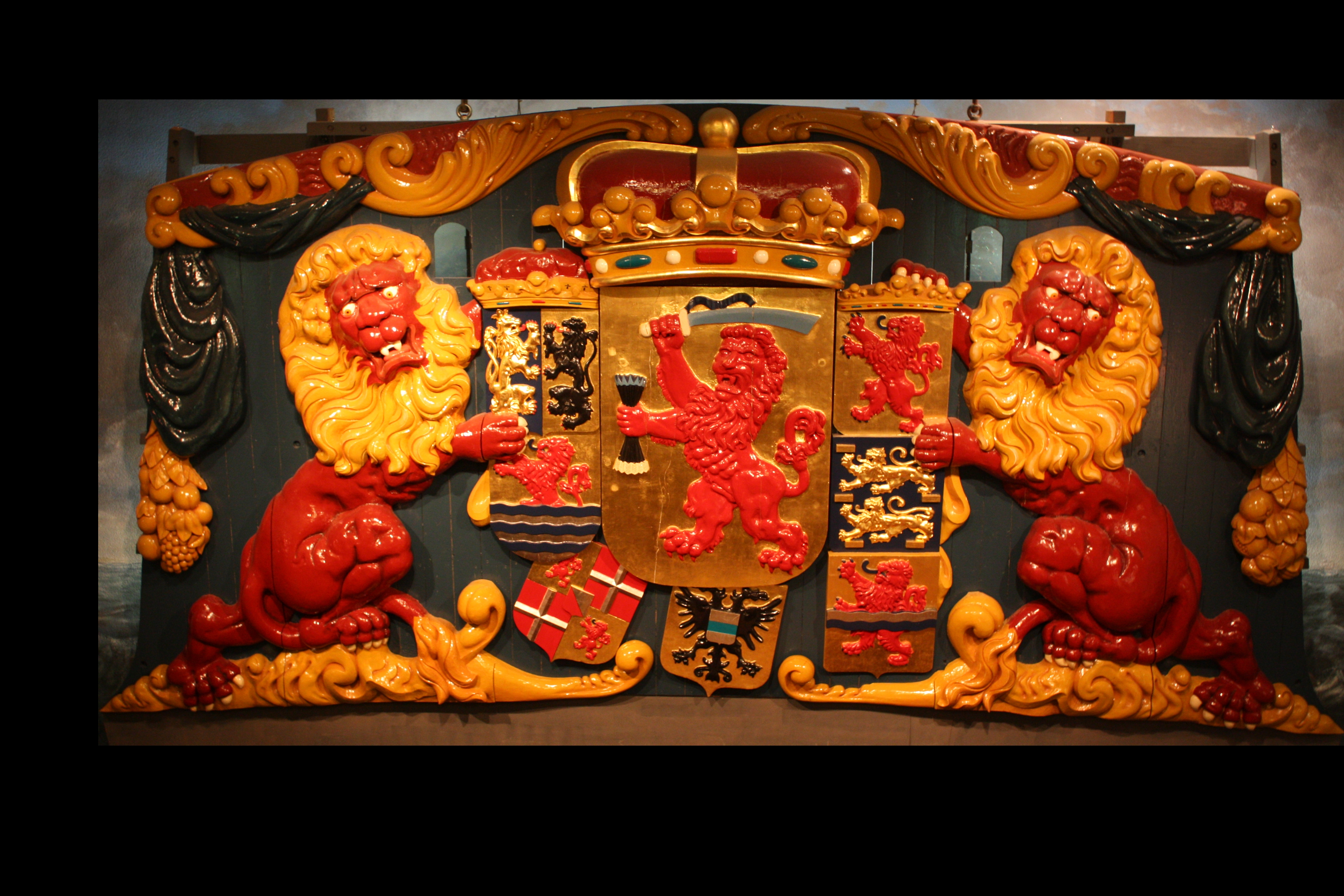

Replica of the Sternpiece of the Zeven Provincien showing the arms to the Union and each of the member States.

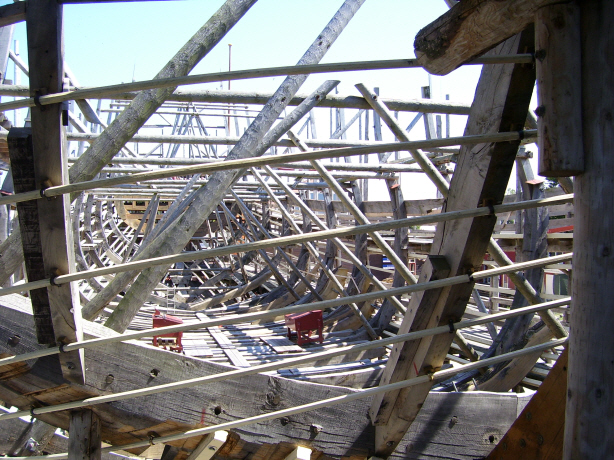

The construction of a ship replica of De Zeven Provinciën
