= Dutch States Navy =

- Staatse vloot
- The ensign of the Dutch States Navy. It consisted of seven stripes, one for each province of the Dutch Republic.
- Active: 1588–1815
- Country: Dutch Republic
- Branch: Navy
- Size: ~10,500 active duty personnel ~850 reserve personnel ~70–100 ships of the line ~100 frigates ~100 other tall ships
- Part of: Naval Committee of the States General
- Headquarters: 1 per admiralty, Rotterdam, Amsterdam, Middelburg, Dokkum and Harlingen, Hoorn and Enkhuizen
- Engagements: Eighty Years' War; Dutch–Portuguese War; Anglo-Dutch Wars; Northern Wars; Franco-Dutch War; Nine Years' War; War of the Spanish Succession; War of the Austrian Succession; War of the First Coalition

Commanders
- Notable commanders: Piet Pieterszoon Hein, Maarten Tromp, Michiel de Ruyter, Cornelis Tromp

Insignia
- Naval ensign: Prince's Flag (1588–1630) Statenvlag (1630–1795)

- Naval jack

- Coat of arms (1588–1665)

- Coat of arms (1665–1795)

- Escutcheon

The Dutch States Navy (Dutch: Staatse vloot, lit. 'States fleet') was the navy of the Dutch Republic from 1588 to 1795. Coming into existence during the Eighty Years' War, the States Navy played a major role in expanding and protecting the Dutch colonial empire, in addition to participating in numerous conflicts with rival European powers. The States Navy consisted of five admiralties, which were respectively based in Amsterdam, Friesland, the Noorderkwartier, Rotterdam and Zeeland. This organisational structure contributed to the decentralised nature of the States Navy, which heavily relied upon privateers and armed merchantmen in times of war.

In addition to the Eighty Years' War, the States Navy also participated in the Anglo-Dutch Wars, the Dutch–Portuguese War, the Northern Wars, the Franco-Dutch War and various conflicts of the French–Habsburg rivalry. It also played a major role in protecting Dutch overseas trade, including Dutch involvement in the triangular trade and the Atlantic slave trade. As a result of the War of the First Coalition, the Dutch Republic ceased to exist in 1795, being succeeded by the Batavian Republic; the States Navy was correspondingly transformed into the Batavian Navy. The current navy of the Netherlands, the Royal Netherlands Navy, is the modern successor of the States Navy and inherited many of its traditions.

== Genesis ==
Naval policy in the Netherlands was originally decentralized. Each port area would fit out fleets to combat pirates and other threats to navigation paid for by the local merchants. The title of Admiral (from the Arab emir al-bahr), for naval commanders of ships which protected commercial convoys against piracy, already existed temporarily in the different parts of the Low Countries.. It was Louis II of Flanders who first appointed a permanent government official called admiral in Flanders at Dunkirk in 1383 with responsibilities and funding from the central government.

The Burgundian and Habsburg rulers started a central policy of naval organization, defense and offense. In 1488 they established an Admiralty of the Netherlands at Veere by the Ordinance on the Admiralty issued 8 January. The admiralty of Flanders was made a vice-admiralty and subordinated to the Admiralty at Veere.

Still, the interests of the central government did not always match those of the regions, so that the regions regularly sent out their own fleets.

== Uprising ==
The Dutch Navy began with and traces its roots back to the Sea Beggars.

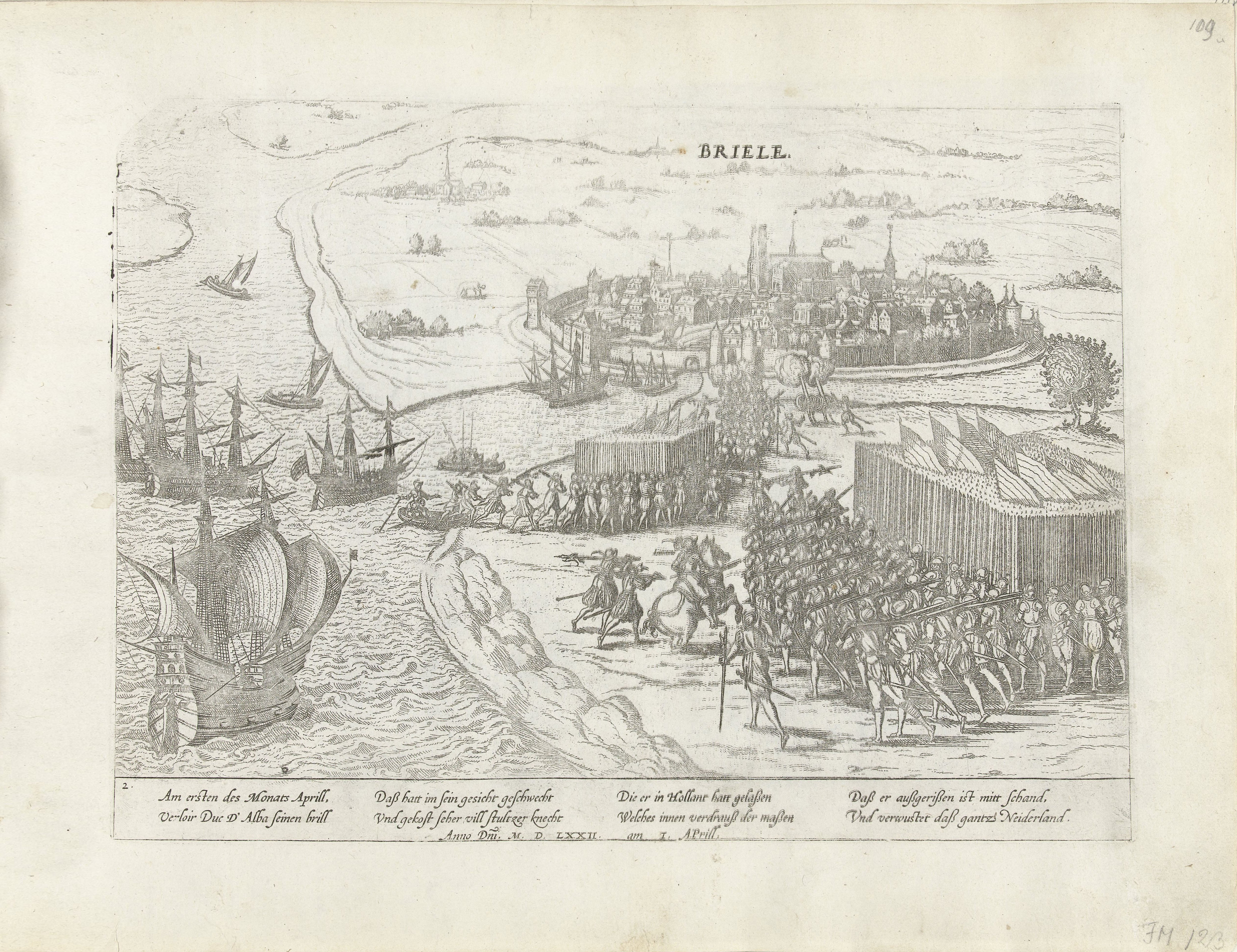
Capture of Brielle, 1 April 1572 (Frans Hogenberg).

In 1569 William of Orange, who had now openly placed himself at the head of the party of revolt, granted letters of marque as monarch of the sovereign Principality of Orange, to a number of vessels manned by crews of desperadoes drawn from all nationalities. Eighteen ships received letters of marque, which were equipped under his brother, Louis of Nassau, in the French Huguenot port of La Rochelle. They were called "Sea Beggars", "Gueux de mer" in French, or "Watergeuzen" in Dutch. The Sea Beggars continued to use La Rochelle as a base, as well as English ports. By the end of 1569, already 84 Sea Beggars ships were in action. The Sea Beggars were also adept at land borne operations, which made capturing coastal cities attractive.

They were under the command of a succession of daring and reckless leaders, the best-known of whom is William de la Marck, Lord of Lumey. At first they were content merely to plunder both by sea and land, carrying their booty to the English ports where they were able to refit and replenish their stores. However, in 1572, Queen Elizabeth I of England, seeking to placate Philip II of Spain, abruptly refused to admit the Sea Beggars to her harbours. No longer having refuge, the Sea Beggars, under the command of Willem Bloys van Treslong, made a desperate attack upon Brielle, which they seized by surprise in the absence of the Spanish garrison on 1 April 1572. Encouraged by this success, they now sailed to the larger port of Vlissingen, which was also taken by a coup de main. The capture of these two towns prompted several nearby towns to declare for revolt, starting a chain reaction that resulted in the majority of Holland joining in a general revolt of the Netherlands, and is regarded as the real beginning of Dutch independence.

In 1573 the Sea Beggars defeated a Spanish squadron under the command of Admiral Bossu off the port of Hoorn in the Battle on the Zuiderzee. Mixing with the native population, they quickly sparked rebellions against Spanish rule and the Spanish Governor-General of the Netherlands, the Duke of Alba, in town after town and spread the resistance southward.

Some of the forefathers of the Dutch naval heroes began their naval careers as Sea Beggars, such as Evert Heindricxzen, the grandfather of Cornelis Evertsen the Elder.

== Admiralities ==
see Admiralties (Dutch)

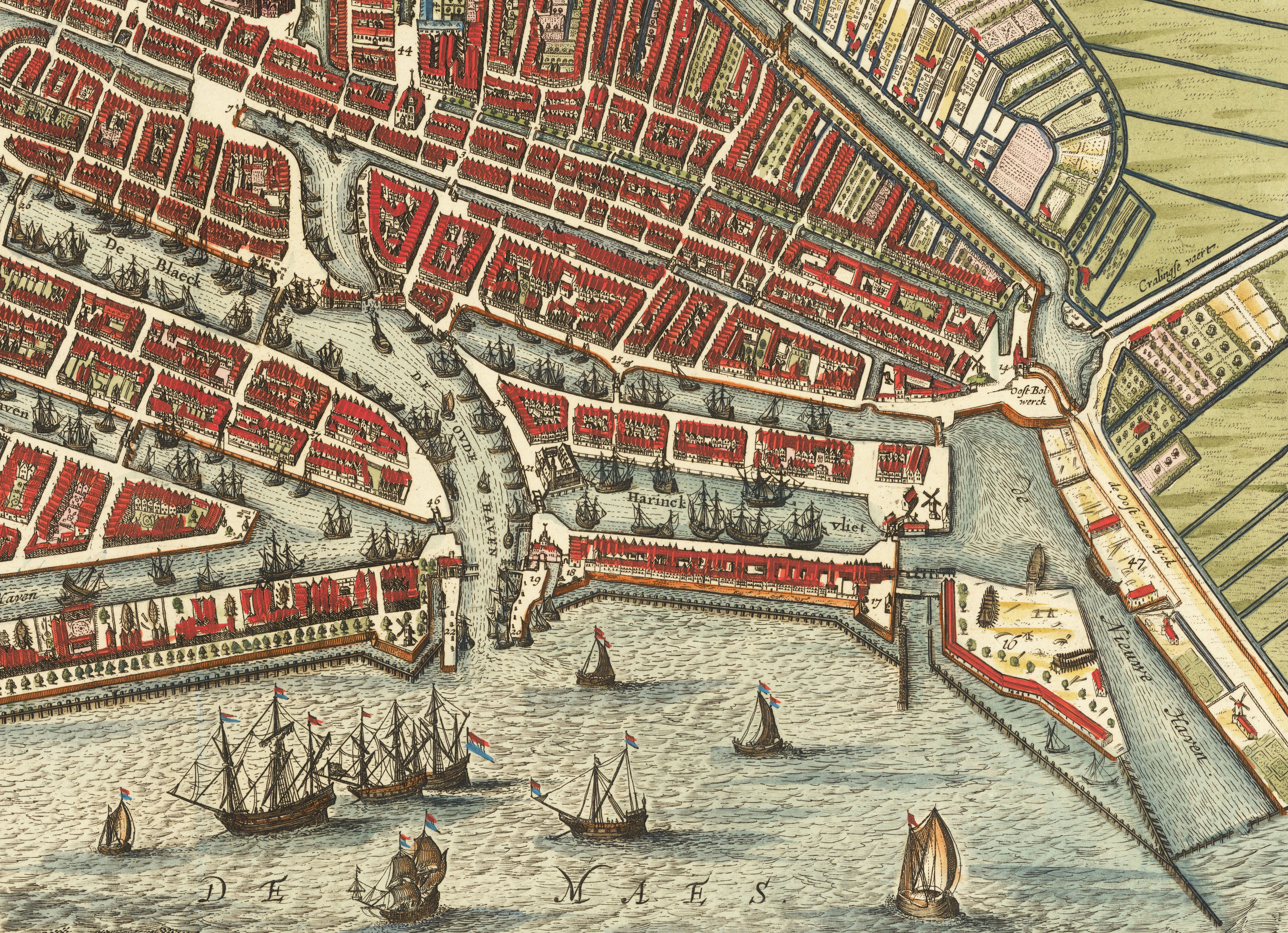
Map of the Haringvliet in 1690

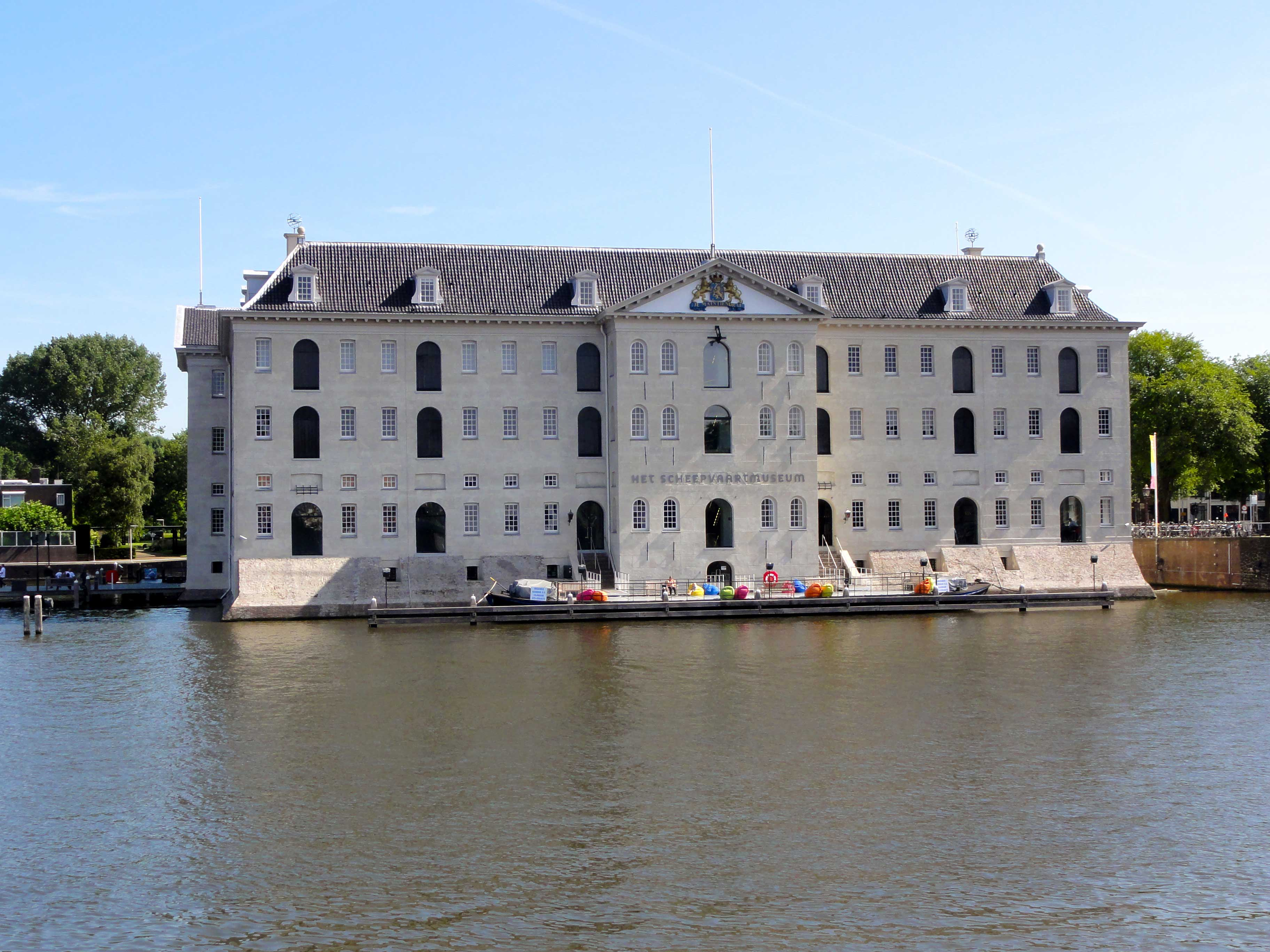
's Lands Zeemagazijn (English "the arsenal"), former arsenal of the Admiralty of Amsterdam

The success of the Dutch Revolt required a better system of naval governance. In 1586, the then governor-general, Robert Dudley, 1st Earl of Leicester, established a new instruction for the Admiralty. Based on this new instruction, the admiralty councils in Veere, Rotterdam and Hoorn were founded. An admiralty council was also founded in Ostend. Ostend, however, was since 1572 under the influence of Zeeland, and under pressure from Zeeland, this admiralty was abolished in the following year. After the three-year siege of Ostend, the city's admiralty was put under the Dunkirk Admiralty founded by Parma in 1583.

In 1596 there was an attempt by the States-General to centralize the administration of the navy in the form of one College of Admiralty consisting of delegates from all the provinces. Provincial particularism, however, ensured that months later this was cast aside. The competition between the differing admiralties became so grim that Zeeland and Holland impounded each other's ships, and Elizabeth I of England tried to broker a reconciliation. On 13 August 1597 the States-General issued an Instruction for the Admiralties which established the management of naval affairs for the Republic until 1795. Within a few years there were five different admiralty colleges located at:

- Admiralty of the Maas (Rotterdam)
- Admiralty of Amsterdam
- Admiralty of Zeeland (Middleburg)
- Admiralty of Friesland (Dokkum, after 1645 Harlingen)
- Admiralty of the Noorderkwartier (alternating Hoorn and Enkhuizen)

The Admiralty colleges were governed by the Lord (Heeren) Councils in Admiralty or just Council of the Admiralty. As Stadholder, the princes of Orange that succeeded Maurice were also appointed to his offices and so were Admiral General of the Union and Chairman of the colleges. Through this mechanism they were able to provide central control and coordination to naval affairs. The prince was represented in each college by a lieutenant-admiral, who was assisted by a judge-advocate and a secretary. If there was no Stadholder—as between 1650 and 1672—the States-General had the final responsibility. In practice, therefore, this concentrated that supervisory power in the councilor pensionary of Holland. Although the Admiralty colleges were organs of the Union and thus accountable to the States-General, the bodies were regional. The regions had a lot of influence, despite the joint meetings in The Hague and the influence of the Prince of Orange and/or the councilor pensionary of Holland. As the admiralty with the most money and fitting out the most ships, the Admiralty of Amsterdam had the most influence.

The Admiralty colleges had the task of protecting coastal waters and the commercial fleet, which included the Dutch East India Company fleet. To support this, they had the power to levy tax funds through convoys and licenses (import and export duties) and thus pay for the equipment of the navy. The other main task of the admiralties was to build, maintain and equip the navy. The admiralties were also entitled to act as judge in disputes and as a prize court. The admiralties independently nominated and commissioned junior officers. Flag officers and captains were appointed by the States-General, on the recommendation of the Admiralty. Originally, the admiralty ships were leased or advanced by merchant companies. Later in the 17th century, in order to meet the heavier ships of the line of the Royal Navy on equal terms, ships were built to purpose as heavy warships/ships of the line for continuous naval service. This innovation is due mainly to Johan de Witt. To carry out their duties, the admiralties possessed yards, warehouses and offices.

In 1795 the admiralties were replaced by a central Admiralty in the Batavian Republic and later the Kingdom of Holland. After the French period (1814), it became the Department of the Navy of the Royal Netherlands Navy that is the direct successor to the Dutch Fleet.

== Commander-in-Chief of the Dutch Navy ==
see Lieutenant Admiral-General

In 1588 Supreme Command of the Fleet was given by the States General to Prince Maurits as commander in chief of the army and navy. In the case of the navy, his rank was "Admiral General". Maurice's successors as princes of Orange, as Stadholder of Holland, Zealand, and etc., were appointed, in addition to their role as Captain General of the Army, Admiral General of the Navy. The Admiral General was commander-in-chief of the fleet and chairman of the Admiralty colleges. In this capacity he was able to provide central direction to naval policy over the five separate admiralties.

In practice, as the Stadholder/Admiral General never fought in person with the fleet, his day-to-day supreme command of the fleet devolved upon the leading lieutenant-admiral from among those of that rank from the different admiralties. This officer functioned as a joint commander (gezamenlijke bevelvoerder) of the naval admirals, a chief or as he came to be called the Chef of Ghemaghtigde der Staeten op 's-Landts Vloot (Chief Representative of the States on the Nation's Fleet). During the Stadholderless times when no Admiral General was appointed the supreme authority of the fleet was the States-General in the person of the Chef.

From time to time, especially during the Stadholderless periods, the States General also appointed one or several deputies to accompany the fleet. It was in this capacity that Cornelis de Witt accompanied the fleet in the Second Anglo-Dutch War and the Raid on the Medway.

The lieutenant-admirals of each admiralty were appointed on the basis of experience and expertise. Those from the Admiralty of the Maas, as the oldest admiralty, had a claim to command and precedence over those from the other admiralties. Similarly, the lieutenant-admirals of the Amsterdam Admiralty had a claim to precedence as the representatives of the largest and richest admiralty that fitted out the largest part of the fleet. The Chef was usually appointed from one of those admiralties. That role fell first to Maarten Tromp. When Michiel de Ruyter was given command of the fleet, his commission as lieutenant-admiral was transferred from Zealand to Amsterdam.

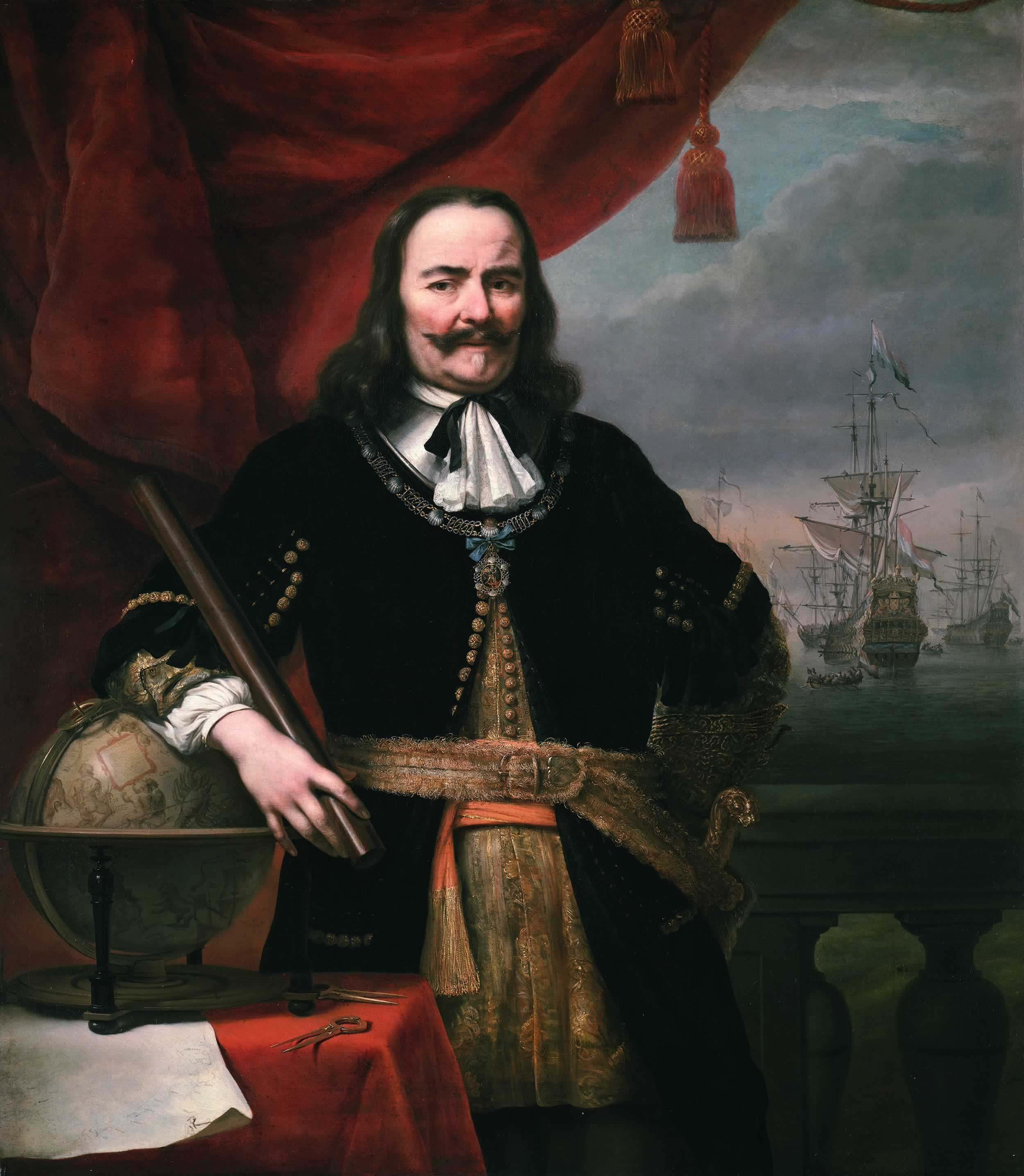
Michiel de Ruyter by Ferdinand Bol in 1667. He wears his Order of Saint Michael.

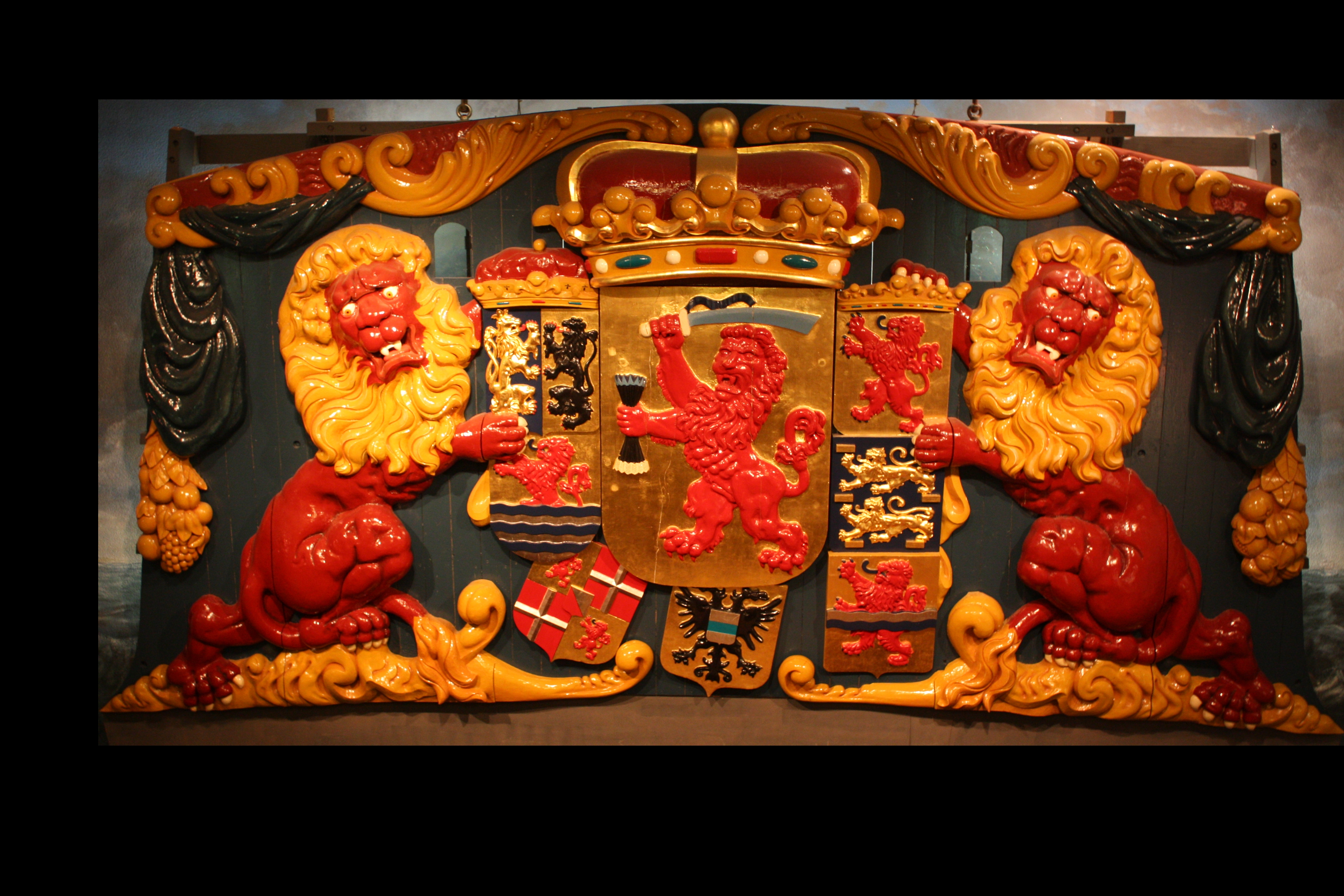
Replica of the Sternpiece of the Zeven Provinciën showing the arms of the Union and each of the member States.

- Piet Hein chef, (26 March 1629 – 18 June 1629)
- Philips van Dorp chef,(1632 – 1653)
- Maarten Harpertszoon Tromp chef,(1637–1653)
- Jacob van Wassenaer Obdam chef,(1653–1665)
- Michiel de Ruyter chef,(1665–1676), Lieutenant Admiral-General (rank created for him by William III of Orange) (February 1673–1676)
- Cornelis Tromp chef, (1676–1684), Lieutenant Admiral-General (6 February 1679 – 1691)
- Cornelis Evertsen the Youngest chef, (1 April 1684 – 1690)
- Cornelis Tromp chef, (1690–1691)
- Philips van Almonde chef (1691–1711)

The rank of Lieutenant Admiral General in the Netherlands was created in February 1673 by the Stadholder William III for Michiel de Ruyter to cement his authority and prestige above the other lieutenant-admirals of the Navy and ensure undivided command of the fleet. De Ruyter had functioned since the Second Anglo-Dutch War with the rank of lieutenant-admiral as commander in chief, without rank higher than the other lieutenant-admirals. To put an end to this situation, but also in recognition of his great achievements, De Ruyter received a new grade of Lieutenant Admiral General. He was not Admiral-General, to emphasize that the authority of the 1672 appointment to Stadholder of Prince William III was not affected.

After the death of De Ruyter in 1676 this rank was offered to Cornelis Tromp on 6 February 1679 to persuade him to be commander in chief of the Dutch navy. The delay was due to the fact that Tromp was in the Danish service as their Admiral General. After the death of Cornelis Tromp in 1691, the rank was not assigned to any other naval officer. Formally Tromp never held this rank; he died before he could occupy the rank in Dutch service. The Stadholder-King William III then ordered that this rank may no longer be used. Possible reasons were that the rank of Lieutenant-Admiral-General of the fallen De Ruyter looked too similar to the role of Admiral General of the Dutch fleet and that William had earlier sent De Ruyter with an inadequate fleet to the Mediterranean against a much larger French fleet.

A Fleet Guardian ("Vlootvoogd") was generally also appointed and functioned as a deputy fleet commander. Although the term admiral is used in many books, this is not an official rank or title. It was the name popularly given to commanders of a naval fleet or part of it, whose actual rank could be admiral, lieutenant-admiral, vice-admiral, or rear-admiral.

== Deputy of the States General to the Fleet ==
From time to time, the States-General appointed a deputy or deputies (gedeputeerden) or representatives to accompany the fleet and exercise political supervision on behalf of the Republic. These officials were responsible for conveying instructions, reporting to the States-General, and ensuring coordination between the naval command and the civil authorities. The most famous example was Cornelis de Witt, who accompanied Lieutenant-Admiral Michiel de Ruyter during the Second Anglo-Dutch War and the Raid on the Medway in 1667.

== Financing ==
see also: Economic history of the Netherlands (1500–1815)

Unlike most contemporary armies, which relied heavily on mercenaries, the Dutch navy was composed primarily of native sailors, reflecting the maritime character of Dutch society and its urban economies.

The financial institutions in the Dutch Republic, particularly its banking and credit system, allowed it to mobilize large amounts of capital at relatively low interest rates. This facilitated the construction and maintenance of fleets that were larger and better equipped than the Republic's population might otherwise suggest. The Republic's population in the 17th century was roughly 1.5 million, small compared with England (approximately 4 to 5 million), Spain (approximately 10 million) and France (approximately 20 million). Yet, Dutch ships and sailors were able to contest European maritime powers effectively.

The financial model of the Dutch navy, similar to that of the States Army, helped shape the organization of the fleet. Admiralties were empowered to levy taxes on imports and exports and collect convoy duties, providing a semi-autonomous revenue stream that funded shipbuilding, maintenance, and officer salaries. This combination of strong financial institutions and decentralized fiscal authority allowed the Dutch Republic to "punch above its weight" in European naval warfare, sustaining a professional navy that could operate year-round, rather than only in times of crisis.

== Strength ==
see: List of ships of the line of the Dutch Republic, List of ships of the line of the Royal Navy

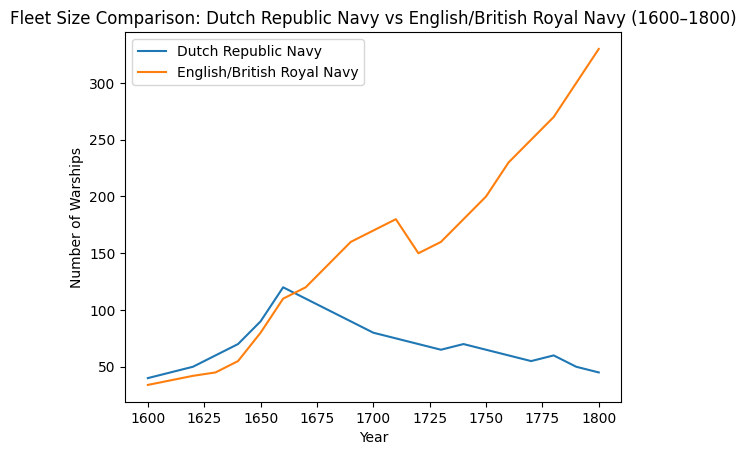
Comparative graph Dutch Republic Navy vs English British Royal Navy from 1600-1800. Around 1700 shows approximately when the English Royal Navy definitely overtook the Dutch Navy in overall strength.

The line graph and the charts below shows the **number of warships in the Dutch Republic Navy vs the English/British Royal Navy from 1600–1800**.

Looking at this graph, there are several key trends that are borne out in history by the sources below:

1. Dutch peak during the Dutch Golden Age ~(1620–1670)

During the Golden Age, and particularly the Anglo-Dutch Wars, the Dutch fleet rivaled or slightly exceeded the English fleet.

- The Dutch fleet reaches about 120 warships, during the height of the **Anglo-Dutch Wars**.
- This corresponds with producing and being able to produce great admirals like Michiel de Ruyter, and having the capacity to produce a fleet that can win major naval battles.

Example: at battles like the Four Days' Battle (1666) both sides fielded over 100 ships and roughly 8,000 guns.

The Dutch advantage came from:

- enormous merchant fleet that bread experienced sailors and technical maritime knowledge
- maritime trade wealth, the surplus of which could be taxed and invested in the navy.
- the enormous financial power that came with being the financial center of the world economy, especially the Amsterdam Bourse and the Bank of Amsterdam. This allowed the funding of the navy and spreading the risk over many financial instruments used to raise the capital.

One technical disadvantage was that Dutch ships tended to be smaller and more maneuverable due to shallow coastal waters of the northern Netherlands. Even the bigger Dutch warships had shallower drafts due to this which made them less stable gun platforms than the English ships of the period. Ironically, this did allow the Dutch ships to hide in shallower waters where the English ships could not follow.

2. Inflection point (~1670–1700)

- After the Glorious Revolution (1688), England and the Dutch Republic become allies against France, and Dutch naval investment slows.
- The Dutch concentrated on their land frontier with their Army under William III to defend against the invading French armies of Louis XIV. This imposed a heavy burden on the Dutch State (see Economic history of the Netherlands (1500–1815)), leaving less money for the Navy. Hence the linear/geometric decline in the number of Dutch warships vs. the English.

Britain began to outbuild everyone, due to several key financial and strategic advantages:

- a unified/centralized Admiralty administration (as oppossed to the Dutch de-centralized) broadly supported by the Parliamentary power structure
- permanent taxation for navy funding funded by Parliament and
- the Financial Revolution, a set of economic and financial reforms in Great Britain after the Glorious Revolution in 1688 when William III invaded England. Ironically, the reforms were based in part on Dutch economic and financial innovations that were brought to England by William III.
- the lack of a land border with any of the major power players in Europe, which isolated England from having to maintain a large portion of an army to ward off the threat of invasion. The land border with France and Spain became for the Dutch Republic a serious constraint in that it needed to fund and maintain a large standing army and a chain of barrier fortresses.

3. British naval dominance (1714–1800)

- The Royal Navy grew dramatically.
- The Dutch, even after defeating the French in the War of the Spanish Succession, need to continue concentrating on defending their land frontier, and so spend less on their Navy in relation to England/Great Britain.
- By 1800, Britain has roughly 330 warships vs ~45 Dutch ships**, reflecting Britain’s global empire and wartime mobilization against Napoleon Bonaparte.
- By 1750–1800, Britain possessed: 3–5× the number of ships of the next 2 largest battle fleets in the world combined (France and Spain), in order to combat any confluence of rival fleets.. This is an advantage the Royal Navy would seek to maintain for the next 100 years through the end of World War I.
- global logistics system of worldwide bases covering strategic sea route choke points. The Netherlands had a global empire, but lost control of several choke points, e.g. the Cape in South Africa, to Britain.

Strategic takeaway

- 1650–1675: Naval parity (Dutch Golden Age)
- 1680–1750: Britain gradually pulls ahead, due to Dutch need to concentrate on defending their land borders.
- 1750–1800: Britain becomes the dominant naval power in the world by a factor of 3-5.

In the charts below:

- Figures represent approximate numbers of active warships and naval personnel.
- Totals include ships of the line and major rated warships; smaller craft such as fireships, tenders, and auxiliaries are generally excluded.
- Numbers fluctuate significantly during wartime, particularly during the Anglo-Dutch Wars and later conflicts with France.
- Dutch naval forces were divided among five regional admiralties, while the English and later British navy was centrally administered by the Admiralty.

Typical 74-gun ships of the line carried 500–700 crew and became the backbone of fleets.

Typical Ship Comparison (mid-17th century) Type Guns Crew Dutch ship-of-the-line 60–80 350–450 English ship-of-the-line 70–100 450–650

Examples:

- Dutch flagship 80-gun ships like De Zeven Provinciën (1665).
- English 80-gun first rates such as Royal Charles (1660).

Estimated strength of the Dutch Republic Navy and the English/British Royal Navy, 1600–1800,,,,,
Year	Dutch warships	Dutch guns	Dutch personnel	English/British warships	English/British guns	English/British personnel
1600	40	1,600	8,000	34	1,400	7,000
1610	45	1,900	9,000	38	1,600	8,000
1620	50	2,100	10,000	42	1,800	9,000
1630	60	2,700	12,000	45	2,000	10,000
1640	70	3,200	14,000	55	2,600	12,000
1650	90	4,200	18,000	80	4,000	20,000
1660	120	6,500	30,000	110	6,800	35,000
1670	110	6,300	28,000	120	7,500	40,000
1680	100	6,000	26,000	140	8,800	45,000
1690	90	5,600	24,000	160	10,000	50,000
1700	80	5,200	22,000	170	11,000	55,000
1710	75	4,800	20,000	180	12,000	60,000
1720	70	4,600	18,000	150	10,500	50,000
1730	65	4,300	17,000	160	11,500	55,000
1740	70	4,700	18,000	180	13,000	65,000
1750	65	4,400	17,000	200	15,000	75,000
1760	60	4,200	16,000	230	18,000	85,000
1770	55	4,000	15,000	250	20,000	95,000
1780	60	4,300	17,000	270	22,000	100,000
1790	50	3,700	14,000	300	25,000	120,000
1800	45	3,400	13,000	330	27,000	130,000

Below is a table expanded to include the French Navy and Spanish Navy along with the Dutch Republic Navy and the English/British Royal Navy. Values represent approximate active major warships (ships of the line and rated warships), estimated total guns carried, and naval personnel at 10-year intervals from 1600–1800.

Estimated strength of major European navies, 1600–1800.,,,,,
Year	Dutch warships	Dutch guns	Dutch personnel	English/British warships	English/British guns	English/British personnel	French warships	French guns	French personnel	Spanish warships	Spanish guns	Spanish personnel
1600	40	1600	8000	34	1400	7000	25	1100	6000	45	1900	9000
1610	45	1900	9000	38	1600	8000	30	1300	7000	50	2100	10000
1620	50	2100	10000	42	1800	9000	35	1600	8000	55	2400	11000
1630	60	2700	12000	45	2000	10000	40	1900	9000	60	2700	12000
1640	70	3200	14000	55	2600	12000	45	2200	10000	65	3000	13000
1650	90	4200	18000	80	4000	20000	50	2600	12000	60	2900	12500
1660	120	6500	30000	110	6800	35000	70	4200	22000	55	2800	12000
1670	110	6300	28000	120	7500	40000	120	8500	45000	50	2600	11000
1680	100	6000	26000	140	8800	45000	160	11500	65000	45	2400	10000
1690	90	5600	24000	160	10000	50000	170	12500	70000	40	2200	9000
1700	80	5200	22000	170	11000	55000	150	11000	60000	35	2000	8000
1710	75	4800	20000	180	12000	60000	140	10500	55000	30	1800	7000
1720	70	4600	18000	150	10500	50000	110	8500	45000	30	1800	7000
1730	65	4300	17000	160	11500	55000	120	9200	48000	35	2000	8000
1740	70	4700	18000	180	13000	65000	140	11000	55000	40	2400	9000
1750	65	4400	17000	200	15000	75000	160	13000	65000	45	2700	10000
1760	60	4200	16000	230	18000	85000	170	14000	70000	50	3000	11000
1770	55	4000	15000	250	20000	95000	180	15500	75000	55	3300	12000
1780	60	4300	17000	270	22000	100000	200	18000	85000	60	3800	14000
1790	50	3700	14000	300	25000	120000	190	17500	80000	70	4500	16000
1800	45	3400	13000	330	27000	130000	180	16500	75000	75	5000	18000

Below is a second table showing only ships of the line (the core battle fleet) for the four major naval powers from 1650–1800. This is the comparison historians most often use when discussing naval power in the Age of Sail.

These are approximate active ships-of-the-line, counted at 10-year intervals, reflecting ships fit for battle rather than vessels under construction or laid up.

Estimated number of ships of the line in major European navies, 1650–1800,,,,,
Year	English / British Royal Navy	French Navy	Spanish Navy	Dutch Republic Navy
1650	40	20	30	35
1660	50	30	28	45
1670	60	70	25	50
1680	75	90	22	40
1690	90	100	20	35
1700	100	90	18	30
1710	105	80	15	28
1720	95	65	15	25
1730	100	70	18	22
1740	110	80	22	25
1750	120	90	25	20
1760	140	95	30	18
1770	150	105	40	15
1780	165	120	50	18
1790	190	110	65	12
1800	200	95	75	10

== Seventeenth century ==
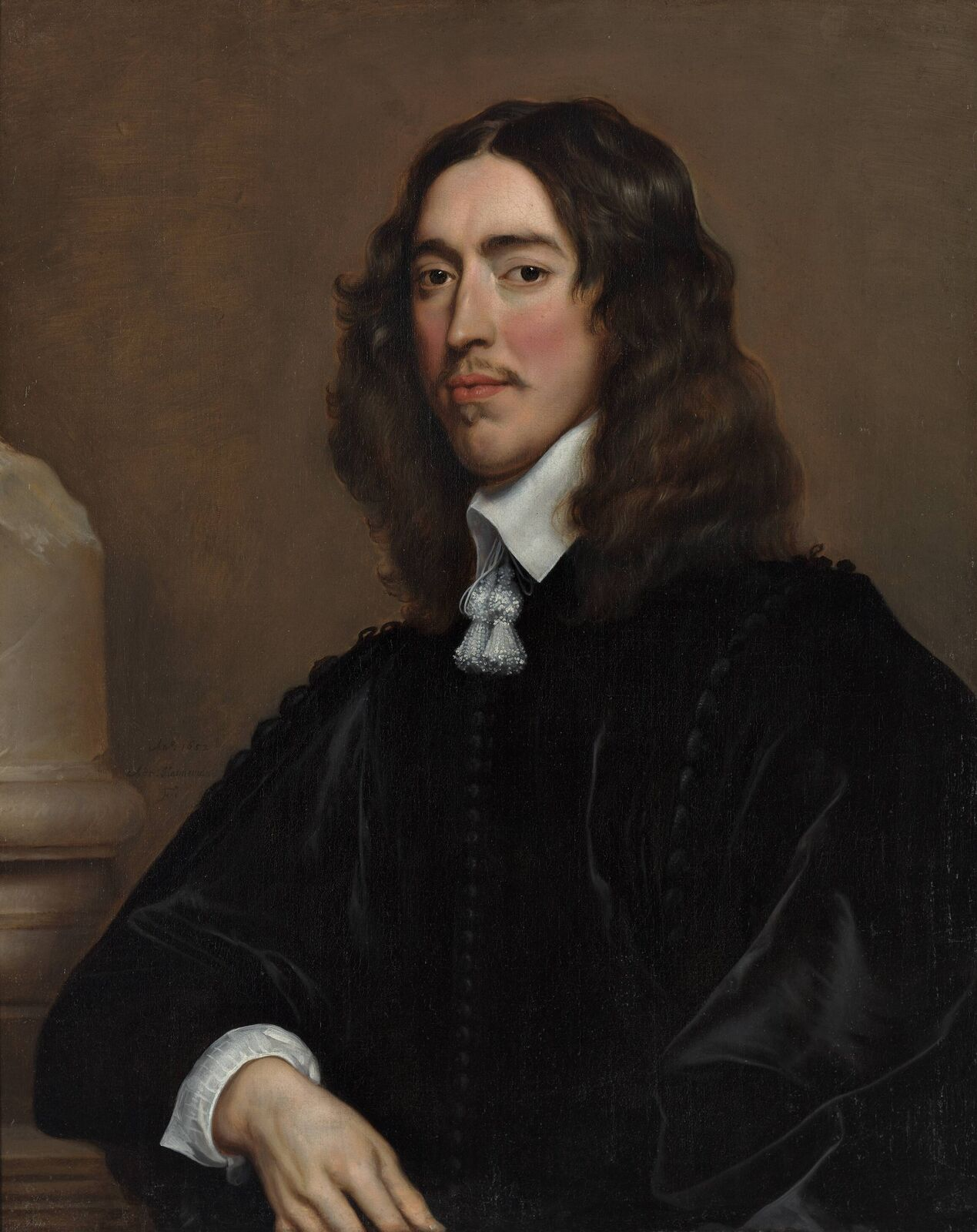
Johan de Witt, Portrait by Adriaen Hanneman, 1652

In the early 17th century, the States fleet was reinforced with armed merchant ships, reflecting the Republic’s reliance on commercial resources for naval warfare. The introduction of line tactics made agility, uniform sailing capacity, speed, and standardization of vessels increasingly important. In 1653, the States-General, on the initiative of Johan de Witt, ordered the construction of sixty ships, built for the war with England.

D Witt, the councilor pensionary of Holland and leading statesman of the Republic, coordinated closely with Michiel de Ruyter, who commanded the fleet on behalf of the States-General, and the Amsterdam merchant and member of the Admiralty College David Wildt, who was responsible for financing the construction.

In the 1660s, a second series of sixty ships was commissioned, forming a large standing war fleet of roughly one hundred vessels, including ships of the line, frigates, and lighter vessels. The largest ships, such as the , including the flagship Seven Provinces (De Zeven Provinciën ), were equipped with 80 to 96 guns.

The navy typically maintained about three to four thousand seamen in peacetime, but when war threatened, thousands more sailors were mustered for single campaigns. Recruitment was overseen by flag officers and captains, while a small number of experienced permanent officers—known as extraordinary captains—were salaried and responsible for victualing the fleet. Each ship’s captain purchased supplies from the extraordinary captains at a subsidized discount provided by the Admiralties. The income amounted to the main income of the extradordinary captains..

The sailors were drawn largely from the proletariat and the multinational populations of the Dutch port cities. In 1665, a regiment of soldiers aboard the ships was instituted under Baron Willem Joseph van Ghent, forming the nucleus of what would later become the Netherlands Marine Corps.

=== Strategic Mission ===
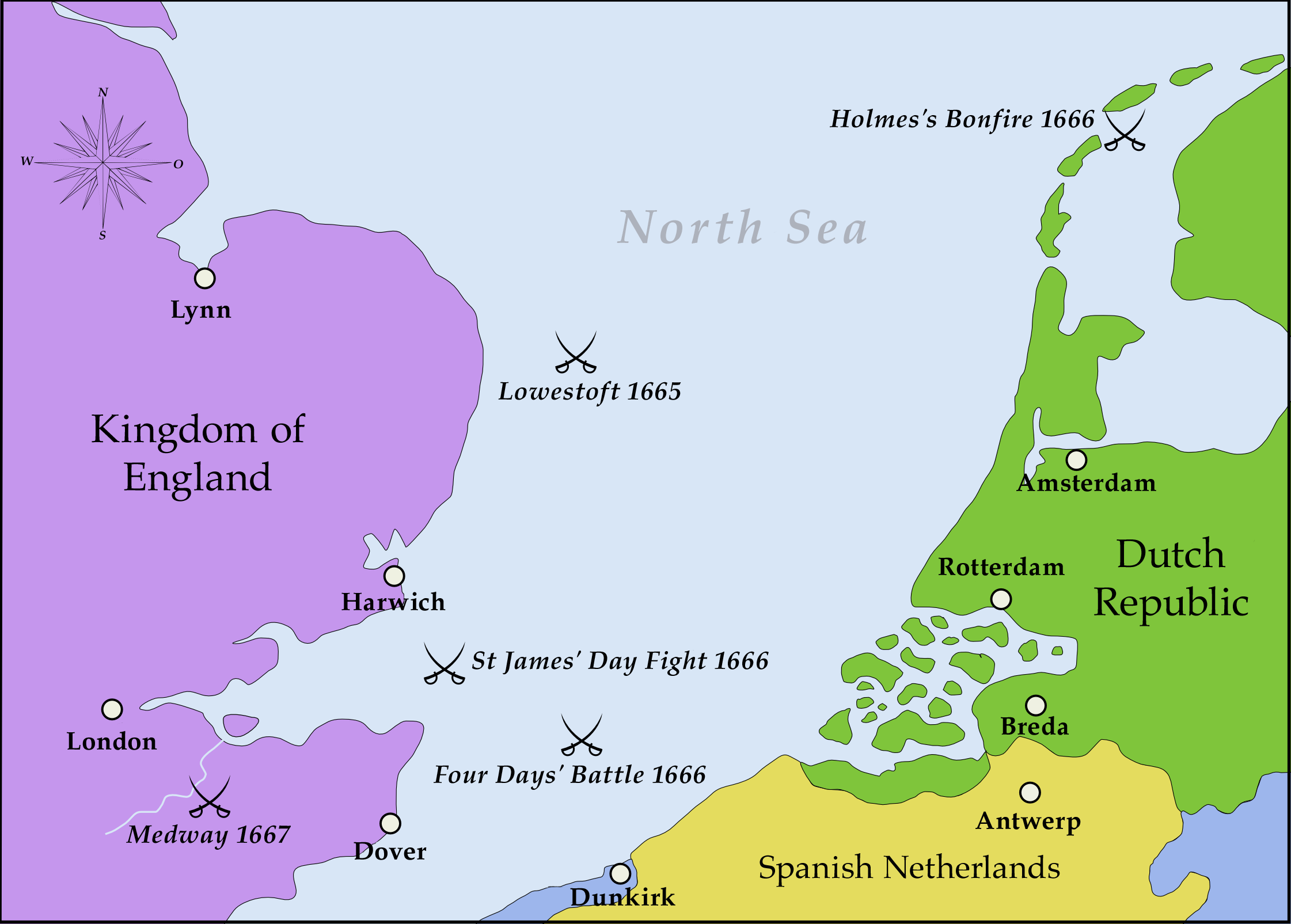
Main battle sites of the Second Anglo-Dutch War: as in the other Anglo-Dutch Wars, apart from Bergen, most fighting took place in the southern North Sea astride the trade routes in and out of the Dutch Republic.

During the 17th century, the Dutch Republic was involved in numerous naval operations, primarily aimed at keeping trade routes open and defending its territory.

Until 1648, Spain remained the main adversary. In 1607, a States fleet destroyed the entire Spanish fleet at the Battle of Gibraltar, significantly weakening Spanish naval power. Partly as a result of this defeat, peace negotiations launched in 1609 led to the Twelve Years' Truce.

The Battle of the Downs in 1639, in which Lieutenant-Admiral Maarten Tromp and Vice-Admiral Witte de With defeated a Spanish armada of 55 ships (the Second Spanish Armada), effectively ended Spanish maritime dominance.

In addition to combat operations, the fleet regularly blockaded the Flemish coast and escorted merchant convoys to the Baltic Sea. Close relations between the Dutch and Swedes angered the Danes, as many Dutch merchants had settled in Sweden and controlled significant portions of trade and industry. One prominent figure was Louis de Geer. In 1644, the Dutch provided Sweden with 23 ships, fully manned, to assist in the occupation of Fehmarn. In response, Denmark had banned the export of timber from Norway in 1640, prompting a Dutch-Swedish campaign against the Danes to protect access to the Baltic. Witte de With commanded the Brederode with a large convoy, successfully navigating the Sound in 1644–1645 and forcing a favorable toll agreement for Dutch merchants.

=== Anglo-Dutch Wars ===
See: First Anglo-Dutch War, Second Anglo-Dutch War, Third Anglo-Dutch War, Glorious Revolution, Fourth Anglo-Dutch War

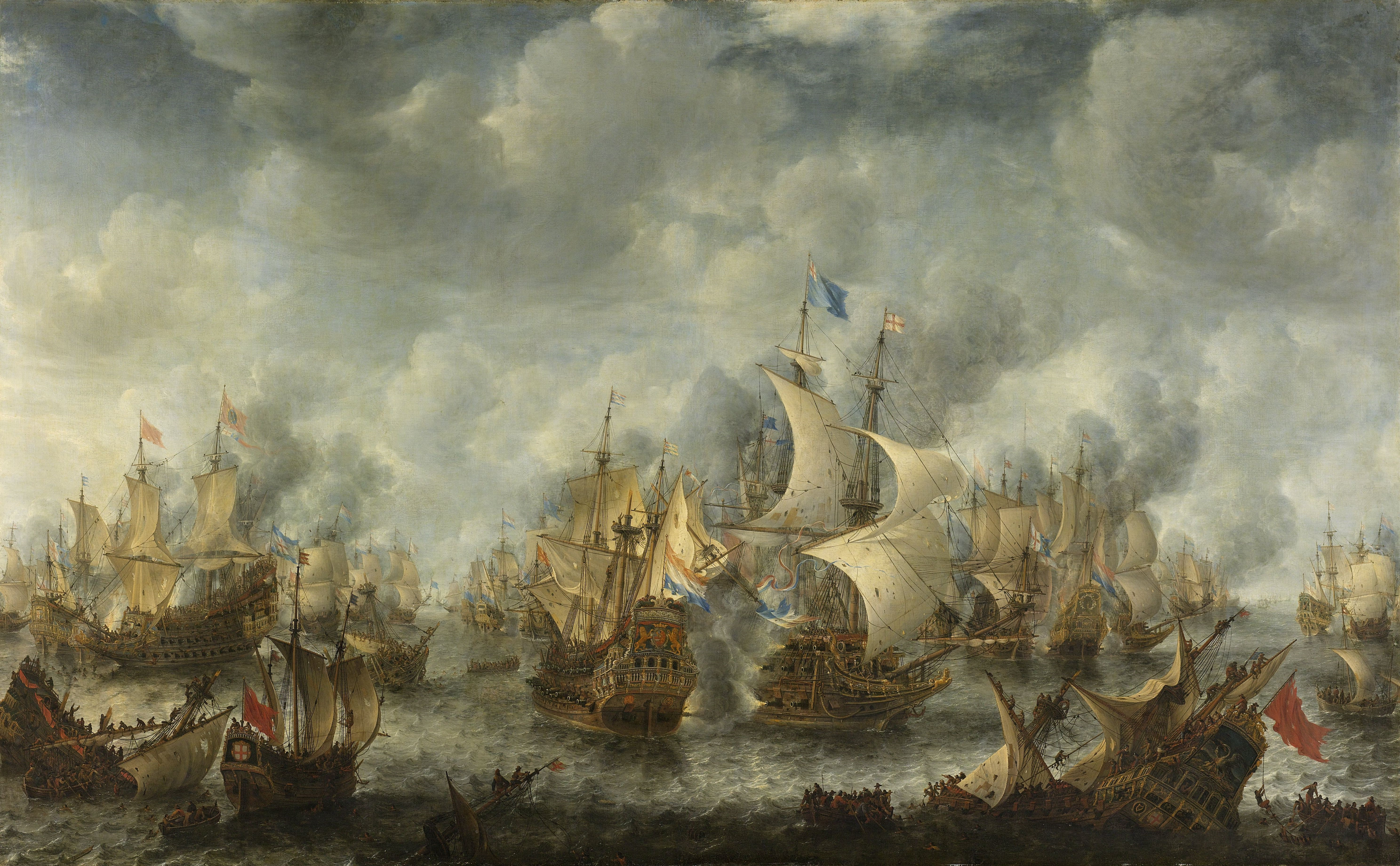
The Battle of Scheveningen, 10 August 1653 by Jan Abrahamsz Beerstraaten, painted c. 1654, depicts the final battle of the First Anglo-Dutch War.

During the 17th century, Dutch maritime expansion led to increased tensions with their European neighbors, in particular the Kingdom of England. This rivalry led to the Anglo-Dutch Wars. During the First Anglo-Dutch War, English fleet operations were aimed primarily at Dutch merchantmen to obstruct free passage. One example was the Battle of Dungeness in December 1652, in which Maarten Tromp managed to keep the Channel open to Dutch shipping. The Battle of Livorno in 1653, under Commander Johan van Galen, saw the Dutch prevail in the Mediterranean Sea, disrupting English trade with the Levant. In the Second Anglo-Dutch War, five major naval actions took place, almost all off the English coast. In 1667, the Dutch under Michiel de Ruyter undertook a Raid on the Medway.

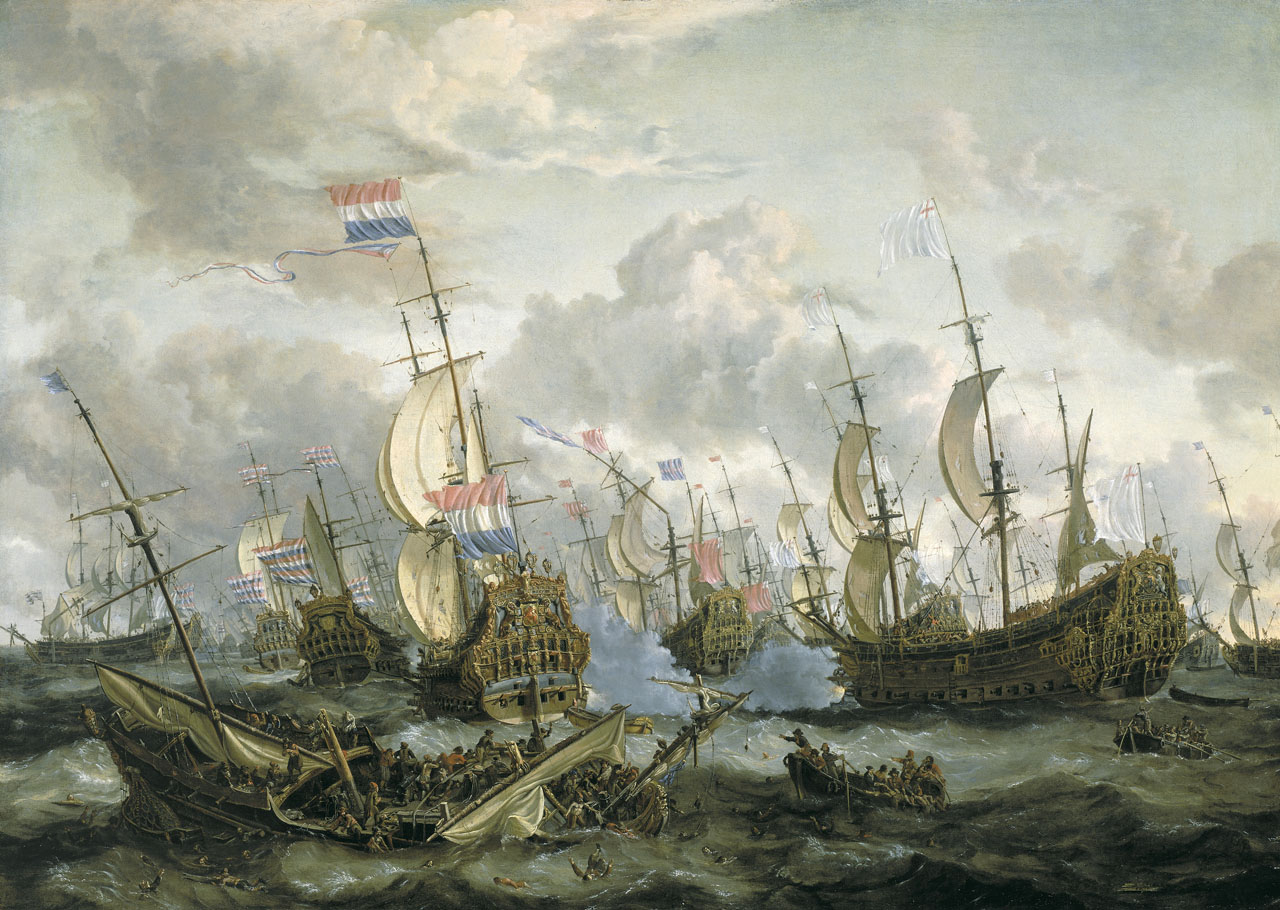
The Royal Prince and other vessels at the Four Days Fight, 11–14 June 1666 (Abraham Storck) depicts a battle of the Second Anglo-Dutch War. In the foreground the Swiftsure with Admiral Berkeley surrenders. On the right the grounded Prince Royal with Admiral George Ayscue surrenders by releasing white smoke; De Ruyter on the De Zeven Provinciën accepts. In between the Royal Charles can just be seen with a broken mast.

The Third Anglo-Dutch War was part of the Franco-Dutch War. In 1674, England, France, Cologne and Münster declared war on the Dutch Republic. Facing large Anglo-French numerical superiority at sea, the Dutch fleet was soon on the defensive. De Ruyter, however, held the enemy off from the Dutch coast. The conclusion of the Treaty of Westminster brought an end to the trade wars between the rival navies. After Stadtholder William III of Orange-Nassau was proclaimed king of England in the Glorious Revolution, the Dutch and English fought as allies against France in the Nine Years' War and War of the Spanish Succession. Naval operations shifted from the North Sea and the English Channel to the French coast and the Mediterranean, where the Dutch fleet sailed against the squadrons of Louis XIV and the Barbary pirates.

== Downturn ==
In the 18th century, the States fleet had declined significantly and could no longer compete effectively with the naval powers of Great Britain and France. Efforts to modernize and expand the fleet were undertaken, particularly during the 1780s, but these programs proved insufficient to restore Dutch maritime supremacy. The ambitious shipbuilding program of the early 1780s coincided with the outbreak of the Fourth Anglo-Dutch War (1780–1784), which revealed the limitations of the fleet in both numbers and training.

During the war, the Dutch fleet engaged the British at the Battle of Dogger Bank (1781), under the command of Admiral Johan Zoutman. The battle ended in a tactical draw, but strategically it was a defeat for the Dutch: the fleet failed to break the British blockade, and the Dutch merchant fleet continued to suffer severe losses from British naval dominance.

The Republic’s financial position further constrained its naval capacity. Unlike in the 17th century, when the Dutch could leverage a sophisticated banking and credit system to fund large fleets, by the 1780s the Republic faced substantial debts and economic strain. In addition, commitments on land against France required large allocations of resources to the States Army, leaving little funding available for the navy. This combination of economic and strategic pressures meant that the Dutch Republic was no longer positioned to maintain a fleet capable of challenging Britain at sea.

The Paris Peace Treaty formalized the Dutch position at the end of the war, granting Britain freedom of navigation in the East Indies. This outcome highlighted the shift in global maritime power: Britain’s mastery of the seas now constrained Dutch access to the lucrative trade of the Dutch East Indies. Despite the presence of the Dutch East India Company (VOC), the Dutch Republic lacked the naval capacity to protect its overseas possessions or challenge British commercial interests.

The Fourth Anglo-Dutch War marked the nadir of the Dutch fleet’s strategic significance. Economic constraints, internal political disputes between the provinces, and outdated shipbuilding practices prevented any rapid recovery. By the late 18th century, the Dutch navy existed largely as a coastal defense force, unable to project power beyond European waters. This decline presaged the absorption of Dutch naval assets into the Batavian Republic after the French Revolutionary Wars, ending the era of independent Dutch maritime influence.

== The French and After ==
Under the Batavian Republic (1795–1806), the decentralized system of five provincial admiralties that had governed the Dutch Navy since the 16th century was abolished. These were replaced by a single, centralized naval administration intended to streamline command, standardize training and shipbuilding, and improve fiscal oversight. The centralization reflected both the influence of French Revolutionary reforms and the strategic necessity of maintaining a unified naval force under the politically unstable Republic.

During the Napoleonic era, the Batavian fleet suffered heavy losses and saw many of its ships requisitioned or captured by France and Britain, leaving the naval forces in a weakened state by the time of Dutch independence in 1813. Following the establishment of the Kingdom of the Netherlands in 1815, King William I undertook a program to reconstitute a professional national navy. The focus was on building a smaller but more modern and centrally organized force capable of protecting Dutch commerce, the colonies, and coastal waters.

The Royal Netherlands Navy (Koninklijke Marine) was formally established during this period, consolidating the legacy of the former admiralty colleges into a unified service. From 1905 onward, the navy was officially designated as the Royal Netherlands Navy, reflecting the professionalization, modernization, and ceremonial recognition of its historical continuity. The reforms included the introduction of standardized officer ranks, centralized training at the naval academy in Den Helder, and modernized shipbuilding programs to meet the challenges of a changing European naval balance of power.

Dutch naval priorities in the 19th century were heavily influenced by colonial commitments, particularly in the Dutch East Indies. A significant portion of the fleet was allocated to protect trade routes, maintain garrisons, and enforce Dutch authority overseas. These obligations shaped ship design, operational doctrine, and the allocation of budgetary resources, ensuring that the navy remained a global instrument of commerce and colonial administration, even as its European role was limited by the predominance of the British Royal Navy.

== Sources ==
- Asaert, G.; Bosscher, Ph.M.; Bruijn, J.R.; Hoboken, W.J. (1976–1978). Maritieme geschiedenis der Nederlanden (in Dutch). Bussum: De Boer Maritiem.
- Bas, François de (1887). Prins Frederik der Nederlanden en zijn tijd (in Dutch). Vol. 1. Schiedam: H. A. M. Roelants.
- Black, Jeremy (2009). Naval Power: A History of Warfare and the Sea from 1500. Palgrave Macmillan. ISBN 978-0230524187.
- Blake, Nicholas; Lawrence, Richard (2002). The Illustrated Companion to Nelson's Navy. Mechanicsburg, PA: Stackpole Books.
- Blok, Petrus Johannes (1898). History of the People of the Netherlands. New York: G. P. Putnam's Sons.
- Boxer, Charles Ralph (1974). The Anglo-Dutch Wars of the Seventeenth Century. London: Her Majesty's Stationery Office.
- Bruijn, Jaap R. (1993). The Dutch Navy of the Seventeenth and Eighteenth Centuries. University of South Carolina Press.
- Defensie, Ministerie van (2019-09-16). "Geschiedenis marine - Koninklijke Marine". Defensie.nl (in Dutch).
- de la Court, Peter (1746) [1662]. Memoirs of Cornelius de Witt and John de Witt: The True Interest and Political Maxims of the Republic of Holland. London: John Campbell.
- Dull, Jonathan R. (2009). The Age of the Ship of the Line: The British and French Navies, 1650–1815. University of Nebraska Press. ISBN 978-0803219304.
- Fox, Frank L. (2018). The Four Days' Battle of 1666: The Greatest Sea Fight of the Age of Sail. Barnsley: Seaforth Publishing. ISBN 978-1526732927.
- Geyl, Pieter (1970). Orange and Stuart, 1641–1672. Scribner.
- Glete, Jan (1993). Navies and Nations: Warships, Navies and State Building in Europe and America, 1500–1860. Almqvist & Wiksell International. ISBN 978-9122015659.
- Glete, Jan (2002). War and the State in Early Modern Europe: Spain, the Dutch Republic and Sweden as Fiscal-Military States, 1500–1660. New York: Routledge. ISBN 978-9122015659.
- Israel, Jonathan I. (1995). The Dutch Republic: Its Rise, Greatness, and Fall, 1477–1806. Oxford University Press. ISBN 0-19-820734-4.
- Lavery, Brian (1983). The Ship of the Line: The Development of the Battlefleet 1650–1850. Conway Maritime Press.
- Mahan, Alfred Thayer (1980). The Influence of Sea Power upon History 1660–1812. Greenwich, CT: Bison Books.
- Nimwegen, Olaf van (2006). "Deser landen crijchsvolck": Het Staatse leger en de militaire revoluties (1588–1688) (in Dutch). Amsterdam: Bert Bakker. ISBN 90-351-2941-5.
- Roberts, Keith (2010). Pike and Shot Tactics, 1590–1660. Botley: Osprey Publishing. ISBN 978-1-84603-469-5.
- Rodger, N. A. M. (2004). The Command of the Ocean: A Naval History of Britain, 1649–1815. Penguin. ISBN 0-393-32847-3.
- Rogers, P. G. (1970). The Dutch on the Medway. Oxford: Oxford University Press. ISBN 0-19-215185-1.
- Rowen, Herbert H. (1978). John de Witt, Grand Pensionary of Holland, 1625–1672. Princeton, NJ: Princeton University Press.
- Rowen, Herbert H. (2003a). John de Witt: Statesman of the "True Freedom". Cambridge University Press.
- Rowen, Herbert H. (2003b). The Princes of Orange: The Stadholders in the Dutch Republic. Cambridge University Press.
- Swart, Erik (2006). Krijgsvolk: Militaire professionalisering en het ontstaan van het Staatse leger, 1568–1590 (in Dutch). Amsterdam: Amsterdam University Press. ISBN 978-90-5356-876-7.
- Temple, Sir William (1705). Observations upon the United Provinces of the Netherlands, orig published 1668 (7th ed.). London: Jacob Tonfon within Grays-Inn Gate next Grays-Inn Lane, and Awnfoam and John Churchill at the Black Swan in Tater-No/ler-Row*.
- Tracy, James D. (2008). The Founding of the Dutch Republic: War, Finance, and Politics in Holland, 1572–1588. Oxford: Oxford University Press. ISBN 978-0-19-920911-8.
- Raa, F. J. G. ten; Bas, F. de, eds. (1910–1950). Het staatsche leger, 1568–1795 (in Dutch). Breda: Militaire Academie.
- Zwitzer, H. L. (1991). "De militie van den staat": Het leger van de Republiek der Verenigde Nederlanden (in Dutch). Amsterdam: Van Soeren. ISBN 90-6881-020-0.
