= Dutch ship Rotterdam (1695) =

Ship of the line of the Dutch States Navy

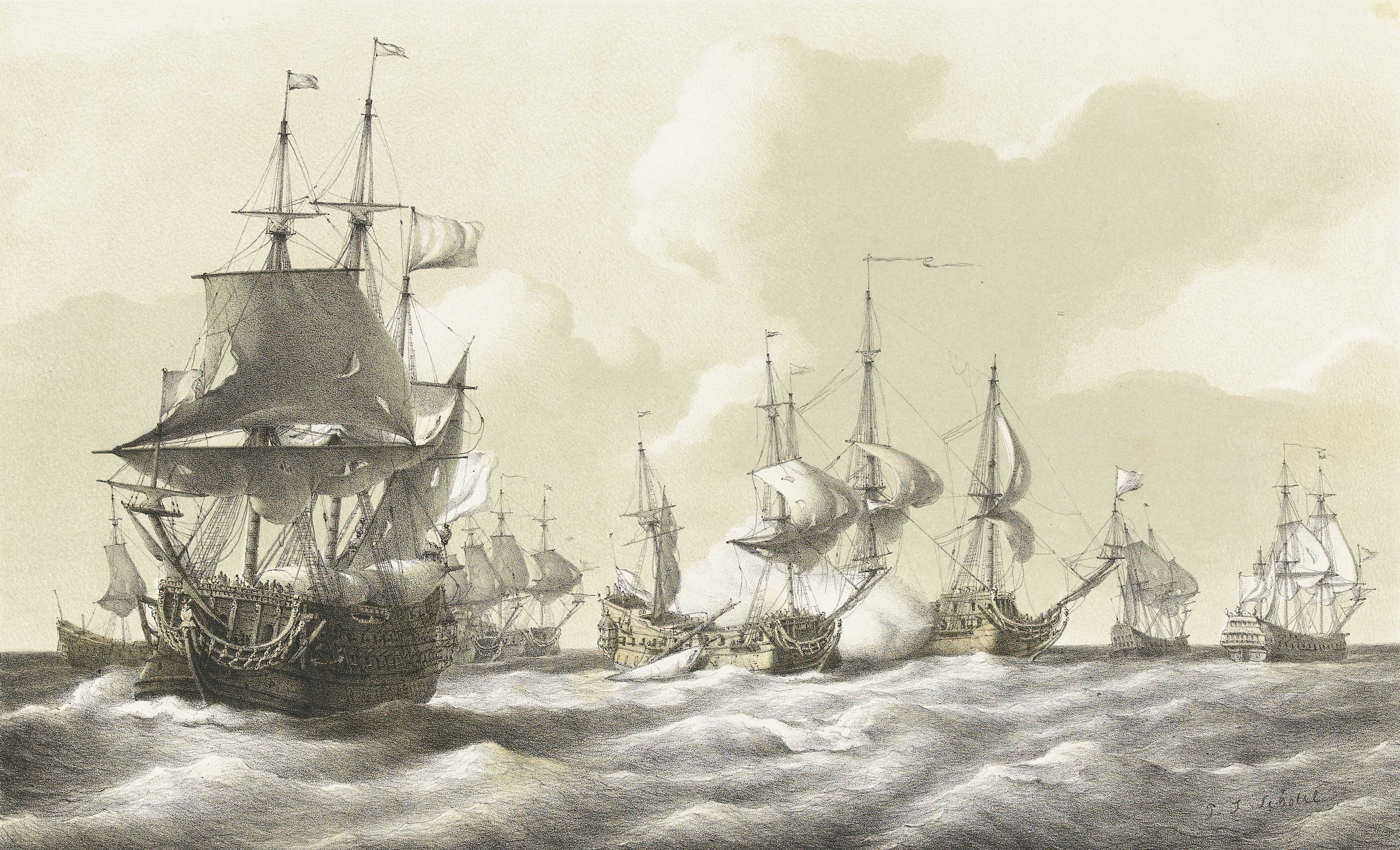
- Rotterdam at the Battle of Cap de la Roque

History

Dutch Republic.
- Name: Rotterdam
- Builder: Rotterdam Naval Yard
- Launched: 1695
- Captured: By the French, 22 May 1703
- Notes: Operated by the Admiralty of Rotterdam

France
- Name: Rotterdam
- Acquired: 22 May 1703
- Decommissioned: 1706
- Notes: Operated by the Marine Royale

General characteristics when built in 1695
- Class & type: fourth rate ship of the line
- Tonnage: 450 tons
- Length: 115 ft 1 in (35.1 m) (gundeck)
- Beam: 31 ft 7 in (9.6 m)
- Depth of hold: 11 ft 6 in (3.5 m)
- Propulsion: Sails
- Sail plan: Full-rigged ship
- Armament: 52 guns

General characteristics after capture in 1703
- Class & type: 40-gun ship of the line
- Length: 114 ft 3 in (34.8 m) (gundeck)
- Beam: 31 ft 6 in (9.6 m)
- Depth of hold: 11 ft 3 in (3.4 m)
- Propulsion: Sails
- Sail plan: Full-rigged ship
- Armament: 40 guns

Rotterdam was a 52-gun ship of the line of the Dutch States Navy, launched in 1695 by the Rotterdam Naval Yard and operated by the Admiralty of Rotterdam until it was captured by the French Navy in 1703. It had a crew of around 110 men.

== Service ==
On 22 May, Rotterdam was escorting a convoy of around 110 English and Dutch merchant ships when they were intercepted by a French squadron under Alain Emmanuel de Coëtlogon. Dutch Captain Roemer Vlacq commanded his ships to turn and fight the French, allowing for the merchant ships to escape, but leading to the capture of all 5 escort ships; Rotterdam was captured by Orgueilleux. Rotterdam was taken by the French to Toulon where she was commissioned into the French Navy as Rotterdam and its armament reduced to 40 guns. She continued to serve in the French Navy until being decommissioned in 1706.
