= Roemer Vlacq =

Roemer Vlacq may refer to:

- Roemer Vlacq (1637–1703), a Dutch naval captain in the 17th century
- Roemer Vlacq (1712–1774), his grandson, a Dutch vice admiral in the 18th century
