= French ship Éole (1693) =

Ship of the line of the French Navy

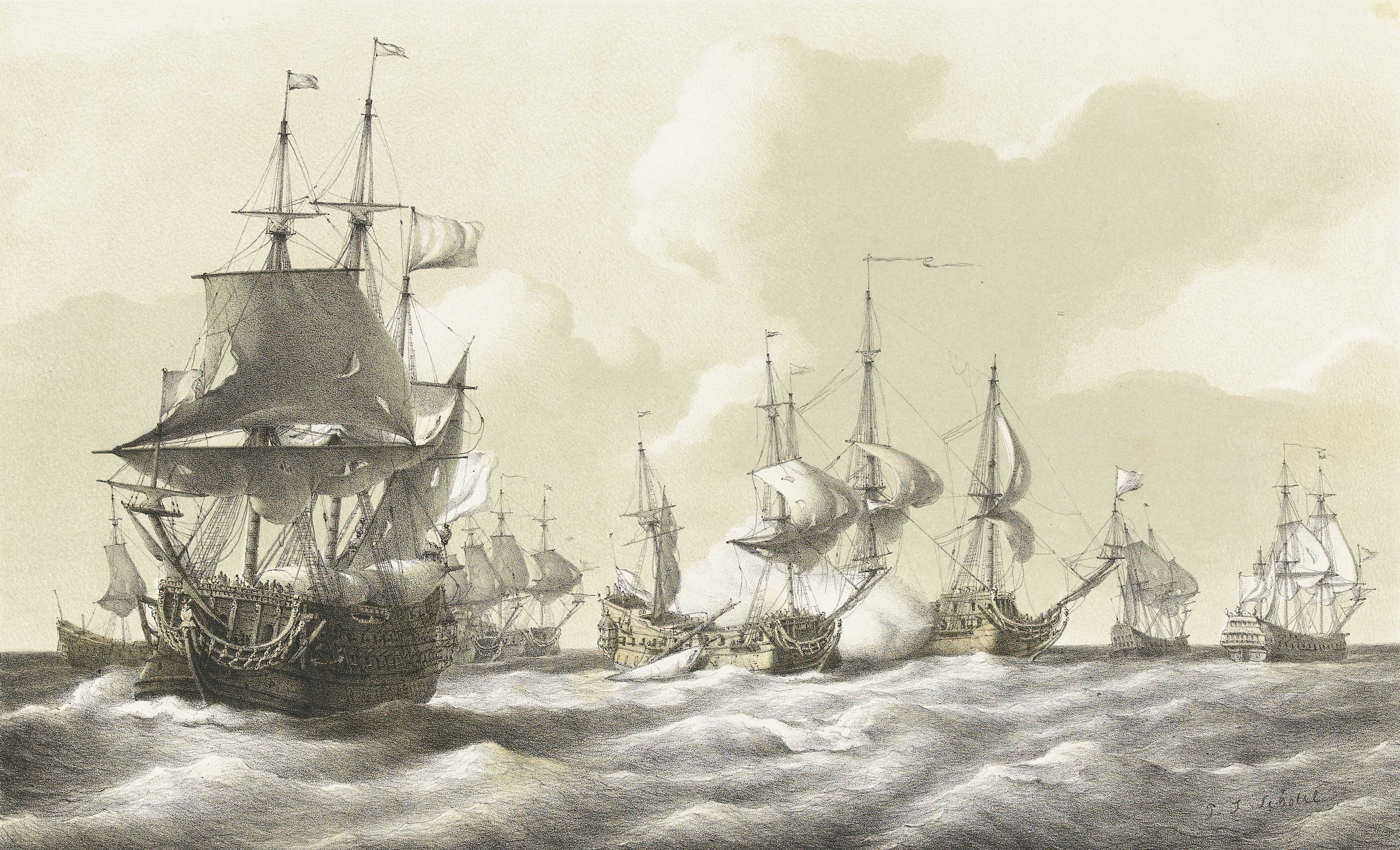
- Éole at the Battle of Cap de la Roque

History

France
- Name: Éole
- Ordered: June 1692
- Builder: Le Havre
- Laid down: July 1692
- Launched: 23 February 1693
- Commissioned: May 1693
- Fate: Sold to be taken to pieces in 1710

General characteristics
- Tonnage: 1,000
- Length: 136 French feet (Note: The French (pre-metric) foot was 6.575% longer than the equivalent English foot.)
- Beam: 37.5 French feet
- Draught: 20 French feet
- Depth of hold: 17 French feet
- Complement: 380 men (300 in peacetime), + 7/9 officers
- Armament: 64 guns

Éole was a 64-gun ship of the line of the French Navy. She was armed with 64 guns, comprising twenty-four 24-pounder guns on the lower deck and twenty-six 12-pounder guns on the upper deck, with eight 6-pounder guns on the quarterdeck and six 6-pounder guns on the forecastle.

Designed by Joseph Andrault, Marquis de Langeron, and built by Pierre Chaillé, she was begun at Le Havre in July 1692 as one of the replacements for the ships destroyed by an Anglo-Dutch attack at action at La Hogue in June 1692. She was launched in February 1693 and completed in May 1693.

Éole, along with her sister ship Saint Louis, took part in the Battle of Málaga on 24 August 1704 and was subsequently scuttled at Toulon in July 1707, but was later raised. She was sold in 1710 to be taken to pieces.
