= Schooneveld =

Coordinates: 51.2560°N 3.120°E

The Schooneveld, also spelled Schoneveld, is a former island turned shoal and namesake adjacent basin at the mouth of the Scheldt river, near the island of Walcheren, off the coast of the Netherlands. The shoal is also referred to as the Droogte van Schooneveld (the dry area of Schooneveld). The basin runs parallel to the continental coast, narrowing from the southwest to the northeast, bounded by the irregular, shifting and very dangerous Raan shoal in the south (located in the mouth of the Westerschelde estuary) and the elongated Thorntonbank in the north.

During the Third Anglo-Dutch War two Battles of Schooneveld were fought in June 1673, though only the first of these really took place in the Schooneveld itself. The name means "clear field" in Dutch.
