= Adriaen Banckert =

Dutch admiral

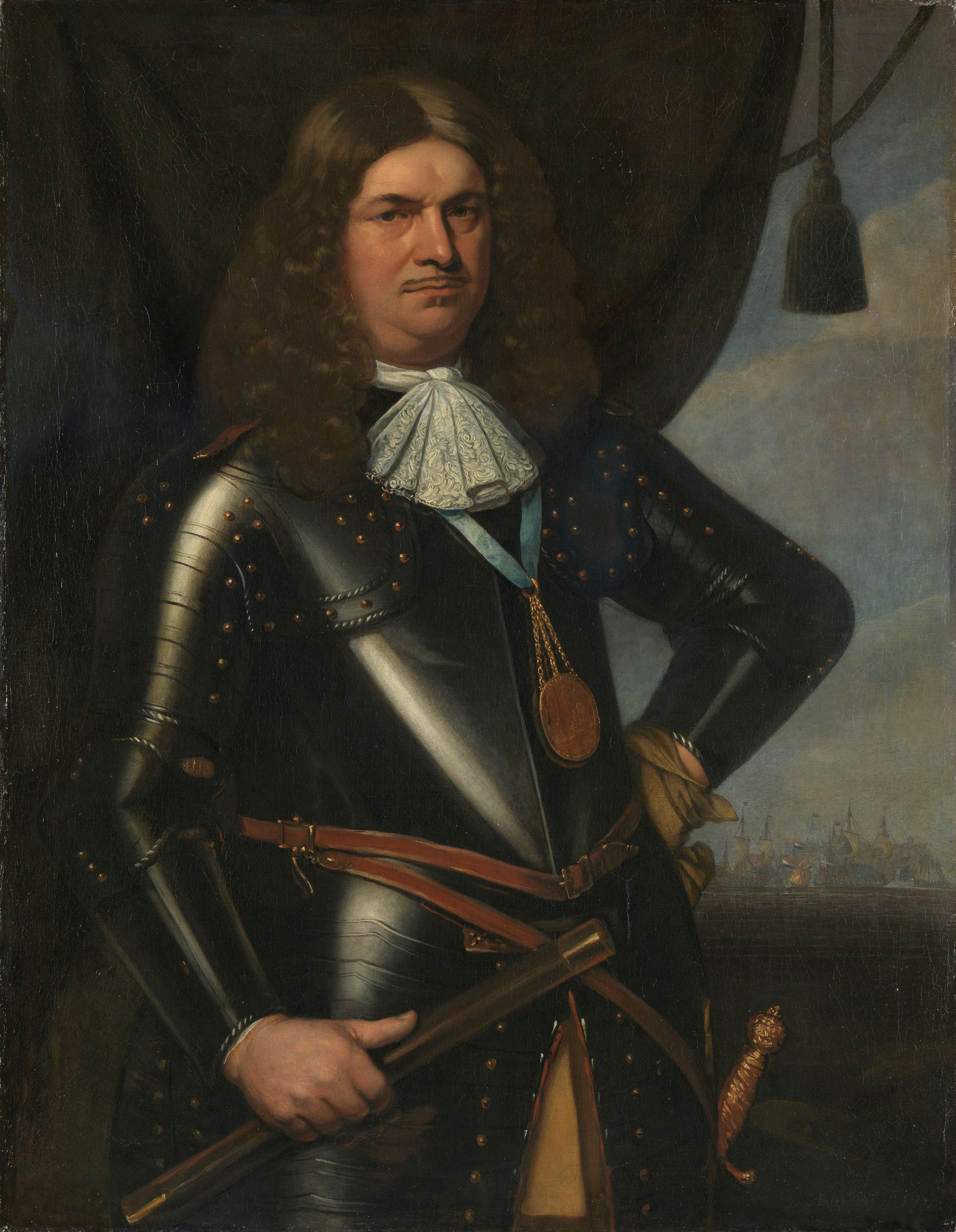
Adriaen Banckert

Adriaen van Trappen Banckert (c.1615 – 22 April 1684) was a Dutch admiral. In English literature he is sometimes known as Banckers. His first name is often rendered in the modern spelling Adriaan. Van Trappen was the original family name, but the family was also and better known under the name of Banckert. In the 17th century Netherlands such a situation was solved by combining the two names.

== Biography ==
He was born, probably in Vlissingen or Flushing, somewhere between 1615 and 1620 as the second and middle son of Rear-Admiral Joost van Trappen Banckert and Adriana Jansen. Both his brothers were navy captains, serving the Admiralty of Zealand also.

Adriaen started his career on the ship of his father, fighting the Dunkirkers. In 1639, at the Battle of the Downs, Adriaen was master on that ship. In 1642 he became a captain himself.

During the First Anglo-Dutch War Adriaen was flagcaptain of the Zealandic Vice-Admiral Johan Evertsen on the Hollandia. In the Battle of Portland in 1653 his elder brother Joost was killed; he himself was taken prisoner the same year when his ship foundered during the Battle of Scheveningen.

During the Northern Wars he fought in 1658 against the Swedish fleet in the Battle of the Sound as captain of the Seeridder and subcommander of the squadron of Vice-Admiral Witte de With. Though the battle was a Dutch victory, Adriaen because of adverse currents failed to assist De With when the Brederode was grounded and surrounded. De With was fatally wounded. During the winter campaign of 1659, the Seeridder lost all her anchors by a storm, grounded and then was frozen solid near Hven. The Swedish army tried to exploit this situation by sending a company of soldiers over the ice to destroy the ship, but Banckert beat off all attacks for three days, until he could work his ship free. Banckert was granted a special audience by Frederick III of Denmark who personally thanked him for the courage shown. The Admiralty of Zealand honoured him with a golden chain worth a hundred golden dollars.

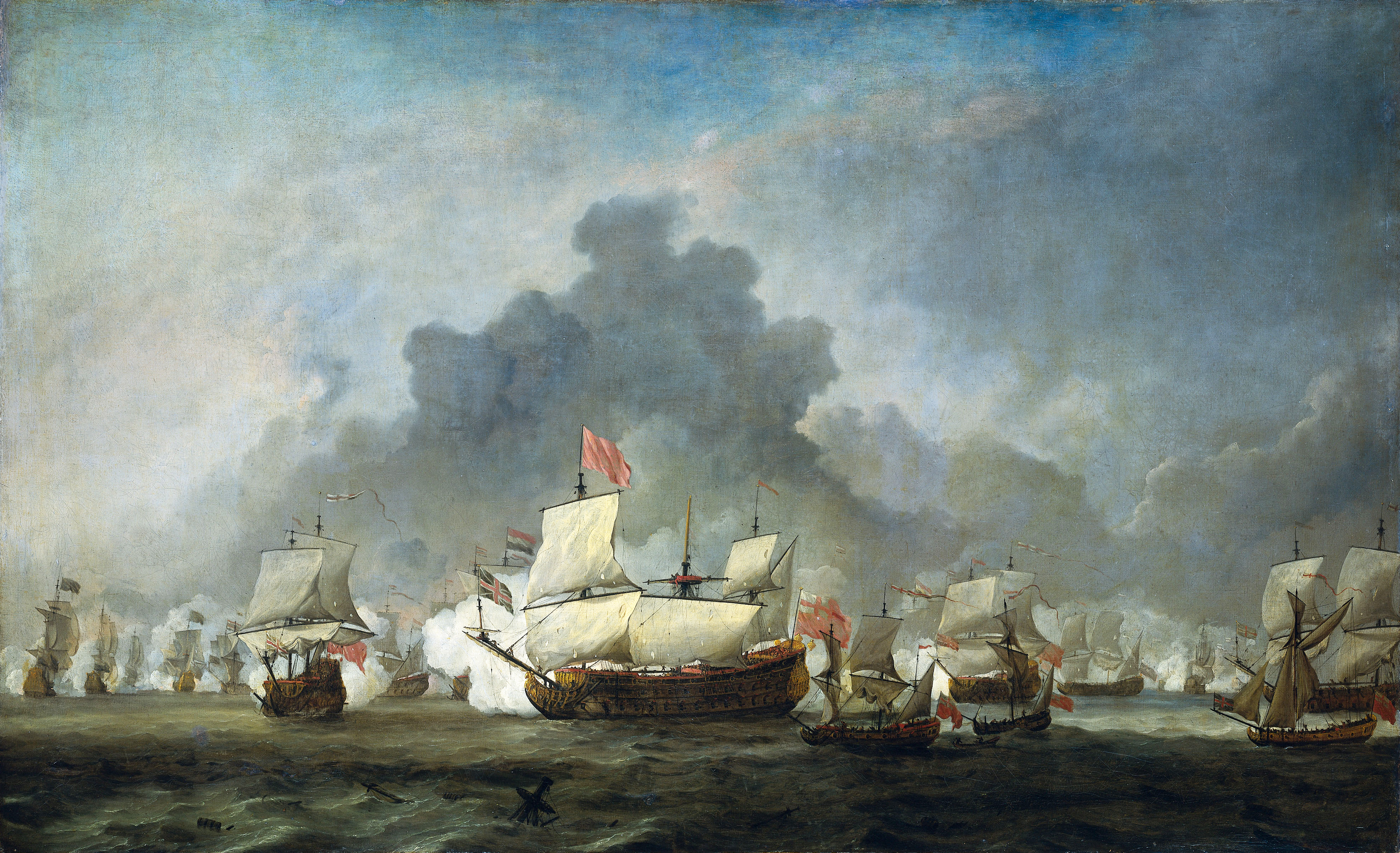
Battle of Solebay

When in 1664 the Second Anglo-Dutch War threatened, the five Dutch admiralties appointed many new flag officers. Banckert was made Rear-Admiral of the Zealandic admiralty on 16 December 1664 and soon after temporary Vice-Admiral. After the Battle of Lowestoft in which his younger brother Johan was killed, he was appointed Vice-Admiral on 15 July 1665. In 1666 he participated in the Four Days Battle; in the St James' Day Battle his ship the Thoolen sank and he was forced to move his flag to the Ter Veere. He managed to cover the retreat of the Dutch fleet on the second day of the battle. In that fight Zealandic Lieutenant-Admiral Johan Evertsen was killed and Banckert was appointed as Lieutenant-Admiral of Zealand on 5 September 1666, and thus held the highest navy rank of that province. In 1667 because of recruiting problems, Banckert was too late with his squadron to participate in the actual Raid on the Medway.

In the four naval battles of the Third Anglo-Dutch War Banckert played an important role, especially by fighting the French squadron within the combined Anglo-French fleet. At the Battle of Solebay Banckert managed to lure away the French fleet allowing the main Dutch force under Lieutenant-Admiral Michiel de Ruyter to attack the English fleet with some parity. In the first action of the double Battle of Schooneveld the French fleet broke formation to attack Banckert's squadron, which allowed Lieutenant-Admiral-General De Ruyter to split the French squadron and outmanoeuvre the allies. In the second action Banckert's attack drove the French away. In the Battle of Texel Banckert managed to prevent a joining of the French and English fleet, again allowing De Ruyter to fight the English with more equal forces. Because of the crucial part he played in these battles Banckert's fame among the French and English was assured; ironically in The Netherlands his importance wasn't understood by the larger part of the population, also because most writers were Hollandic and felt little inclination to honour a Zealandic hero.

In 1674, he joined with Hollandic Lieutenant-Admirals Cornelis Tromp and Aert Jansse van Nes in the expedition against the French coast, in which the island of Noirmoutier was taken and devastated. When Tromp took his squadron to join the Spanish, the command of the remainder of the Dutch fleet was given to Van Nes, although Banckert had seniority. Banckert didn't show his discontent with this situation to his friend Van Nes, but did express his offended feelings in a letter to the Zealandic admiralty. They shared his opinion and decided never again to send out their Lieutenant-Admiral in a confederate expedition, to make sure he wouldn't be humiliated by the Hollanders. This way Banckert left active service on 3 December 1674, though remaining commander of the Zealandic fleet. In 1678 he joined the admiralty council, which was exceptional for a navy officer. He died in Middelburg, where he was buried in St Peter's Church.
