= Roemer Vlacq (1637–1703) =

Dutch States Navy officer (1637–1703)

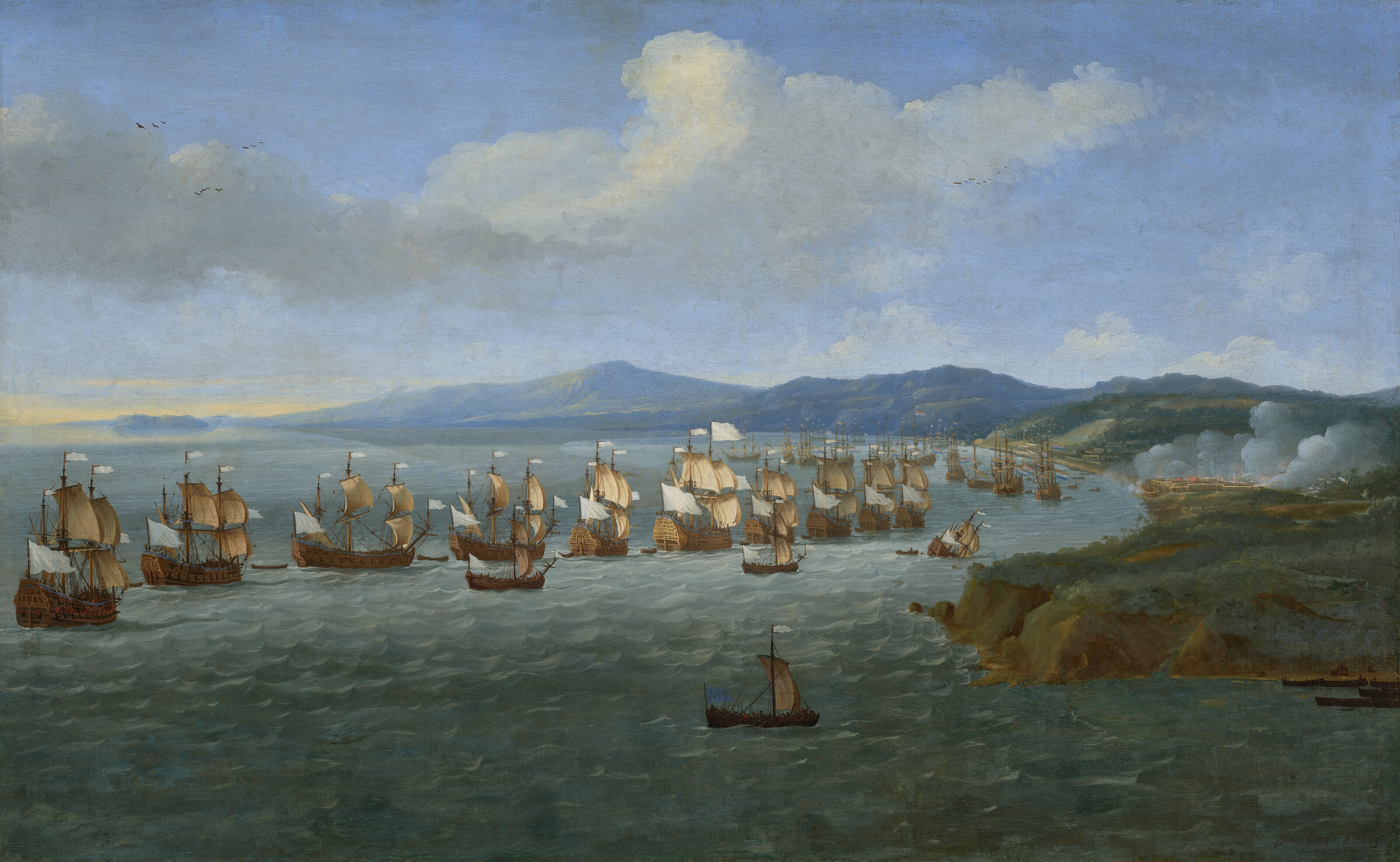
The First Battle of Tobago, at which Vlacq blew up his own ship

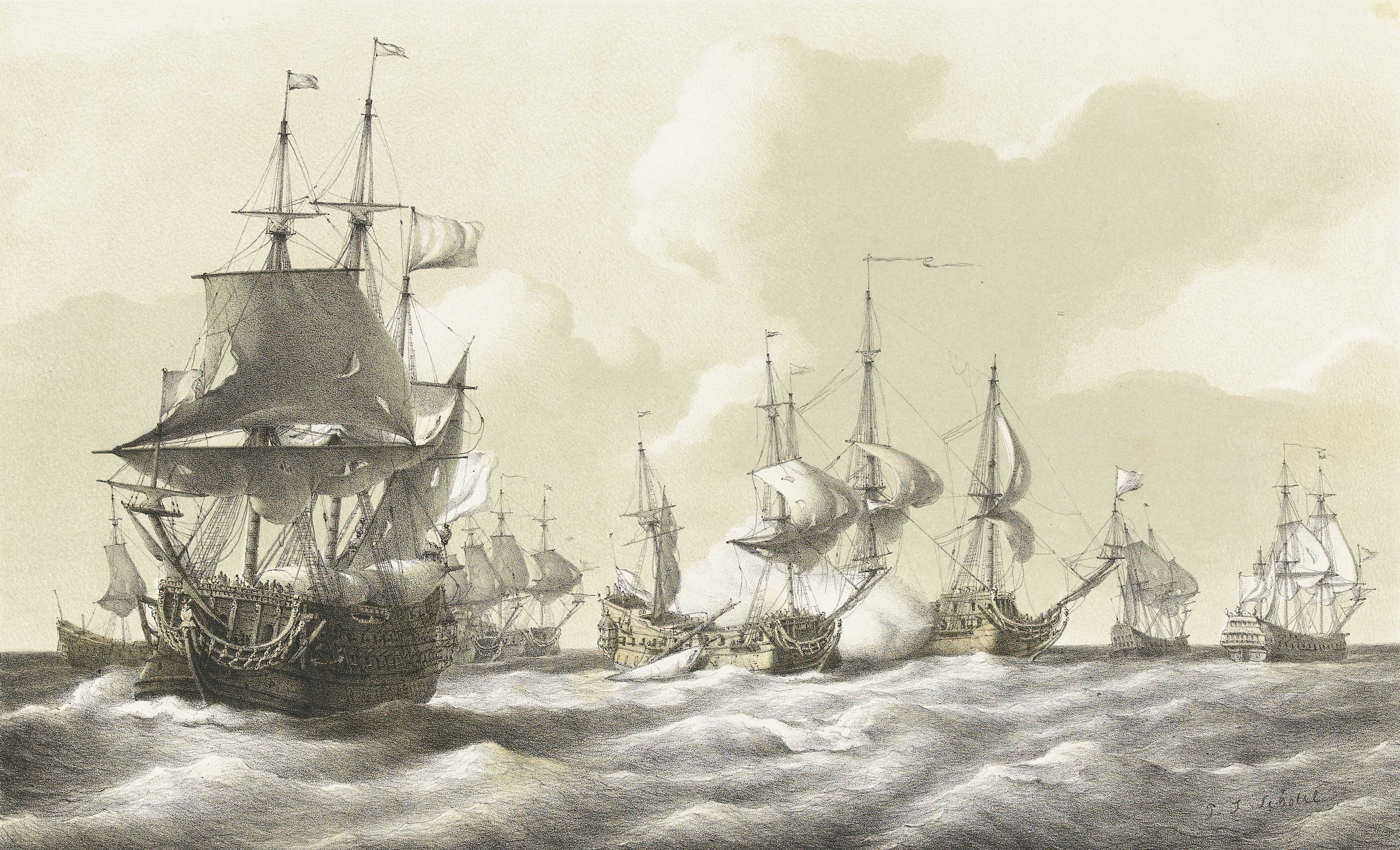
The Battle of Cap de la Roque, at which Vlacq was captured

Roemer Vlacq (August 1637 – 17 July 1703) was a Dutch States Navy officer who blew up his ship to keep it out of enemy hands. Vlacq, son of Anna Jansdochter Verrijn and Dirk Vlacq, a physician, apothecary and notary from Gouda, became lieutenant commander of Kits with the Admiralty of Amsterdam in 1671. In 1672, during the Third Anglo-Dutch War, he commanded the frigate Postiljon during the Battle of Solebay under lieutenant admiral Michiel de Ruyter. In 1673 he took part in all battles, commanding the frigate Brak. In 1674 he was commander of the transport vessel Opperdoes during De Ruyter's expedition against Martinique.

In March 1676 he went to the Caribbean as captain of Huys van Kruyningen under Commodore Jacob Binckes. On 3 March 1677 he was involved in the action of March 1677. When the French boarded his vessel and threatened to overpower his forces, he blew up the ship. Most of the crew lost their lives, but French ships were damaged as well. Vlacq himself survived, although heavily injured and returned to the Netherlands in October of the same year. At the end of the Franco-Dutch War Vlacq performed convoy services: in 1678 to the Bay of Biscay and in 1690 and 1691 in the Baltic Sea. In 1692 Vlacq was suspended for insubordination, but was rehabilitated on 14 February 1696 by stadtholder William and re-entered service with the Admiralty of Amsterdam. He once again went into convoy service.

Vlacq was injured again during the War of the Spanish Succession when a fleet of 110 Dutch and English merchant ships that he was escorting out of Lisbon with five warships hit a French five-warships flotilla under commodore Alain Emmanuel de Coëtlogon on 22 May 1703. During the ensuing Battle of Cap de la Roque, Vlacq sacrificed his warships in a successful attempt to let the merchant convoy escape. Vlacq's 50-gun flagship, the Muiderberg was attacked by the 90-gun thriple-deckers Le Vainqueur and Le Monarque. Vlacq had lost an arm and shoulder and half his crew before surrendering the ship. The entire Dutch flotilla was destroyed. He was made a prisoner and transported to Toulon, where he succumbed to his injuries on 17 July 1703. Vlacq was grandfather to Roemer Vlacq (1712–1774), vice admiral of the Admiralty of Amsterdam.
