= French ship Saint Louis (1692) =

Ship of the line of the French Navy

History

France
- Name: Saint Louis
- Ordered: June 1692
- Builder: Le Havre
- Laid down: June 1692
- Launched: 10 December 1692
- Commissioned: February 1693
- Fate: Sold to be taken to pieces in 1712

General characteristics
- Tonnage: 1,000
- Length: 136 French feet (Note: The French (pre-metric) foot was 6.575% longer than the equivalent English foot.)
- Beam: 37.5 French feet
- Draught: 20 French feet
- Depth of hold: 17 French feet
- Complement: 380 men (300 in peacetime), + 7/9 officers
- Armament: 64 guns

Saint Louis was a second rank two-decker ship of the line of the French Royal Navy. She was armed with 64 guns, comprising twenty-four 24-pounder guns on the lower deck and twenty-six 12-pounder guns on the upper deck, with eight 6-pounder guns on the quarterdeck and six 6-pounder guns on the forecastle.

Designed by Joseph Andrault, Marquis de Langeron, and built by Philippe Cochois, she was begun at Le Havre in June 1692 as one of the replacements for the ships destroyed by an English attack at La Hougue in June 1692. She was launched in December 1692 and completed in February 1693.

Saint Louis, along with her sister ship Éole, took part in the Battle of Vélez-Málaga on 24 August 1704 and was subsequently scuttled at Toulon in July 1707, but was later raised. She was sold in 1712 to be taken to pieces.
