= Battle of Cap de la Roque =

1703 battle of the War of the Spanish Succession

- Part of the War of the Spanish Succession
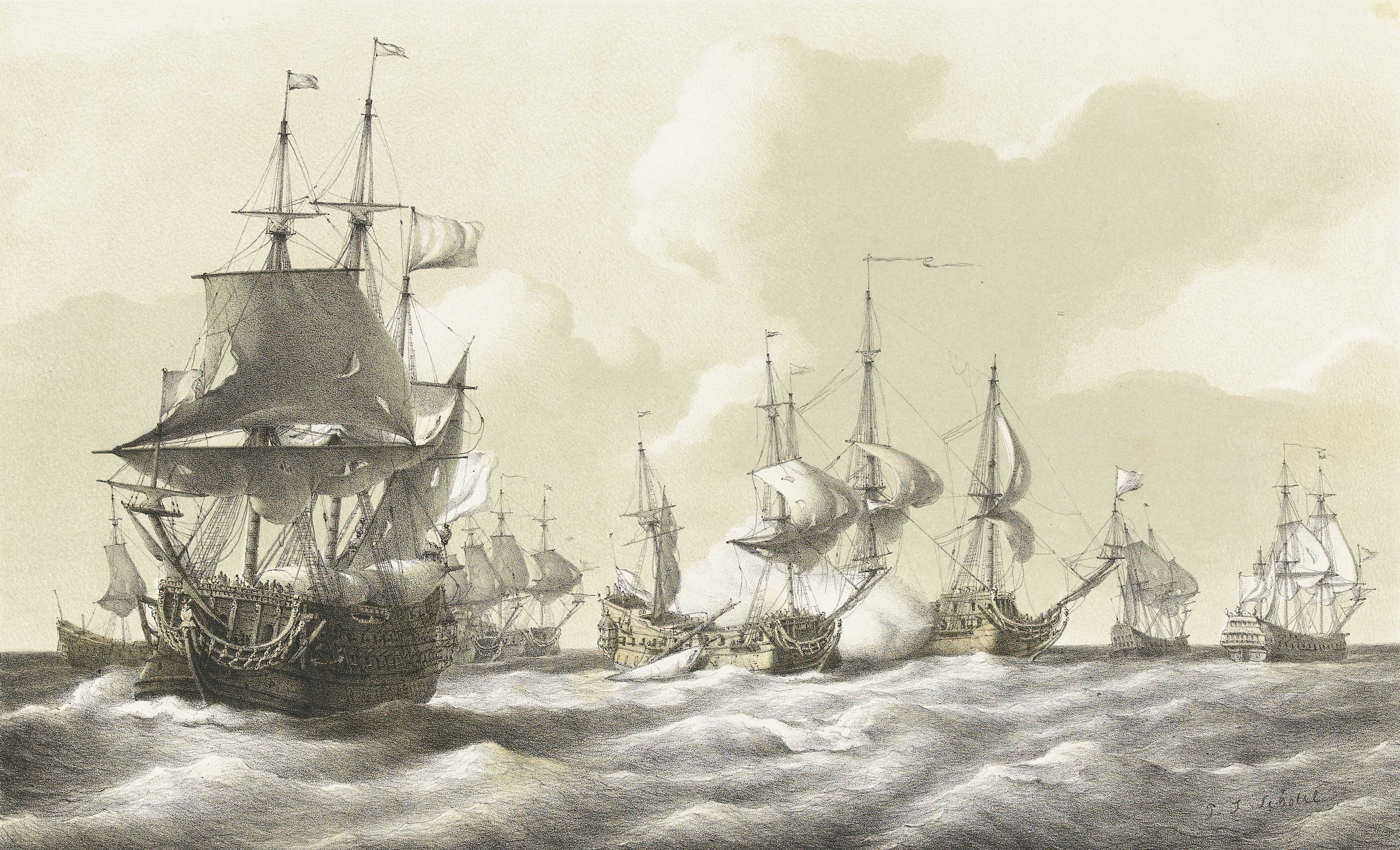
- 1848–1855 illustration of the battle
Date	22 May 1703
Location	Off Cabo da Roca, Atlantic Ocean 38°46′47.00″N 9°31′31.00″W
Result	French victory

Belligerents
France	Dutch Republic; England

Commanders and leaders
Alain Emmanuel de Coëtlogon	Roemer Vlacq (surrendered)

Strength
5 ships of the line 404 guns	4 ships of the line 1 frigate 110 merchant ships 230 guns

Casualties and losses
Unknown	Unknown killed, wounded or captured 3 ships of the line captured 1 ship of the line destroyed 1 frigate captured

The Battle of Cap de la Roque took place on 22 May 1703 between an Anglo-Dutch convoy protected by a Dutch States Navy squadron under Captain Roemer Vlacq and a larger French Navy squadron under Alain Emmanuel de Coëtlogon during the War of the Spanish Succession. During the war the French and Spanish navies were largely unable to challenge their English and Dutch counterparts in fleet actions and therefore had switched to targeting merchant convoys, forcing the latter to protect them.

On 21 May 1703 a large convoy consisting of about 110 English and Dutch merchant ships transporting mainly salt, but also wine and sugar, left Lisbon bound for England. Vlacq's squadron comprised the ships of the line Muiderberg (52), Rotterdam (52), Gaesterland (46) and Schermer (44) and the frigate Rozendaal (36). Vlacq commanded the squadron onboard Muiderberg.

On 22 May the convoy encountered Coëtlogon's squadron, composed of the ships of the line Vainqueur (84), Monarque (90), Éole (64), Orgueilleux (90) and Couronne (76), off Cabo da Roca. Vlacq, after signalling the merchantmen to save themselves, lined up his ships to protect the convoy and engaged the French. The Dutch fought valiantly but the French were too strong and ship after ship had to capitulate.

Muiderberg fought until half her crew was dead or wounded. Vlacq lost an arm and part of his shoulder, but he only struck when the ship's main mast came down and she was on the verge of sinking. The survivors were evacuated and Muiderberg was burnt. Thanks to Vlacq's sacrifice, the convoy got away intact, meaning this Dutch defeat had little impact on the war. Vlacq, his men and the four surviving Dutch warships were taken as prizes to Toulon, were Vlacq died of his wounds on 17 July 1703. The Dutch ships were added into the French Navy.
