= Battle of Schooneveld =

1673 naval battles of the Franco-Dutch War

Coordinates: 51.4308°N 3.5289°E

Battles of Schooneveld
- Part of Franco-Dutch War
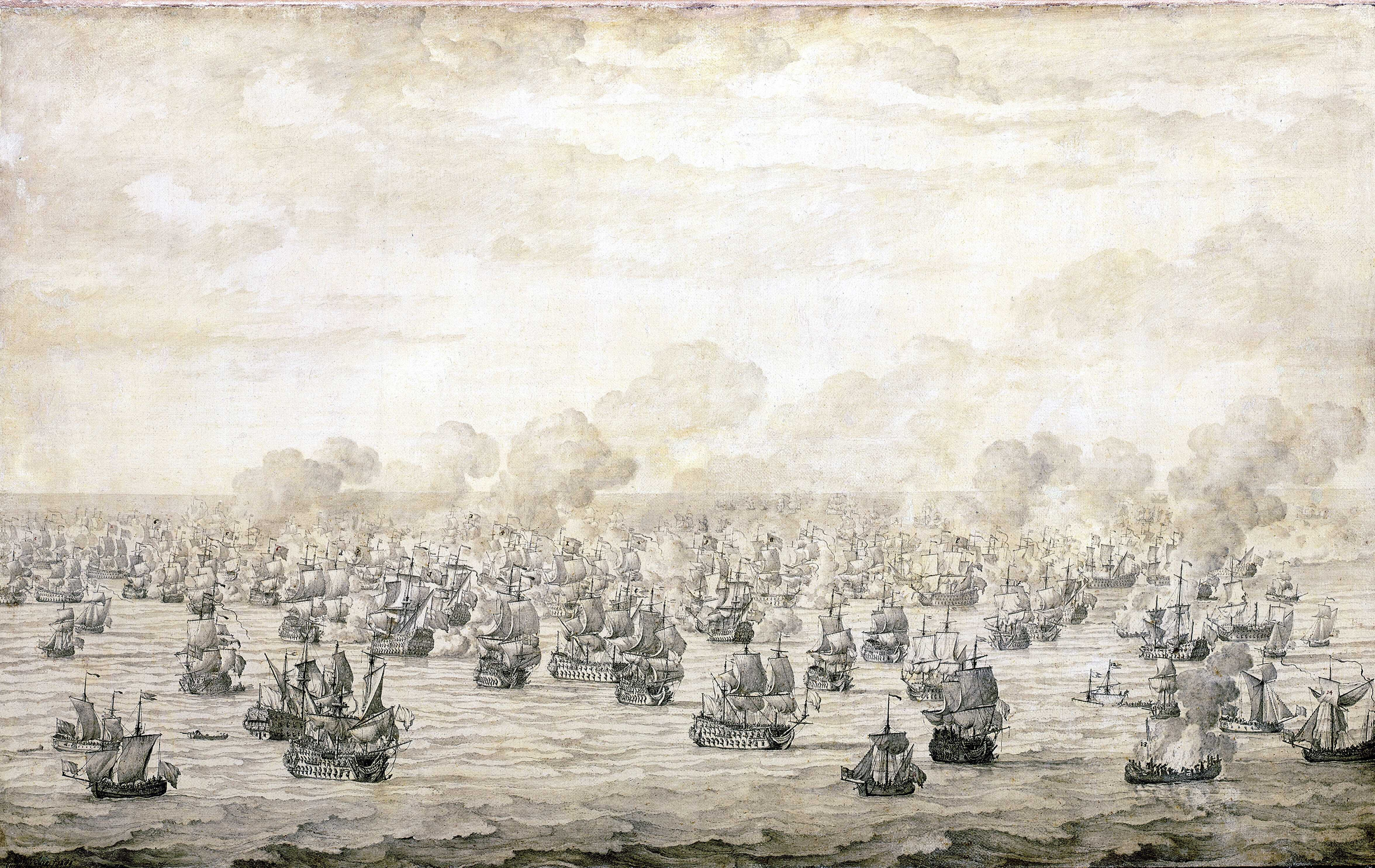
- The first battle of Schooneveld, 7 June 1673 by Willem van de Velde, the elder, painted c.1684.
Date	7 June 1673 and 14 June 1673
Location	North Sea
Result	Dutch victory

Belligerents
England; France	Dutch Republic

Commanders and leaders
(Kingdom of England) Rupert of the Rhine (Kingdom of France) Jean II d'Estrées (Kingdom of England) Edward Spragge	(Dutch Republic) Michiel de Ruyter (Dutch Republic) Cornelis Tromp (Dutch Republic) Adriaen Banckert

Strength
86 ships 24,295 men 4,826 cannon	64 ships 14,762 men 3,157 cannon

Casualties and losses
2 ships	1 ship

The Battles of Schooneveld were two naval battles of the Franco-Dutch War, fought off the coast of the Netherlands on 7 June and 14 June 1673 (New Style; 28 May and 4 June in the Julian calendar then in use in England) between an allied Anglo-French fleet commanded by Prince Rupert of the Rhine on his flagship the Royal Charles, and the fleet of the United Provinces, commanded by Michiel de Ruyter.

The Dutch victories in the two battles, and at the Battle of the Texel that followed in August, saved their country from an Anglo-French invasion.

== Background ==
The Franco-Dutch War of 1672–1678 resulted from the attempts of Louis XIV of France to annex the Spanish Netherlands. In order to achieve this, he had to first eliminate the Dutch Republic, that had in 1668 forced him to halt an offensive, as an adversary. In 1672, troops from France, Münster and Cologne invaded the Netherlands by land, while England's navy attacked Dutch shipping and threatened a seaborne invasion. The conflict between England and the Republic is commonly called the Third Anglo-Dutch War.

The years 1672-1673 were particularly desperate for the Dutch, with the French stopped only by Holland Water Line, a deliberate flooding of large parts of the countryside, and the withdrawing of guns and men from the fleet to augment the army of William III of Orange, now Admiral-General of the fleet. A surprise attack by De Ruyter in June 1672, resulting in the Battle of Solebay, had however prevented the allies from establishing naval superiority on the North Sea, keeping open the sea lanes so vital to Dutch trade.

When the French invaded, the Orangist party took power, falsely accusing the former leading politician Johan de Witt and his personal friend Lieutenant-Admiral Michiel de Ruyter of plotting to betray the Republic to the French. The Orangists themselves were in fact subsidised by the English. Both England and France hoped to create a Dutch puppet state, using the enormous Dutch mercantile assets to gain world trade dominance, each expecting that any moment the Dutch might surrender to one of them, but fearing not being the one chosen. Therefore, during the battles, mutual suspicion between the French and the English was considerable. This reflected political divisions within the Dutch fleet. De Ruyter was seen as pro-French, while Lieutenant-Admiral Cornelis Tromp, readmitted to the Dutch fleet early in 1673, was a, traditionally pro-English, Orangist. William had asked De Ruyter to purify the fleet from supporters of the old States regime, but the admiral refused. De Ruyter accused Tromp in his face of hoping to sabotage his command in the middle of a battle, but his fears proved to be unfounded. Tromp cared for battle honours above all else.

Michiel de Ruyter, since February 1673 Lieutenant-Admiral-General of the confederate Dutch fleet, planned to blockade the main English fleet in the Medway by sinking blockships in its narrowest part, then deal with the remaining English squadrons at his leisure. But the English fleet took to sea in time to prevent this operation, and De Ruyter retreated on 15 May to the Schooneveld, the coastal waters at the mouth of the Schelde River, near the island of Walcheren, to prevent the allies from establishing the naval superiority needed for the transport and landing of a force of 6,000 soldiers of the English Army waiting at Yarmouth. The Schooneveld basin, between two shoals, was so narrow the allies could not take advantage of their numerical superiority. There, De Ruyter was joined by Tromp, adding the squadrons of the admiralties of Amsterdam and the Northern Quarter to that of the Admiralty of de Maze and the Zealandic fleet. De Ruyter read a message from the stadtholder to his captains, informing them they were not only the champions of their nation but of the whole of Christendom and that for any cowards, "the least safe place will be the ports of the State for there they shall escape neither the severe hand of Justice nor the curse and hatred of their compatriots", many later being overheard repeating these words to themselves.

== First battle ==
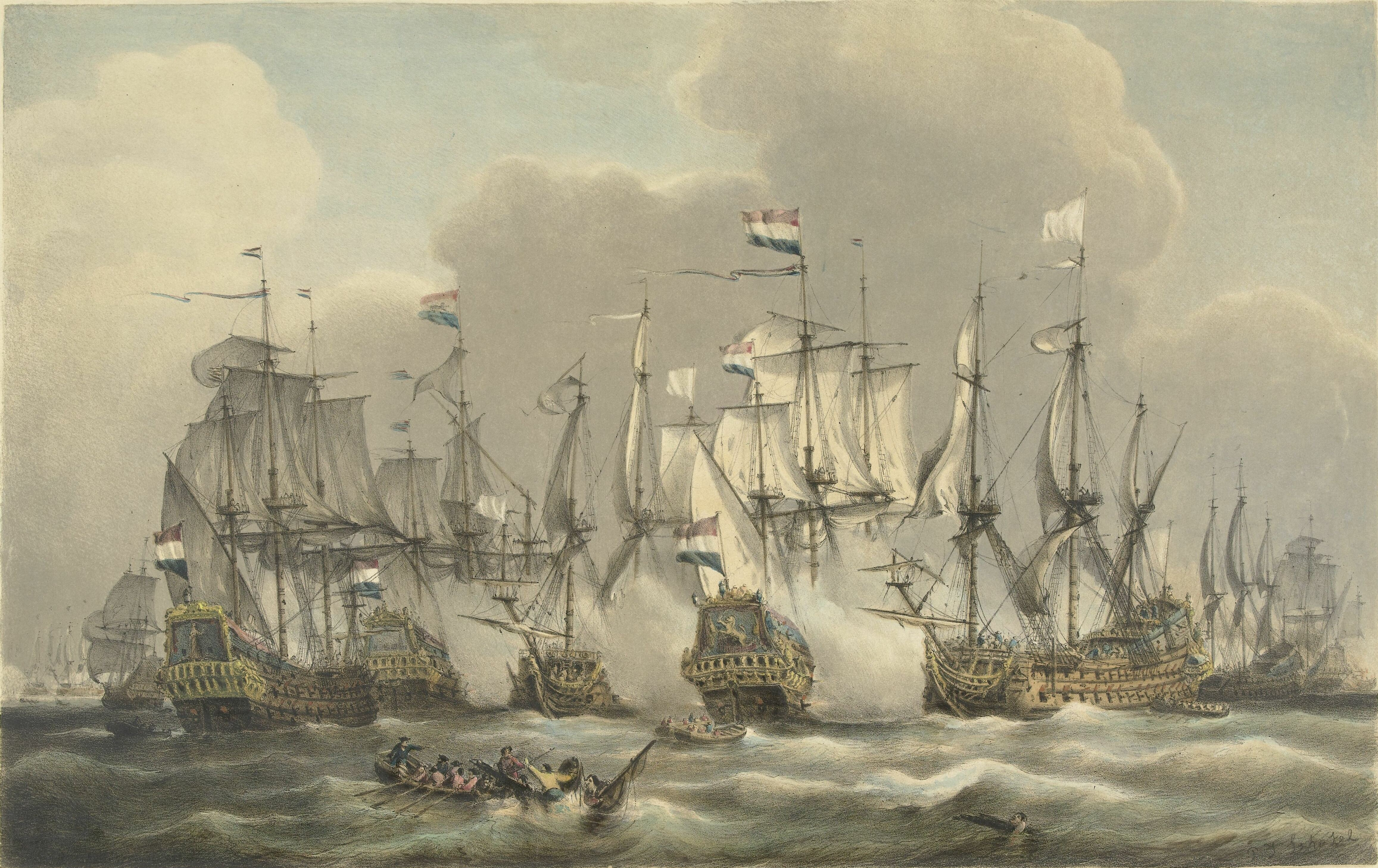
The first Battle of Schooneveld

On 2 June 1673 (New Style; 23 May in the Julian calendar then in use in England), the allies, deciding they had waited long enough, approached the Dutch fleet. Prince Rupert had a considerable superiority in ships (eighty-six against sixty-four), men (24,295 to 14,762) and cannon (4,826 to 3,157) — indeed the Dutch admirals nicknamed their fleet the "Little Hope". The Dutch fleet was smaller than usual because the Admiralty of Frisia was unable to assist, that province and Groningen being attacked by Bernhard von Galen, bishop of Münster. However a sudden storm prevented a battle. On 7 June, the wind blowing from the northwest, Rupert tried again and arranged his own squadron of the Red in the van, the French squadron of the White commanded by Jean II d'Estrées in the centre, and Sir Edward Spragge's squadron of the Blue in the rear. The Dutch van was commanded by Tromp, the centre by Lieutenant-Admiral Aert Jansse van Nes under direct supervision of De Ruyter himself and the rear by Lieutenant-Admiral Adriaen Banckert.

Rupert, convinced that the smaller Dutch fleet would withdraw to Hellevoetsluis when pressed, detached a special squadron at nine in the morning to cut off the retreating Dutch from the north. In this taskforce he concentrated all lighter ships from the regular squadrons so that it would be able to manoeuvre more easily over the shoals. However, De Ruyter did not budge. When however the squadron at last returned to the main allied line, joining Rupert's squadron, the Dutch started to move, but surprisingly in the direction of the enemy. This forced Rupert to attack immediately to prevent the Dutch from gaining the weather gauge, before he could form a proper keel line.

The battle began at noon and lasted for nine hours. Using his superior knowledge of the shallow waters, De Ruyter was able to manoeuvre his fleet so close to the shoals that the allies found it difficult to engage without grounding.

Rupert first made contact with the squadron of Cornelis Tromp. He had now about half of the allied fleet with him. Sailing slowly to the northeast after some time he reached the edge of the basin. This gave him the opportunity to surround Tromp from the north with the mass of frigates while simultaneously using his favourable windward position to attack him directly from the west with the heavy English ships. The frigate squadron was now in complete disarray however and could not execute such a complicated manoeuvre. Nor did Rupert choose the direct attack. He was much criticised for this afterwards and defended himself by claiming his approach would have been blocked by shoals. This was simply not true and Rupert knew it. Whatever his motives he turned to the southwest, both fleets bombarding each other from a distance, the Dutch inferiority in numbers compensated by the fact that their leeward position gave their guns a better range and the lack of a proper battle line in the enemy squadron.

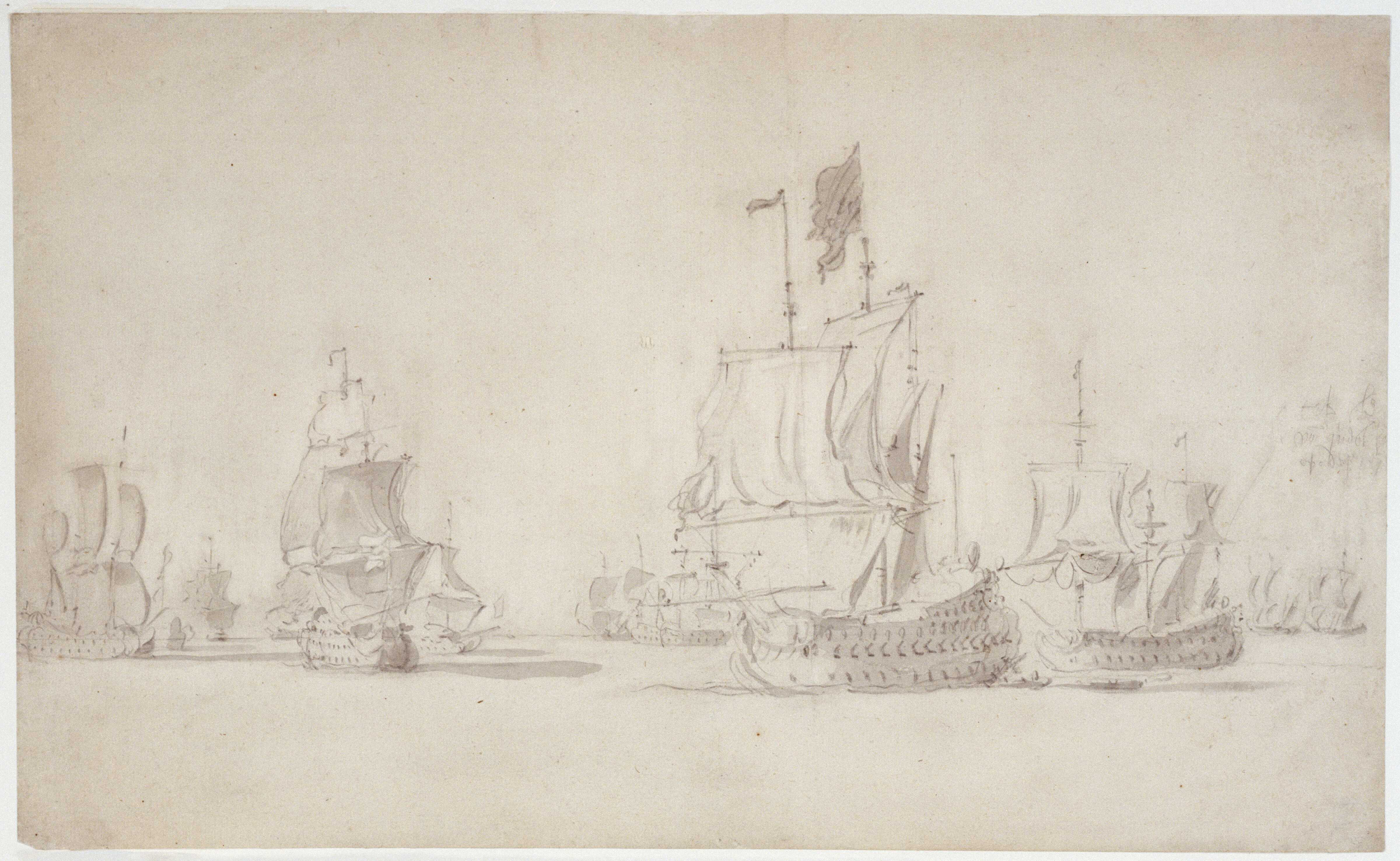
Removing wounded in the allied fleet after the first Battle of Schoonevelt by Willem van de Velde the Elder, drawn in 1673

De Ruyter had at first closely followed Tromp; but becoming aware the French flotilla of de Grancey had joined Spragge against Banckert, creating a gap in the French line, he suddenly tacked to the southwest, separating Tromp from the rest of the Dutch fleet. This greatly surprised the French fleet. The French main force of d'Estrées, both frightened and delighted by what it saw as a brilliant manoeuvre, disengaged slowly to the northwest to keep the weather gauge, but like Rupert didn't use this position to attack. This caused De Ruyter to comment: "The De Zeven Provinciën can still inspire awe among its enemies". The Dutch centre now moved in opposite tack behind the enemy rear. Spragge understood that if De Ruyter reached the southern edge of the basin his force would be trapped between the Dutch centre and rear. He immediately broke formation to tack to the southwest also, narrowly escaping to the west with his flotilla, but leaving the flotillas of Ossorey and Kempthorne behind with that of de Grancey in a slower turn in the same direction. Banckert now united his squadron with the Dutch centre by making a similar but larger turn, sailing behind De Ruyter. The Dutch supreme commander had thus gained an excellent position: the enemy fleet was now divided in four uncoordinated parts and he could attack the confused enemy rear with a numerical superiority having the weather gauge. At that moment he had no knowledge of Tromp's situation however and typically decided not to take any unnecessary risks but to join Tromp with the remainder of the Dutch fleet instead, saying: "First things first; it's better to help friends than to harm enemies". He tacked to the northeast, Banckert now in front, towards both vanguards moving in the opposite direction. Seeing him approach Tromp yelled to his men: "There's Granddad! (the Dutch sailors used this term of endearment for De Ruyter) He's coming to help us. I in return shall never abandon him, as long as I can breathe!" The heat of battle transcended the old animosities. As the Dutch crews of the van had become rather nervous by the size of their opposing force, Tromp had for hours pretended to be in signal contact with the Dutch centre. The allied rear could now escape to the west also.

When the Dutch main force reached Tromp it again tacked to the southwest forming a perfect continuous line of battle with his squadron. The allied rear tried to do likewise with their centre and van, but its formations remained very confused. Spragge, having moved far to the north to reach Tromp, his personal enemy, now inserted his flotilla between d'Estrées and Rupert. The combined Dutch fleet then broke repeatedly through the many gaps in the allied line and Rupert, worried by the mounting disorder in his fleet, was happy to disengage at nightfall, only halting his retreat at first light, when it became clear the Dutch were not pursuing. Two French ships were lost (as well as several French fireships expended ineffectually against the Dutch fleet), one Dutch ship was captured and then recaptured, and one, Deventer (70), sank after grounding the next day. Dutch Vice-Admiral Volckhard Schram (of the van) and Rear-Admiral David Vlugh (of the rearguard) were killed.

== Second battle ==
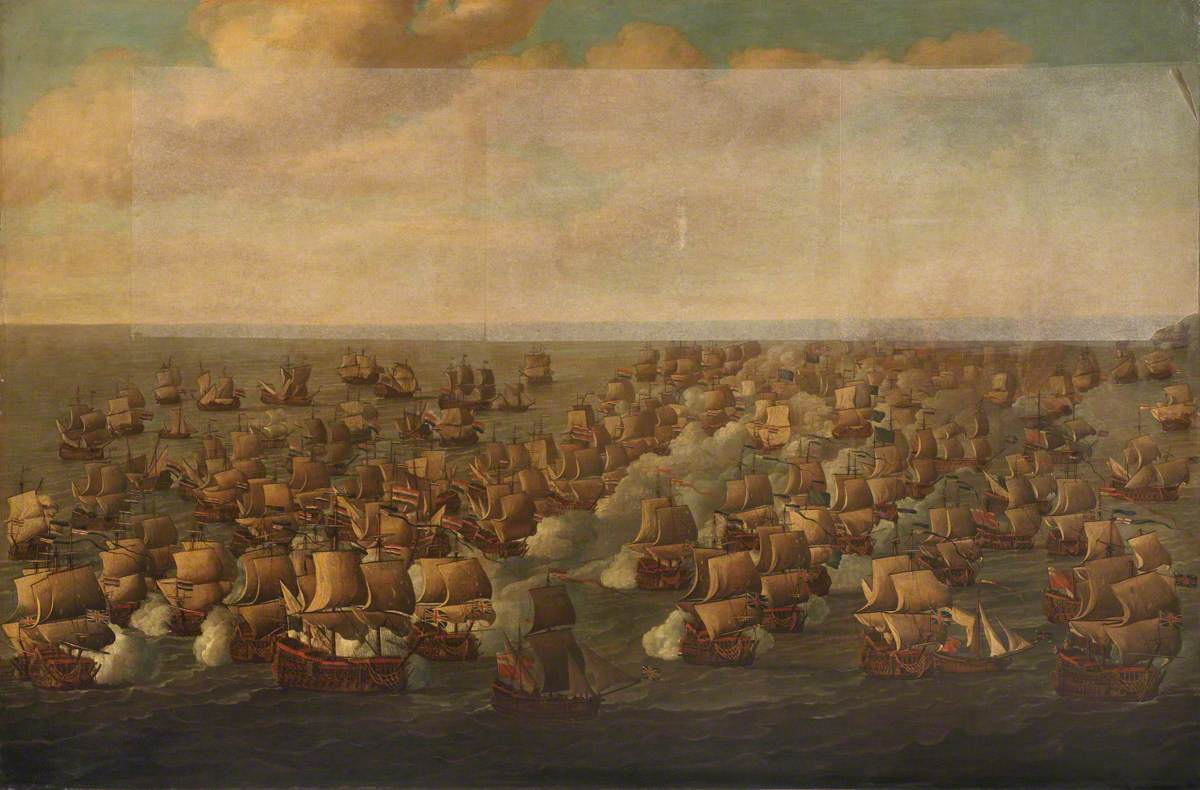
The Second Battle of Schooneveld

The allies cruised off the Dutch coast for a week, each accusing the other of having caused the failure, while the British gave vent to recriminations against each other also. Spragge accused Rupert: "...the battle was, in truth, as ill fought on our side, as ever yet I saw". Worse was to come however. The allies had no intention to enter the Schooneveld again. Captain George Legge of HMS Royal Katherine wrote to his Lord High Admiral the Duke of York: "That hole is too little and the sands too dangerous for us to venture among them again". They hoped to lure the Dutch fleet to open sea; when at first nothing happened they grew so despondent, they were surprised when the Dutch did in fact come out. On 14 June 1673, De Ruyter, reinforced by four ships (including the heavy Oliphant and Voorzichtigheid) and fresh crews and fully resupplied, took advantage of a favourable northwest wind to attack the allied line. In this battle the allies were in total disarray — partly the result of having been two weeks at sea, including one battle — but mainly because of a curious coincidence: it so happened Spragge, now commanding the van, was visiting Rupert the moment the Dutch attacked. He immediately left for his squadron, but Rupert, suddenly fearing Spragge could never reach his force in time, decided to form the van with his own rear squadron. He tried to overtake the French in the centre, but never having made his intentions clear to them, they did their utmost to remain in formation, i.e. in front of Rupert. Needless to say, the chaos was complete.

Edward Spragge wrote in his journal:

The Prince placing himself in the van, the French in the middle, the line-of-battle being 89 men-of-war and small frigates, fireships and tenders, is so very long that I cannot see any sign the general admiral makes, being quite contrary to any custom ever used at sea before, and may prove of ill consequence to us. I know not any reason he has for it except being singular and positive.

Rupert repeatedly raised the bloodflag and then lowered it again upon seeing the confusion among his ships, which made a coordinated attack impossible. De Ruyter, utterly amazed and exclaiming, "What's wrong with this man? Has he gone mad or what?", exploited this disarray by engaging from some distance and firing at the allied masts and rigging, severely damaging Rupert's squadron. The French, when attacked by Banckert, disengaged immediately, very suspicious of the bizarre course of events. Only Tromp clashed with great fury with his eternal enemy Spragge until nightfall.

A heavy sea made it impossible for the allies, though in a leeward position, to open their lower gunports, and strong gales had driven all three fleets dangerously close to the British coast. Rupert now desperately attempted to close with the Dutch to save his fleet from destruction, but they, four miles from the coast, retreated to save theirs, and by the morning of 15 June, the damaged allied fleets sailed into the Thames and De Ruyter was safely back in the Schooneveld.

The allies had not lost any ships, but they had suffered considerable damage and had to return to port for repairs.

== Aftermath ==
By skillful manoeuvre, De Ruyter had fought two engagements against a superior fleet, inflicted such damage against his opponents that they were forced to lift the blockade and retire, and taken care to avoid the decisive battle that the allies were hoping to fight.

After refitting and establishing with great difficulty somewhat more cordial relationships, the allies decided to cruise off the Texel in the hope of drawing De Ruyter out of the Schooneveld and bringing him to action. But the resulting Battle of the Texel was a Dutch victory, and England was forced to withdraw from the costly and unproductive war.
