= Alain Emmanuel de Coëtlogon =

French Navy officer (1646–1730)

Alain-Emmanuel de Coëtlogon
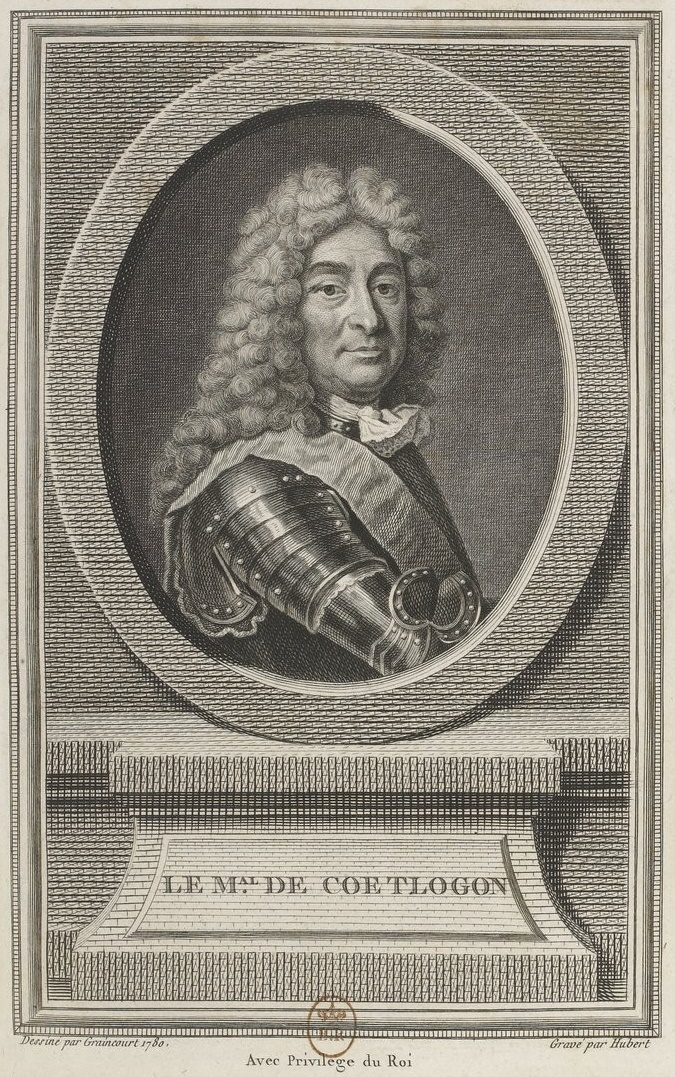
- 1780 portrait
- Born: 4 December 1646; Rennes, Brittany
- Died: 6 June 1730 (aged 83) Paris, France
- Allegiance: France
- Branch: French Navy
- Service years: 1668–1730
- Rank: Lieutenant général des armées navales
- Commands: Levant Fleet
- Conflicts: Franco-Dutch War; Battle of Solebay; Battle of Schooneveld; Battle of Texel; Battle of Augusta; Nine Years' War; Battle of Bantry Bay; Battle of Beachy Head (1690); Battles of Barfleur and La Hogue; Battle of Lagos (1693); War of the Spanish Succession; Battle of Cap de la Roque; Battle of Málaga (1704)
- Awards: Order of the Holy Spirit; Order of Saint Michael; Order of Saint Louis

Lieutenant général des armées navales Alain-Emmanuel de Coëtlogon (4 December 1646 – 6 June 1730) was a French Navy officer who served in the Franco-Dutch War, Nine Years' War and War of the Spanish Succession.

== Life ==
He was born at Rennes, the seventh son of Louis de Coëtlogon, vicomte de Méjusseaume (d.1657), counsellor to the King in the Parlement of Rennes, and Louise Le Meneust de Bréquigny. He enjoyed an excellent education in Rennes, and joined a military academy, where he graduated in 1668. He served the major part of his career under the comte de Tourville. In June 1672 he fought in the Battle of Solebay on Tourville's ship under vice-admiral d'Estrées. He also distinguished himself in the battles of Schooneveld in June 1673, and Texel in August.

On 26 January 1675, at just 29 years old, he was made captain of his own ship. He fought with Tourville around Sicily and was wounded while in command of the Éclatant at the Battle of Agosta where De Ruyter was mortally wounded. In 1680, Coëtlogon studied theology and considered entering the church. Although he returned to the sea, he was profoundly changed by this spiritual experience, and led an austere, celibate life. In 1683, he commanded various ships, first around Denmark, then in North Africa. In 1688 he took part in the bombardment of Algiers under Jean II d'Estrées.

During the Nine Years' War, he was in command of the 54-gun Diamant as part of Châteaurenault's fleet which landed French troops in Ireland, and fought in the Battle of Bantry Bay on 11 May 1689; on 1 November he was promoted to squadron leader. During the Battle of Beachy Head in July 1690, he commanded a division of the van under Tourville, destroying several Dutch ships. He also participated in the Battle of La Hogue (1692), and the Battle of Lagos (1693) where, with eight ships, he hunted down and captured five Dutch ships under the guns of the Gibraltar forts. In November 1693, he participated in the defence of Saint-Malo against the English. On 1 February 1694, he was appointed Knight of the Order of Saint Louis.

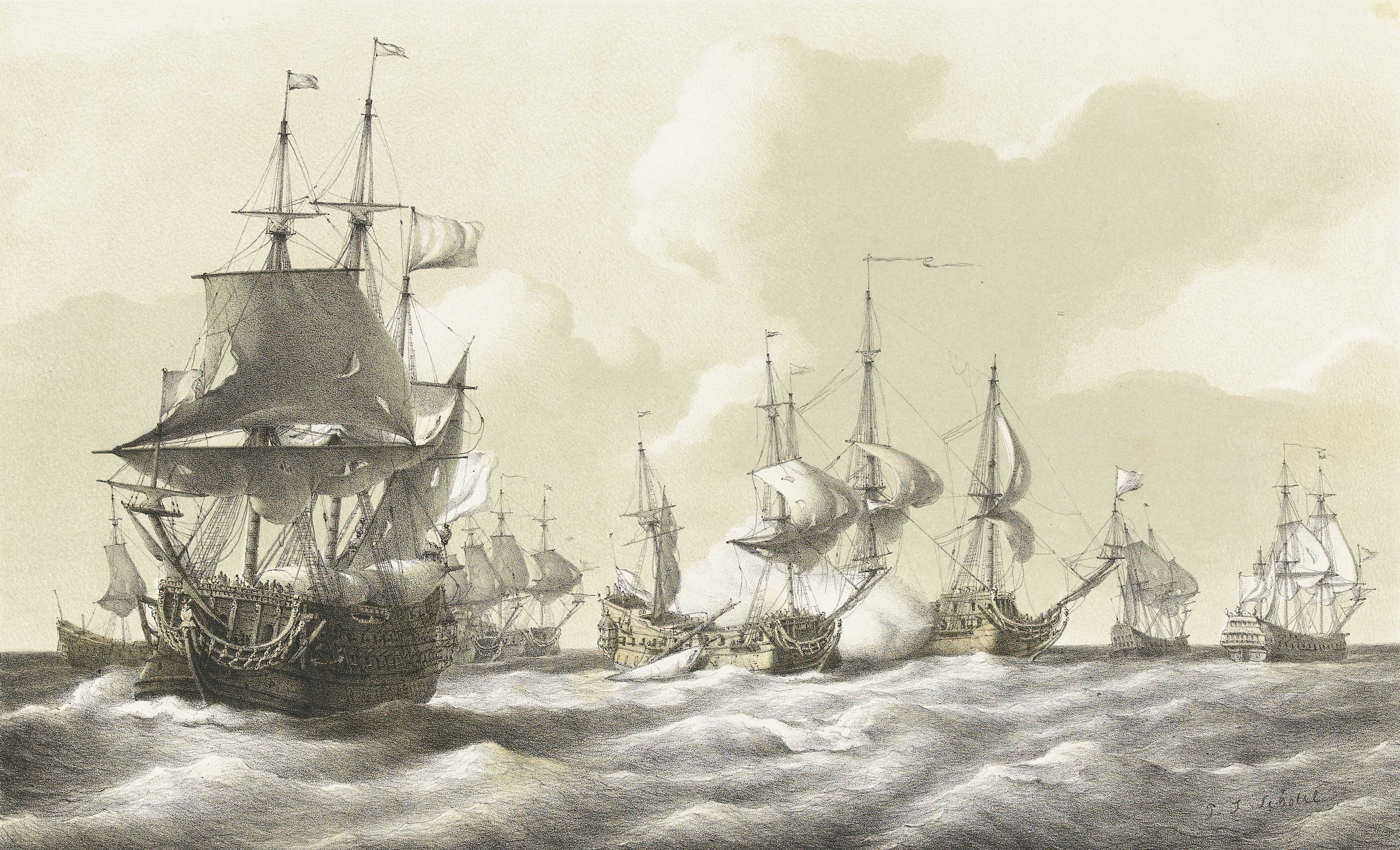
The Battle of Cap de la Roque, at which Coëtlogon won a major victory

In May 1701, Coëtlogon was promoted to lieutenant général des armées navales and given the title of marquis, which he would never use. The following year, during the War of the Spanish Succession, he was sent to the Americas with five ships in service of Spain to protect the Spanish colonies, remaining at length in Veracruz. However, Coëtlogon was most famous for winning the Battle of Cap de la Roque off Lisbon on 22 May 1703. On board the Vainqueur, Coëtlogon, commanding a squadron with four other ships - the Monarque, Éole, Orgueilleux and Couronne - intercepted a Dutch convoy and defeated its five escorting Dutch warships - the Muiderberg (which was sunk), Rozendaal, Rotterdam, Beschermer, and Gaasterland. The last-named four Dutch ships were all captured and added into the French Mediterranean fleet. But the victory was not complete, as the merchantmen in the Dutch convoy escaped.

His last battle was the Battle of Vélez-Málaga on 24 August 1704, commanding the 90-gun Tonnant. He then became Naval Commander in Brest and received many decorations. The last four years of his life he lived in a Jesuit order. On 1 June 1730 he was finally made Marshal of France, six days before his death in Paris. Several ships were named after Coëtlogon, especially a frigate which was active during the Boshin war (1868–1869) in Japan, and later an armoured cruiser.
