= French ship Orgueilleux (1691) =

Ship of the line of the French Navy

History

France
- Name: Orgueilleux (meaning "Proud")
- Builder: Lorient Dockyard
- Laid down: June 1690
- Launched: 29 March 1691
- Commissioned: May 1691
- Fate: Broken up at Toulon in 1716

General characteristics
- Tonnage: 1,600
- Length: 153 French feet (Note: The French (pre-metric) foot was 6.575% longer than the equivalent English foot.)
- Beam: 45 French feet
- Draught: 23 French feet
- Depth of hold: 19¼ French feet
- Complement: 550, later 650 men (400 in peacetime), + 9 officers
- Armament: 88, later 90 guns

Orgueilleux was a First Rank three-decker ship of the line of the French Royal Navy. She was initially armed with 88 guns, comprising twenty-eight 36-pounder guns on the lower deck, thirty 18-pounder guns on the middle deck, and twenty-four 8-pounder guns on the upper deck, with six 6-pounder guns on the quarterdeck, but an extra pair of 8-pounders was added soon after completion. By 1706 one pair of 36-pounders had been removed and an extra pair of 6-pounders added on the quarterdeck to maintain the 90-gun rating.

Designed and constructed by Laurent Coulomb, she was begun at Lorient Dockyard in June 1690 and launched on 29 March of the following year. She was completed in May 1691 and took part in the Battle of Barfleur on 29 May 1692, in the Battle of Lagos on 28 June 1693, in the Battle of Cap de la Roque on 22 May 1703, and in the Battle of Velez-Malaga on 24 August 1704.

Orgueilleux was among the fifty warships scuttled at Toulon on Louis XIV's orders during the Siege of Toulon in July 1707 but was subsequently refloated. She was condemned at Toulon on 11 March 1713, and by Order of 1 December 1715 she was taken to pieces - the work being completed by August 1716.
