= Third Anglo-Dutch War =

1672–74 war related to the Franco-Dutch War

- Part of the Anglo-Dutch Wars and Franco-Dutch War
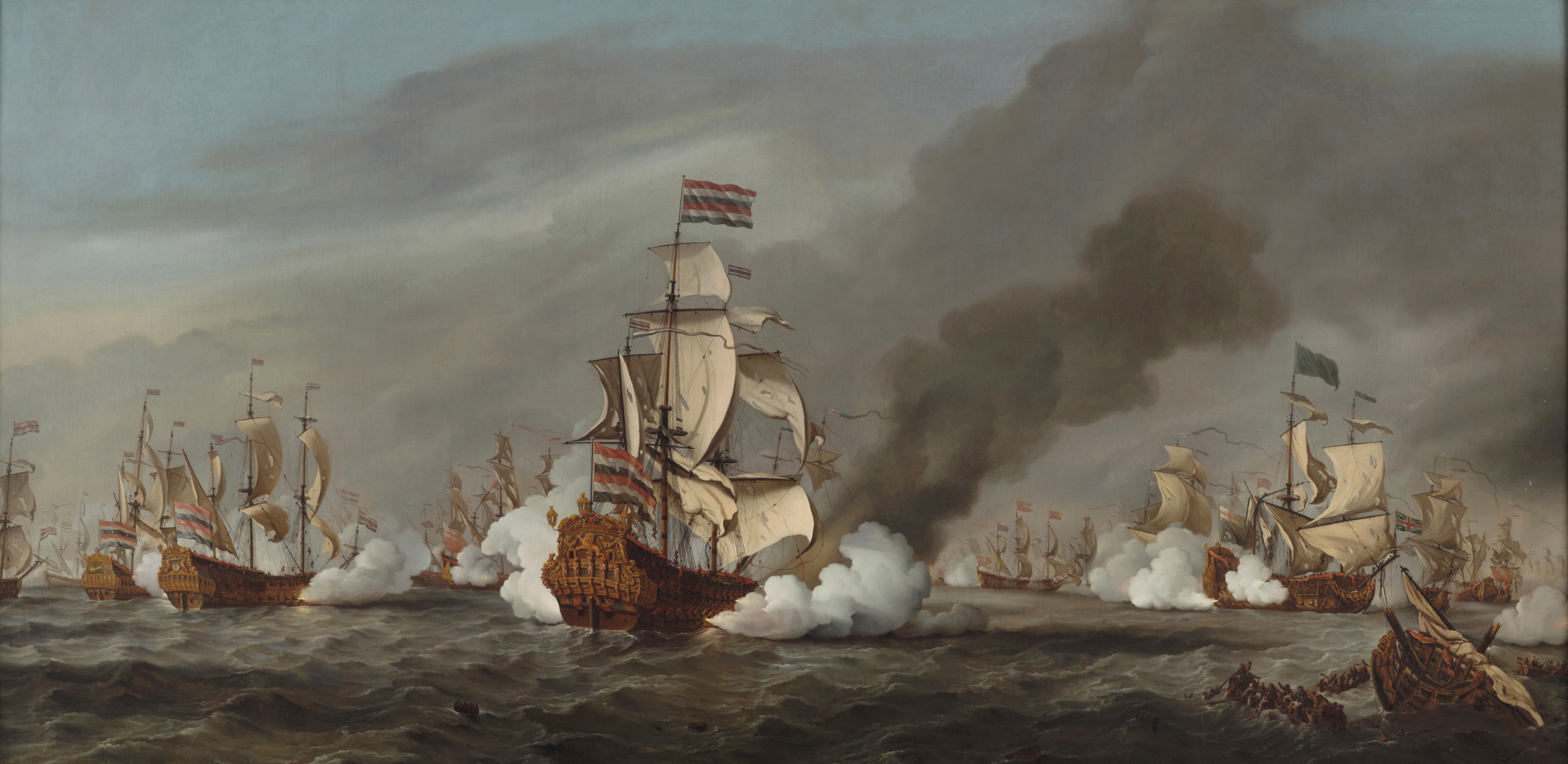
- The Battle of Texel, by Van de Velde the Younger
Date	27 March 1672 – 19 February 1674 (1 year, 10 months, 3 weeks and 2 days)
Location	North Sea, New York, Saint Helena, East Indies, India
Result	Treaty of Westminster

Belligerents
England; France	Dutch Republic

Commanders and leaders
(Kingdom of England) Charles II (Kingdom of England) Duke of York (Kingdom of England) Prince Rupert (Kingdom of England) Earl of Sandwich † (Kingdom of France) Louis XIV (Kingdom of France) Jean II d'Estrées	(Dutch Republic) Johan de Witt X (Dutch Republic) William III of Orange (Dutch Republic) Michiel de Ruyter (Dutch Republic) Adriaen Banckert (Dutch Republic) Willem van Ghent † (Dutch East India Company) Rijckloff van Goens

The Third Anglo-Dutch War, (Note: Dutch: Derde Engels-Nederlandse Oorlog) began on 27 March 1672, and concluded on 19 February 1674. A naval conflict between the Dutch Republic and England, in alliance with France, it is considered a related conflict of the wider 1672 to 1678 Franco-Dutch War.

In the 1670 Secret Treaty of Dover, Charles II of England agreed to support an attack by Louis XIV of France on the Dutch Republic. By doing so, Louis hoped to gain control of the Spanish Netherlands, while Charles sought to restore the damage to his prestige caused by the 1667 Raid on the Medway. Under the treaty, Charles also received secret payments which he hoped would make him financially independent of Parliament.

The French offensive in May and June 1672 quickly overran most of the Republic, with the exception of the core province of Holland, where they were halted by water defences. In early June, the Anglo-French fleet was badly damaged by the Dutch under Michiel de Ruyter at the Battle of Solebay. Shortly thereafter, Johan de Witt resigned as Grand Pensionary, and Charles' nephew William III of Orange was appointed Stadtholder. William rebuffed attempts by Charles to make peace, knowing the French alliance was unpopular in England, while French success brought him support from Emperor Leopold and Spain.

By the end of 1672, the Dutch had regained much of the territory lost in May, and with hopes of a quick victory gone, Parliament refused to continue funding the war. Between June and July 1673, the Dutch and Anglo-French fleets fought four separate battles, which ended any prospect of an English landing. The English merchant fleet meanwhile suffered heavy losses to Dutch privateers. In addition, Louis now focused on taking the Spanish Netherlands, an objective as harmful to English interests as it was to Dutch. The resulting increase in domestic opposition forced Charles to agree the Second Peace of Westminster in February 1674.

== Background ==
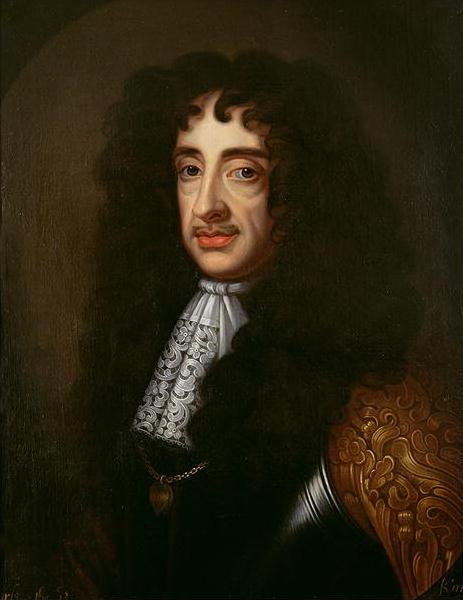
Charles II of England; the war was driven by his desire for the French subsidies that offered financial freedom from Parliament.

The 1652–1654 First Anglo-Dutch War was the result of commercial rivalry and Orangist support for the exiled Charles II, uncle of William of Orange. Peace terms agreed in 1654 with the English Protectorate included the permanent exclusion of the House of Orange-Nassau from public office, ensuring Republican political control. When Charles regained the English throne in 1660, his Orangist links meant Grand Pensionary Johan de Witt opposed negotiations for an Anglo-Dutch alliance; after these broke down, he agreed a treaty of assistance with Louis XIV in 1662.

Despite their long-standing support in the Dutch Eighty Years' War against Spain, French objectives in the Low Countries threatened Dutch commercial interests. The 1648 Peace of Münster permanently closed the Scheldt estuary, benefiting De Witt's power base of Amsterdam by eliminating their closest rival, Antwerp, and keeping it shut was a vital objective. Changes in this region also concerned England, since control of ports on the North Flemish coast allowed a hostile power to blockade the Channel.

In 1665, an attack by the Duke of York on the West-Indische Compagnie led to the Second Anglo-Dutch War; in the first 18 months, the Dutch suffered a serious naval defeat at Lowestoft, an invasion by Münster and an attempted Orangist coup, both financed by England. The prospect of an English victory led Louis to activate the 1662 treaty, although the Dutch considered the support provided inadequate. When the States of Holland blocked his requests for territorial compensation, Louis launched the War of Devolution in May 1667 and rapidly occupied much of the Spanish Netherlands and Franche-Comté.

His refusal to recall Parliament forced Charles to pay off his fleet in early 1667, leading to the humiliating Raid on the Medway. Despite this triumph, the Dutch were more worried by French gains; they quickly negotiated an end to the war in July 1667, then started talks in London on a shared approach for reversing them. Sensing an opportunity, Charles proposed an alliance to Louis, who was unwilling to pay the subsidies demanded; however, De Witt welcomed English envoys to The Hague, seeing it as a way to put pressure on France.

French tariffs on imports imposed in early 1667 increased opposition in the States General, who preferred a weak Spain as a neighbour to a strong France. On 23 January 1668, the Republic, England and Sweden signed the Triple Alliance, committing to mutual support in the event of an attack on one by France or Spain. A secret clause agreed to provide Spain military assistance if France continued the war. Charles disclosed the secret clause to Louis, who felt betrayed by the Dutch. Louis returned most of his acquisitions in the 1668 Treaty of Aix-la-Chapelle, although he retained Charleroi and Tournai.

Concluding the Dutch would never voluntarily accept French aims in the Spanish Netherlands, Louis decided the best way to achieve them was to eliminate the Republic. This meant breaking up the Triple Alliance; since the subsidies promised by the Dutch remained unpaid, it was easy to detach Sweden by offering money, making England his next target. The French and English kings negotiated the 1670 Secret Treaty of Dover, using Henrietta of England as a mediator, Charles' sister and Louis' sister in law. Very few English statesmen were aware of its provisions.

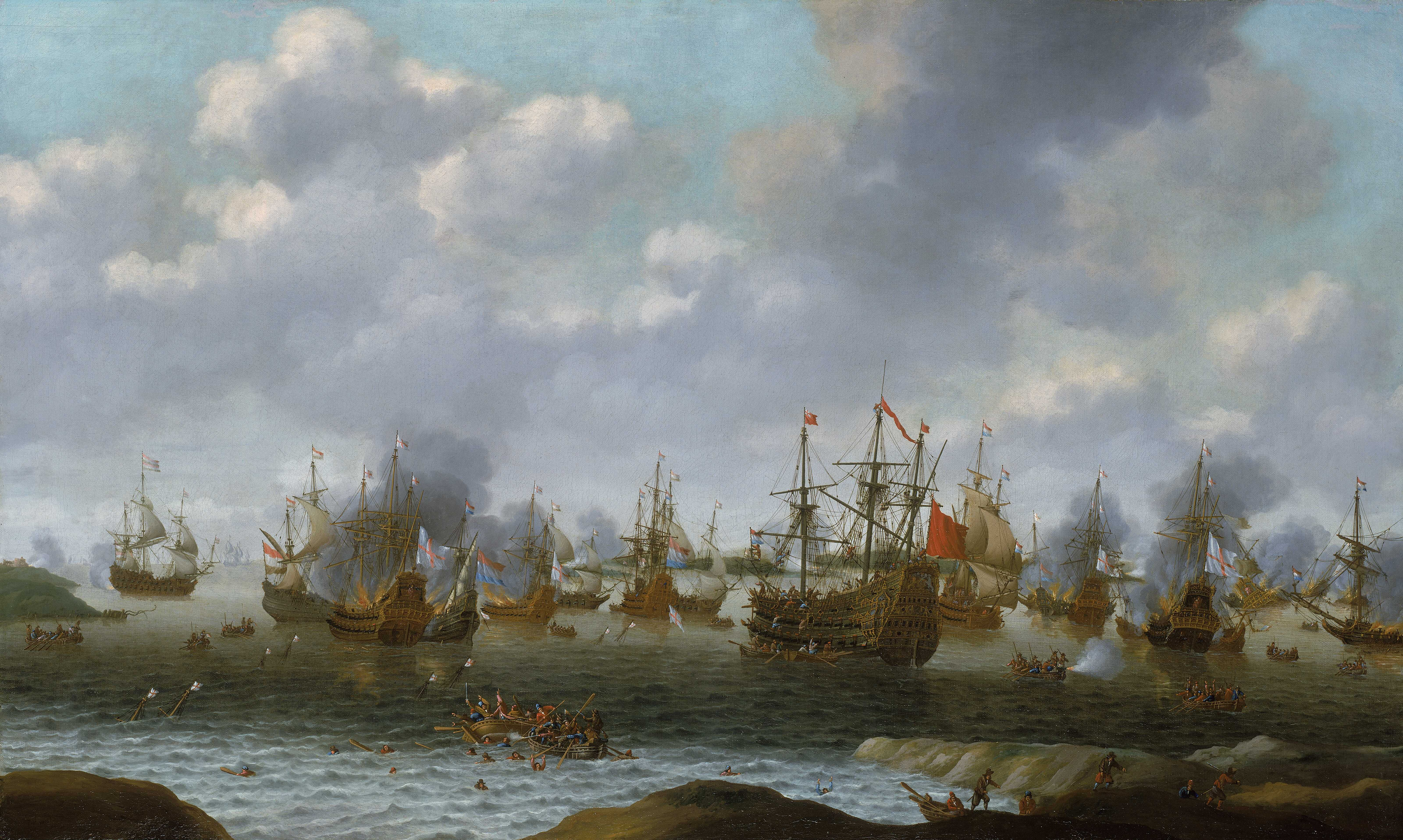
The 1667 Raid on the Medway severely damaged Charles' prestige

Terms included an Anglo-French military alliance against the Republic, creation of a Dutch rump state for his nephew William and a British brigade for the French army. The treaty was signed in December 1670, but omitted secret clauses not revealed until 1677; Louis agreed to pay Charles £230,000 per year for the brigade, £1 million for the navy and £200,000 for his public conversion to Catholicism, the timing of which was left up to him. Aware Louis was negotiating with De Witt over dividing the Spanish Netherlands, Charles demanded Walcheren, Cadzand and Sluys, whose possession would give him control of Dutch sea routes.

National tensions between England and the Republic significantly diminished after 1667, and there was minimal support for an anti-Dutch alliance with France. Exchanging the Dutch colony of New Amsterdam for the spice island of Run resolved a major area of dispute, while both were concerned by French aims in the Low Countries, and English merchants were also affected by French tariffs. Most Dutch and English politicians considered the Triple Alliance an essential protection against French expansion; in early 1671, Parliament allocated money to ensure the Royal Navy could fulfil its obligations under the treaty.

== Preparations ==
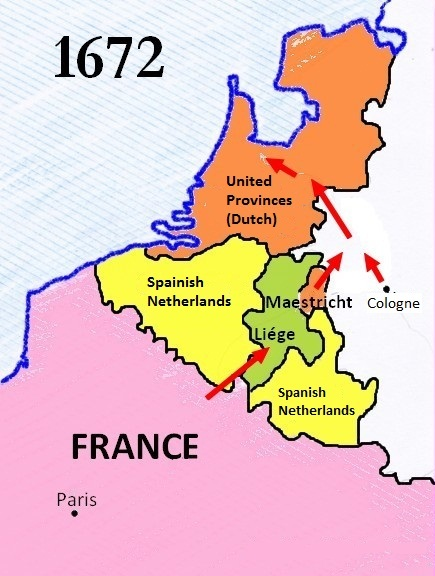
Agreements with Münster and Cologne allowed the French to bypass the Spanish Netherlands.

Louis instructed de Pomponne, his ambassador in The Hague, to continue negotiations with De Witt as a delaying tactic while he finalised invasion plans. The English envoy, Sir William Temple, was entrusted by Charles with the same mission. Since Dutch defences were concentrated along their southern border with the Spanish Netherlands, Louis agreed an alliance with Electoral Cologne, allowing his army to advance through the Principality of Liège for an attack from the east (see Map). It also complied with an undertaking to Emperor Leopold I not to use the Spanish Netherlands as an invasion route.

In April 1672, France agreed to subsidise Sweden to remain neutral, while also promising military assistance if 'threatened' by Brandenburg-Prussia. This offset an agreement of 6 May between the Dutch and Frederick William, whose territories included the Duchy of Cleves on their eastern border. Hoping for English backing, on 25 February 1672 the States General appointed Charles' 22-year-old nephew William as captain-general of the federal army, which had an authorised total of 83,000 men. Uncertainty over French strategy meant most of these were based in the wrong place, while many garrisons were below strength; on 12 June, one commander reported he had only four companies available from an official total of eighteen.

The Republic was better prepared for a naval war, although to avoid provoking the English, on 4 February the States General reduced the naval budget from 7.9 million to 4.8 million guilders. At the end of the Second Anglo-Dutch War in 1667, the Dutch Navy was the largest in Europe but by 1672 the combined Anglo-French fleet outnumbered them by over a third. However, the French were inexperienced, their ships badly designed and their relationship with the Royal Navy was damaged by mutual suspicion.

In the battles of 1666, the Dutch had been hampered by lack of familiarity with their new, much heavier, warships, the complex federal command system and conflict between Michiel de Ruyter and Cornelis Tromp. By 1672, these had been corrected, and De Ruyter's intensive training of his fleet in line-of-battle manoeuvres installed a new sense of coherence and discipline. Dutch ships were generally better gun platforms, whose shallow draft suited operations close to shore but were slow and less effective in open seas. Although Dutch numbers were further reduced by Friesland retaining ships for defence against Münster, better training and design gave them operational equality.

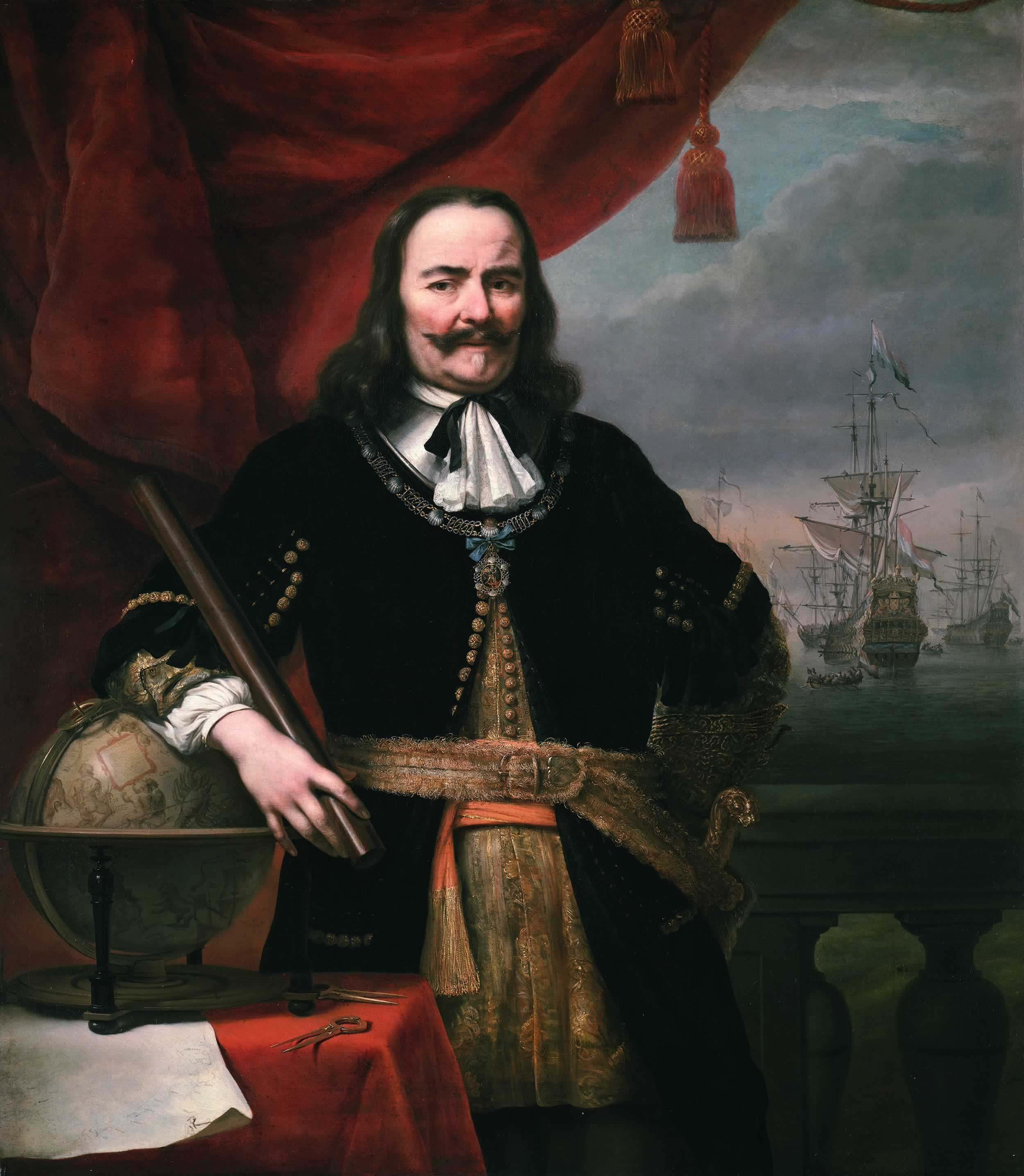
Lieutenant-Admiral Michiel de Ruyter, whose training compensated for numerical inferiority

England provided two-thirds of an Anglo-French fleet of 98 "great ships and frigates", whose role was to gain control of Dutch waters, land an expeditionary force and attack its shipping. Parliament generally approved naval expenditure, seen as protecting English trade, but refused to fund land forces. The British brigade was largely composed of Dumbarton's, a mercenary unit in French service since 1631, and very few members saw service before the war ended.

Parliament's refusal to fund a war against the Protestant Dutch in alliance with Catholic France meant Charles had to find other sources of finance. In January 1672, he suspended repayment of Crown debts, an act that produced £1.3 million, but had disastrous economic effects. Many City of London merchants were ruined and it shut off the short-term financing essential to international trade. In late March, two weeks before a formal declaration of war, he ordered an attack on a Dutch Levant Company convoy in the Channel, which was beaten off by its escort under Cornelis Evertsen the Youngest. (Note: The Dutch suffered a number of losses in this action, including the Klein Hollandia, whose wreck was finally identified in 2023)

The unpopularity of the French alliance and lack of funding forced Charles to gamble on a quick war. In an attempt to gain support from Nonconformists, he issued a Royal Declaration of Indulgence on 15 March, but by also removing restrictions on Catholics, it did little to reduce opposition. Hostility increased when Charles appointed his Catholic brother James as Lord High Admiral rather than his Protestant cousin, Prince Rupert. Even the Royal Navy found it difficult to recruit enough sailors to fully man the fleet.

His chief minister, Lord Arlington, was instructed to "break with (the Dutch), yet to lay the breach at their door". This was done using manufactured incidents, including the Merlin affair, which took place near Brill in August 1671. The royal yacht Merlin was ordered to sail through the Dutch fleet, who duly struck their flag in salute, but failed to fire white smoke, an honour afforded only to warships. A formal complaint to the States General was dismissed, while few in England were even aware of the incident. Its use as a pretext, combined with the attack on the Dutch convoy, led some English politicians to declare the conflict "unjust". England declared war on 27 March, followed by France on 6 April.

== The war in 1672 ==
=== Overview ===
When the French invaded the Dutch Republic in May 1672, it initially seemed as if they had won an overwhelming victory. By the end of June, only the Dutch Water Line stood between them and the core province of Holland; by opening the sluices, the Dutch managed to stop the French advance. Dutch survival depended on control of the sea lanes, which ensured they could bring in vital supplies and keep trade routes open. Although outnumbered, on 7 June De Ruyter attacked the combined Anglo-French fleet at the Battle of Solebay; both sides lost one ship each, but it ended significant naval operations for the year.

His unexpected success proved a mixed blessing for Louis, since it distracted from the main objectives of capturing the Spanish Netherlands. The possibility of France controlling the Republic, the largest commercial power in Europe, brought the Dutch support from Emperor Leopold and Spain among others. It also increased opposition in England, where many had opposed an alliance with Catholic France from the start. Peace negotiations made little progress; an over-confident Louis made demands unacceptable even to his English allies, while the Dutch used the opportunity to acquire allies and rebuild their army. By the end of 1672, they had regained much of the territory lost in May; Charles had run out of money and Parliament was unwilling to provide further financing.

=== French success: May to June ===
Map of the Netherlands (Dutch Republic and Spanish) and surrounding areas during the French invasion and occupation of 1672

The speed with which the Republic was over-run in 1672 means it is still referred to as the Rampjaar or 'Year of disaster'. On 7 May, a French army of around 80,000 entered Liège; accompanied by Louis, they bypassed the Dutch stronghold of Maastricht, crossed the Meuse and besieged the Dutch-held Rhine fortress towns of Rheinberg, Orsoy, Buderich and Wesel. The last of these surrendered on 9 June, while troops from Münster and Cologne simultaneously entered the provinces of Overijssel and Gelderland.

On 12 June, the French crossed the Lower Rhine into the Betuwe near Schenkenschans and, recrossing the Lower Rhine to outflank the IJssel Line, occupied Arnhem on 16 June and Zutphen on 25 June. Now in danger of being cut off from the core province of Holland, William and his troops retreated through Utrecht behind the Holland Water Line; the inundations were released on 22 June, stopping the French advance in this area. On 5 July, Overijssel surrendered to Bernhard von Galen, Prince-Bishop of Münster, who occupied Drenthe; he reached Groningen, but flooding prevented a proper siege and his troops were soon starving.

The States General had responded to the March attack on the Smyrna convoy by expanding the active fleet from forty-eight to sixty vessels and ordering the construction of thirty-six new vessels. This still left them outnumbered by the combined Anglo-French fleet, and De Ruyter withdrew into shoal waters near the Dutch coast, awaiting an opportunity. Disasters on land meant De Witt needed a victory; he ordered De Ruyter to attack, accompanied by Cornelis de Witt to ensure these instructions were carried out.

When the Allied fleet withdrew to Solebay near Southwold, Suffolk, to resupply, on 7 June De Ruyter surprised it at the Battle of Solebay. The Duke of York led his squadrons against the main Dutch fleet, but his French colleague d'Estrées either misunderstood his intentions or deliberately ignored them, sailing in the opposite direction. The thirty French ships fought a separate encounter at long-range with fifteen ships from the Admiralty of Zeeland, under Adriaen Banckert. D'Estrées was later condemned by some of his own officers for failing to engage them more closely.

Solebay, 7 June; the destruction of the Royal James, the English flagship

The Earl of Sandwich was killed when the Royal James was sunk by fireships, with other ships suffering heavy damage. Although ship losses were roughly equal, Solebay ensured the Dutch retained control of their coastal waters, secured their trade routes and ended hopes of an Anglo-French landing in Zeeland. Anger at the alleged lack of support from D'Estrées increased opposition to the war, and Parliament was reluctant to approve funds for essential repairs. For the rest of the year, this restricted English naval operations to a failed attack on the Dutch East India Company Return Fleet.

However, this did not offset the damage caused by Dutch defeats on land, and it was impossible to hide the gravity of the crisis. A stream of venomous Orangist pamphlets accused the De Witt brothers in particular and the Regent regime in general of betraying the country to the French. There was widespread rioting, with Orangists seizing control of city councils and demanding William take over government. On 22 June, Johan de Witt was badly wounded in an assassination attempt; one of the attackers, Jacob van der Graaf, was quickly arrested, tried and executed, increasing popular anger with the De Witts.

=== Negotiations ===
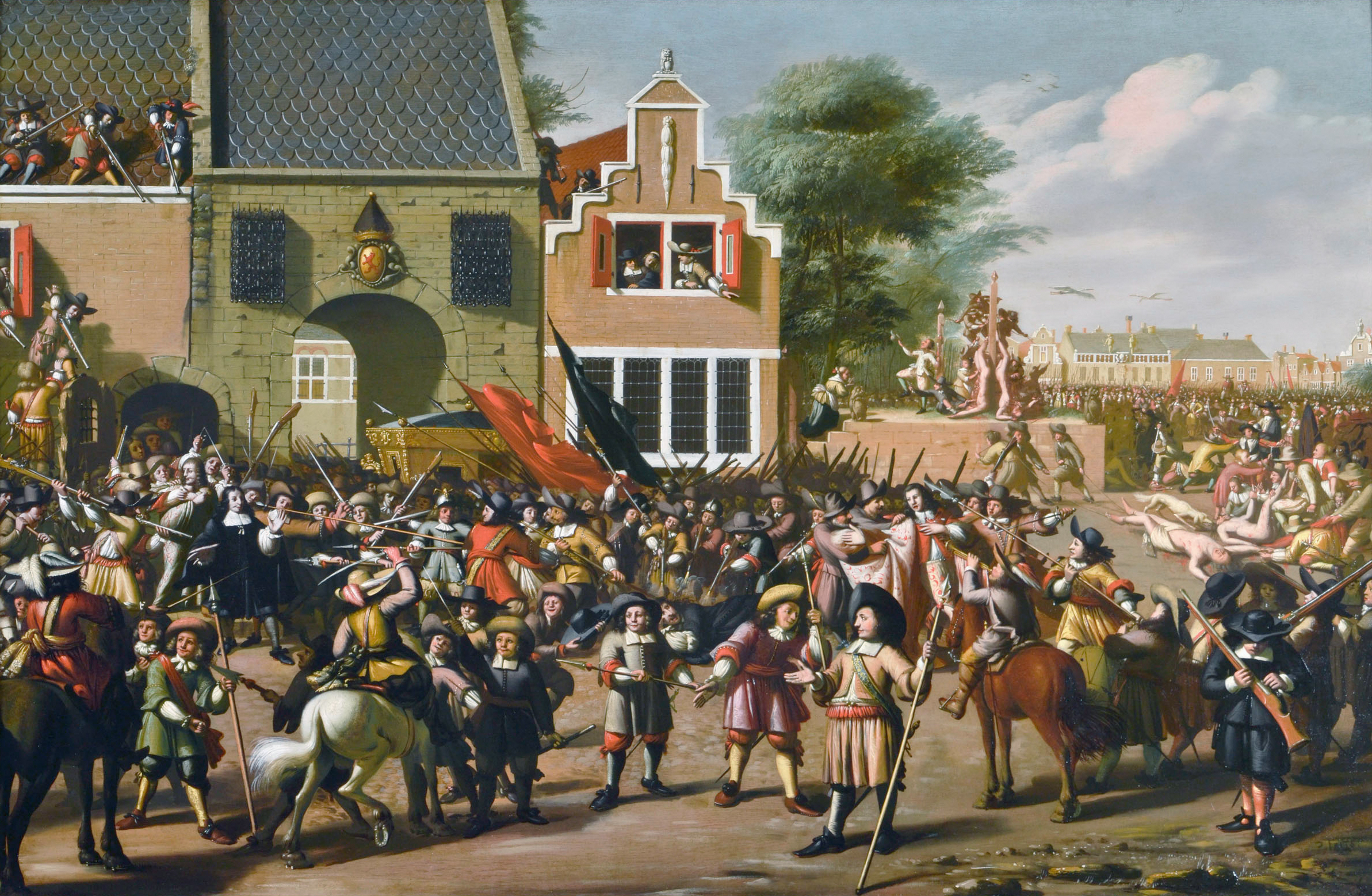
The murder of the De Witt brothers secured William's domestic position.

The Dutch were helped by the incompatibility of French and English objectives, while initial success meant Louis over-estimated the strength of his position. French expansion in the Spanish Netherlands was primarily intended to grow their economy at the expense of the Dutch, but undermined English trade and security as well. If Louis also gained control of Holland, the financial and commercial centre of Europe, the potential increase in French influence threatened every other European state.

On 14 June, the States of Holland opened negotiations, offering Louis the right to occupy key fortresses in the south, plus an indemnity of ten million guilders. He responded with additional demands including religious freedom for Catholics, or French sovereignty over Utrecht and Guelders. Both sides were using talks as a delaying tactic, assuming their position would improve; Louis knew the envoys were not authorised to negotiate on religion or the territorial integrity of the provinces and would have to request further instructions. The English were to be ceded Delfzijl, in Groningen, already besieged by Münster.

Arguing only Charles could save them from the French, Orangist pressure led to his nephew William's appointment as stadtholder of Holland on 4 July. Hoping for a quick win, Charles sent Arlington and Buckingham to Brill, accompanied by Orangist exiles who had fled the Republic after their failed coup in 1666. They arrived at William's headquarters in Nieuwerbrug on 5 July, cheered by crowds who believed they brought promises of English support. The mood quickly changed when their terms were made public. France and Münster were to retain their conquests and William would be appointed Sovereign Prince of Holland, in return for which he would pay England ten million guilders, £10,000 per annum for North Sea herring rights, and allow English garrisons to occupy Brill, Sluys and Vlissingen. (Note: During the Eighty Years War in 1585, the Dutch ceded control of Brill and Flushing (Vlissingen) to Elizabeth I; known as the Cautionary Towns, they were sold back to the Dutch in 1616 by James I for £213,000)

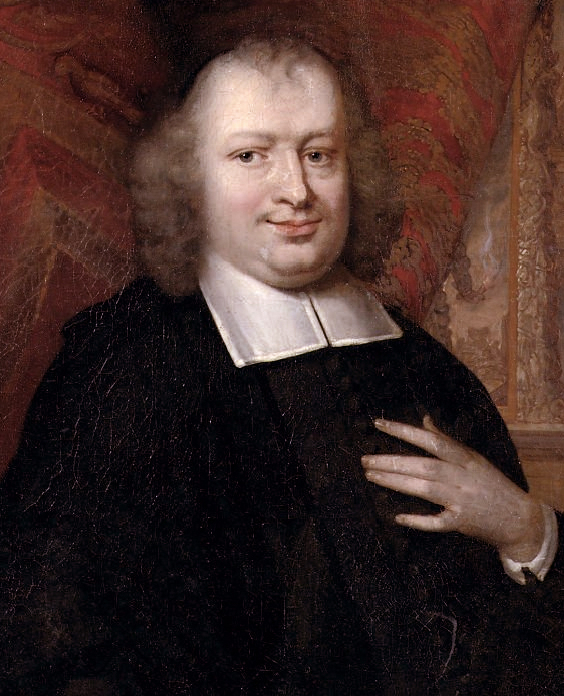
Orangist Gaspar Fagel, appointed Grand Pensionary in August 1672

William rejected the offer, since it gave the Dutch nothing they did not already hold. Arlington and Buckingham then met with Louis and agreed the Heeswijk Accord on 16 July. This set out a list of shared demands and undertook not to conclude a separate peace, but neither side placed any reliance on it. Leopold's envoy in the Hague, François-Paul de Lisola, gave the States-General assurances of Imperial support and arranged for Spanish troops to hold the Dutch fortress cities of 's-Hertogenbosch and Breda, releasing their garrisons for the field army.

A second letter from Charles on 18 July urged William to accept his terms, claiming the De Witts were the only obstacle to peace. He responded by offering fishing rights, £400,000, Sluys and Surinam, in return for recognition as Prince of Holland and England agreeing a separate peace. Based on the Heeswijk Accord, Louis demanded the Dutch cede their naval base at Hellevoetsluis to England, a demand he knew was unacceptable. After the terms were rejected on 20 July, Arlington and Buckingham returned to London.

Johan de Witt had resigned as Grand Pensionary in June, while Cornelis was arrested for allegedly plotting to murder William. On 15 August, Charles' letter blaming the De Witts was published in Holland; the effect was to inflame tensions and the two brothers were lynched by an Orangist civil militia on 20th. The Orangist Gaspar Fagel became Grand Pensionary, and on 27 August the States of Holland banned their political opponents from a local office, securing William's political position.

=== Dutch recovery: July to December ===
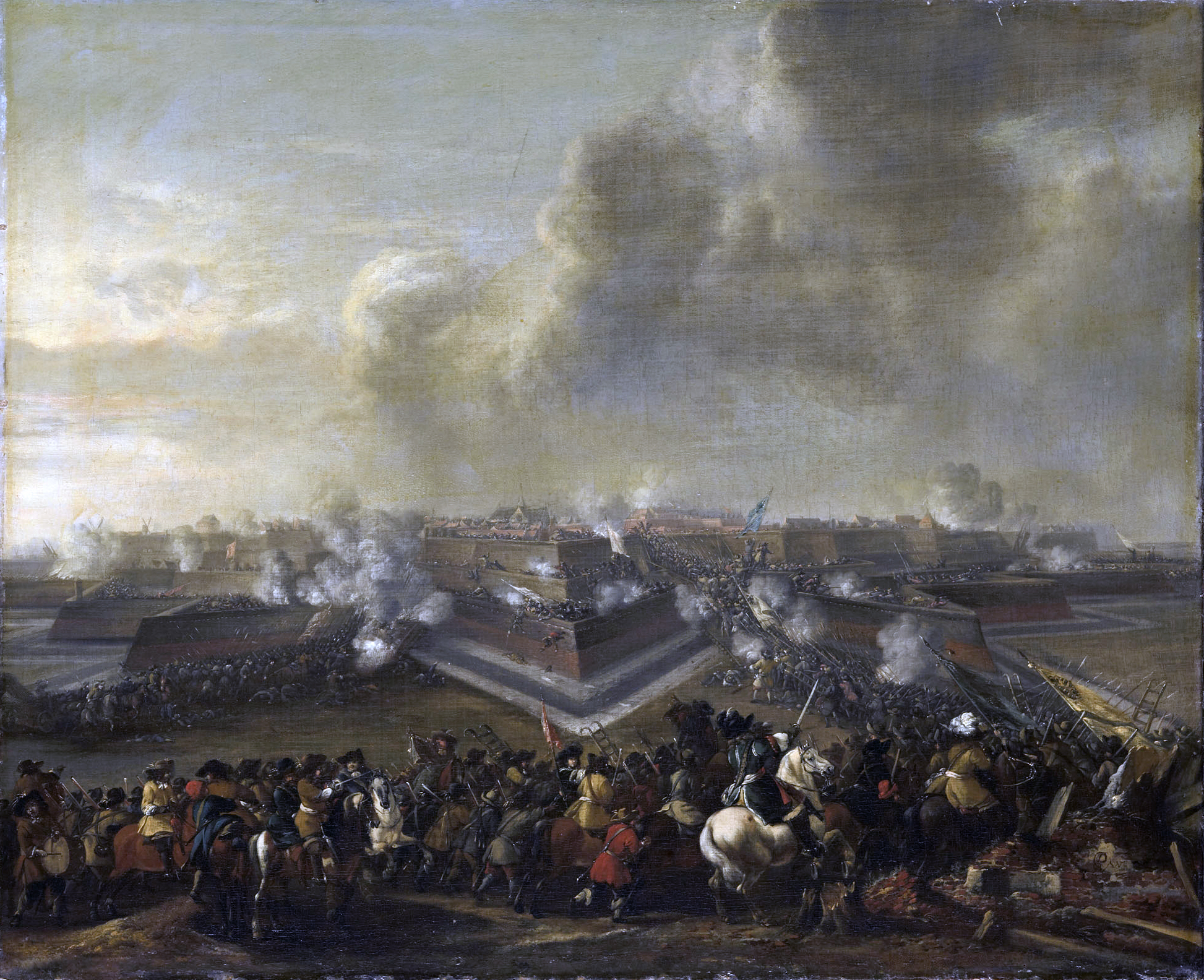
The recapture of Coevorden on 30 December 1672 was a significant boost to Dutch morale.

On 7 July, the inundations were fully set; their effectiveness would be reduced when the waters froze in winter but for now, Holland was secure from French advance. This gave the States time to enact the military reforms approved on 16 July, while they were boosted by the return of 20,000 prisoners ransomed from the French. In addition to unofficial Spanish support, on 25 July Leopold promised to invade the Rhineland and Alsace with 16,000 troops, along with the 20,000 promised by Frederick William in May.

This forced Louis to divert 40,000 men to meet this threat, with nearly 50,000 tied up in garrisons around the Republic. English hopes of a quick victory vanished after Solebay, while the removal of the De Witts secured William's position and ended his dependence on Charles. The Münster army disintegrated due to lack of supplies and on 27 August, von Galen abandoned the siege of Groningen; the besiegers lost over 11,000 men, including 6,000 deserters, many of whom joined the Dutch.

William led attacks on Woerden and Charleroi, which were over-ambitious and unsuccessful but restored Dutch morale, while Coevorden was recaptured on 31 December. Although their position remained precarious, by the end of 1672 the Dutch had regained much of the territory lost in May and Louis found himself involved in a wider European war of attrition. Despite his French subsidies, Charles had run out of money and faced considerable domestic opposition to continuing the war. This increased when the Dutch Cape Colony dispatched an expeditionary force to the English-held island of Saint Helena, and took possession on behalf of the Dutch East India Company.

== 1673 ==
=== Overview ===
After the French failed to breach the Holland Water Line, the Anglo-French fleet was tasked with defeating the Dutch navy, allowing them to blockade the Dutch coast and threaten the Republic with starvation, or land an invasion force. However, poor co-ordination meant they failed to exploit their numerical advantage, and De Ruyter was able to prevent his fleet being overwhelmed. Although the Battle of Texel on 21 August was inconclusive, it was a strategic Dutch victory as the damage inflicted on the English fleet forced them to return home for repairs.

Never popular to begin with, English support for the war dissolved along with hopes for a quick victory. In late 1673, the French withdrew from the Republic, and focused on conquering the Spanish Netherlands, a frightening prospect for most English politicians. Combined with a Dutch pamphlet campaign claiming Charles had agreed to restore Catholicism, Parliament refused to fund the war, while the level of opposition made Charles fear for his own position. In February 1674, the Second Peace of Westminster ended the war; it was greeted with popular enthusiasm in both countries, not least by commercial interests in Amsterdam and London, and the treaty was ratified with exceptional speed.

=== Naval battles ===
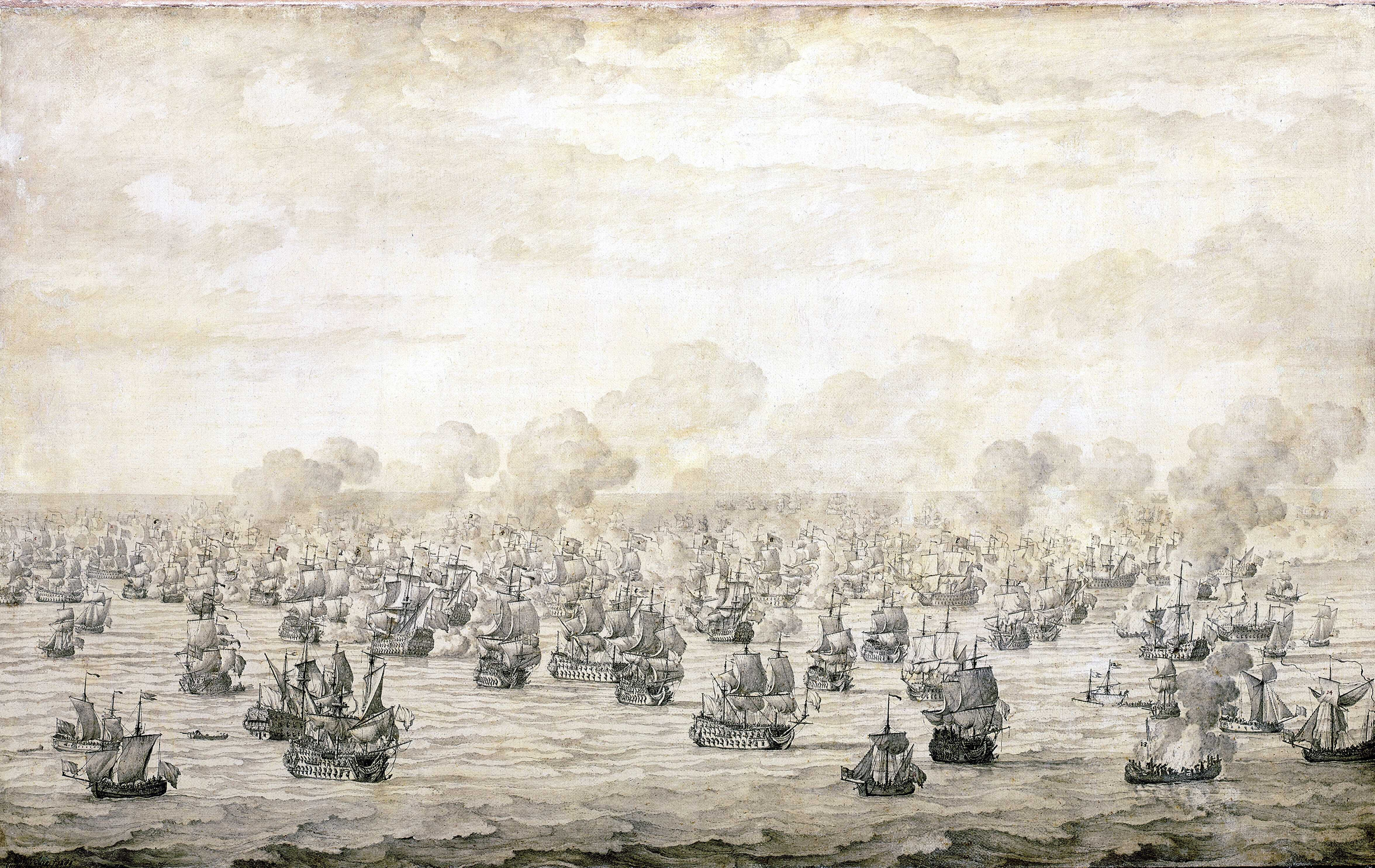
Battle of Schooneveld by Van de Velde the Elder

In the first two wars, both navies, particularly the Dutch, employed aggressive tactics that often resulted in heavy ship losses for the defeated side. In the Third Anglo-Dutch War, the priority was to minimise losses, and it was common for fleets to engage using the "line-ahead" formation, an essentially defensive approach; despite inflicting considerable damage, neither side lost any ships at the Texel.

When the Water Line froze during the winter of 1673, the French were unable to break it, thwarted by thin ice and companies of Dutch sailors equipped with ice skates, under Johan de Liefde. Attempts in the spring to drain the northern part of the line or cross on rafts also proved unsuccessful. With an eastern approach impractical, the Royal Navy was ordered to blockade the coast in co-operation with a French squadron; if possible, they were to land an invasion force, although how this would be accomplished was unclear. Lacking experience of amphibious operations, this meant capturing a Dutch port, despite limited knowledge of the dangerous shoals protecting their approaches.

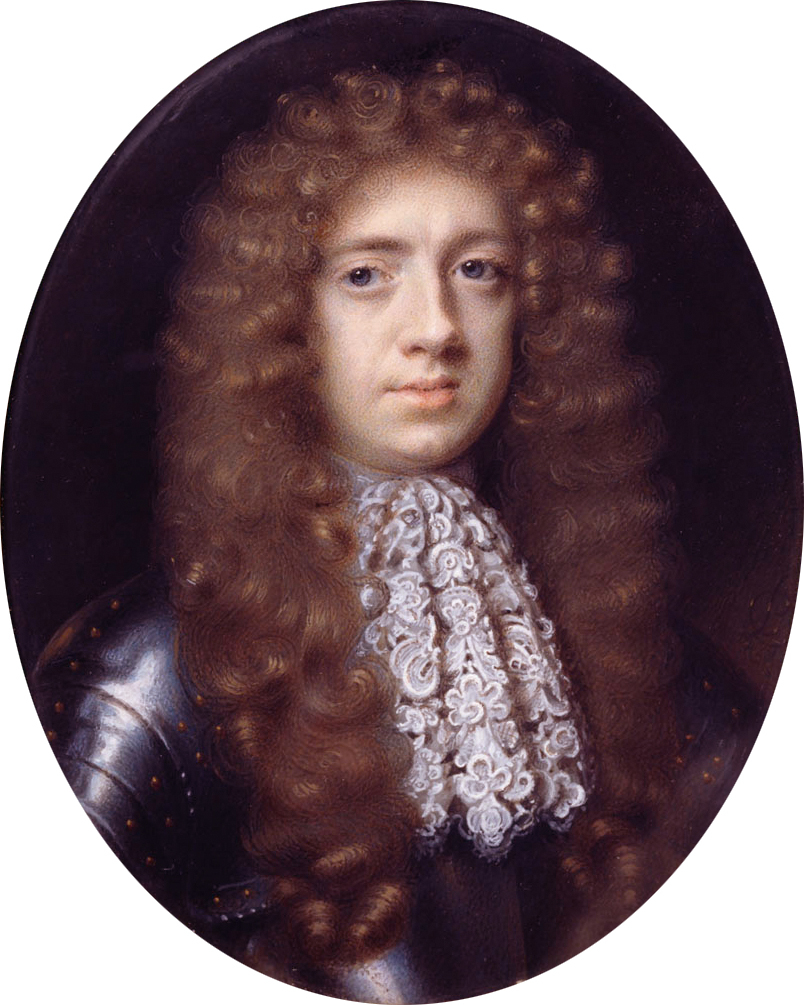
Sir Edward Spragge, killed at the Battle of Texel

Hoping to unnerve the Dutch, Prince Rupert leaked information claiming his fleet was accompanied by ships carrying an invasion force; in reality, it remained in Great Yarmouth, and was in any case insufficient for the task. In May, the English fleet of 81 ships approached the Dutch coast, while De Ruyter's 55 ships took up a defensive position in the Schooneveld. Early on 7 June, Prince Rupert detached a light squadron, hoping to tempt De Ruyter into battle where the Allies could use their superior numbers. The alternative was forcing the Dutch fleet into Hellevoetsluis, where they could be blockaded while transports brought troops over to assault Den Briel or Vlissingen.

However, De Ruyter's speed of response allowed him to attack before the main Allied fleet was ready, launching the First Battle of the Schooneveld. At Solebay the previous year, the French squadron had sailed in the opposite direction to that of the English; to counter accusations this had been deliberate, they now formed the centre squadron. However, their inexperience and poor positioning left gaps which allowed De Ruyter to sail through the Allied centre.

The French commanders had been ordered by Louis not to risk their ships, but focus on learning from the English and Dutch. They therefore disengaged, later writing enthusiastic reports about the tactical genius of the manoeuvre used by De Ruyter. Their defection threatened to cut off the Allied rear under Sir Edward Spragge; he took his own squadron to attack Tromp, who was also being engaged by Rupert, but fear of running aground meant this was not done with any conviction. Now split into four parts and in considerable confusion, the Allies withdrew after nine hours of fighting; they were not pursued, since De Ruyter decided not to take any unnecessary risks.

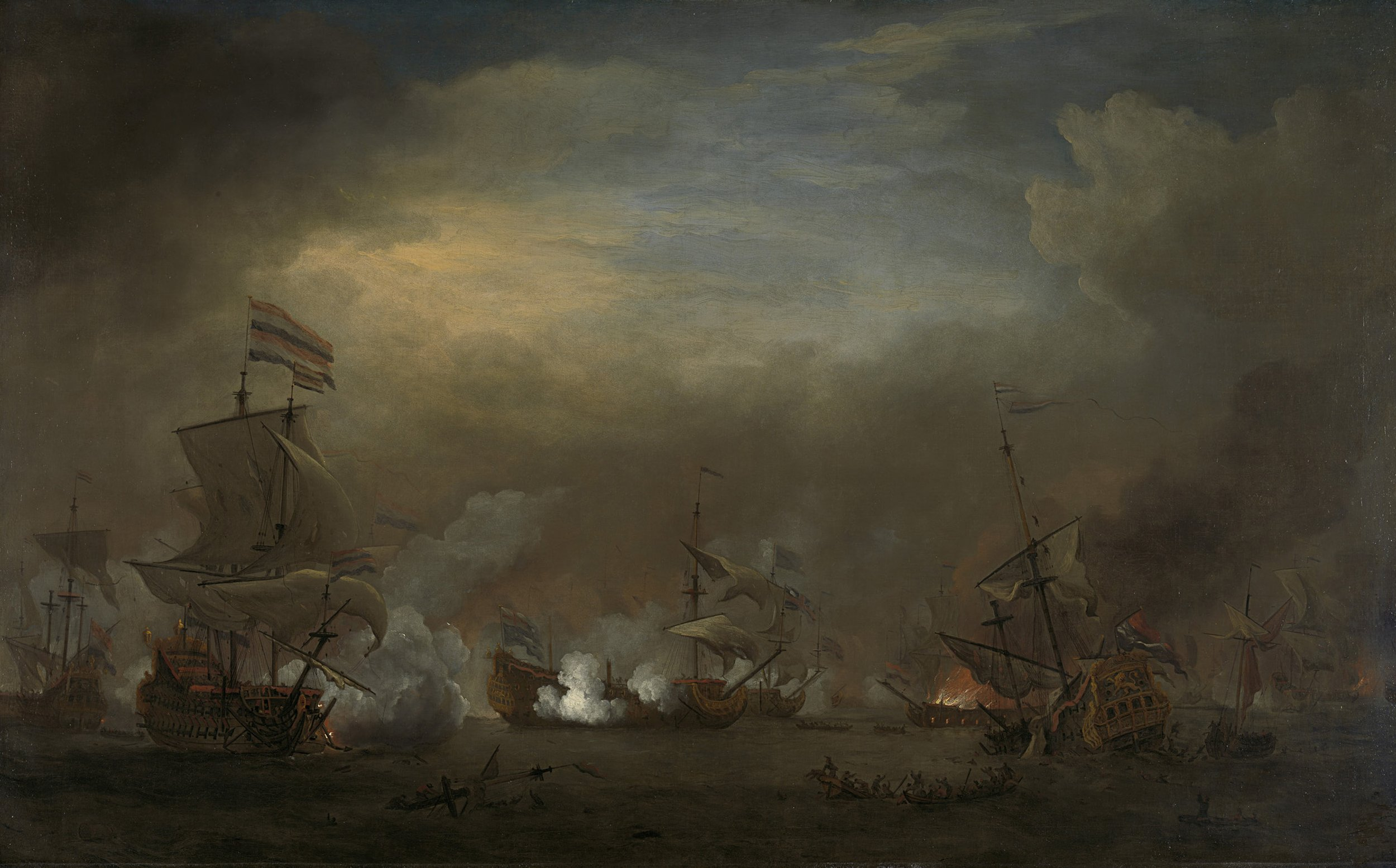
The Battle of Texel by Willem van de Velde the Younger, an accurate portrayal of the smoke-obscured nature of sea battles of this era, giving an almost nocturnal effect.

The Allies continued to hold their position off the Dutch coast; on 14 June, De Ruyter took advantage of favourable winds and launched the Second Battle of the Schooneveld. Once again, this caused chaos in the unprepared Allied fleet, which suffered severe damage and returned to the Thames for repairs. In late July, Rupert put to sea again, hoping to draw the Dutch north by feinting against The Hague or Den Helder; although De Ruyter preferred to remain where he was, he was ordered out to escort a valuable incoming Dutch East India Company treasure fleet. While both sides suffered severe damage in the resulting Battle of Texel, Prince Rupert was forced to return home for repairs.

The conduct of the French led to widespread recriminations and accusations they had failed to support their English colleagues. Whether this was fair remains a matter of dispute; in all three battles, De Ruyter took advantage of Allied deficiencies in fighting instructions and signalling. Regardless, it deepened suspicions between the English and French, further undercutting popular support for the war, while ending any hopes of starving the Dutch through a naval blockade. The result was an overwhelming strategic victory for the Dutch. even though four ships of the Spice Fleet had fallen into Allied hands. For De Ruyter, the successful campaign, by repelling attacks by much superior fleets to save his homeland, had been the highlight of his career, as the English readily acknowledged: the Duke of York concluded that among admirals, "he was the greatest that ever to that time was in the world". The English had to abandon their plans for an invasion from the sea, and the large costs of repair troubled Parliament.

On 24 August 1673, the Dutch recaptured the city New Amsterdam (renamed "New York" by the English) under Admiral Cornelis Evertsen the Youngest and Captain Anthony Colve. Evertsen renamed the city "New Orange". However, Dutch rule ended on 10 November 1674 with the order to implement the provisions of the Treaty of Westminster.

=== Anti-war sentiment in England ===
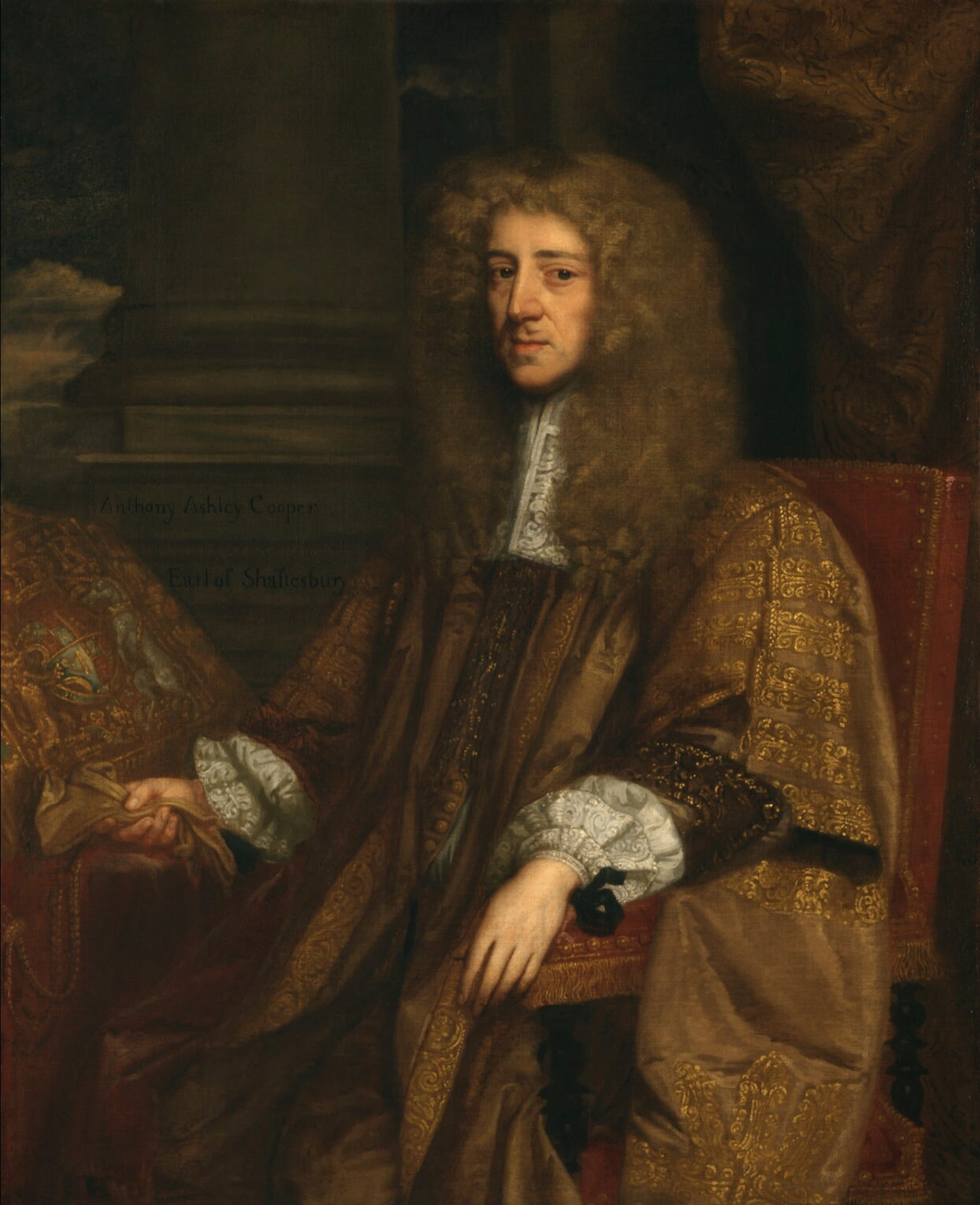
Anthony Ashley Cooper, who led opposition to the war

In previous conflicts, investing in privateers had been very profitable for the English, but from 1672 to 1673 Dutch raiders captured over 2,800 French and English ships, far more than their counterparts. The province of Zealand alone operated 120 privateers. Having failed to blockade the Dutch coast, English merchants were excluded from the vital Baltic trade in shipbuilding materials. In addition, the Dutch re-capture of New Amsterdam and attacks on English possessions in India caused further commercial damage. These losses compounded existing doubts about the war, which many felt was unjustified.

Stabilising their military position also restored Dutch credit, allowing the Estates to expand the military budget to a hundred million guilders, three times annual tax revenues. Louis had attacked the Republic hoping for a quick victory; once this failed, he faced a war of attrition on multiple fronts. In July 1673, French troops captured Maastricht; on 30 August, the Dutch agreed the Alliance of the Hague with Leopold and Spain. In October, they were joined by Charles IV, Duke of Lorraine, whose duchy was occupied by France, forming the Quadruple Alliance.

William made sure the peace negotiations held in Cologne with France and England failed. In September, he recaptured Naarden, Münster and Cologne made peace, and French troops withdrew from the Dutch Republic, retaining only Grave and Maastricht. With victory over the Dutch now unlikely, the war became one for control of Flanders, an issue that divided England and France. Tensions between the two increased when Arlington's former secretary Peter du Moulin fled to the Republic in early 1673. He started a propaganda campaign, flooding England with pamphlets accusing Charles and Louis of conspiring to make the country Catholic again.

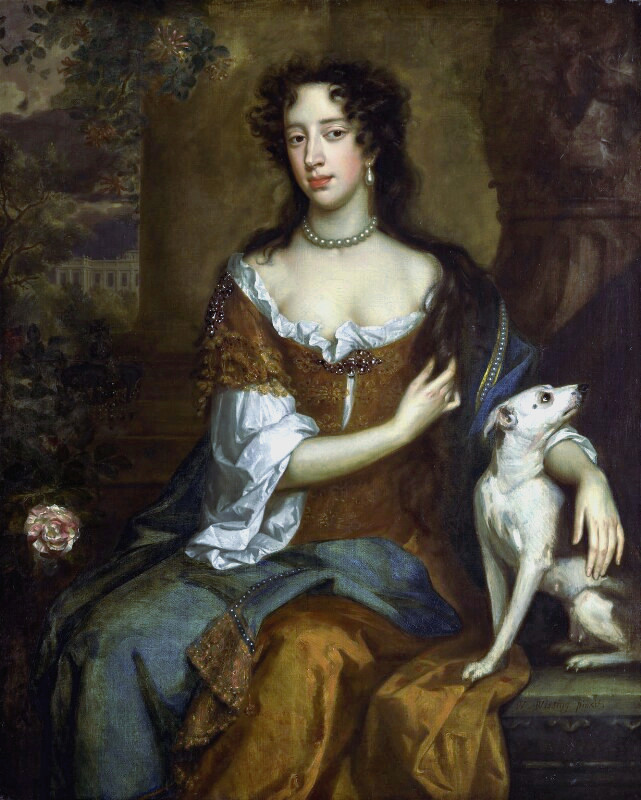
Mary of Modena; her marriage to James increased opposition to the war

Many were convinced of its truth, particularly when Charles gave permission for his brother and heir James to marry Mary of Modena, a devout Catholic. In February 1673, Parliament refused to approve further taxes unless Charles withdrew his proposed Indulgence and accepted a Test Act barring Catholics from public office. In June 1673, James resigned as Lord High Admiral, which was seen as confirmation of rumours he had secretly become a Catholic and could not comply with the Test Act. As Charles had no legitimate offspring, James' marriage now presented the strong prospect of a Catholic dynasty ruling England in the future.

Buckingham, who learned of the secret provisions of the Treaty of Dover the previous year, reacted to the changed public mood by leaking them to other politicians, including Arlington. As a result, the Cabal ministry joined those advocating peace with the Dutch; shocked by the revelation of Charles' agreement with Louis, Lord Shaftesbury began to consider removing the House of Stuart entirely. With his backing, John Locke developed the legal concepts that appeared in his work the Two Treatises of Government, a general denunciation of absolute monarchy.

== Second Peace of Westminster ==
In this situation Charles felt that continuing the alliance was a grave threat to his personal position and that Parliament would no longer fund a war. He informed the French ambassador Colbert de Croissy that to his regret, he had to terminate the English war effort. He told the Dutch via the Spanish consul in London, the Marquess del Fresno, that, his main war aim to install his noble nephew as stadtholder having been attained, he no longer objected to concluding a lasting peace between the two Protestant brother nations, if only some minor "indemnities" could be paid. At first the States of Holland were disinclined to grant Charles's demands: as England had accomplished nothing in the war, it was, in their opinion, not entitled to any reward. But William convinced them that there was some chance of bringing Charles into the war against France eventually. Furthermore, Spain had not yet declared war on France and was willing to do so only if England made peace, because it feared English attacks on its American colonies.

After a short exchange of proposals by means of trumpeters, the Treaty of Westminster was publicly proclaimed in London on 17 February Old Style. It was approved by the States of Holland and West Frisia on 4 March (New Style), and ratified by the States General on 5 March.

The treaty stipulated that New York—formerly New Netherland—would henceforth be an English possession and that Suriname, captured by the Dutch in 1667, would remain their colony, confirming the status quo of 1667. An "indemnity" of two million guilders was to be paid by the Dutch. Eventually, William would force Charles to set off these indemnities against the debts he owed to the House of Orange, so the English king actually received very little.

Despite the peace, Monmouth's brigade would not be withdrawn from the French army and it would be allowed to recruit in Britain until the end of the Franco-Dutch War. In April that year, William attempted to convince his uncle to enter the war against Louis but failed. Until the end of the War of Holland in 1678, Charles tried to negotiate between the two parties, at times pretending to consider a conflict with France, when such pretence was beneficial to him. In 1677, he forced his niece Mary to marry William; this would later prove to be a fundamental cause of the fall of his brother in 1688.

== Bibliography ==
- Boxer, C. R. (1969). "Some Second Thoughts on the Third Anglo-Dutch War, 1672–1674". Transactions of the Royal Historical Society. 19: 67–94. doi:10.2307/3678740. JSTOR 3678740. S2CID 159934682.
- Bruce, R. Stuart (1914). Johnston, Alfred W.; Johnston, Amy (eds.). "Part III – Replies – Naval Engagement, Rønis Vo, Shetland" (PDF). Old-Lore Miscellany of Orkney Shetland Caithness and Sutherland. VII (Old-Lore Series Vol. VIII). London: Viking Society for Northern Research: 101–103. Archived (PDF) from the original on 9 October 2022 – via Viking Society Web Publications.
- Childs, John (1984). "The British Brigade in France". History. 69 (227).
- Childs, John (2014). General Percy Kirke and the later Stuart Army. Bloomsbury Academic. ISBN 978-1441158826.
- Clodfelter, Micheal (1992). Warfare and Armed Conflicts: A Statistical Reference to Casualty and Other Figures, 1500–2000. McFarland & Co. ISBN 978-0786474707.
- Davies, J. D. (2008). Pepys s Navy: Ships, Men and Warfare 1649–1689. Pen and Sword. ISBN 978-1783830220.
- Davies, J. D. (2017). Kings of the Sea: Charles II, James II and the Royal Navy. Barnsley: Seaforth Publishing. ISBN 978-1-84832-400-8.
- Degroot, Dagomar (2018). The Frigid Golden Age. Cambridge University Press. ISBN 978-1108419314.
- Doedens, Anne; Mulder, Liek (2016). Engels Nederlandse Oorlogen: Door een zee van bloed in de Gouden Eeuw (in Dutch). Walburg Pers. ISBN 978-9462491052.
- Edwards, Elizabeth Clare (1998). Amsterdam & William III: the role of influence, interest and patronage on policy-making in the Dutch Republic, 1672–1684 (PDF). University College London. Archived (PDF) from the original on 9 October 2022.
- Frost, Robert (2000). The Northern Wars; State and Society in Northeastern Europe 1558–1721. Routledge. ISBN 978-0582064294.
- Geyl, Pieter (1936). The Netherlands in the 17th Century 1609–1648 (1989 ed.). Routledge. ISBN 978-0304317813.
- Goldie, M.; Levillain, Charles-Edouard (2018). "Francois-Paul de Lisola and English Opposition to Louis XIV". Historical Journal. doi:10.17863/CAM.35128.
- Grose, Clyde L. (1929). "Louis XIV's Financial Relations with Charles II and the English Parliament". The Journal of Modern History. 1 (2): 177–204. doi:10.1086/235450. JSTOR 1872003. S2CID 144216886.
- Hainsworth, D. R.; Churches, C. (1998). The Anglo-Dutch Naval Wars, 1652–1674. Sutton. ISBN 978-0750917872.
- Hemingway, James Peter (2002). A comparative study of naval architecture between 1672 and 1755 (PDF) (PhD). University of Bristol. Archived (PDF) from the original on 9 October 2022.
- Holmes, Richard (2008). Marlborough: England's Fragile Genius. Harper Press. ISBN 978-0007225712.
- Hutton, Ronald (1989). Charles II: King of England, Scotland and Ireland. Clarendon Press. ISBN 978-0198229117.
- Hutton, R. (1986). "The Making of the Secret Treaty of Dover, 1668–1670". The Historical Journal. 29 (2): 297–318. doi:10.1017/S0018246X00018756. JSTOR 2639064. S2CID 159787254.
- Israel, Jonathan (1990). Dutch Primacy in World Trade, 1585–1740. Oxford University Press. ISBN 978-0198211396.
- Jackson, Clare (2021). Devil Land; England under Siege 1588–1688. Allen Lane. ISBN 978-0241285817.
- Jenkins, E. H. (1973). A History of the French Navy. MacDonald and Jane's. ISBN 978-0786457847.
- Jones, J.R. (2013). The Anglo-Dutch Wars of the Seventeenth Century. Routledge. ISBN 978-1315845975.
- Kenyon, J.P. (1993). The History Men. The Historical Profession in England since the Renaissance. Weidenfeld and Nicolson. ISBN 978-0582056299.
- Kitson, Frank (1999). Prince Rupert: Admiral and General-at-Sea. Constable. ISBN 978-0094798502.
- Laslett, Peter (1960). Two Treatises of Government. A critical edition with an introduction and apparatus critics. Cambridge University Press.
- Lesaffer, Randall. "The Wars of Louis XIV in Treaties (Part III): The Secret Alliance of Dover (1 June 1670)". OPIL.
- Lynn, John (1996). The Wars of Louis XIV, 1667–1714 (Modern Wars in Perspective). Longman. ISBN 978-0582056299.
- Palmer, M. (1997). "The "Military Revolution" Afloat: The Era of the Anglo-Dutch Wars and the Transition to Modern Warfare at Sea". War in History. 4 (2): 123–149. doi:10.1177/096834459700400201. JSTOR 26004420. S2CID 159657621.
- Ogg, D. (1934). England in the Reign of Charles II. Oxford University Press. OCLC 490944369.
- Panhuysen, Luc (2005). De Ware Vrijheid: De levens van Johan en Cornelis de Witt (in Dutch). Uitgeverij Atlas.
- Panhuysen, Luc (2009). Rampjaar 1672: Hoe de Republiek aan de ondergang ontsnapte. Uitgeverij Atlas. ISBN 978-9045013282.
- Panhuysen, Luc (2016). Oranje tegen de Zonnekoning: De strijd van Willem III en Lodewijk XIV om Europa. De Arbeiderspers. ISBN 978-9029538718.
- Prud'homme van Reine, Ronald (2015). Rechterhand van Nederland: Biografie van Michiel Adriaenszoon de Ruyter (in Dutch). Atlas Contact. ISBN 978-9045023298.
- Rodger, N. A. M. (2004). The Command of the Ocean: A Naval History of Britain, 1649–1815. Penguin. ISBN 9780713994117.
- Romelse, Gijs (2010). "The role of mercantilism in Anglo-Dutch political relations, 1650–1674". The Economic History Review. 63 (3): 591–611. doi:10.1111/j.1468-0289.2009.00491.x. JSTOR 40929818. S2CID 145077506.
- Rothbard, Murray (2010). "Mercantilism as the Economic Side of Absolutism". mises.org.
- Rowen, Herbert H. (1980). John de Witt, Grand Pensionary of Holland, 1625–1672 (2016 ed.). Princeton University Press. ISBN 978-0691630366.
- Rowen, Henry Herbert (1978). John de Witt, Grand Pensionary of Holland, 1625–1672 (2015 ed.). Princeton University Press. ISBN 978-0691600437.
- Rowen, Herbert H. (1954). "John De Witt and the Triple Alliance". The Journal of Modern History. 26 (1): 1–14. doi:10.1086/237659. JSTOR 1874869. S2CID 145695238.
- Shomette, Donald G.; Haslach, Robert D. (2002). Raid on America: The Dutch Naval Campaign of 1672–1674. University of South Carolina Press. ISBN 0788422456.
- Theal, G.M. (1888). History of South Africa 1486–1691. London.
- 't Hart, Marjolein (2014). The Dutch Wars of Independence: Warfare and Commerce in the Netherlands 1570–1680 (Modern Wars in Perspective). Routledge. ISBN 978-0415734226.
- Troost, W. (2001). Stadhouder-koning Willem III: Een politieke biografie (in Dutch). Hilversum: Uitgeverij Verloren. ISBN 906550639X.
- Troost, Wouter (2005). William III the Stadholder-king: A Political Biography. Routledge. ISBN 978-0754650713.
- Van Nimwegen, Olaf (2010). The Dutch Army and the Military Revolutions, 1588–1688. Boydell Press. ISBN 978-1843835752.
- Young, William (2004). International Politics and Warfare in the Age of Louis XIV and Peter the Great: A Guide to the Historical Literature. iUniverse. ISBN 978-0595813988.
- Zwitzer, H. L. (1990). "British and Netherlands Armies in Relation to the Anglo-Dutch Alliance". Navies and Armies. Donald. ISBN 978-0859762922.
