= List of ships of the line of the Dutch Republic =

This is a list of Dutch (the United Provinces of the Netherlands) ships of the line, or sailing warships which formed the Dutch battlefleet. It covers ships built from about 1623 (there are few reliable records of individual earlier warships) until the creation of the Kingdom of the Netherlands in March 1815, including the period of the French-controlled Batavian Republic, nominal Kingdom of Holland and direct French annexation between 1795 and 1813. It excludes frigates and lesser warships.

The Dutch were often handicapped by the smaller size of their ships relative to the vessels of other nations, particularly those of England and France. This was partly due to the shallow home waters of the Netherlands, which limited the maximum draft that ships could operate. Consequently, the Dutch did not build large three-deckers such as were found in the navies of England and France, except for a brief period from 1682 to 1695 (and a very few much later on during the Napoleonic era). However, during the period up to 1650 the Dutch made up in sheer quantity of ships for what they lacked in terms of the size of vessels; the list below is incomplete and does not include some of the many hundreds of Dutch warships belonging to the United Provinces between 1579 (when the Netherlands effectively became independent from Spanish control) and 1795 (in which latter year the French invaded and established the puppet state of the Batavian Republic).

== The Five Admiralties ==
Administratively and politically, until 1795 there was not a single Dutch Navy but five distinct Admiralties. In the south was the Admiralty of Zeeland covering the Province of Zeeland (indicated by "(Z)" preceding a ship's name in the list below). Next were three covering the Province of Holland - the Admiralty of the Maas (or "Maze") in the south of Holland, centred on Rotterdam (indicated by "(M)"), the Admiralty of Amsterdam in the centre of the Province (indicated by "(A)"), and the Admiralty of the Noorderkwartier in the north of Holland (indicated by "(N)"). The fifth was the Admiralty of Friesland covering the Province of Friesland (indicated by "(F)"), albeit with fewer ships than the other four Admiralties.

Each Dutch warship belonged exclusively to one or other of the five Admiralties, although in the 17th century the Dutch fleet included many ships of mercantile ownership, particularly those belonging to the Dutch East India Company or Vereenigde Oostindische Compagnie (VOC) and sometimes the Dutch West Indies Company or Geoctroyeerde Westindische Compagnie (WIC), which were hired by the Admiralties to supplement their own vessels. The names of Dutch warships were often common to several Admiralties, so that there were vessels bearing the same name in different Admiralties at the same time.

Armament was often changed, so the number of guns mounted in any ship frequently varied from year to year. During the 1650 - 1680 period, many Dutch ships of the line were "up-gunned", ending with significantly more guns (or guns of larger calibres) than when they first came into service.

== The Dutch Rating System ==
Prior to 1632, the Dutch did not have a system of categorising vessels beyond a simple functional division into "ships" (i.e. ships of the line, as they became), "frigates" and lesser ship-rigged "three-mast yachts". On 11 March 1632, the Dutch government approved three standard designs (which they termed "charters") to which all new warships should be built. These set the requirement for low-built ships without castles, an uninterrupted deck, slim hulls and light construction; the three designs were of 100 (Amsterdam) feet, 120 feet and 128 feet length (measured on the uppermost continuous deck) respectively, and future charter divisions retained this classification by length rather than by tonnage or number of guns (as used by England and France). However, later in the 17th century, the Dutch moved towards using a Rating system similar (but not identical) to the English or French system, while retaining the terminology of "Charters" well into the 18th century. To provide flagships for the battlefleet, two two-decked ships were built in this period, both at Rotterdam for the Admiralty of the Maas - the Aemilia of 1632 and the Brederode of 1644; each was 144 (Amsterdam) feet in length and 35 feet in breadth.

The system coincided with the English categories of 1st to 4th Rates, i.e. they comprised the battlefleet units. In 1652 the Dutch - under pressure from their naval commander Maarten Tromp to build larger ships to combat the English - revised this rating system which was still based on a series of Charters, initially grading the battlefleet units by length of ship with classes of 130 (Amsterdam) feet, 136 feet and 140 feet; this was at a time when the largest ship in the Dutch navies measured 134 feet in length. Subsequently, having won the Battle of Dungeness in November 1652, Tromp persuaded the Staten-Generaal to add a further class of 150 feet ships as the "1st Charter", although only two of this length were built initially - the Eendracht and Groot Hollandia, both launched at Rotterdam for the Admiralty of the Maas in 1653 and 1654 respectively with 58 guns each.

Between 1652 and 1680 the "Charters" underwent drastic revision, but it was still more appropriate to classify ships of the line during this era by their (gundeck) length than by the number of guns carried. The lengths remained the basis of the Charters. By 1680, following the end of the later Anglo-Dutch Wars, the Staten-Generaal divided the warships of the five Admiralties into eight charters. The first four charters comprised the battlefleet, while the next three (5th to 7th Charters) covered frigates down to 20 guns, and the 8th Charter included smaller cruising warships. This article therefore refers only to ships of the first four Charters.

The 1st Charter comprised the largest two-deckers before 1680, together with 'partial' three-deckers (i.e. ships with only a partial battery on the third deck, without any guns in the waist), then subsequently covered the full three-deckers (for which see note below). These were ships carrying more than 70 guns, although this had risen to about 80 guns by 1670 and by 1680 to encompass ships of 90 guns or more. They generally (but not always) carried a mix of 36-pounder and 24-pounder guns on their primary (lower) gun deck, with lighter cannon (18-pounders and 12-pounders) on the upper deck and 6-pounders on their quarterdecks.

The other battlefleet Charters were all two-decked warships. By the 1670s the 2nd Charter were all two-decker warships with a number of guns initially around 60 to 74, although by 1680 the 60-gun and 64-gun ships had been relegated to the 3rd Charter. They usually carried 18-pounders (or a mixture of 24-pounders and 18-pounders) on the lower deck. The 3rd and 4th Charter ships usually carried 18-pounders or 12-pounders as their main battery. The 4th Charter ships by 1680 carried between 44 and 56 guns; by 1714 a minimum of 50 guns applied.

== Dimensions ==
All lengths quoted in this article are measured in Amsterdam feet, taken as the length of the uppermost continuous deck from stem to stern. The Amsterdam foot (Amsterdamse voet) was equivalent to 28.3133 cm, and thus equated to 0.9289 of an English foot, a factor to bear in mind in any comparisons. It was divided into eleven inches (Amsterdamse duim) equal to 2.57393 cm, compared with 2.54 cm for an English inch. Thus 150 Amsterdam feet equated to 139 ft 4 inches in English measurement. The Rotterdam foot was considerably longer - 31.39 cm (equal to almost 1.03 English feet) - and was divided into twelve inches, each of 2.615 cm. However in 1653 all the Admiralties adopted the Amsterdam foot, and this has been employed throughout this article except where otherwise stated.

== Tons ==
The system of weights was similarly united in the Netherlands, with the Amsterdam pound (pond) equal to 494.1 grams, compared with the English pound of 453.6 grams. Thus the Amsterdam pound (that all ordnance calibres are quoted below) was 8.93% greater than the English pound (e.g the Dutch "24-pounder" was equivalent to 26 lb 2.3 oz.

== Three-deckers ==
Most of the Dutch ships of the line, for reasons given above, were built with two decks of guns. However, in the 1660s four ships of the Amsterdam Admiralty were built which were structurally three-deckers (the Spiegel of 1663, followed by the Gouden Leeuw, Witte Olifant and Dolphijn of 1666), but these had only partially armed upper decks, with guns mounted forwards and aft (under the quarterdeck) but not in the waist at this level. From 1682 twenty complete three-deckers were built, the last in 1721; these comprised the 1st Charter issued on 15 February 1680, and provided for these to have dimensions of 170 (Amsterdam) feet on the gundeck (146 ft 3 in on the keel) x 43 feet x 16 ft. After these twenty, no further 1st Charter ships were built by the Netherlands.

== Ships of the "Old Navy" (1579 to 1648) ==
This is the period when the Dutch provinces consolidated their independence from Spanish rule, forming the United Provinces of the Netherlands, and took part in the Eighty Years' War. Almost all of these ships were relatively small, with only a single gun deck, and were owned by the five Admiralties. The majority were between 120 and 130 feet in length as measured on the upper deck, the exceptions being the fleet flagships built in 1632 and 1644, which are separately listed below; the warships built for the Admiralties were supplemented frequently by ships hired from the VOC (East India Company, established 1602), WIC (West India Company, established 1621) or other mercantile source (this was particularly true in 1652, at the outbreak of the 1st Anglo-Dutch War), but only a few of these are mentioned.

=== Fleet flagships ===
The Aemilia and Brederode, although entering service 12 years apart, had identical dimensions of 144 ft x 35 ft 3 in x 14 ft 2 in, in Amsterdam feet (equating to 132 ft x 32 ft x 13 ft 6 in in Rotterdam feet). Both were built for the Maas Admiralty in the naval shipyard at Rotterdam by Jan Salomonszoon van den Tempel. Each was a two-decked ship, with 13 pairs of gunports on the lower tier in Aemilia and 12 pairs in Brederode. Although no dimensions are known for the Maagd van Dordrecht, she was quoted as being 300 lasts (the same as Aemilia) so was probably of similar size.

- (M) Aemilia. 46 guns (built 1632, 300 lasts). Carried (in 1642) 4 × 36-pdrs; 11 × 24-pdrs; 33 × 12-pdrs; 9 × 6-pdrs; crewed (1635) by 160 sailors and 30 soldiers. She served as Lieutenant-Admiral Maarten Harpertszoon Tromp's flagship at the Battle of the Downs in 1639 (by then with 57 guns); sold to France 1643 as a privateer, captured by Spain and broken up 1647.
- (M) Maagd van Dordrecht. 42 guns (built 1632, 300 lasts). Carried (in 1642) 10 × 24-pdrs; 14 × 18-pdrs; 16 × 12-pdrs; 6 × 6-pdrs; crewed by 140 sailors and 30 soldiers. She was flagship of Vice-Adm Witte Corneliszoon de With from 1639 to 1643, but not subsequently mentioned.
- (M) Brederode. 49 guns (built 1644). Carried (in 1652) 4 × 36-pdrs; 12 × 24-pdrs; 8 × 18-pdrs; 20 × 12-pdrs; 10 × 6-pdrs; crewed by 175 sailors and 75 soldiers. Up-gunned to 54 guns, she served as the fleet flagship for most of the First Anglo-Dutch War (under Maarten Tromp from 1652 to 1653, and Witte de With to end of career in 1658); captured and sunk in the Battle of the Sound on 8 November 1658.

=== Ships of between 120 and 130 feet ===
- (N) Eenhoorn (or Witte Eenhoorn). 34 guns (built 1623, measuring 125 × 29 × 11 1/2ft, 200 lasts) - 1655
- (N) Stad Medemblik. 26 guns (built 1625, 120 × 27 × 11 ft) – sunk at the Battle of the Gabbard in June 1653.
- (Z) Middelburg. 30 guns (1632, 125 ft)
- (A) Utrecht. 32 guns (1633) – Blew up on 28 September 1648
- (M) Gelderland. 40 guns (1634, 128 ft) – 1659
- (A) Frederik Hendrik. 36 guns (1636)
- (A) Zutphen. 30 guns (1636, 125 ft)
- (A) Bommel. 30 guns (1637, 120 ft) – broken up in 1655
- (F) Breda. 28 guns (1637 purchase from VOC, 120 ft) – captured by Sweden in the Battle of the Sound in 1658
- (N) Eendracht. 42 guns (1639, 130 ft) – sunk in action 1676
- (A) Zon (or Vergulde Zon). 40 guns (1640, 124 ft)
- (A) Edam. 38 guns (1641, 124 ft) – captured by English Navy on 4 June 1669, becoming HMS Black Bull
- (A) Groningen. 40 guns (1641, 125 ft)
- (A) Goes (or Ter Goes). 40 guns (1641, 124 × 30 × 11 ft)
- (A) Graaf Willem. 40 guns (1641, 125 ft) – captured by England at the Battle of the Gabbard, 1653
- (N) Prinses Roijaal. 40 guns (built 1641, measuring 125 × 30 × 11 1/2ft)
- (R) Prinses Roijaal Maria. 36 guns (built 1643, measuring 124 ft 4 in x 29 ft 5 in x 13 ft 1 in) – captured by England in June 1652, renamed Princess Maria
- (A) Gewapende Ruyter (captured French Villeroi). 36 guns (1650) – Captured by England 1652
- (A) Maan. 40 guns (built 1643, measuring 125 × 31 × 12 ft) – broken up 1656
- (A) Verenigde Provinciën (or Zeven Provinciën). 40 guns (1643, 128 ft) – broken up 1665
- (A) Zeelandia. 34 guns (1643, 120 × 29 1/2 x 11 ft) - sunk in action 12 December 1677
- (Z) Vlissingen. 32 guns (1643, 130 ft)
- (A) Haarlem. 40 guns (1644, 128 ft) – broken up 1667
- (A) Leeuwarden. 34 guns (built 1645, measuring 121 × 30 × 12 1/2 ft) - hired to Venice 1655
- (M) Prinses Louijsa. 36 guns (built 1647, measuring 120 ft x 28 ft 4 in x 12 ft 6 in)

== Ships of the "New Navy" (1650 to 1682) ==
This is the period when the United Provinces fought three Anglo-Dutch Wars – conflicts of 1652-1656, 1665-1667 and 1672-1674; although England withdrew from this contest in 1674, the Dutch remained at war against the French until 1678. The Charter (rating) system was introduced in 1652 - initially defined by ships' lengths - but was radically revised during this era (see notes above).

At the start of the 1st Anglo-Dutch War, the Dutch navies relied heavily on hired ships to expand their fleet, but a programme to build thirty new ships of the line was promptly started. This comprised a flagship of 150 (Amsterdam) feet in length (the Eendracht of 1653), and twenty-nine other ships of 130 feet or more. It was followed within a year by a second thirty-ship programme, again consisting of a flagship of 150 (Amsterdam) feet in length (the Groot Hollandia of 1654), and twenty-nine other ships of 130 feet or more.

=== 1st Charter ===
The first two of these were launched for the Maas Admiralty in 1653 and 1654. While structurally three-deckers, on these two ships the upper deck was only armed forward (under the forecastle) and aft (under the quarterdeck), with no guns in the waist (this system was also common to other navies in the mid 17th century). Each measured 150 × 38 × 15 Amsterdam feet, and was initially armed with 58 guns. The first ship was originally intended to be named Prins Willem, but Willem himself ruled that it should bear the name Eendracht ("Concord") to honour the relationship between the seven provinces which constituted the United Netherlands.

- (M) Eendracht 58 guns originally, 72 by 1665 (1653). Designed by Jan Salomonszoon van den Tempel, built at Dordrecht - sunk (by magazine explosion) at Battle of Lowestoft on 13 June 1665
- (M) Groot Hollandia (or simply Holland) 58 guns originally (1654). Designed by Jan Salomonszoon van den Tempel, built at Dordrecht - sold in 1687.

=== Other ships of 130 feet or more ===
==== Built 1648-1652 ====
- (A) Jaarsveld. 44 guns (1648), 130 ft x 32 ft x 13 ft – flagship of Johan van Galen at the Battle of Montecristo (September 1652); wrecked 9 February 1653 on a rock when leaving Livorno.
- (A) Vrede. 44 guns (1650) 131 1/2 ft x 32 1/2 ft x 13 ft - the precursor of the numerous 130-ft ships built in the First Anglo-Dutch War building programme; she took part in the Battles of Dover (June 1652), Dungeness (Dec 1652), Portland (Feb/March 1653) and the Gabbard (June 1653), all under Gideon de Wildt; later she took part in the Battle of Lowestoft (May 1665) under Hendrik Gotskens, and was broken up 1667.
- (A) Vrijheid. 46 guns (1651), 134 ft x 34 ft x 13.25 ft – the largest ship built for the Admiralty of Amsterdam since the early part of the 17th Century. she took part in the Battle of Portland (Feb/March 1653) and was Vice-Adm Witte de With's flagship in the Battle of Scheveningen (Aug 1653); she blew up and sank in action at the Battle of Palermo on 2 June 1676.
- (A) Huis van Nassau. 36 guns (1651). Formerly the Portuguese Sao Bartholemeu, captured in 1651. Sold 18 August 1651.
- (F) Groenwald. 44 guns (1652), 132 1/2 ft x 31 ft. Deleted 1655.

==== The 1653 Programme ====
The Dutch had learnt by late 1652, following their defeats in the first year of the Anglo-Dutch War, that a haphazard collection of warships and armed merchantmen could not prevail against a professional naval force. In October 1652 discussions began with a view to producing specially designed warships. In February 1653 the States-General authorised the building of thirty new warships, financed by two million guilders. Tromp's plea that these should all be as big as or bigger than the equivalent English ships was ignored, but the programme was completed in 1653, comprising the flagship Eendracht (1st Charter, 150 ft in length) and 29 lesser ships.

- (M) Prins Hendrik 44 guns (130 ft). Built by Jacon Hermanszoon Wittert. Last mention in 1656 for expedition to Danzig, under command of Aert van Nes.
- (M) Utrecht (130 ft)
- (F) Prinses Albertina (130 ft)
- (F) Westergo (134 ft)
- (F) Oostergo (140 ft)
- (F) Stad en Lande (134 ft)
- (F) Elf Steden (130 ft)
- (N) Wapen van Holland 50 guns (134 ft)
- (N) Jozua 50 guns (136 ft)
- Seven ships were built for the Admiralty of Zeeland, two each in Middelburg, Veere and Zaandam, and one in Vlissingen.
  - (Z) Dordrecht. 46 guns (Middelburg, 1653) 130 ft x 34 ft x 13 1/2 ft. Not mentioned after 1673.
  - (Z) Middelburg. 46 guns (Middelburg, 1653) 130 ft x 33 ft x 13 1/2 ft. Not mentioned after 1693.
  - (Z) Veere (also called Ter Veere, or Wapen van Ter Veere, or Kampveere). 44 guns (Veere, 1653) 130 ft x 33 ft x 13 1/2 ft. Captured by the English in 1673, and renamed Arms of Terver.
  - (Z) Vlissingen. 44 guns (Vlissingen, 1653) 130 ft x 33 ft x 13 1/2 ft. Not mentioned after 1674.
  - (Z) Zeelandia (also called Hof van Zeeland, or Groot Zeelandia). ? guns (Veere, 1653) 136 ft x 34 ft x 13 3/4 ft. Burnt in action 1666.
  - (Z) Zierikzee (also called Wapen van Zierikzee). 40 guns (Zaandam, 1653) 130 ft x 31 ft x 13 1/2 ft. Not mentioned after 1674.
  - (Z) Utrecht. ? guns (Zaandam, 1653) 134 ft x 33 ft x 13 1/2 ft. Not mentioned after 1673.
- Ten ships were built for the Admiralty of Amsterdam, all in that port.
  - (A) Amsterdam. (140 ft)
  - (A) Burcht van Leiden. (132 1/2 ft)
  - (A) Landman. (130 ft)
  - (A) Maarseveen (or Huis te Maarseveen) (130 ft)
  - (A) Oosterwijk (or Huis te Oosterwijk) (140 ft)
  - (A) Stad en Lande (130 ft)
  - (A) Stavoren. (130 ft)
  - (A) Zuiderhuis. (130 ft)
  - (A) Jaarsveld (or Huis te Jaarsveld). (130 ft)
  - (A) Dom van Utrecht. (130 ft)
- (A) Huis te Kruiningen (140 ft) – originally ordered for Genoa, and purchased by the Amsterdam Admiralty on the stocks.
- (A) Huis te Zwieten (146 ft) – originally ordered for Genoa, and purchased by the Amsterdam Admiralty on the stocks. Given to the VOC, rearmed with 70 guns, captured by England at the Battle of Lowestoft, 1665

Armaments were significantly increased over the lifetimes of these ships. As an example, the Zeeland ships of 130 (Amsterdam) feet in length were designed to each carry 44 guns - comprising four bronze 24-pounders, ten iron 18-pounders and four bronze 12-pounder on the lower deck; eight iron 12-pounders and ten iron 8-pounders on the upper deck; and eight bronze 6-pounders on the quarterdeck; but all ended up carrying a heavier armament or up to 50 guns or even more.

==== The 1654 Programme ====
A second set of thirty warships was ordered in 1653 by the States-General, again comprising a flagship (the Groot Hollandia, similar to the Eendracht) and 29 smaller ships. In January 1654 the States-General decreed that, since it - rather than the provincial Admiralties - had financed these programmes, all sixty ships would be considered national property, so that the Admiralties were unable to sell them off at the conclusion of hostilities, as had been the practice in the past.

- (M) Prins Willem 44 guns (134 ft)
- (A) Doesburg (130 ft)
- (A) Duivervoorde (130 ft)
- (M) Klein Hollandia 52 guns (134 ft) - sunk in action 1672, defending the Smyrna convoy
- (A) Prins te Paard (136 ft)
- (A) Gouden Leeuw (134 ft)
- (N) Alkmaar (or Burgh van Alkmaar) 32 guns (130 ft)
- (N) Caleb 42 guns (132 ft)
- (N) Hollandsche Tuin 56 guns (134 ft x 34 ft)
- (N) Gelderland (136 ft x 36 ft)
- (N) Wapen van Nassau (134 ft x 34 ft) – (also called Gouden Leeuw)
- (N) Drie Helden Davids (130 ft)
- (F) Omlandia (130 ft)
- (A) Dom van Utrecht (130 ft)
- (A) Tromp (130 ft)
- (A) Tijdverdrijf (136 ft x 34 ft)
- (A) Stad Gouda (130 ft)
- (M) Gelderland (134 ft) – later renamed Prins Mauritz
- (A) Raadhuis van Haarlem (130 ft)

=== Other ships of the line (less than 130 ft) ===
Note that this list is incomplete and will be extended.

- (N) Jupiter (128 ft x 30 ft). Built 1653, sold 1686.
- (F) Klein Frisia (120 ft x 30 ft). Built 1653, not mentioned after 1676.
- (M) Prins Maurits (ex-Gelderland) 39 guns (119 3/4 ft). Built 1653-54 by Jacob Wittert at Rotterdam. Burnt by the English at the Battle of Lowestoft in 1665.
- (M) Prins Willem 44 guns (127 ft 7 in x 32 ft 5 in). Built 1654 at Delfshaven.
- (M) Brielle (127 ft 7 in x 32 ft 5 in). Built 1655 in Rotterdam, lost 1657.
- (M) Dordrecht (or Wapen van Dordrecht) 42 guns (127 ft 7 in x 32 ft 5 in). Built 1655 at Rotterdam. Not mentioned after 1665.
- (M) Rotterdam 26 guns (127 ft 7 in x 32 ft 5 in). Built 1655 in Rotterdam.

=== Hired East India Company (VOC) ships ===
- Mercurius 36 guns (1653, 122 1/2 ft) - East Indiaman. Sunk at the Battle of Scheveningen, 1653
- Louisa Hendrika 45 – East Indiaman, served as warship
- Vogelstruis 40 guns (1652, 160 ft) – East Indiaman, hired about July 1652
- Witte Lam 28 (1652, 127 ft) – East Indiaman, hired in March 1652, but discarded by December.
- Groote Liefde 38 (1652, 132 ft) – East Indiaman, hired in March 1652. Captured by England at Battle of Portland in 1653, renamed Great Charity; retaken by the Dutch at Battle of Lowestoft in 1665.

=== Built 1660 to 1680 ===
With the outbreak of the Second Anglo-Dutch War, the Staten-Generaal ordered the construction of twenty-four large ships, with a second group of twenty-four being added soon after. This programme, which was all built in the period 1664 to 1667, included ten ships of 160 (Amsterdam) feet length or more, now forming the 1st Charter.

==== 1st Charter ====
- (A) Hollandia 82 guns (1665, 165 ft) - Cornelis Tromp's flagship at the St James Day Battle, sold to be broken up in 1694
- (M) Zeven Provinciën 80 guns (1665, 163 ft) - Michiel de Ruyter's flagship at the St James Day Battle, broken up 1694
- (N) Pacificatie 80 (1665, 160 ft) - Volckert Schram's flagship at the St James Day Battle
- (M) Eendracht 76-80 (1666, 160 ft) - Aert van Nes's flagship at the St James Day Battle
- (N) Westfriesland 78 (1666, 160 ft)- Jan Meppel's flagship at the St James Day Battle
- (A) Gouden Leeuw 80 (1666, 170 ft) - Cornelis Tromp's flagship at the Battle of Texel
- (A) Olifant (or Witte Oliphant) 80 (1666, 171 ft)
- (A) Dolphijn 84 (1667, 171 ft)
- (M) Voorzichtigheid 80-84 (1667, 165 ft) - renamed (rebuilt?) Wakende Kraan in 1677
- (M) Vrijheid 80 (1667, 165 ft)

==== 2nd Charter and below ====
This list includes ships of the line built (all for the Amsterdam Admiralty) in the period 1661 to 1663, prior to the outbreak of the Second Anglo-Dutch War.

- (A) Liefde 70 (1661, 140 ft) – broken up 1666
- (A) Geloof 60 (1661, 140 ft) – broken up 1676
- (A) Wakende Boei 48 (1661, 130 ft) – broken up 1675
- (A) Harderwijk 46 (1662, 133 ft) – broken up 1693
- (A) Provincie van Utrecht 60 (1663, 145 ft) – broken up 1691
- (A) Waasdorp 68 (1663, 150 ft) – broken up 1666
- (A) Spiegel. 66 guns (1663, 156 ft x 41 ft x 15 ft) – Built at Amsterdam by Jan van Rheenen, this was the first three-decker in Dutch service, although on the upper deck she was not armed in the waist; the name means either "mirror" or "transom" in Dutch. This fairly 'short' three-decker (classed as 2nd Charter) was armed with 6 × 24-pdrs and 16 × 18-pdrs on the lower deck, 24 × 12-pdrs on the middle deck, and 20 × 6-pdrs on the upper and quarter decks. Served as flagship of Vice-Admiraal Michiel de Ruyter from 1664 until August 1665, including his expedition to the Caribbean and West Africa from 1664 to 1665; broken up in 1676.
- (A) Akerboom 60 (1664, 140 ft) – wrecked 1689
- (A) Gideon 60 (1664, 140 ft) – broken up 1689
- (A) Steenbergen 64 (1664, 150 ft) – sunk at Battle of Palermo in 1676
- (N) Monnikendam 62 (1664, 140 ft) – wrecked 1683
- (N) Noorderkwartier 60 (1664, 136 ft) – sold 1686
- (A) Kalandsoog 68 (1665, 150 ft) – broken up 1691
- (A) Deventer 62 (1665, 148 or 150 ft) – wrecked 1673
- (F) Vredewold 60 (1665, 140 ft)
- (A) Gouden Leeuwen 50 (1665, 141 ft)
- (A) Beschermer 54 (1665, 141 3/4 ft)
- (A) Essen 50 (1665, 142 ft)
- (Z) Zierikzee 60 (1665, 145 ft)
- (M) Delfland 70 (1665)
- (F) Frisia (or Groot Frisia) 74 (1665, 150 ft)
- (F) Prins Hendrik Casimir 74 (1665, 150 ft)
- (A) Wapen van Utrecht 62 (1665, 152 ft)
- (A) Gouda 72 (1665, 157 1/2 ft)
- (A) Komeetster 70 (1665, 152 1/2 ft))
- (A) Reigersbergen (or Blauwe Reiger) 74 (1665, 156 ft)
- (Z) Walcheren 70 (1665, 155 ft)
- (Z) Gekroonde Burgh 70 (1666, 150 ft)
- (M) Ridderschap 72 (1666, 150 ft)
- (N) Wapen van Enkhuizen 72 (1665, 150 ft)
- (F) Groningen 72 (1666, 150 ft)
- (F) Zevenvolden 76 (1666)
- (F) Sneek 65 (1666, 150 ft)
- (Z) Tholen 60 (1666, 145 ft)
- (Z) Domburg 60 (1666, 145 ft)
- (N) Alkmaar 62 (1666, 140 ft)
- (M) Schieland 54 (1666, 140 ft)
- (M) Wassenaar 56 (1666, 140 ft)
- (M) Gelderland 72 (1666, 150 ft)
- (M) Maagd van Dordrecht 68 (1666, 150 ft)
- (N) Prins van Oranje (or Jonge Prins) 62 (1666, 150 ft)
- (N) Eenhoorn (or Wapen van Hoorn) 70 (1667)
- (A) Woerden 72 (1667, 150 ft)
- (N) Monnikendam 70 (1671)
- (A) Oudshoorn 70 (1672)

Note the earlier Oudshoorn of 70 guns was the prize Swiftsure captured from the English at the Four Days Battle in 1666

==== Prizes and purchases ====
- Carolus Quintus (Charles V) (East Indiaman) 52 (1665)
- (Z) Zwanenburg 48 (ex-English St Patrick, captured on 5 February 1667)

== Ships of the "Expanded Navy" (1682 to 1714) ==
This is the period that the United Provinces fought in alliance with the English Navy against the French fleet of Louis XIV. By the start of the 1680s, the ships of the 1660s were wearing out, and in 1682 a programme of 36 new ships was authorised by the Staten-Generaal. In 1685 a long-term plan for a battlefleet of 96 ships was agreed in principle (to comprise 20 of the 1st Charter, 28 of the 2nd, 24 of the 3rd and 24 of the 4th), although this target was never fully achieved.

=== 1st Charter ===
These were all three-deckers, with standard dimensions (all in Amsterdam feet) of 170 ft on the upper deck, 146¼ ft on the keel, 43 ft in breadth and 16 ft depth in hold. In later ships this standard was stretched to a greater length. The typical armament for one of these ships was 28 × 24-pdrs on the lower deck, 28 × 18-pdrs on the middle deck, 28 × 12-pdrs on the upper deck and 8 × 6-pdrs on the quarterdeck; however, this varied sometimes.

- (Z) Zeelandia 90-94 guns (1682, 170 ft)
- (N) Westfriesland 90-94 guns (1682, 170 ft)
- (M) Admiraal Generaal (or Kapitein Generaal) 86 guns (1683, 170 ft) – Discarded 1704
- (A) Prinses Maria 92 guns (1683, 170 ft) – sold to be broken up in 1708
- (A) Prins Willem 92 guns (1687, 170 ft) – broken up in 1717 or 1718
- (N) Kasteel van Medemblik 90-94 guns (1688, 170 ft)
- (M) Koning Willem 92-94 guns (1688, 170 ft)
- (A) Keurvorst van Brandenburg 92 guns (1689, 170 ft) – Renamed Koning van Pruisen ('King of Prussia') in 1701, broken up in 1715
- (A) Keurvorstin van Brandenburg 92 guns (1689, 170 ft) – Renamed Koningin van Pruisen ('Queen of Prussia') in 1701, broken up in 1713
- (A) Keurvorst van Saksen 92 guns (1689, 170 ft)
- (N) Beschermer 96 (1690, 170 ft))
- (M) Beschermer 90 guns (1691, 174 ft) – sold to be broken up in 1715
- (Z) Middelburg 80 guns (1691)
- (A) Unie 94 (1692, 173 ft) – broken up 1721
- (M) Zeven Provinciën 90-94 guns (1694, 170 ft) – stranded in 1705, wreck sold 1706
- (A) Vrijheid 96 guns (1695, 176 ft) – sold to be broken up in 1723
- (Z) Middelburg 80-88 guns (1699, 180 ft)
- (M) Eendracht 100 guns (1703, 181 ft)
- (A) Amsterdam 96 guns (1712, 176 ft) – sold 1738 as useless

Note that, although the 1685 long-term Plan had called for twenty ships of the 1st Charter to be built, the twentieth and last Dutch three-decker - the Amsterdam Admiralty's 96-gun Haarlem (of 177 ft) was not built until 1721.

=== 2nd Charter ===
These were all two-deckers, with standard dimensions (all in Amsterdam feet) of 156 ft on the upper deck, 133 1/2 ft on the keel, 41 ft in breadth and 15 ft depth in hold. In later ships this standard was stretched to a greater length. A typical armament for one of these ships was 26 × 18-pdrs on the lower deck, 26 × 12-pdrs on the upper deck, 18 × 6-pdrs on the quarterdeck and 4 × 3-pdrs on the poop

- (A) Gelderland 74 (1683, 156 ft) – sold to be broken up in 1708
- (A) Hollandia 74 guns (1683, 156 ft)
- (M) Maas 70 guns (1683, 156 ft) sold to be broken up in 1704
- (N) Noorderkwartier 72 guns (1688, 156 ft)
- (N) Noorderkwartier 74 guns (1690, 156 ft) – taken to pieces in 1712
- (N) Maagd van Enkhuizen 72 guns (1690, 156 ft) – burnt at Battle of Beachy Head (1690)
- (A) Elswout 74 guns (1691, 156 ft)
- (Z) Eerste Edele 72 guns (1691, 156 ft)
- (Z) Walcheren 72 guns (1691, 152 ft)
- (N) Enkhuizen 72 guns (1691, 156 ft)
- (M) Ridderschap 72 guns (1691, 156 ft)
- (M) Rotterdam 72 guns (1691, 156 ft)
- (M) Hollandia 74 guns (1692, 156 ft) – sold to be broken up in 1716
- (M) Dordrecht 74 guns (1692, 156 ft)
- (A) Reigersbergen (or Wapen van Reigersbergen) 74 guns (1692, 156 ft) – wrecked in 1692, replaced by next ship
- (A) Reigersbergen 74 guns (1693, 156 ft) – broken up in 1721
- (A) Slot van Muiden 74 guns (1693, 156 ft) – broken up about 1722
- (N) Alkmaar (or Wapen van Alkmaar) 70 guns (1693, 156 ft)
- (A) Katwijk 74 guns (1694, 156 ft)
- (A) Deventer 74 guns (1694, 156 ft) – broken up in 1720
- (A) Nijmegen (or Stad Nimwegen) 74 guns (1694, 156 ft) – broken up in 1722
- (A) Hollandia 74 guns (1702 or 1703, 161 ft) – broken up in 1725
- (A) Provincie van Utrecht 74 guns (1702 or 1703, 161 ft) – broken up in 1725
- (M) Rotterdam 74 guns (1703, 156 ft x 42 ft 9 in x 16 ft 9 in) – sold in 1723
- (M) Maas 74 guns (1707-08, 160 ft x 43 ft 9 in x 18 ft) – broken up in 1724
- (A) Zeelandia 74 guns (1710, 164 ft x 44 ft)
- (A) Gelderland 74 guns (1711, 164 ft x 44 ft) – sold to Portugal in 1717
- (A) Leyden 72 guns (1714, 164 ft x 44 ft) – sold to be broken up in 1752-54

=== 3rd Charter ===
These were also all two-deckers, with standard dimensions (all in Amsterdam feet) of 145 ft on the upper deck, 123 1/2 ft on the keel, 37 1/2 ft in breadth and 14¼ ft depth in hold. In later ships this standard was stretched to a greater length. A typical armament was 24 × 18-pdrs on the lower deck, 24 × 12-pdrs on the upper deck, and 16 × 6-pdrs on the quarterdeck.

- (Z) Veere 60-62 guns (1682, 145 or 147 ft)
- (A) Zeelandia 62 guns (1685, 145 ft)
- (A) Friesland 62 guns (1685, 145 ft) – lost at the Battle of Beachy Head in 1690
- (A) Leiden 64 guns (1687, 145 ft) – broken up in 1712
- (A) Haarlem 64 guns (1688, 145 ft) – broken up in 1712
- (Z) Zierikzee 64 guns (1688, 146 ft)
- (M) Veluwe 68 guns (1688, 153 ft) – sold to be broken up in 1705
- (A) Amsterdam guns 64 guns (1688, 145 ft)
- (Z) Tholen 60 guns (1688, 145 ft) – lost at Battle of Beachy Head in 1690
- (A) Banier 64 guns (1691, 145 ft)
- (M) Wassenaar 66 guns (1692, 145 ft)
- (M) Schieland 54 guns (1693, 146 ft) – sold in 1712 or 1720
- (M) Zeelandia 66 guns (1693, 145 ft)
- (N) Utrecht 64 guns (1693, 145 ft)
- (N) Arnhem (or Wapen van Arnhem) 64 guns (1693, 145 ft)
- (A) Het Loo (or 't Loo) 64 guns (1693, 145 ft)
- (M) Overijssel 55 guns (1694, 145 ft)
- (A) Dieren guns 64 (1694, 145 ft)
- (A) Dom van Utrecht 64 guns (1694, 150 ft)
- (F) Prince Friso 68 guns (1694, 145 ft)
- (M) Delft 54 guns (1699, 146 ft)
- (M) Schieland 54 guns (1699, 146 ft)
- (A) Gouda 64 guns (1698, 148 ft) – sold to be broken up in 1720
- (A) Aemilia 60 guns (1699, 148 ft
- (Z) Nassau 64 guns (1698, 147 1/2 ft)
- (M) Gelderland 64 guns (1699, 151 ft)
- (A) Leeuw 64 guns (1700, 150 ft)
- (A) Raadhuis van Edam 64 guns (1700, 150 ft)
- (M) Lepelaar 52 guns (1703, 145 ft)
- (M) Groot Heeresveld 64 guns (1707-08, 153 ft)
- (M) Starrenburg (1708, 153 ft)
- (A) Prins Friso (1708, 150 ft)
- (N) Buis 64 guns (1709, 150 ft)
- (A) Loosdrecht 64 guns (1710, 150 ft) – sold to be broken up in 1739
- (A) Boetzelaar 64 guns (1711, 152 ft) – sold to be broken up in 1739

=== 4th Charter ===
These too were two-deckers, with standard dimensions (all in Amsterdam feet) of 135 ft on the upper deck, 115 ft on the keel, 35 ft in breadth and 14 ft depth in hold. In later ships this standard was stretched to a greater length. A typical armament for one of these ships was 22 × 18-pdrs on the lower deck, 22 × 8-pdrs on the upper deck, and 8 × 4-pdrs on the quarterdeck.

- (A) Vrede? 50 (1681)
- (N) Eenhoorn (or Wapen van Hoorn) 40 (1682, 135 ft)
- (A) Stad en Lande 50 guns (1682) – captured by France on 29 June 1694 (while on lease to Friesland Admiralty)
- (Z) Tholen 54 guns (1682, 135 ft) – blew up by accident in 1687
- (M) Honslaardijk (or Huis van Honslaarsdijk) 48 guns (1683, 135 ft) – captured by France in 1698
- (A) Beemster 50 guns (1686, 138 ft)
- (A) Castricum 52 guns (1686) – captured by France on 21 August 1692 (while on lease to Friesland Admiralty)
- (Z) Kortgene 50 guns (1687)
- (Z) Goes (or Ter Goes) 54 guns (1688, 136 ft)
- (Z) Vlissingen 54 guns (1688, 136 ft)
- (A) Gasterland 52 guns (1688, 135 ft) – captured by the French on 22 May 1703
- (M) Schiedam 54 guns (1689, 135 ft)
- (M) Provincie van Utrecht 50 guns (1689, 135 ft)
- (N) Tijger? 52 (1689)
- (A) Beschermer (or Wapen van de Schermer) 52 guns (1690, 130 ft) – captured by the French on 22 May 1703
- (A) Ooststellingwerf 52 guns (1691, 135 ft)
- (M) Delft 54 guns (1691, 135 ft) – captured by France in 1697
- (A) Ripperda 52 guns (1691, 135 ft) – hulked 1719, sold to be broken up in 1736
- (A) Muiderberg 52 guns (1693, 135 ft) – captured by the French on 22 May 1703
- (A) Damieten 50 guns (1693, 135 ft)
- (F) Prins Friso 56 guns (1693, 135 ft) – captured by France on 29 June 1694, replaced by new 68-gun 3rd Charter ship in 1594
- (F) Amalia (or Prinses Amalia) 56 guns (1693, 135 ft)
- (F) Friesland (or Wapen van Friesland) 58 guns, 145 ft (1694)
- (A) Ster (or Morgan Ster) 52 guns (1694, 138 ft)
- (A) Zon 52 guns (1694, 138 ft) – broken up in 1723
- (A) Maan 52 guns (1694, 138 ft)
- (M) Brielle 52 guns (1695, 124 ft)
- (M) Rotterdam 52 guns (1695, 124 ft) – captured by the French in on 22 May 1703
- (N) Wapen van Medemblik 50 guns (1696, 135 ft)
- (A) Overijssel 52 guns (1696, 145 ft) – broken up in 1728
- (A) Wulverhorst 52 guns (1696, 145 ft) – captured and burnt by the French on 19 May 1705
- (Z) Veere (or Ter Veere) 52-54 guns (1697, 143 ft)
- (A) Hardenbroek 52 guns (1698, 139 ft) – captured by the French on 2 October 1706, sold to Russia as Esperans
- (A) Batavier 52 guns (1699, 140 ft)
- (A) Hof van Rhenen (or Hof Rhenen) 52 guns (1700, 140 ft)
- (A) Keizerswaard 52 guns (1700, 140 ft) – broken up in 1728
- (A) Nieuwenhuis 52 guns (1700, 140 ft) – broken up in 1731
- (N) Deventer (or Wapen van Deventer) 52 guns (1700, 140 ft)
- (M) Overijssel 54 guns (1703-04, 140 ft)
- (M) Seepelaar? 54 (1703)
- (M) Matenes 54 guns (1704, 145 ft)
- (A) Curacao 52 guns (1704, 145 ft) – wrecked on 31 May 1729
- (A) Oosterwijk 52 guns (1704, 145 ft) – sold to be broken up in 1734
- (N) Zandvoort 56 (1708)
- (N) Wolfswinkel 52 (1708)
- (N) Huis Te Neck 50 guns (1709, 140 ft)
- (A) Brakel (or Den Brakel) 52 guns (1709, 142 ft)
- (A) Duinrel (or Duinveld) 52 guns (1712, 145 ft) – hulked in 1736
- (A) Ter Meer 52 guns (1712 or 1713, 145 ft) – sold to be broken up in 1741

=== Uncertain ===
- Akerboom 60 (c. 1684)
- (A) Gaasterland 52 (1688) – Captured by France on 22 May 1703
- (N) Buis 64 (1690)
- (A) Buren 64 (1694)
- Overwinnaer (c. 1706) – Captured by France 1708 as Grand Vainqueur, sold to Russia as Viktoria
- (M) Starrenburg 64 (1708)
- Schonauwen (c. 1710) – Captured by France 1711 as Beau Parterre, sold to Russia, captured by Sweden 1714 as Kronskepp

== Ships of the Dutch Navies 1715 to 1770 ==
This is the period that the reduced Dutch forces maintained their strength at a lesser level from the conclusion of the War of the Spanish Succession. Although ships below are shown according to the 'Charter' classification, this system was in the process of being replaced by a Rating system similar to that in other countries' naval forces.

=== 1st Charter ===
- (A) Haarlem 96 guns (1721, 177 ft x 49 ft 5 in)

=== 2nd Charter ===
- (A) Gelderland 72 guns (1717)
- (A) Gouda 72 guns (1719)i
- (A) Hollandia 72 guns (1725)
- (M) Maas 74 guns (1728)
- (A) Vrijheid 72 guns (1731)
- (A) Haarlem 72 guns (1736)
- (M) Prins Willem ?74 guns (1746)
- (A) Prinses Roijaal 74 guns (1759)
- (A) Admiraal Generaal 74 guns (1764)

=== 3rd Charter ===
- (A) Purmer 64 guns (1715)
- (A) Roozendaal 64 guns (1717)
- (A) Zoeterwoude (or Soeterwoude) 64 guns (1719)
- (N) Kasteel van Egmont 64 guns (1722)
- (Z) Tholen 64 guns (1723)
- (A) Heemstede 64 guns (1724)
- (N) Kasteel van Medenblick 64 guns (1725)
- (A) Provincie van Utrecht 64 guns (1728)
- (Z) Zierikzee 64 guns (1733) – ran ashore on sandbank off Jutland and broke up in November 1782.
- (M) Rotterdam 66 guns (1741)
- Damiaten Class. Measured 160 ft x 44 ft.
  - (A) Damiaten 64 guns (1741)
  - (A) Batavier 64 guns (1746)
  - (A) Eendracht 64 guns (1747)
- (Z) Zuidbeveland 64 guns (1746)
- (A) Nassau 64 guns (1759)
- (A) Holland 64 guns (1761)
- (M) Rotterdam 60 guns (1761)
- (M) Mars 68 guns (1763)
- (A) Amsterdam 68 guns (1763)
- (A) Prinses Roijaal Frederika Sophia Wilhelmina 64 guns (1769)

=== 4th Charter ===
- (A) Polanen 52 guns (1722)
- (A) Damiaten 52 guns (1723)
- (M) Twickel 56 guns (1725)
- (A) Valkenburg 52 guns (1725)
- (A) Beemsterlust 52 guns (1725)
- (N) Ramhorst 52 guns (1725)
- (A) Boekenroode 52 guns (1729)
- (F) Prins Friso 50 guns (1730)
- (M) Delft 56 guns (1731)
- (A) Brederode 52 guns (1731)
- (A) Moriaanshoofd 52 guns (1733)
- (A) Watervliet 52 guns (1733)
- (Z) Goes (or Ter Goes) 58 guns (1733)
- (Z) Vlissingen 58 guns (1734)
- (A) Assendelft 52 guns (1736)
- (M) Dordrecht 54 guns (1739)
- (A) Burcht van Leiden 52 guns (1740)
- (A) Edam 52 guns (1741) – lost in 1741 and replaced by next ship
- (A) Edam 52 guns (1742)
- (A) Leeuwenhorst 52 guns (1742)
- (Z) Veere 54 guns (1745)
- (M) Schiedam 56 guns (1745)
- (M) Prinses Carolina 54 guns (1748)
- (A) Rhijnland 54 guns (1753)
- (A) Glindhorst 54 guns (1754)
- (A) Schieland 54 guns (1755)
- (A) Nassau Weilburg 56 guns (1760) – wrecked 1783.
- (F) Prinses Maria-Louisa 54 guns (1761) – Sold to be broken up 1781.
- (A) Kennemerland 54 guns (1761) – burnt 1778.
- (M) Rotterdam 52 guns (1761) – captured by the British on 5 January 1781.
- (A) Prinses Louisa 56 guns (1769) – renamed Broederschap by the Batavian Republic, captured by the British in the Vlieter (off Texel) on 30 August 1799 and renamed Broaderscarp.
- (A) Erf Prins 56 guns (1770) – foundered 1783.

=== 5th Charter ===
These two-decked small ships of the line were classed as 4th Rates.

- Phoenix Class. 44 guns. Measured 141 ft x 39 ft 7 in.
  - (A) Phoenix (1751)
  - (A) Zuileveld (1753)
  - (A) Bloys (1754)
  - (A) Landskroon (1755)
  - (A) Swieten (1759)

== Ships of the Dutch Navies 1771 to 1795 ==
In the period of higher international tension, culminating in the Fourth Anglo-Dutch War, a massive effort to renew the Dutch navies was undertaken. No three-deckers were built, hence no "1st Charter" is listed. This period continues until the French occupation of December 1794 to February 1795, when the five separate Admiralties were replaced on 27 February 1795 by a single committee dealing with all navy affairs. The list below is continued beyond 1795 to include other ships originally ordered for the United Netherlands but subsequently brought into service for the (French dominated) Batavian Republic.

=== 2nd Charter ===
The ships of the 2nd Charter each carried 74 guns. In general, they measured 179 (Amsterdam) feet on the upper deck (equivalent to 166 ft on the upper deck (equivalent to 166 ft 2 in in British units of measurement), with a breadth of 49 Amsterdam feet (45 1/2 British feet) and a depth in hold of 20 Amsterdam feet (18 1/2 British feet).

- (A) Neptunus 74 guns (1782) - condemned 1794
- (A) Jupiter 74 guns (1782) - captured by the British at the Battle of Camperdown on 11 October 1797 and became HMS Camperdown
- (F) Stad en Lande 74 guns (1782) - broken up 1792
- (F) Friesland 74 guns (1783) - broken up 1792
- (N) Zeven Provinciën 74 guns (1783) - sold to be broken up 1794
- (A) Vrijheid 74 guns (1783) - captured by the British at the Battle of Camperdown on 11 October 1797
- (A) Prins Maurits 74 guns (1783) - captured in 1797
- (M) Willem de Eerste 74 guns (1785) - renamed Brutus in 1795 by the Batavian Republic, then Noord Brabant in 1806 under French control; sold to be broken up in 1820
- (M) Staaten Generaal 74 guns (1788) - renamed Bato in 1798 by the Batavian Republic - run ashore and burnt at Simon's Bay on 10 January 1806 to avoid capture by the British

Note a further 74-gun ship begun at Amsterdam in 1795 (and thus not for the pre-1795 United Provinces) was launched on 9 August 1796 for the Batavian Republic as Washington – captured by the British in the Vlieter (off Texel) on 28 August 1799 and became HMS Princess of Orange.

=== 3rd Charter ===
The ships of the 3rd Charter each carried between 64 and 68 guns. In general, they measured between 167 and 168 (Amsterdam) feet on the upper deck (equivalent to 155 ft to 156 ft in British units of measurement), with a breadth of 46 3/4 to 47 Amsterdam feet (about 42 ft 10 in to 43 ft 7 in British feet) and a depth in hold of 19 Amsterdam feet (17 1/2 British feet).

- Prins Frederik Class, measuring 167 ft x 46 3/11 ft.
  - (M) Prins Frederik 68 guns (1777 at Zwindrecht) - renamed Revolutie in 1796 by the Batavian Republic, captured in Saldanha Bay 17 August 1796 by the British
  - (M) Hercules 66 guns (1781) - captured by the British at the Battle of Camperdown (Camperduin), 11 October 1797, becoming HMS Delft.
  - (M) Kortenaer 64 guns (1781) - broken up 1794
  - (M) Wassenaer 68 guns (1781 at Zwindrecht) - captured by the British at the Battle of Camperdown (Camperduin), 11 October 1797
  - (M) Prins Willem 64 guns (1783) - broken up 1795
  - (M) Dordrecht 68 guns (1783 at Dort) - captured by the British in Saldanha Bay on 17 August 1796
  - (M) Rotterdam 68 guns (1783) - sold 1799
- De Ruyter Class, measuring 167 1/2ft x 46 9/11 ft.
  - (A) Admiraal de Ruyter 68 guns (1778) - captured by the British in the Vlieter (off Texel) on 30 August 1799
  - (A) Gelderland 68 guns (1781) - captured by the British in the Vlieter (off Texel) on 30 August 1799
  - (A) Utrecht 68 guns (1781) - captured by the British in the Vlieter (off Texel) on 30 August 1799
  - (A) Unie 68 guns (1781) - capsized and sank with all (450) hands on 19 October 1782.
  - (A) Holland 68 guns (1782) - wrecked 1786
  - (A) Drente 68 guns (1782) - sold to be broken up in 1794
  - (A) Overijssel 68 guns (1782) - wrecked in 1786
- (F) Admiraal Tjerk Hiddes de Vries 68 guns (1782) - captured by the British at the Battle of Camperdown (Camperduin), 11 October 1797
- (N) Hoop 64 guns (1783) - broken up 1794
- (N) Westfriesland 64 guns (1783) - broken up 1795
- (N) Hersteller 68 guns (1783) - broken up 1795
- (N) Noord Holland 68 guns (1783) - sold to be broken up 1795
- (F) Oostergo 68 guns (1783) - not mentioned after 1794
- (F) Westergo 68 guns (1784) - condemned 1795
- (Z) Zeeland 68 guns (1784) - captured by the British at Plymouth on 4 March 1796
- (F) Zevenwolden 68 guns (1784) - captured by the British in the Vlieter (off Texel) on 30 August 1799
- (N) Verwagting 68 guns (1784) - captured by the British in the Vlieter (off Texel) on 30 August 1799, but not added to the British Navy
- (A) Cerberus 68 guns (1784) - captured by the British in the Vlieter (off Texel) on 30 August 1799
- (A) Haarlem 68 guns (1785) - captured by the British at the Battle of Camperdown (Camperduin), 11 October 1797
- (A) Leiden 68 guns (1786) - captured by the British in the Vlieter (off Texel) on 30 August 1799
- Pluto Class, measuring 167 1/2ft x 46 3/11 ft.
  - (N) Pluto 68 guns (1786) - sold to be broken up 1797.
  - (N) Pieter Florisz 68 guns (1788) - broken up 1795.
  - (A) Prins Frederik Willem 68 guns (1788) - renamed Gelikheid in 1795 by the Batavian Republic, captured by the British on 11 October 1797.
- (A) Overijssel 64 guns (former Spanish San Felipe Apostol, purchased from Spain in July 1794) - captured by the British HMS Polyphemus at Queenstown on 22 October 1795.

=== 4th Charter ===
The ships of the 4th Charter each carried from 50 to 56 guns. In general, they chiefly between 154 and 156 (Amsterdam) feet on the upper deck (equivalent to between 143 ft and 144 ft 10 in in British units of measurement. However, the larger Brakel and Tromp measured about 160 (Amsterdam) feet on the upper deck (equivalent to 148 ft 7 in in British units of measurement), with a breadth of about 45 Amsterdam feet (41 3/4 British feet) and a depth in hold of 20 Amsterdam feet (18 1/2 British feet).

- Admiraal Piet Hein Class. Measuring 154 ft x 43 ft 9 in.
  - (A) Admiraal Piet Hein. 54 guns (1774) - sold to be broken up in 1799
  - (M) Admiraal Maarten Harpentzoon Tromp. 54 guns (Zwindrecht, 1777) - captured by the British in Saldanha Bay on 17 August 1796
  - (A) Batavier. 54 guns (Amsterdam, 1779) - captured by the British in the Vlieter (off Texel) on 30 August 1799
  - (Z) Goes. 54 guns (1781) - broken up 1797
- (F) Prinses Frederika Louisa Wilhelmina 54 guns (1779) - wrecked 1781
- Delft Class. Measuring 160 ft x 45 ft.
  - (M) Delft 54 guns (Zwindrecht, 1782) - captured by the British at the Battle of Camperdown (Camperduin), 11 October 1797, but foundered on route to England.
  - (M) Brakel 56 guns (Zwindrecht, 1782) - captured by the British at Plymouth on 4 March 1796.
- Alkmar Class. Measuring 154 1/2 ft x 43 ft.
  - (N) Alkmaar 50 guns (Enkhuizen, 1783) - captured by the British at the Battle of Camperdown (Camperduin), 11 October 1797.
  - (N) Beschermer 50 guns (Enkhuizen, 1784) - captured by the British in the Vlieter (off Texel) on 30 August 1799.

=== 5th Charter ===
Although no longer considered ships of the line, these two-decked small ships were still classed as 4th Rates by the Dutch.

- (A) Hector. (Amsterdam, 1784). Measured 145 ft x 51 ft. Captured 28 August 1799 by Mitchell's squadron in the Vlieter, renamed HMS Pandour and used as troopship, later floating battery until 1805.
- (A) Unie. (1795) Former VOC ship, taken into Dutch naval service 1795, captured 28 August 1799 by Mitchell's squadron in the Vlieter, renamed HMS Drochterland and used as receiving ship at Sheerness until taken to pieces 1815.

== Dutch Warships of the Batavian and French-controlled Period (1795-1815) ==
While these 20 years are here treated together, they actually comprise four distinct political eras:
(A) The Batavian Republic (a French 'client state') - February 1795 to July 1806.
(B) The (Napoleonic) Kingdom of Holland - July 1806 to July 1810.
(C) The Annexation by France - July 1810 to 1813.
(D) The restored United Provinces of the Netherlands - 1813 to March 1815.

=== 2nd Rate (80/90-gun ships) ===
The eight ships of the Wrecker Class were built at Amsterdam and Rotterdam between 1797 and 1811. They were the largest sailing warships built in the Netherlands up to that time. The five Amsterdam-built ships (by master shipwrights R. Dorsman and P. Schuijt Jnr.) had ports for 80 guns, with 30 on the lower deck, 30 on the upper deck and 20 on the quarterdeck and forecastle - they actually mounted (in French service) twenty-eight 36-livre guns, thirty 30-livre guns, fourteen 12-livre guns, two 60-livre and six 30-livre carronades. The three Rotterdam-built ships (by master shipwright Pieter Glavimans Jnr., who probably produced the overall design for the class) were initially assigned 10 more ports on the quarterdeck and forecastle (with 10 guns behind ports and 20 in the open), causing them to be rated as 90-gun ships.

The class measured 195 (Amsterdam) feet in length, 51 feet in breadth, and 22 feet in depth in hold.

All eight ships were incorporated into the French Imperial Navy on 9 July 1810, and received French names. All were rated as 80-gun ships by the French, armed as mentioned above. All were returned to Dutch service and renamed in 1814, except for the Admiraal Piet Hein (ii) which had been re-worked as a 74-gun ship on the stocks at Rotterdam and was seized by the Dutch in their December 1813 uprising.

- Wrecker (Amsterdam, launched 28 July 1798). Renamed Koninklijke Hollander on 10 June 1806 and Kroonprins on 15 February 1808. In July 1810 renamed Prince Royal, then Prince in April 1811, reverting to Dutch control as Prins on 22 April 1814. Accommodation ship at Nieuwediep in 1816. Taken to pieces 1819.
- Admiraal Zoutman (Amsterdam, launched 15 September 1800). In July 1810 renamed Amiral Zoutman, then Zoutman in April 1811, reverting to Dutch control as Admiraal Zoutman on 22 April 1814. Accommodation ship 1818, Sold October 1829 and taken to pieces in 1830.
- Chattam (Rotterdam, launched 24 May 1800). In July 1810 renamed Chatham, reverting to Dutch control as Chattam on 1 August 1814. Taken to pieces 1823 at Vlissingen.
- Admiraal de Ruyter (i) (Rotterdam, launched 17 July 1806). Renamed Admiraal Piet Hein on 15 July 1806, Rotterdam two days later, and Koninklijke Hollander on 15 February 1808. In July 1810 renamed Royal Hollandais, then Hollandais in 1811, reverting to Dutch control as Koninklijke Hollander on 1 August 1814. Guardship at Vlissingen in 1815, and taken to pieces there in 1819.
- Leeuw (Amsterdam, launched 29 October 1806) Renamed Commercie van Amsterdam on 27 December 1806 and Amsterdamsche Handel on 18 March 1808. In July 1810 renamed Commerce d'Amsterdam, then Amsterdam in April 1811, reverting to Dutch control without further change of name on 22 April 1814. Wrecked in Algoa Bay, South Africa on 11 December 1817.
- Admiraal de Ruyter (ii) (Amsterdam, launched 9 November 1808). In July 1810 renamed Amiral de Ruyter, then De Ruyter in April 1811, reverting to Dutch control as Admiraal de Ruyter on 22 April 1814. Turned over to the colonial service in Dutch East Indies in November 1816 and taken to pieces there in 1818.
- Admiraal Evertsen (Amsterdam, launched 19 November 1808). In July 1810 renamed Amiral Evertsen, then Evertsen in April 1811, reverting to Dutch control as Admiraal Evertsen on 22 April 1814. To Batavia, Dutch East Indies, 1815-1819, but while on return voyage put into Diego Garcia with a leak, and burnt there.
- Admiraal Piet Hein (Rotterdam, uncompleted there in 1811). On 9 July 1810 renamed Amiral Piet Hein, then Piet Hein in April 1811. However, on 14 February 1811 Napoleon had ordered her to be disassembled and reworked as a 74-gun ship of the Pluton (or 'petit modele') type. Launched 1 May 1813, but seized by the Dutch in their December 1813 uprising and restored as Admiraal Piet Hein. Sheather in 1817 but taken to pieces at Vlissingen in 1819.
