= Solebay =

Solebay may refer to:

- Battle of Solebay, a naval battle of the Third Anglo-Dutch War in 1672
- HMS Solebay, any of seven ships of the Royal Navy
- Adnams Brewery, in Southwold, Suffolk, England, known as Sole Bay Brewery before it was purchased in 1872 by George and Ernest Adnams
