= Battle of Solebay =

1672 battle of the Third Anglo-Dutch War

- Part of the Franco-Dutch War and Third Anglo-Dutch War
- The Burning of the Royal James at the Battle of Solebay, 28 May 1672 by Willem van de Velde the Younger
Date	6 June 1672
Location	Solebay, England 52°20′N 1°48′E
Result	Dutch strategic victory

Belligerents
Dutch Republic	England; France

Commanders and leaders
(Dutch Republic) De Ruyter (Dutch Republic) Banckert (Dutch Republic) Van Ghent †	(Kingdom of England) York (Kingdom of England) Sandwich † (Kingdom of France) Estrées

Strength
61 ships of the line 14 frigates 32 fire ships 22 smaller ships 4,500 guns 20,700 men	80 ships of the line 13 frigates 24 fire ships 28 smaller ships 6,158 guns 35,000–40,000 men

Casualties and losses
1 ship destroyed 1 ship captured	4 ships destroyed
- Location within England Battle of Solebay (North Sea)

The Battle of Solebay took place on 6 June 1672 New Style, during the Third Anglo-Dutch War, near Southwold, Suffolk, in eastern England. A Dutch fleet under Michiel de Ruyter attacked a combined Anglo-French force in one of the largest naval battles of the Age of Sail. Fighting continued much of the day, but ended at sunset without a clear victory. However, the scattered Allied fleet had suffered far more damage and was forced to abandon any plans to land troops on the Dutch coast.

== Prelude ==
In 1672, both France and England declared war on the Dutch Republic, on the 6 and 7 April respectively. Johan de Witt, the Dutch Grand Pensionary, still harbored some hope for successful negotiations, especially with the support of influential anti-Catholic English figures such as Sir William Temple and the Earl of Sandwich. However, Louis XIV of France had already revealed his true intentions during a sharp address to the Dutch ambassador, Pieter de Groot, at the New Year's reception at his court. As French troops advanced towards the Rhine and the armies of Münster and Cologne penetrated the eastern provinces, the combined English and French fleets were poised to strike the Republic from the sea.

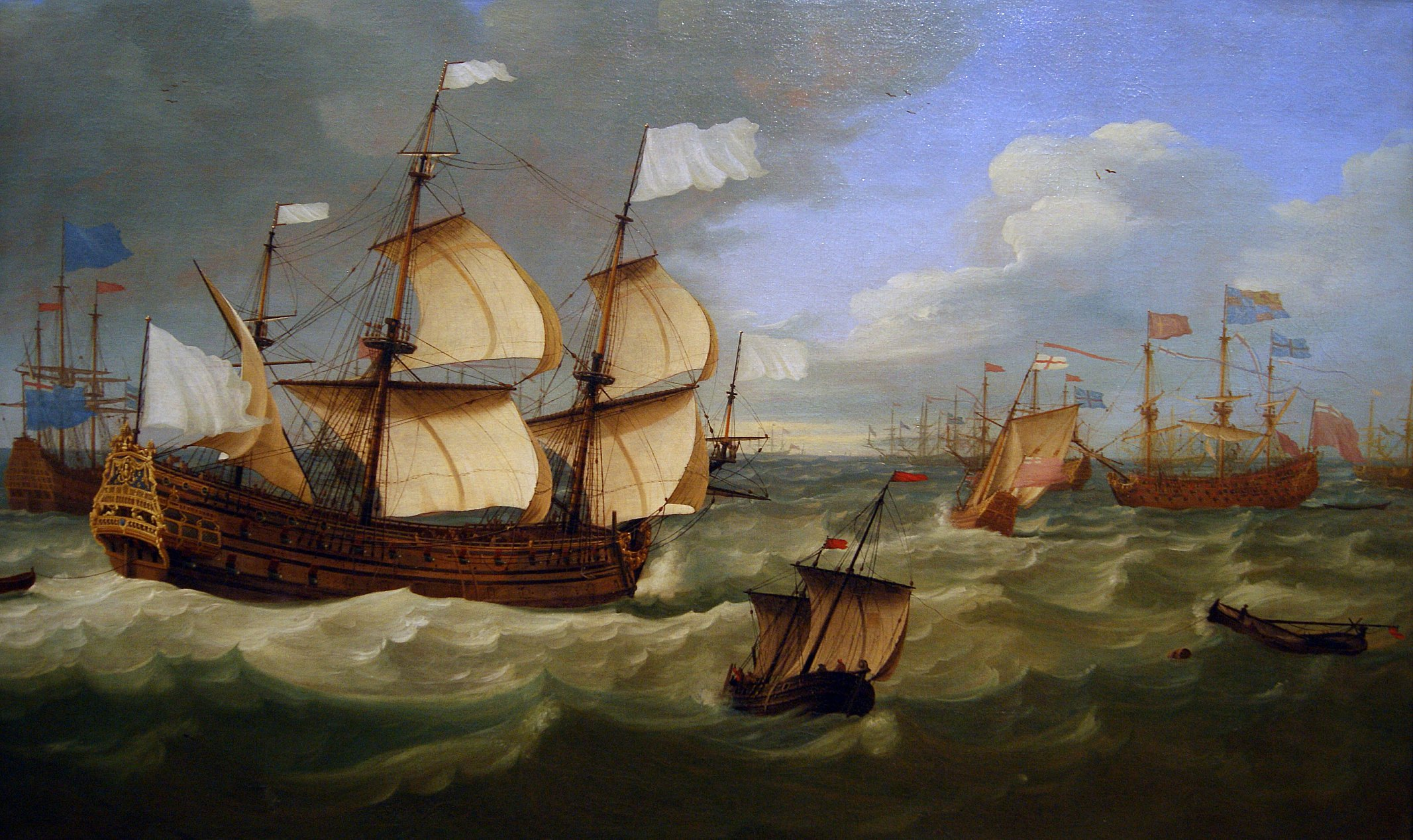
French flagship Saint-Philippe prior to the Battle of Solebay

The joint Anglo-French fleet consisted of 93 warships (sources vary), 35,000-40,000 men and 6,158 cannon. The Allies under the Duke of York and Vice-Admirals Earl of Sandwich and Jean d'Estrées, Count of Estrées planned to blockade the Dutch in their home ports and deny the North Sea to Dutch shipping. The Dutch had at their disposal a fleet of 75 warships, 20,738 men and 4,484 cannon, commanded by Lieutenant-Admirals Michiel de Ruyter, Adriaen Banckert and Willem Joseph van Ghent. The Dutch had hoped to repeat the success of the Raid on the Medway and a frigate squadron under Van Ghent sailed up the Thames in May but discovered that Sheerness Fort was now too well prepared to pass. The Dutch main fleet came too late, mainly due to coordination problems between the five Dutch admiralties, to prevent a joining of the English and French fleets. It followed the Allied fleet to the north, which, unaware of this, put in at Solebay to refit.

== Battle ==
On 7 June at dawn, around 5 a.m., off Orfordness, De Ruyter suddenly appeared in the sight of the Allied fleet. Although a lack of wind prevented De Ruyter from launching an attack with his fireships, the confusion among the suddenly alarmed English and French was still significant. Officers and sailors, still on shore, were quickly signaled to return to their ships, and the Anglo-French fleet immediately set sail, though in less than ideal order. The French, whether through accident or design, found themselves in the rear and considerably south of the English, whose vanguard under Sandwich and middle squadron under York lay close to the coast.

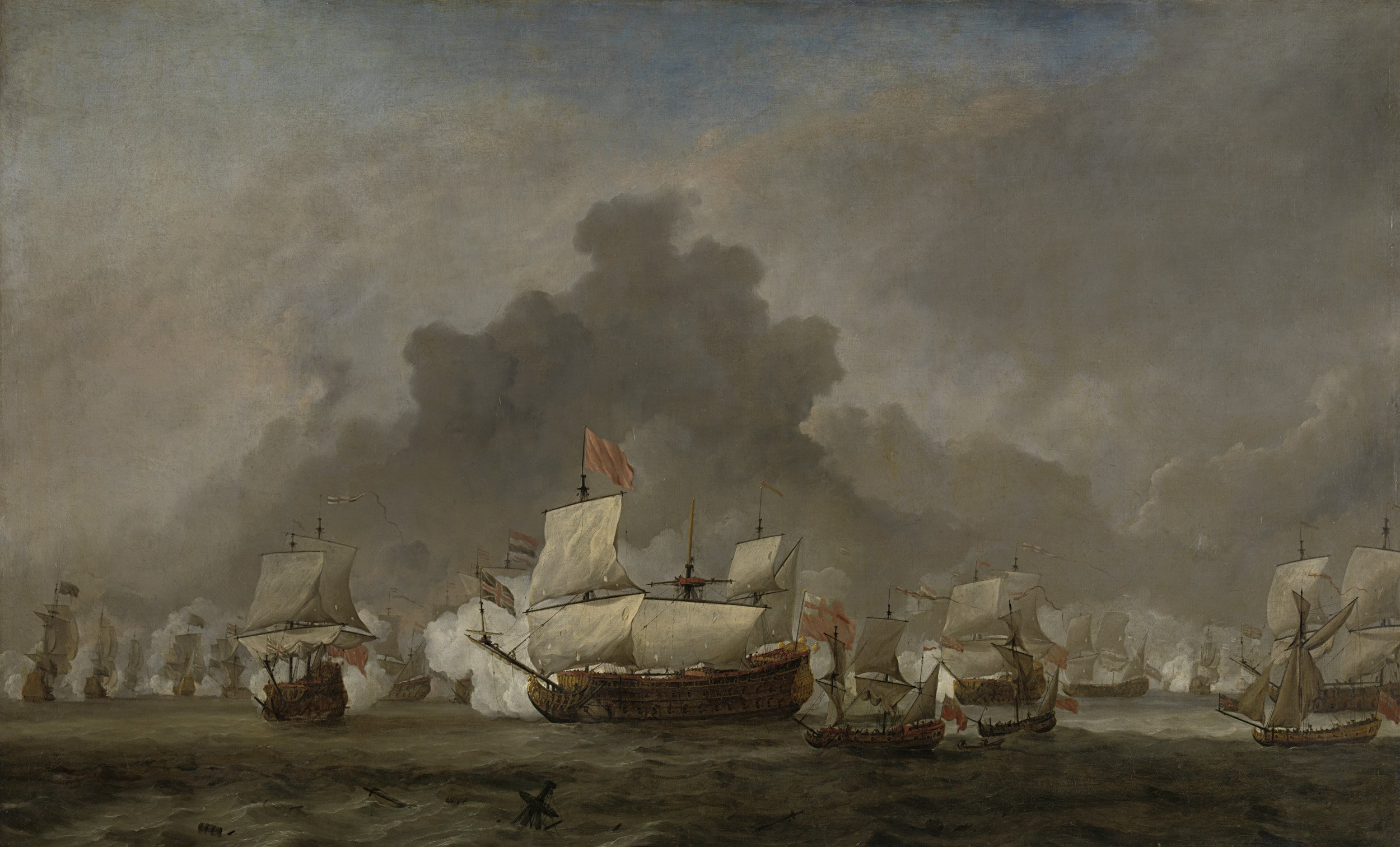
Duel of York and De Ruyter, by Van de Velde. Prince has lost her main-topmast, making her difficult to control and fallen rigging is hampering working the guns on the upper deck.

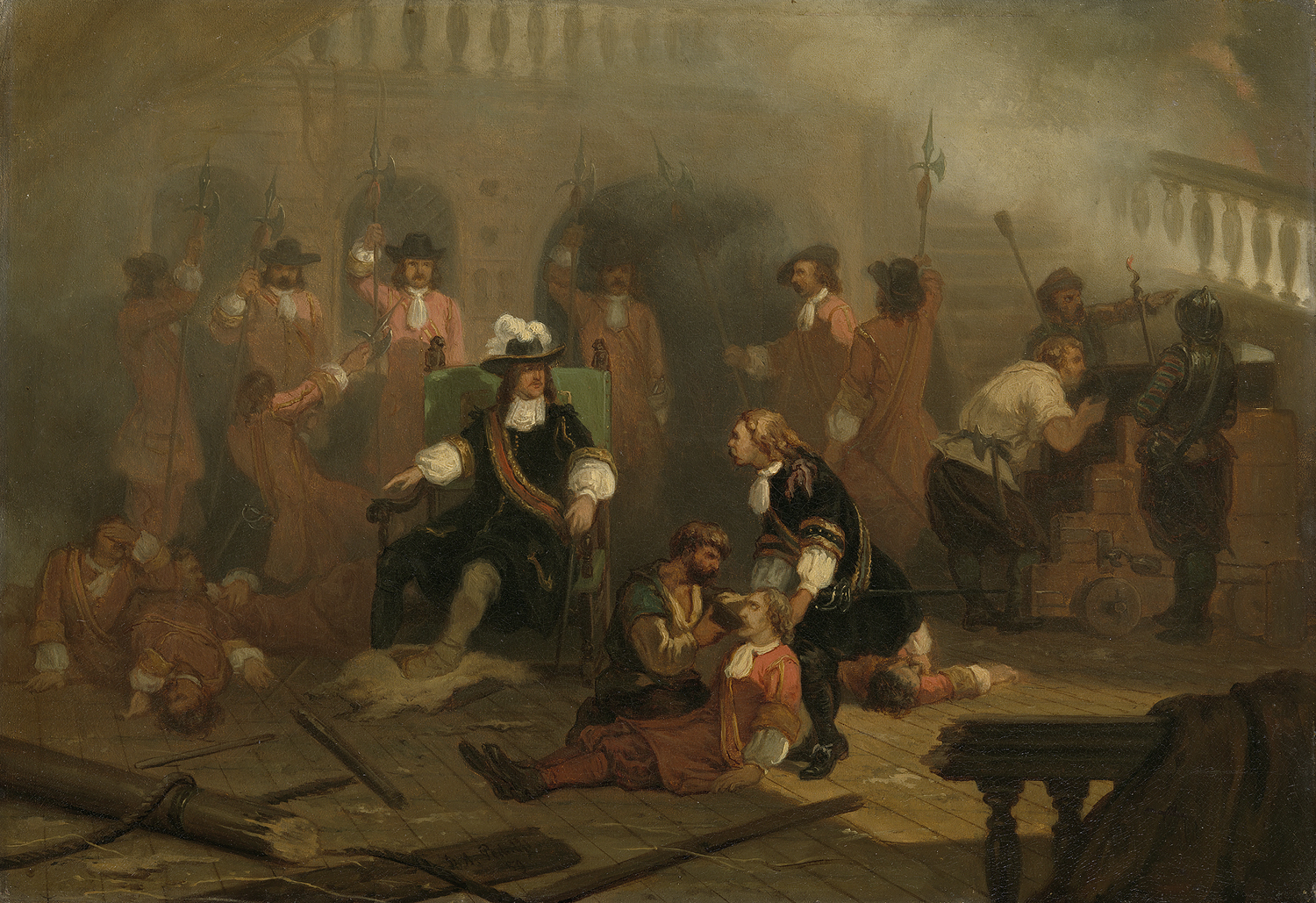
Cornelis de Witt watches the battle on board of De Zeven Provinciën

De Ruyter had employed a new formation, creating from the various squadrons under Jan van Brakel a "forlorn hope" squadron of 18 ships and 18 fireships, which was to attack the enemy ahead of the main force and attempt to cause confusion with its fireships. However, this failed, and the battle had to be fought between the main squadrons. Having the weather gauge, De Ruyter attacked the enemy around 8 a.m. at full speed. He himself directing his attack against the middle squadron as usual. The Duke of York, who commanded the Allied middle squadron, and De Ruyter fiercely bombarded each other. York was forced to move his flag twice, finally to London, as his flagships Prince and St Michael were taken out of action. Prince was crippled by De Ruyter's flagship De Zeven Provinciën in a two-hour duel. De Ruyter was accompanied by the representative of the States-General of the Netherlands, Cornelis de Witt (the brother of Grand Pensionary Johan de Witt) who bravely remained seated on the main deck, although half of his guard of honour standing next to him was killed or wounded.

In the meantime Banckert had taken on the French squadron under Estrées, which flew the white flag. The French, quite far away from the English squadrons, steered south followed by Banckert. They fiercely exchanged fire throughout the day, inflicting severe damage on each other without significantly influencing the battle's outcome. This later led to various speculations about the actual separation of the two squadrons, with many wrongly attributing it to secret mutual agreements or Estrées' reluctance to participate more fully in the battle, possibly related to a supposed mission to weaken the two great maritime powers against each other. (Note: Mahan comments in defense of Estrées manoevre: "...both the English and Ruyter thought that the French rather avoided than sought close action. Had Estrées, however, gone about, and attempted to break through the line of experienced Dutchmen to windward of him with the still raw seamen of France, the result would have been as disastrous as that which overtook the Spanish admiral at the battle of St. Vincent a hundred and twenty-five years later, when he tried to reunite his broken fleet by breaking through the close order of Jervis and Nelson.) Nevertheless, the Superbe was heavily damaged and des Rabesnières killed by fire from Enno Doedes Star's Groningen; total French casualties were about 450.

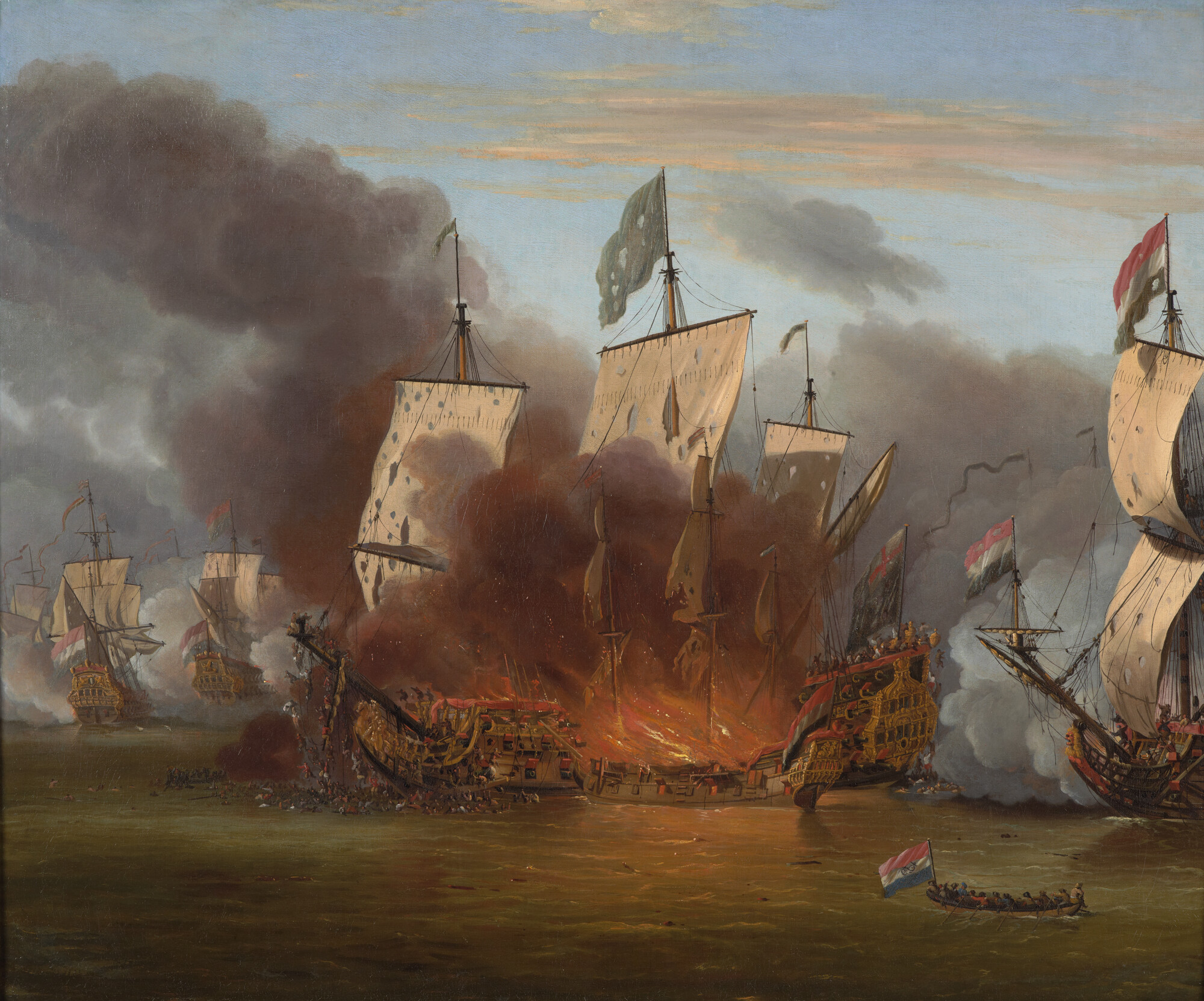
The Burning of the Royal James, by Van de Velde

The battle between squadrons of Sandwich and Van Ghent was no less bloody than that between those of York and De Ruyter. Here, too, the fiercest fighting took place between the admiral's ships and their "seconds." The flagship of Sandwich, HMS Royal James, was first fiercely engaged by Lieutenant-Admiral Van Ghent, who in 1667 had executed the Raid on the Medway, on Dolfijn. Van Brakel, who actually belonged to De Ruyter's squadron, took it upon himself to engage Sandwich's ship with Groot Hollandia to aid the heavily attacked Van Ghent. He incessantly pounded the hull of Royal James for over an hour and bringing her into such a condition that Lord Sandwich considered to strike his flag but decided against it because it was beneath his honour to surrender to a mere captain of low birth. Van Ghent was killed around 10 a.m. in this ship battle, and the desperate Sandwich, who could not board Groot Hollandia due to a lack of crew, finally managed to free himself from Van Brakel at low tide. But Royal James now drifted away, sinking, and was attacked by several fire ships. She sank two, but a third commanded by Van den Ryn, the same captain who had cut through the chain at the Medway, set the Royal James on fire. Its approach shielded by Vice-Admiral Isaac Sweers's Oliphant. After nine-tenths of its thousand crew members had been killed or wounded Sandwich, abandoned by part of his own squadron under Joseph Jordan, who had engaged vice admiral Volckert Schram's division, remained on his burning ship until he met his death in the waves. He and his son-in-law Philip Carteret drowned trying to escape when his sloop collapsed under the weight of panicked sailors jumping in; his body washed ashore, only recognisable by the scorched clothing still showing the shield of the Order of the Garter. The battle continued for hours, with Van Panhuys, Van Ghent's captain, flying his flag on De Witt's express orders to prevent panic. Despite this, the death of the lieutenant admiral soon became known, causing significant disruption in his squadron.

In the centre Lieutenant-Admiral Aert Jansse van Nes aboard Eendracht first duelled Vice-Admiral Edward Spragge on HMS London and then was attacked by HMS Royal Katherine. The latter ship was then so heavily damaged that Captain John Chicheley struck her flag and was taken prisoner; the Dutch prize crew however got drunk on the brandy found and allowed the ship to be later recaptured by the English. Van Ghent's death presented a formidable challenge for De Ruyter, who was now also under attack from some of the ships from Sandwich's squadron commanded by Jordan. Meanwhile, York had to transfer from the damaged St Michael to the London, Spragge's flagship, due to severe leaks. The battle centered on the two middle squadrons. The two fleets, under light winds, drifted southward along the banks of Lowestoft and as far as Aldbrough, engaged in intense and chaotic combat. By late evening, De Ruyter managed to maneuver behind the English centre. He now headed toward Banckert, while York maneuvered towards Estrées. During this maneuver, De Ruyter encountered a smaller vessel, Rainbow, commanded by Captain James Storey, which he left severely damaged after a brief skirmish. (Note: Mahan comments: "The truth ... is that the Duke of York, though a fair seaman, and a brave man, was not an able one; that his fleet was not in good order and was thus surprised; that his orders beforehand were not so precise as to make the French admiral technically disobedient in taking the opposite tack from the commander-in-chief, and so separating the squadrons; and that Ruyter profited most ably by the surprise he had himself prepared, and by the further opportunity given him by the ineptness of his enemies.")

Around 9 p.m., with the onset of darkness, the battle ended, remaining largely undecided, although the Allied fleet had suffered far more damage. The Battle of Solebay, according to De Ruyter himself, "was sharper and more prolonged" than any naval battle he had ever witnessed. Losses had also been heavy on the Dutch side: one Dutch ship, Jozua, was destroyed and another, Stavoren, captured, a third Dutch ship, Wassenaer, had an accident during repairs immediately after the battle and blew up.

In a strategic sense, it was however a clear Dutch victory as it deterred Anglo-French plans to blockade Dutch ports and land troops on the Dutch coast. (Note: Admiral Mahan commented: "The substantial results of Solebay fight were wholly favorable to the Dutch. The allied fleets were to have assisted the operations of the French army by making a descent on the coast of Zealand. Ruyter's attack had inflicted an amount of damage, and caused an expenditure of ammunition, which postponed the sailing of the fleet for a month; it was a diversion, not only important, but vital in the nearly desperate condition to which the United Provinces were reduced ashore. It may be added, as an instructive comment on the theory of commerce-destroying, that after this staggering check to the enemy's superior forces, Ruyter met and convoyed safely to port a fleet of Dutch merchantmen".) Tactically both sides sustained heavy damages; two English ships were sunk, including the fleet's flagship the Royal James, as well as two French ships sunk. The Dutch also lost two large ships, in addition to many fire ships.

The fleets met again at the Battle of Schooneveld in 1673.

== Gallery ==
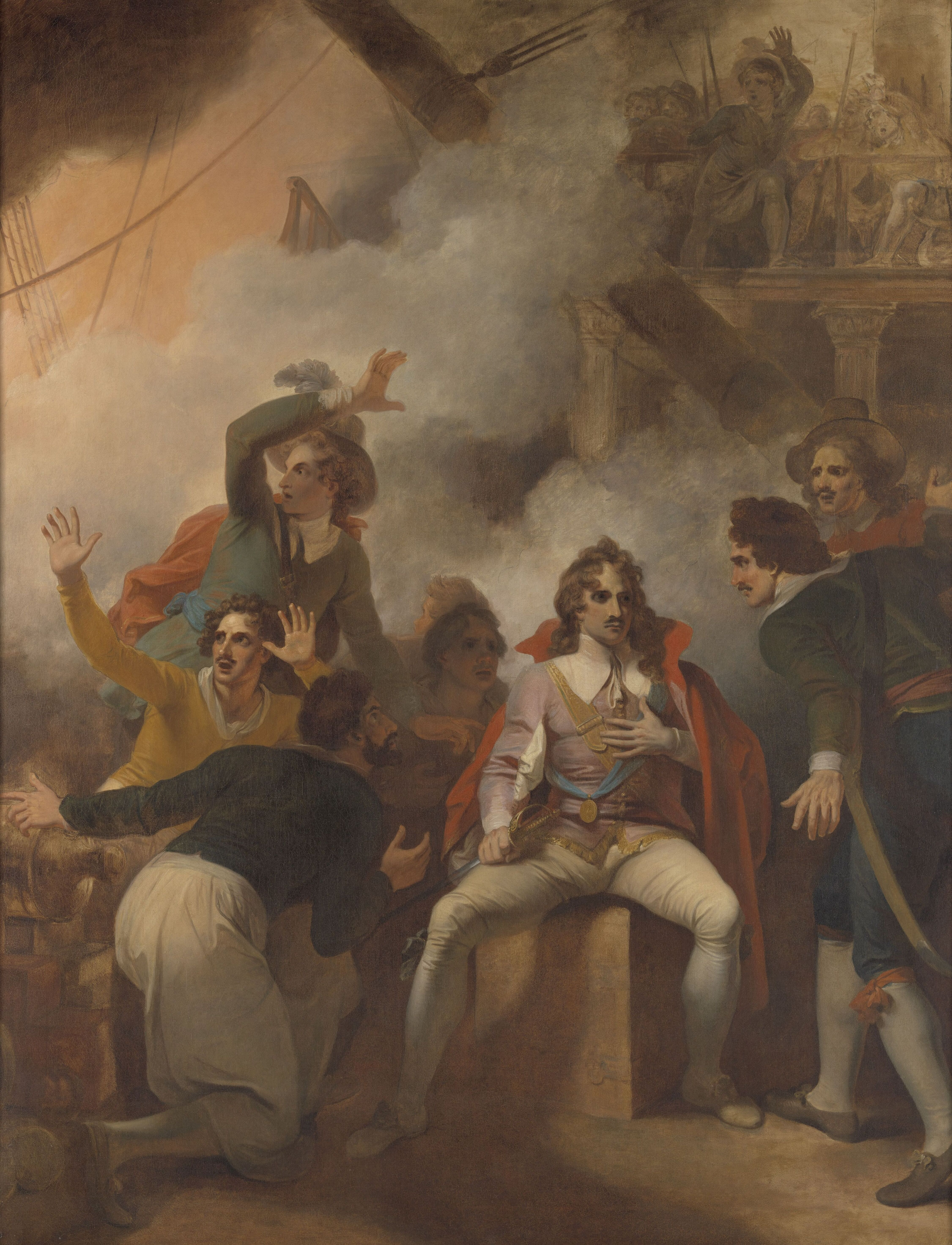
The Earl of Sandwich refusing to abandon his ship during the battle

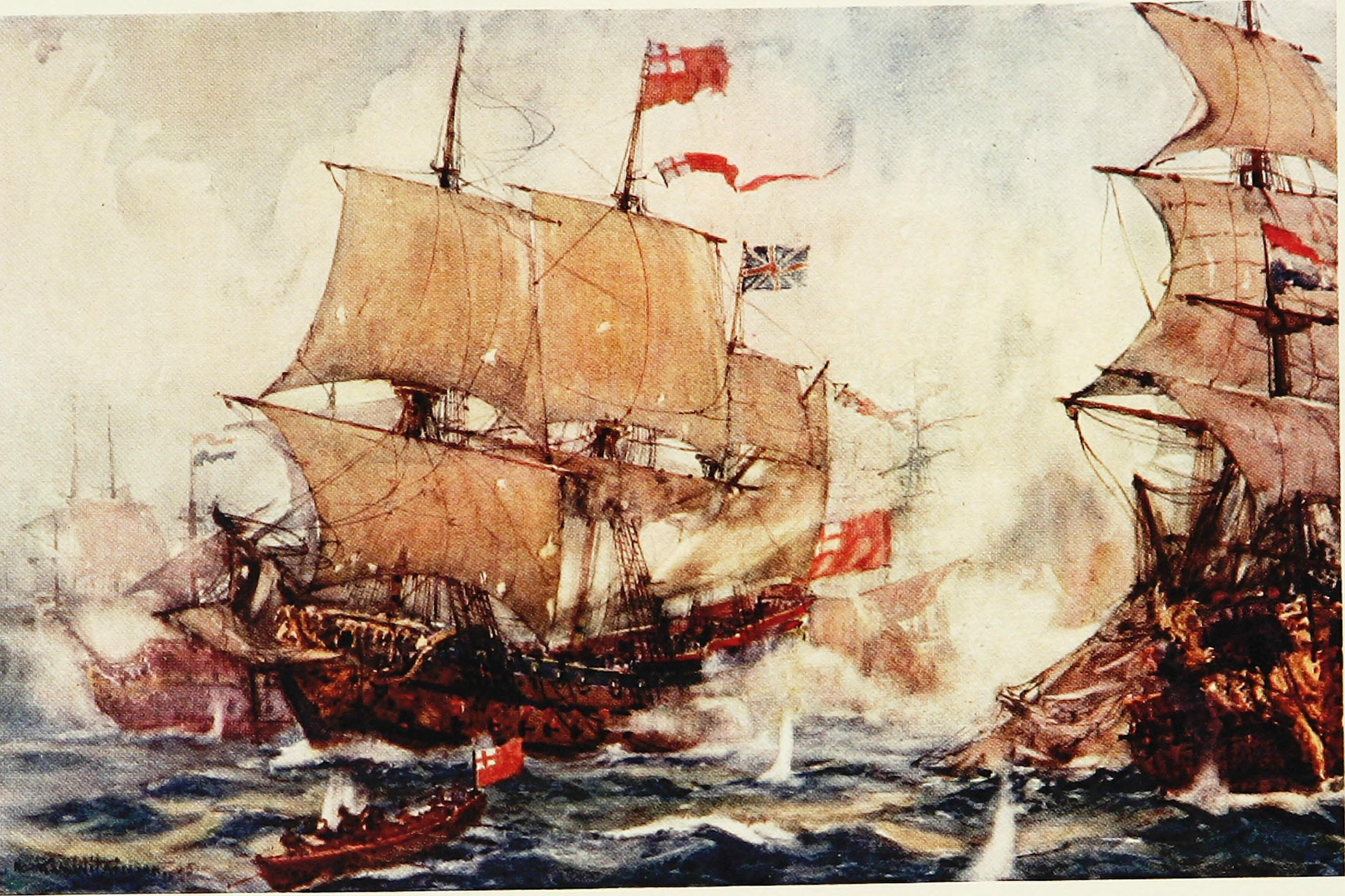

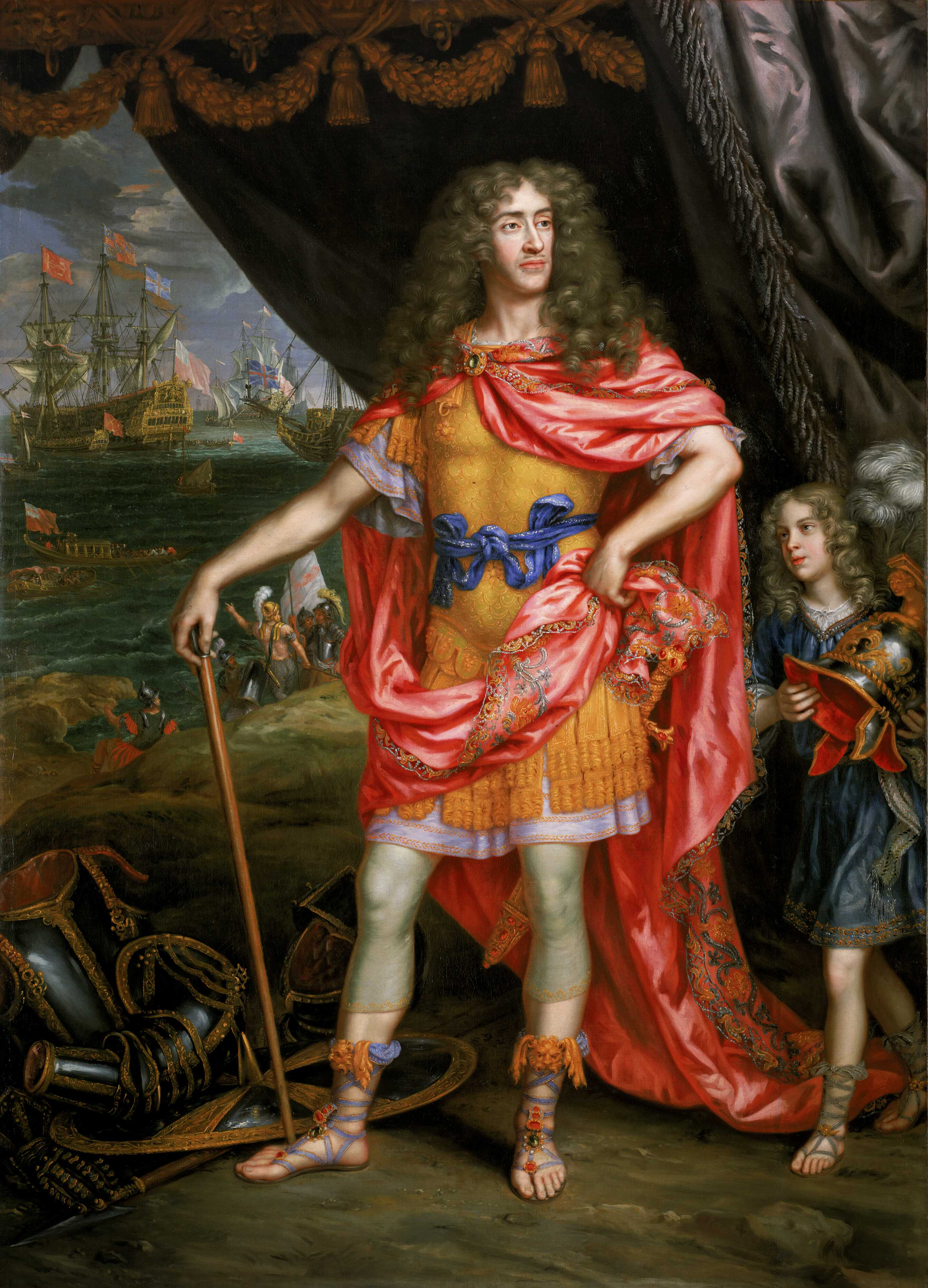
Portrait of James, Duke of York by Henri Gascar, 1673. York's flagship Prince can be seen in the background.

== Ship list ==
Not all fireships are listed; there were about 24 of them on the Allied, 36 on the Dutch side.

=== England and France (The Duke of York and Albany) ===
White Squadron (French)	Guns	Captain
Terrible	70	(Rear Admiral Abraham Duquesne)
Illustre	70	Marquis de Grancey
Conquérant	70	M. de Thivas
Admirable	68	M. de Beaulieu
Téméraire	50	M. de Larson
Prince	50	Charles Davy, Marquis d'Amfreville
Bourbon	50	M. de Kervin
Vaillant	50	Chevalier de Nesmond
Alcion	46	M. Bitaut de Beor
Hasardeux	38	M. de la Vigerie
Saint Phillippe	78	(Vice Admiral Jean d'Estrées, Count of Estrées; cp. M. Pierre de Cou)
Foudroyant	70	M. Louis Gabaret
Grand	70	M. Gombaud
Tonnant	58	M. Des Ardents
Brave	54	Chevalier Jean-Baptiste de Valbelle
Aquilon	50	Chevalier d'Hally
Duc	50	Chevalier de Sepville
Oriflamme	50	M. de Kerjean
Excellent	50	M. de Magnon
Eole	38	Chevalier de Cogolin
Arrogant	38	M. de Villeneuve-Ferriere
Superbe	70	(Chef d'escadre Des Rabesnières, killed in battle)
Invincible	70	Comodorre de Verdille
Sans-Pareil	66	M. de la Clocheterie
Fort	60	Comte de Benac
Sage	50	M. Anne Hilarion de Contentin, Comte de Tourville
Heureux	50	M. Francois Panetie
Rubis	46	M. de Saint Aubin d'Infreville
Galant	46	Chevalier de Flacourt
Hardi	38	M. de la Roque-Garseval
Red Squadron (English)	Guns	Captain
London	96	(Vice Admiral Edward Spragge)
Old James	70	John Haywood
Resolution	70	John Berry
Dunkirk	60	Francis Courtney
Monck	60	Bernard Ludman, killed in battle
Monmouth	70	Richard Beach
Royal Katherine	86	John Chicheley
Dreadnought	62	Arthur Herbert, 1st Earl of Torrington
Adventure	44	John Tyrwhit
Dartmouth	32	Richard Sadlington
Supply (fireship)	6	
Prince	100	(James Stuart, Duke of York and Albany, Lord High Admiral; First Captain John Cox, killed in battle, Second Captain John Narborough)
St Michael	96	Sir Robert Holmes
Victory	82	Thomas Butler, Earl of Ossory
Cambridge	70	Frescheville Holles, killed in battle
York	64	Thomas Elliot, killed in battle
Fairfax	60	George Legge
Yarmouth	54	Robert Werden
Portland	50	Thomas Guy
Diamond	50	Thomas Foulis
Phoenix	40	Richard Le Neve
Robert (fireship)	4	Richard Collins
Charles	96	(Rear Admiral Sir John Harman)
Rainbow	64	James Storey
Revenge	62	John Hart Sr.
Greenwich	60	Levi Greene
Anne	58	John Waterworth, killed in battle
Advice	50	Dominick Nugent
Dover	48	Sir John Ernle (or Ernley)
Forester	40	Henry Killigrew
Blue Squadron (English)	Guns	Captain
St Andrew	96	(Rear Admiral John Kempthorne)
French Ruby	80	Thomas R. Cole
St George	70	Jeffrey Pearce, killed in battle
Warspite	70	Richard White
Gloucester	62	William Coleman
Bonaventure	48	Richard Trevanion
Antelope	48	Gustavus Horne
Success (fireship)	6	George Watson
Royal James	100	(Admiral Sir Edward Montagu, Earl of Sandwich (killed in battle); Captain Richard Haddock)
Henry	82	Francis Digby, killed in battle
Edgar	72	John Wetwang
Rupert	66	John Holmes
Montagu	62	Thomas Darcy
Leopard	54	Peter Bowen
Crown	48	William Finch
Falcon	40	Charles Montague
Alice & Francis (fireship)	2	George Yennes, killed in battle
Royal Sovereign	100	(Vice Admiral Sir Joseph Jordan)
Triumph	74	Willoughby Hannam, killed in battle
Unicorn	68	Richard James
Mary	62	John Brooks
Plymouth	60	Sir Roger Strickland
Princesse	54	Sir Richard Munden
Ruby	48	Stephen Pyend
Mary Rose	48	William Davies
Tyger	44	John Turner

=== The Netherlands (Michiel de Ruyter) ===
Admiralty of Amsterdam	Guns	Captain
Akerboom	60	Jacob Teding van Berkhout
Woerden	70	Jacob Binckes
Jaersveld	48	Nicolaes de Boes
Stad Utrecht	66	Jan Davidszoon Bondt
Callantsoog	70	Hendrik Brouwer
Stavoren	48	Daniël Elsevier
Amsterdam	60	Anske Fokkes
Provincie van Utrecht	60	Jan Pauluszoon van Gelder
Dolphijn	82	Lt-Admiral Willem Joseph, Baron van Ghent (killed in battle), Flag-Cpt Michiel Kindt
Gouda	72	Schout-bij-Nacht Jan de Haan
Leeuwen	50	Jan Gijsels van Lier
Reigersbergen	72	Commodore Jacob van Meeuwen
Gideon	58	Pieter Middelandt
Essen	50	Philips de Munnik
Waesdorp	72	Francois Palm
Steenbergen	68	Jan Roetering
Deventer	60	Engel de Ruyter
Agatha	50	Pieter Corneliszoon de Sitter
Oosterwijk	60	Volckert Hendrikszoon Swart
Olifant	82	Vice-Admiral Isaac Sweers
Beschermer	50	David Swerius (Sweers)
Oudshoorn	70	Tomas Tobiaszoon
Komeetstar	70	Hendrik van Tol
Kruiningen	56	Balthazar van de Voorde
Edam (frigate)	32	Jacob Willemszoon Broeder
Bommel (frigate)	24	Pieter Klaaszoon Dekker
Asperen (frigate)	30	Barent Hals
Damiaten (frigate)	34	Jan Janszoon de Jongh
Popkensburg (frigate)	24	Mattheus Megank
Haas (frigate)	24	Hendrik Titus, Graaf van Nassau
Overijssel (frigate)	30	Cornelis Tijloos
Postijljon (frigate)	24	Roemer Vlacq
Brak (frigate)	24	Cornelis van der Zaan
Egmond (advice yacht)	10	Jan Bogaart
Triton (advice yacht)	12	Huibert Geel
Kater (advice yacht)	8	Jan Kramer
Walvis (advice yacht)	12	Jan Klaaszoon van Oosthuys
Eenhoorn (advice yacht)	10	Jacob Stadtlander
Kat (advice yacht)	12	Abraham Taelman
Galei (advice yacht)	12	Marcus Willemszoon
Velsen (fireship)	?	Hendrick Hendricksen
Windhond (fireship)	?	Willem Willemsen
Beemster (fireship)	?	Hendrick Rosaeus
Sollenburg (fireship)	?	Jan Janssen Bout
Draak (fireship)	?	Pieter van Grootveldt
Leydtstar (fireship)	?	Sybrant Barentsen
St. Salvador (fireship)	?	Andries Randel
Sollenburgh (fireship)	?	Klaas Pietersen Schuit
Admiralty of de Maze (Rotterdam)	Guns	Captain
De Zeven Provinciën	80	fleet flag, Lt-Admiral Michiel de Ruyter, 1st Lieutenant Gerard Callenburgh
Wassenaer	56	Philips van Almonde
Groot Hollandia	60	Jan van Brakel
Gelderland	64	Laurens Davidszoon van Convent
Zeelandia	44	Jan de Laucourt
Maagd van Dordrecht	68	Vice-Admiral Jan Evertszoon de Liefde
Reigersbergen	72	Jacob van Meeuwen
Schieland	60	Nicolaes Naalhout
Eendracht	76	Lt-Admiral Aert Janszoon van Nes
Ridderschap van Holland	66	Schout-bij-Nacht Jan Janszoon van Nes
Dordrecht	50	Barend Rees
Delft	62	Gerolf Ysselmuyden
Utrecht (frigate)	36	François van Aarssen
Schiedam (frigate)	20	François van Nijdek
Harderwijk (frigate)	24	Mozes Wichmans
Faam (advice yacht)	12	Cornelis Jacobszoon van der Hoeven
Rotterdam (advice yacht)	5	Wijnand van Meurs
Gorinchem (fireship)	4	Dirk de Munnik
Vrede (fireship)	2	Jan Daniëlszoon van den Rijn
Swol (fireship)	?	Abraham Schryver
Eenhoorn (fireship)	?	Pieter Besançon
Admiralty of the Noorderkwartier	Guns	Captain
Alkmaar	62	Klaas Anker
Wapen van Holland	44	Cornelis Jacobszoon de Boer
Jupiter	40	Jacob de Boer
Gelderland	56	Maarten Jacobszoon de Boer
Jozua	54	Jan Dick
Justina van Nassau	64	Jan Heck
Westfriesland	78	Johan Belgicus, Graaf van Hoorne
Wapen van Nassau	62	Peiter Kerseboom
Caleb	48	Jan Krook
Noorderkwartier	60	Jan Janszoon Maauw
Pacificatie	76	Vice-Admiral Volckert Schram
Drie Helden Davids	50	Claes Corneliszoon Valehen
Wapen van Medemblick	46	Hendrik Visscher
Wapen van Enkhuizen	72	Schout-bij-Nacht David Vlugh
Wapen van Hoorn	62	Claes Pieterszoon Wijnbergen
Helena Leonora (fireship)	?	Pieter Syvertsen Bokker
Admiralty of Zeeland	Guns	Captain
Walcheren	70	Lt-Admiral Adriaen Banckert
Kampveere	50	Adriaan van Cruiningen
Zierikzee	60	Vice-Admiral Cornelis Evertsen de Jonge
Zwanenburg	44	Cornelis Evertsen de Jongste
Middelburg	50	Willem Hendrikszoon
Oranje	70	Schout-bij-Nacht Jan Matthijszoon
Vlissingen	50	Salomon Le Sage
Visscher Harder (frigate)	26	Barent Martenszoon Boom
Delft (frigate)	34	Simon Loncke
Ter Goes (frigate)	34	Karel van der Putte
Bruinvisch (advice)	6	Cornelis Hollardt
Zeehond (advice)	?	Anteunis Matthijszoon
Zwaluw (advice)	6	Karel de Ritter
Middelburgh (fireship)	?	Willem Meerman
Prinsje (fireship)	?	Cornelis Ewout
Hoop (fireship)	?	Antony Janssen
Admiralty of Friesland	Guns	Captain
Elf Steden	54	Wytse Johannes Beyma
Prins Hendrik Casimir	70	Schout-bij-Nacht Hendrik Bruynsvelt
Westergo	56	Yde Hilkeszoon Kolaart
Groningen	70	Vice-Admiral Enno Doedes Star
Vredewold	60	Christiaan Ebelszoon Uma
Oostergo	62	Jan Janszoon Vijselaar
Windhond (frigate)	34	Joost Michelszoon Kuik
? (advice yacht)	?	snauw, Pieter Pauw

== In popular culture ==
- The battle is described in verse, as if in an eyewitness account seen from the coast at Dunwich, in the ballad "A Merry Song on the Duke's late glorious Success over the Dutch", which appears in print (apparently taken from a broadside ballad) in the Suffolk Garland of 1818.
- Leeds Central Library has a 50 ft (15m), step by step, pictorial record of the sea battle which dates from around 1910. It is based on contemporary parchments and also features scenes depicting the Battle of Texel. It forms part of the Gascoigne collection.
- The battle is described in the novel "An Affair of Dishonour" published in 1910 by William de Morgan who was also an artist in glass and ceramics. A wounded survivor becomes an important character in the story.
- The Battle of Solebay forms the historic background to children's adventure novel The Lion of Sole Bay, the fourth book in the Strong Winds series by Julia Jones
- The Adnams Brewery created a beer, named Broadside, in commemoration of the battle's tercentenary.

In his novel, “The Black Tulip”, Alexandre Dumas refers to the historical role of Cornelius de Witt in the battle. (Chapter 2, “The Two Brothers”)

== See also ==
- Seven ships of the Royal Navy have been named HMS Solebay after this battle.

== Sources ==
- Mahan, Alfred Thayer (1918). The Influence of Sea Power Upon History, 1660-1783. Little, Brown.
- Van Nimwegen, Olaf (2020). De Veertigjarige Oorlog 1672–1712: de strijd van de Nederlanders tegen de Zonnekoning [The 40 Years' War 1672–1712: the Dutch struggle against the Sun King] (in Dutch). Prometheus. ISBN 978-90-446-3871-4.
- Blok, P.J. (1928). Michiel de Ruyter (PDF) (in Dutch). Martinus Nijhof.
- The Battle of Solebay at ship-wrecks.co.uk
- Lynn, John A., The Wars of Louis XIV: 1667-1714 (Longman Publishing: Harlow, England, 1999).
- Narborough, John (1946) [1671-1672]. Anderson, R C (ed.). Journals and Narratives of the Third Dutch War. London: Navy Records Society.
