= List of ship launches in 1666 =

The list of ship launches in 1666 includes a chronological list of some ships launched in 1666.

| Date | Ship | Class | Builder | Location | Country | Notes |
|---|---|---|---|---|---|---|
| 8 January | Trident | Third rate | Laurent Hubac | Brest | Kingdom of France | For French Navy. |
| 26 January | Rupert | Third rate ship of the line | Anthony Deane, Harwich Dockyard | Harwich | England | For Royal Navy |
| 8 February | Breton | Third rate | Laurent Hubac | Brest | Kingdom of France | For French Navy. |
| 21 March | Sweepstakes | Fifth rate frigate | Edmund Edgar | Great Yarmouth | England | For Royal Navy. |
| 27 March | Defiance | Third rate ship of the line | William Castle | Deptford | England | for Royal Navy |
| April | Prince | Second rate ship of the line | Laurent Hubac | Brest | Kingdom of France | For French Navy. |
| 9 May | St Patrick | 50-gun fourth-rate ship of the line | Francis Baylie | Bristol | England | For Royal Navy |
| 7 June | Greenwich | Fourth rate | Christopher Pett, Woolwich Dockyard | Woolwich | England | For royal Navy. |
| 10 June | Loyal London | Second rate ship of the line | John Taylor | Deptford Dockyard | England | For Royal Navy |
| June | Sirène | Fourth rate | François Pomet | Toulon | Kingdom of France | For French Navy. |
| June | Cheval Marin | Fourth rate | Laurent Coulomb | Toulon | Kingdom of France | For French Navy. |
| June | Navarre | Third rate | Jean-Pierre Brun | Tonnay-Charente | Kingdom of France | For French Navy. |
| 24 July | Roebuck | Sixth rate frigate | Anthony Deane | Harwich | England | For Royal Navy. |
| July | Fanfan | Sixth rate ketch | Anthony Deane | Harwich | England | For Royal Navy. |
| August | Saint Charles | Fifth Rate | | Bayonne | Kingdom of France | For French Navy. |
| November | Conquérant | Conquérant-class ship of the line | | | Kingdom of France | For French Navy. |
| November | Tigre | Fourth rate | Jean Guichard | Soubise | Kingdom of France | For French Navy. |
| December | Courtisan | Third rate | J Gron | Amsterdam | Dutch Republic | For French Navy. |
| December | Normand | Conquérant-class ship of the line | François-Toussant Gréhan | Amsterdam | Dutch Republic | For French Navy. |
| December | Intrépide | Conquérant-class ship of the line | François-Toussant Gréhan | Amsterdam | Dutch Republic | For French Navy. |
| December | Invincible | Conquérant-class ship of the line | François-Toussant Gréhan | Amsterdam | Dutch Republic | For French Navy. |
| December | Neptune | Second rate | J Gron | Amsterdam | Dutch Republic | For French Navy. |
| Unknown date | Alkmaar | Third rate | Jacob Willemssen | Enkhuizen | Dutch Republic | For Dutch Republic Navy. |
| Unknown date | Bark | Sixth rate | | Dunkerque | Kingdom of France | For Dutch Republic Navy. |
| Unknown date | Brak | Fifth rate yacht | Jan van Rheenen | Amsterdam | Dutch Republic | For Dutch Republic Navy. |
| Unknown date | Burg | Unrated full-rigged ship | | Dunkerque | Kingdom of France | For Dutch Republic Navy. |
| Unknown date | Cambridge | Third rate ship of the line | Jonas Shish, Deptford Dockyard | Deptford | England | For Royal Navy |
| Unknown date | Delft | Third rate | Jan Salomonszoon van der Tempel | Rotterdam | Dutch Republic | For Dutch Republic Navy. |
| Unknown date | Dolfijn | First rate | | | Dutch Republic | For Dutch Republic Navy. |
| Unknown date | Domberg | Third rate | Pieter Leynssen | Vlissingen | Dutch Republic | For Dutch Republic Navy |
| Unknown date | Eendracht | First rate | Salomon Janszoon van der Tempel | Rotterdam | Dutch Republic | For Dutch Republic Navy. |
| Unknown date | Entendu | Fourth rate ship of the line | Brittany | Saint Malo | Kingdom of France | For French Navy. |
| Unknown date | Falcon | Fifth-rate frigate | Christopher Pest | Woolwich Dockyard | England | For Royal Navy. |
| Unknown date | Francis | Sixth-rate fireship | | | England | For Royal Navy. |
| Unknown date | Frédéric | Second rate ship of the line | Mathias | Copenhagen | Denmark | for French Navy. |
| Unknown date | Gekroonde Burgh | Third rate | Bastiaen Vogelaar | Zierikzee | Dutch Republic | For Dutch Republic Navy. |
| Unknown date | Gelderland | Second rate | Salomon Janszoon van der Tempel | Rotterdam | Dutch Republic | For Dutch Republic Navy. |
| Unknown date | Gouden Leeuw | First rate ship of the line | Jan van Rheenen | Amsterdam | Dutch Republic | For Admiralty of Amsterdam. |
| Unknown date | Greenwich | Fourth rate ship of the line | Christopher Pett | Woolwich Dockyard | England | For Royal Navy |
| Unknown date | Groningen | Second rate | | Groningen | Dutch Republic | For Dutch Republic Navy. |
| Unknown date | Jonge Prins | Third rate | Cornelis Janssen Olij | Medemblik | Dutch Republic | For Dutch Republic Navy. |
| Unknown date | Jupiter | 70-gun third-rate ship of the line | Henrik Bremer | Lübeck | Lübeck | For Royal Swedish Navy. |
| Unknown date | Kroonvogel | Unrated full-rigged ship | | Dunkerque | Kingdom of France | For Dutch Republic Navy. |
| Unknown date | Loyal George | Fourth rate | | England | England | For Dutch Republic Navy. |
| Unknown date | Maagd van Dordrecht | Second rate | Salomon Janszoon van der Tempel | Rotterdam | Dutch Republic | For Dutch Republic Navy. |
| Unknown date | Merlin | 8-gun yacht | Jonas Shish | Rotherhithe | England | For Royal Navy |
| Unknown date | Olifant | First rate | Jan van Rheenen, Amsterdam Naval Yard | Amsterdam | Dutch Republic | For Dutch Republic Navy. |
| Unknown date | Oranje | Third rate | Adriaen Kakelaer | Veere | Dutch Republic | For Dutch Republic Navy. |
| Unknown date | Oud Harlem | Unrated full-rigged ship | | Dunkerque | Kingdom of France | For Dutch Republic Navy. |
| Unknown date | Pauw | Unrated full-rigged ship | | Dunkerque | Kingdom of France | For Dutch Republic Navy. |
| Unknown date | Postiljon | Sixth rate | Jan van Rheenen | Amsterdam | Dutch Republic | For Dutch Republic Navy. |
| Unknown date | Schieland | Third rate | Salomon Janszoon van der Tempel | Rotterdam | Dutch Republic | For Dutch Republic Navy. |
| Unknown date | Sneek | Third rate | | | Dutch Republic | For Dutch Republic Navy. |
| Unknown date | Spes | Fourth rate ship of the line | | Stockholm | Sweden | For Royal Swedish Navy. |
| Unknown date | Tholen | Third rate | | Veere | Dutch Republic | For Dutch Republic Navy. |
| Unknown date | Wakende Kraan | Fourth rate | | | Dutch Republic | For Dutch Republic Navy. |
| Unknown date | Warspite | Third rate ship of the line | Johnson, Blackwall Yard | Blackwall | England | For Royal Navy |
| Unknown date | Wassenaer | Third Rate | Jan Salomonszoon van der Tempel | Rotterdam | Dutch Republic | For Dutch Republic Navy. |
| Unknown date | Westfriesland | Second rate | | | Dutch Republic | For Dutch Republic Navy. |
| Unknown date | Zevenwolden | Second rate | | Harlingen | Dutch Republic | For Dutch Republic Navy. |
