= Battle of Southwold Bay =

The Battle of Southwold Bay off the Suffolk coast can refer to any of a number of exchanges in the Second and Third Anglo-Dutch Wars, namely

- 13 June 1665 - Battle of Lowestoft
- 7 June 1672 - Battle of Solebay
