= English ship Yarmouth (1653) =

Ship of the line of the Royal Navy

History

England
- Name: Yarmouth
- Ordered: 27 December 1652
- Builder: Edmund Edgar, Great Yarmouth
- Launched: 1653
- Fate: Broken up, 1680

General characteristics
- Class & type: 44-gun fourth-rate frigate
- Length: 105 ft (32.0 m) (keel)
- Beam: 33 ft (10.1 m)
- Depth of hold: 13 ft 3 in (4.0 m)
- Sail plan: Full-rigged ship
- Armament: 44 guns (1660); 54 guns (1677)

Yarmouth was a 44-gun fourth-rate frigate of the English Royal Navy, originally built for the navy of the Commonwealth of England at Great Yarmouth under the 1652 Programme, and launched in 1653. By 1666 her original armament of 44 guns (24-pounders on the lower deck, and a mixture of culverins and demi-culverins on the upper deck) had been increased to 52 guns by the addition of smaller cannon (sakers) on the quarterdeck, and by 1677 she carried 54 guns.

Yarmouth took part in the Battle of Lowestoft in 1665, in the Four Days Battle and the St James's Day Fight in 1666, in the Battle of Solebay in 1672 and in the Battle of Schooneveld and Battle of Texel in 1673. She was broken up in 1680.
