= Jan Jansse van Nes =

Dutch admiral

Jan Jansz. van Nes
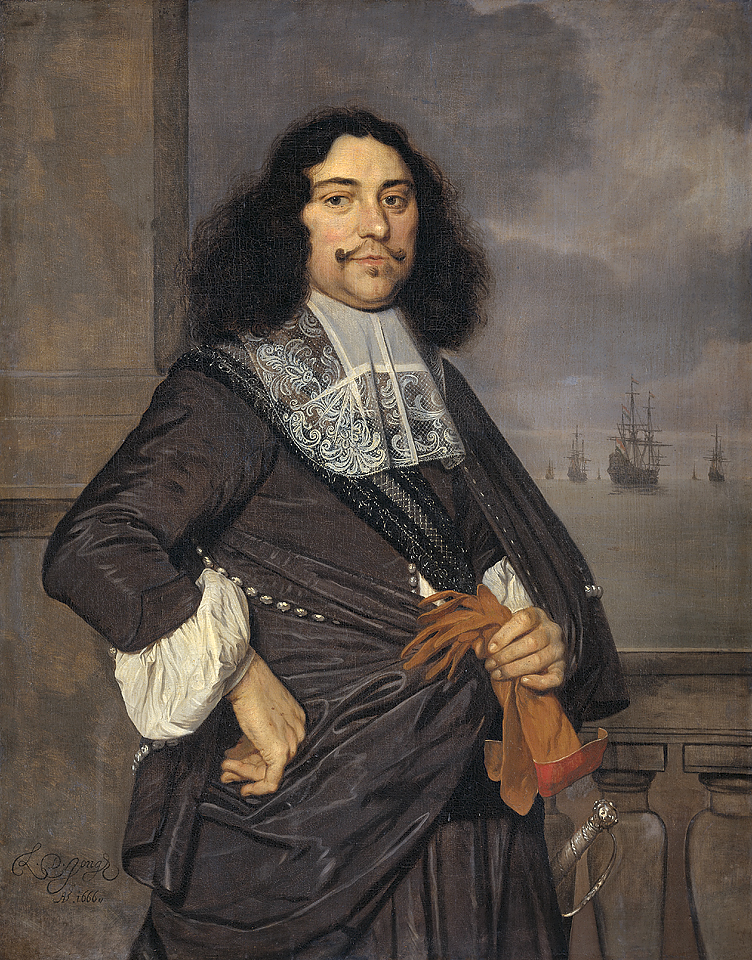
- Portrait by Ludolf de Jongh, 1666
- Born: Jan Janszoon van Nes; 26 April 1631; Rotterdam, Dutch Republic
- Died: c. June 1680 (aged 49); Rotterdam, Dutch Republic
- Relatives: Aert van Nes (brother)
- Military career
- Allegiance: Dutch Republic
- Branch: Dutch States Navy
- Years of service: 1652–1680
- Rank: Vice admiral
- Wars: First Anglo-Dutch War; Northern War of 1655–1660; Second Anglo-Dutch War; Third Anglo-Dutch War

Jan Janszoon van Nes (26 April 1631 – c. June 1680) was a Dutch admiral and brother of naval commander Aert Janszoon van Nes. They both took part in the Raid on the Medway of 1667. He was buried in the St. Lawrence Church in Rotterdam.

== Bibliography ==
- Moquette, H. (1914). "Nes, Jan Jansz. van". Nieuw Nederlandsch Biografisch Woordenboek (in Dutch). Vol. 3. Leiden: Sijthoff. pp. 907–908. OCLC 277609357.
- Van der Aa, A. J. (1868). "Nes, Jan Jansse van". Biographisch Woordenboek der Nederlanden (in Dutch). Vol. 13. Haarlem: Brederode. pp. 133–135. OCLC 841646809.
