= Ridderschap van Holland =

Ridderschap van Holland (Dutch - "Knighthood of Holland") is a name that has been held by various Dutch naval and merchant ships, including:

- Ridderschap van Holland, Dutch naval ship, 64/66 guns, Vice-Admiral Johan de Liefde's flagship at the Four Days' Battle of 1666, captained by Schout-bij-Nacht Jan Jansse van Nes at the 1672 Battle of Solebay, by Eland du Bois at the 1673 Battle of Texel, and by Philips van Almonde in the 1674 actions against the French west coast
- Ridderschap van Holland, 72 guns, present at the Battles of Barfleur and La Hogue
- Ridderschap van Holland (1682), Dutch East India Company merchantman, launched 1682, lost at sea 1694

The name refers to the "Knighthood" Estate within the States of Holland; it would be shortened to Ridderschap.
