= HMS London (1670) =

Ship of the line of the Royal Navy

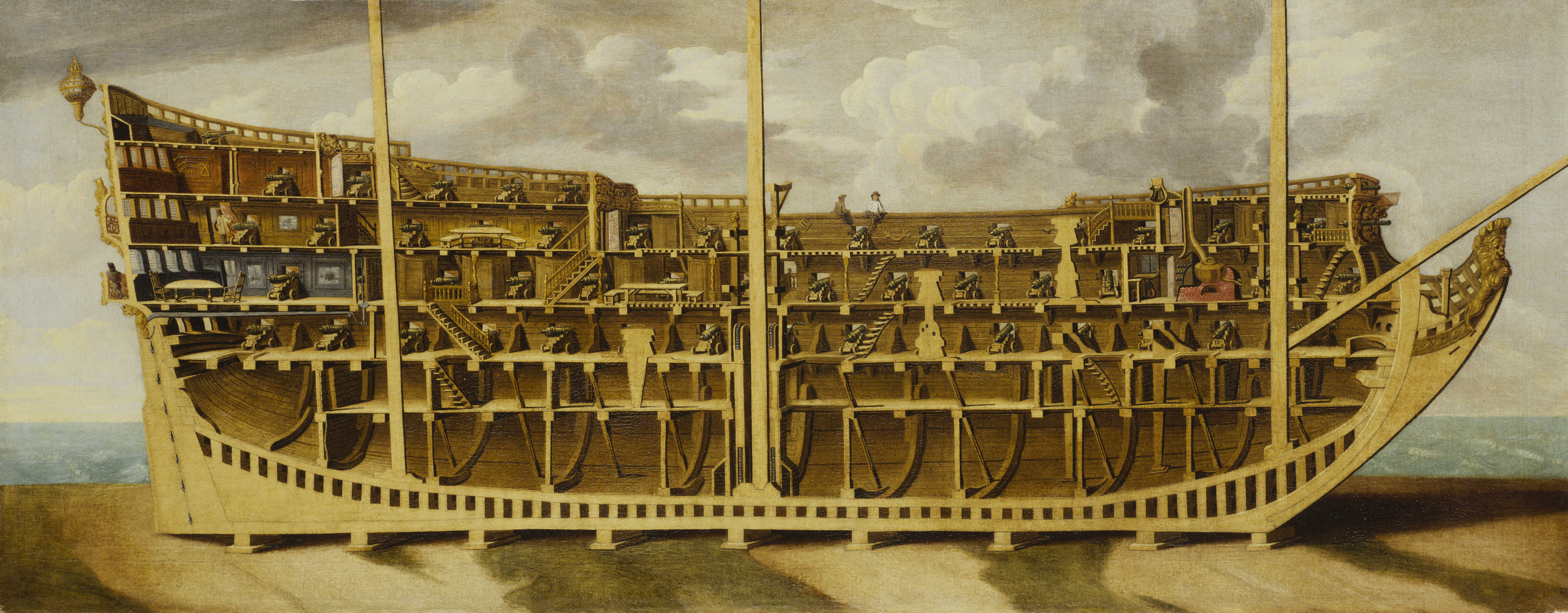
- This painting is thought to be of the London after her 1679 rebuild, taken from a sketch attributed to Thomas Phillips

History

Great Britain
- Name: HMS London
- Builder: Christopher Pett and Jonas Shish, Deptford Dockyard
- Launched: 25 July 1670
- Honours and awards: Battle of Texel 21 August 1673
- Fate: Broken up, 1747

General characteristics as built
- Class & type: 96-gun first-rate ship of the line
- Tons burthen: 1328 tons
- Length: 129 ft (39 m) (keel)
- Beam: 44 ft (13 m)
- Depth of hold: 19 ft (5.8 m)
- Propulsion: Sails
- Sail plan: Full-rigged ship
- Armament: 96 guns of various weights of shot

General characteristics after 1706 rebuild
- Class & type: 100-gun first-rate ship of the line
- Tons burthen: 1685 tons
- Length: 168 ft (51 m) (gundeck)
- Beam: 48 ft (15 m)
- Depth of hold: 19 ft 2 in (5.84 m)
- Propulsion: Sails
- Sail plan: Full-rigged ship
- Armament: 100 guns of various weights of shot

HMS London was a 96-gun first-rate ship of the line of the Royal Navy, built by Christopher Pett at Deptford Dockyard until his death in March 1668, and completed by Jonas Shish and launched in 1670.

She was rebuilt at Chatham Dockyard in 1706 as a 100-gun first rate. In 1721 London was enlarged slightly, giving her a tonnage of 1711 bm. She was broken up in 1747.
