= HMS Solebay =

Eight ships of the Royal Navy have been named HMS Solebay after the battle of Solebay on 7 June 1672, the first battle of the Third Anglo-Dutch War.

- HMS Solebay (1694) was a 24-gun sixth rate launched in 1694. She was wrecked in 1709 on Boston Rock, Lyme Regis.
- HMS Solebay (1711) was a 24-gun sixth rate launched in 1711. She was converted to a 6-gun bomb vessel in 1726, an 8-gun fireship in 1734 and a 20-gun sixth rate in 1735. She became a guard ship in 1736, a hospital ship in 1742 and was sold in 1748.
- HMS Solebay (1742) was a 20-gun sixth rate launched in 1742. She was captured by the French in 1744, recaptured by the British in 1746 and was sold into mercantile service in 1763.
- HMS Solebay (1763) was a 28-gun Mermaid-class sixth rate launched in 1763. She was wrecked in 1782.
- HMS Solebay (1785) was a 32-gun fifth rate launched in 1785 and wrecked in 1809. Along with HMS Derwent, they were the first ships in the West Africa Squadron that the British government had established to interdict and end the Trans Atlantic Slave Trade.
- HM Hired armed ship Solebay, a hired armed ship in service in 1801.
- HMS Solebay was a 32-gun fifth rate launched in 1783 as HMS Iris. Iris was renamed Solebay in 1809, converted to a receiving ship in 1811, lent to the Marine Society in 1815 and broken up in 1833.
- HMS Solebay was to have been an Algerine-class minesweeper. She was laid down in 1942, but renamed HMS Skipjack later that year.
- HMS Solebay (D70) was a Battle-class destroyer launched in 1944 and broken up in 1967.
