= Dutch ship Eendracht (1655) =

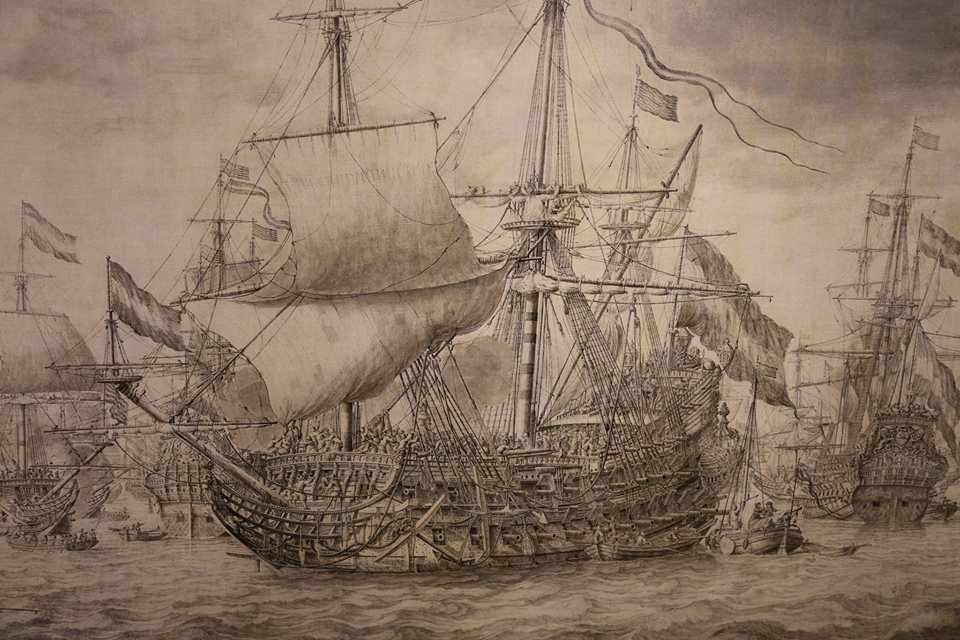
- Portrait of Eendracht by Willem van de Velde the Elder

History

Dutch Republic
- Name: Eendracht
- Builder: Jan Salomonszoon van den Tempel, Dordrecht
- Completed: January 1655
- Fate: Blown up at the Battle of Lowestoft on 13 June 1665

General characteristics
- Class & type: 58-gun ship of the line
- Length: 150 Amsterdam feet (42.5 m (139 ft))
- Beam: 38 Amsterdam feet (10.8 m (35 ft))
- Depth of hold: 15 Amsterdam feet (4.2 m (14 ft))
- Propulsion: Sails
- Sail plan: Full-rigged ship
- Complement: 300 sailors and 75 soldiers
- Armament: 58 guns (later 72 guns)

The Eendracht or Eendragt ("Concord" - more precisely translated as "Unity") was the flagship of the confederate navy of the United Provinces (a precursor state of the Netherlands) between 1655 and 1665. Eendragt was the more common spelling in the 17th century; Eendracht is the modern Dutch standard spelling.

Lieutenant-Admiral Maarten Tromp had for many years insisted on the construction of a new flagship to replace the Brederode, which was too lightly armed with only 56 guns. For reasons of cost and impracticality (Dutch home waters being very shallow) this was refused until the events of the First Anglo-Dutch War made it painfully clear that much heavier ships were needed. In February 1653 it was decided that the cost was to be shared confederately by the seven provinces of the Netherlands. The project was at the instigation of Cornelis de Witt moved to the wharf of Goossen Schacks van der Arent in Dordrecht for a ship to be built under the supervision of shipwright Jan Salomonszoon van den Tempel who had previously designed Brederode and the earlier flagship Aemilia. The Admiralty of de Maze based in Rotterdam (one of the five autonomous Dutch admiralties) therefore signed a contract with van den Tempel on 8 March 1653 and he then laid the keel of a ship of 150 (Amsterdam) feet (42.5 m) in length.

Due to conflicts about cost, size and materials, Eendracht was only finished in January 1655 when the First Anglo-Dutch War had already ended and Tromp was dead. At first it was intended to name the then 58-gun ship Prins Willem after the infant son of the late stadtholder William II of Orange, but Johan de Witt, Grand Pensionary with the States of Holland, decided to rename the project after the main ideal of his domestic policy: the concord between all provinces and citizens, also expressed in the official motto of the Republic: Concordia res parvae crescunt, "Small things grow through concord". When he happened to be absent for a month the Orangist faction changed the name back, but the States hurriedly reverted this when De Witt after his return merely expressed his amazement.

== Service history ==
Initially the Eendracht mounted only 58 guns, comprising sixteen bronze 24-pdrs and twelve iron 12-pdrs on the lower deck, twenty iron 8-pdrs on the upper deck, and 10 bronze 6-pdrs on the quarterdeck. She became the flagship of Tromp's successor Lieutenant-Admiraal Jacob van Wassenaer Obdam. She took part in the expedition to Danzig in 1656, by when she had been increased to 68 guns, and she fought successfully in the Northern Wars, defeating the Swedish fleet in the Battle of the Sound on 8 November 1658, by which time she carried 72 guns.

By the start of the Second Anglo-Dutch War she had been re-armed to carry 72 guns, now comprising four 36-pdrs, twenty-six 24-pdrs, twenty 12-pdrs, eighteen 6-pdrs, and four 2-pdrs. In the Battle of Lowestoft on 13 June 1665, Eendracht, then armed with 73 guns, duelled the much heavier 80-gun English flagship Royal Charles. The Dutch chain shot killed a number of courtiers standing next to Lord High Admiral James Stuart on the English ship, but in the early afternoon Eendracht was hit in the powder room and exploded, killing Van Obdam. There were only five survivors out of the crew of 409. The Maas Amiralty promptly ordered a replacement 76-gun ship (of 160 Amsterdam feet (45.3 m (149 ft)) in length) to carry the same name; she was built at Rotterdam by Salomon Janszoon van den Tempel, son of the previous builder, and completed in time to take part in the battles in the summer of 1666.
