= Dutch ship Gouden Leeuw =

Dutch ship of the line

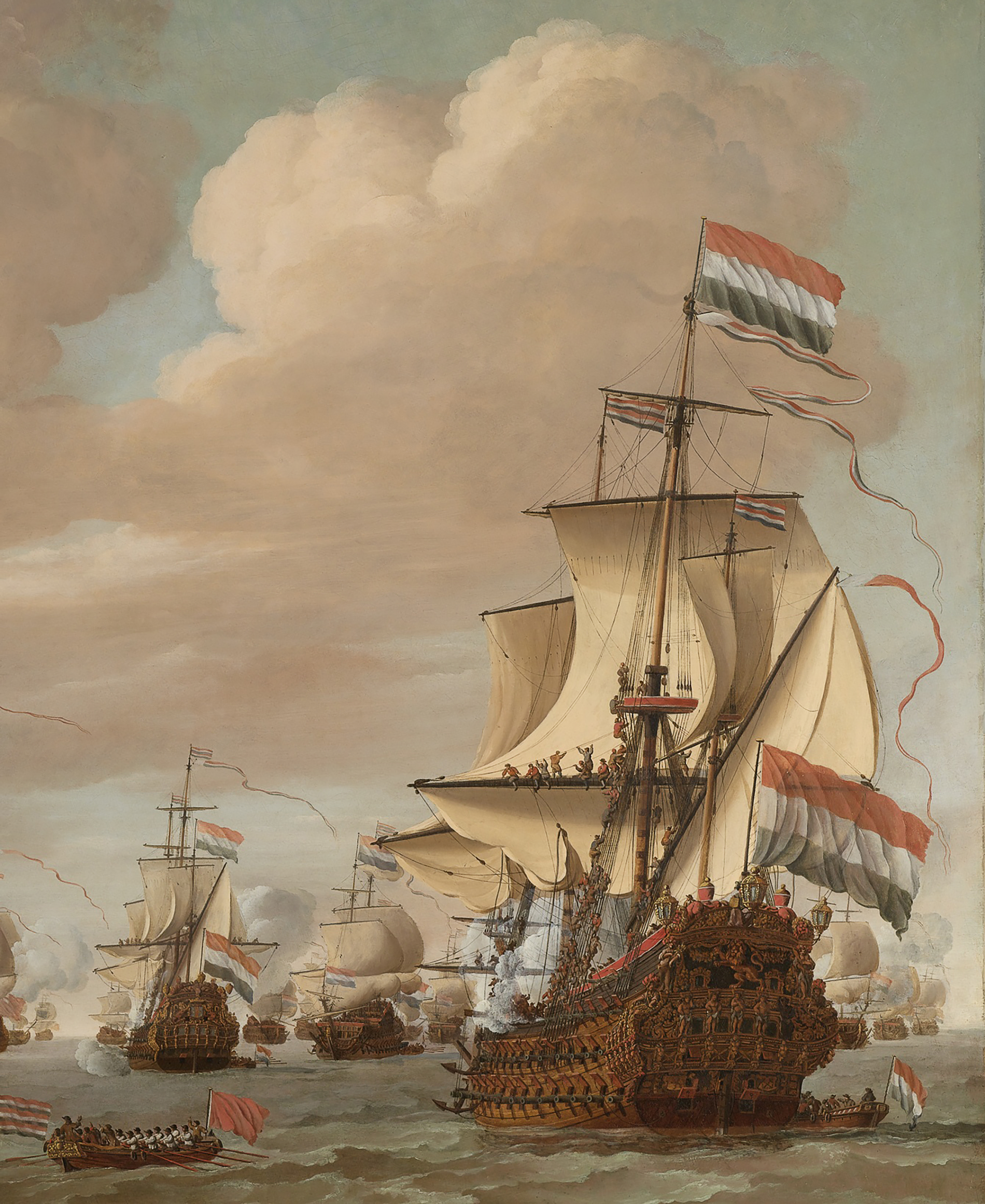
- De Gouden Leeuw, by Willem van de Velde the Elder

History

Dutch Republic
- Name: Gouden Leeuw
- Launched: 1666
- Fate: Broken up in 1686
- Notes: Participated in: First Battle of Schooneveld; Second Battle of Schooneveld; Battle of Texel

General characteristics
- Class & type: 80-82-gun ship of the line
- Length: 165 ft (50 m)
- Beam: 40 ft (12 m)
- Depth of hold: 15 ft (4.6 m)
- Propulsion: Sails
- Sail plan: Full-rigged ship
- Armament: 80-82-guns: Lower deck: 28 guns; Upper deck: 28 guns; Quarterdeck, Forecastle & Poop deck: 26 guns

The Gouden Leeuw (Dutch: Golden Lion) was a Dutch ship of the line armed with 80-82 cannon. The ship was built for the Admiralty of Amsterdam in 1666 during the Second Anglo-Dutch War. The Gouden Leeuw was for a time the largest Dutch warship. During the Third Anglo-Dutch War, the ship served as the flagship of Lieutenant Admiral Cornelis Tromp. She was Tromp's flagship at the Battle of Texel in 1673, with the Irishman Thomas Tobiasz as his flag captain. She was broken up in 1686.

The name Gouden Leeuw was available, as a previous Dutch ship with the same name had been wrecked on the coral reefs of Liuqiu Island, then known to the Dutch as Lamay, in 1622. The crewmembers were killed by the native inhabitants of the island, which ultimately led to a planned massacre and depopulation in 1636, sanctioned by the Dutch East Indies' colonial government.

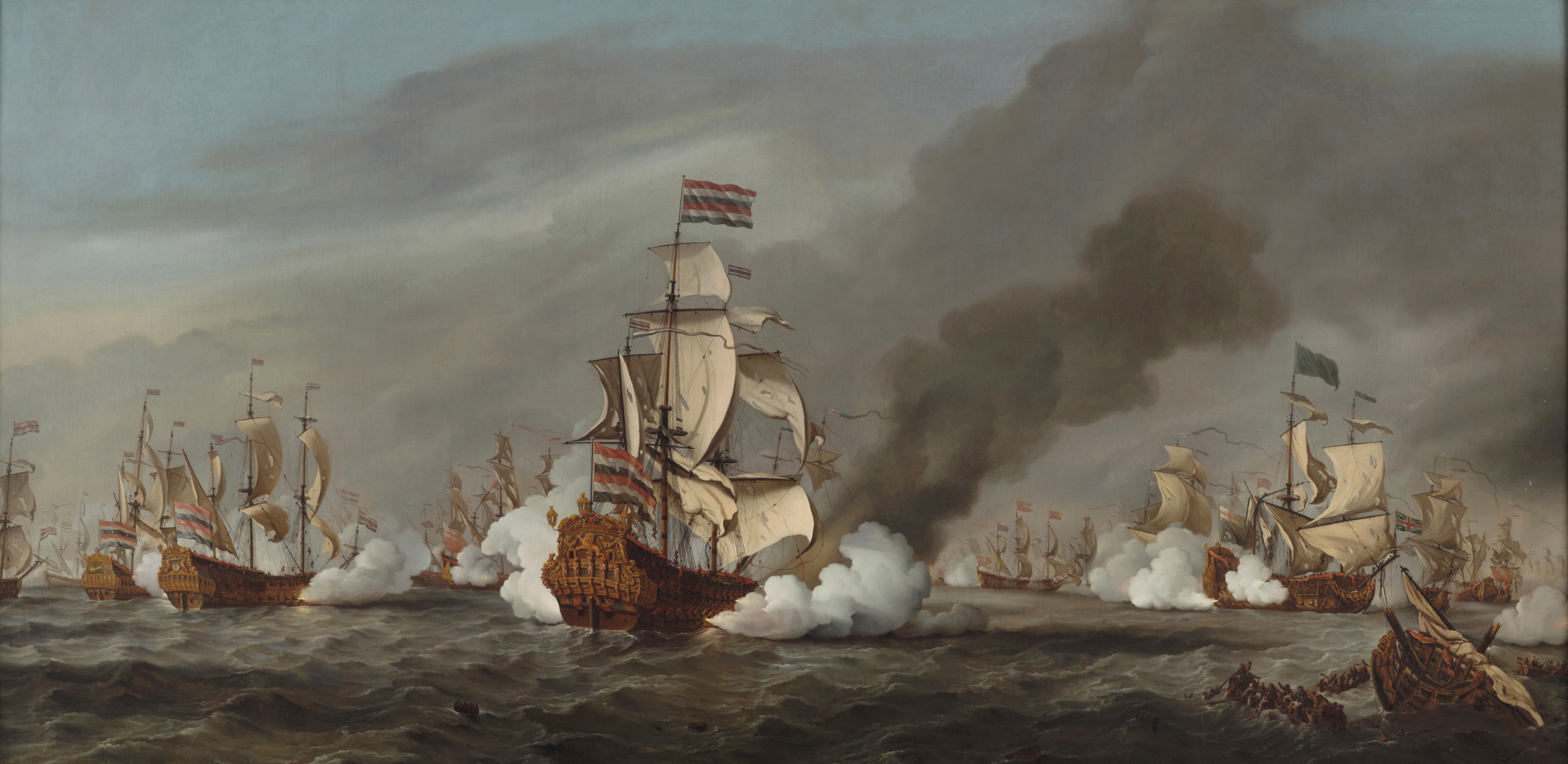
The Battle of Texel, 11/21 August 1673 by Willem van de Velde the Younger, painted 1683. The ship at the centre is Dutch Admiral Cornelis Tromp's flagship Gouden Leeuw, 82 guns.

The Gouden Leeuw was, in English feet, about 165 ft (50 m) long by about 40 ft (12 m) wide by approximately 15 ft (4.6 m) deep, and was armed with 28 guns on the lower deck, 28 guns on the upper deck, and 26 guns on the forecastle, quarterdeck, and poop deck. The ship was featured in several paintings by Willem van de Velde the Younger. The most prominent of these was De Gouden Leeuw voor Amsterdam, painted in 1686.
