= Dutch ship Eendracht (1666) =

History

Dutch Republic
- Name: Eendracht
- Builder: Salomon Janszoon van den Tempel, Dordrecht
- Laid down: 1665
- Fate: Wrecked in 1689

General characteristics
- Class & type: 76-gun ship of the line
- Length: 160 Amsterdam feet (45.3 m (149 ft))
- Beam: 42½ Amsterdam feet (12 m (39 ft))
- Depth of hold: 16½ Amsterdam feet (3.5 m (11 ft))
- Propulsion: Sails
- Sail plan: Full-rigged ship
- Complement: 400
- Armament: 76 guns (later 80 guns) comprising: 14 × 24-pdrs; 26 × 18-pdrs (by 1672, only 12 × 18-pdrs; 12 × 12-pdrs (by 1672, 24 × 12-pdrs); 16 × 6-pdrs (by 1672, only 6 × 6-pdrs); 8 × 4-pdrs (by 1672, 14 × 4-pdrs)

Eendracht or Eendragt ("Unity") was a First Charter (i.e. first rate) two-decker ship of the confederal navy of the United Provinces (a precursor state of the Netherlands) between 1666 and 1689. Eendragt was the more common spelling in the 17th century; Eendracht is the modern Dutch standard spelling.

Eeendracht was built from 1665 to 1666 for the Maas Admiralty, one of the five naval forces of the Dutch Republic, as a replacement for the earlier ship of the same name that had been sunk in June 1665 at the Battle of Lowestoft. The new ship was the flagship of Lieutenant-Admiraal Aert van Nes at the Four Days' Battle of 1666 and at the subsequent St James' Day Battle.
