= Aert Jansse van Nes =

Dutch naval commander

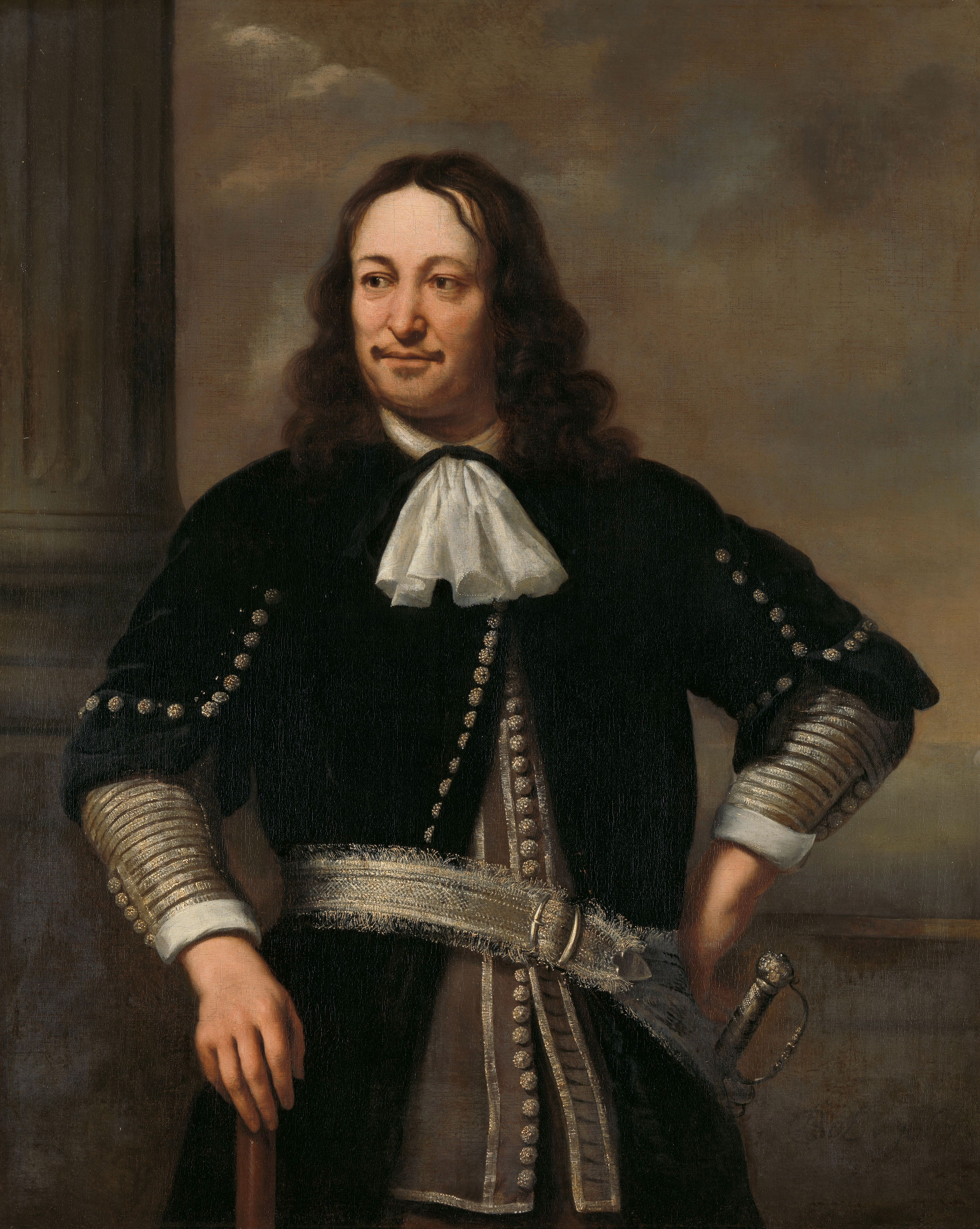
- Born: 1626; Rotterdam
- Died: 13 September 1693 (aged 66–67)
- Military career
- Allegiance: Dutch
- Branch: Navy
- Rank: Commander
- Conflicts: Raid on the Medway

Aert Jansse van Nes (1626 – 13 or 14 September 1693) was a 17th-century Dutch naval commander, notable for commanding the second squadron in the raid on the Medway in 1667.

Three modern ships of the Royal Netherlands Navy have been named after him: a destroyer in 1931, a frigate in 1966 and a multipurpose frigate (F833) in 1992.
