= Prince Rupert of the Rhine =

German-English army officer and admiral (1619–1682)

Prince Rupert
- Duke of Cumberland; Earl of Holderness
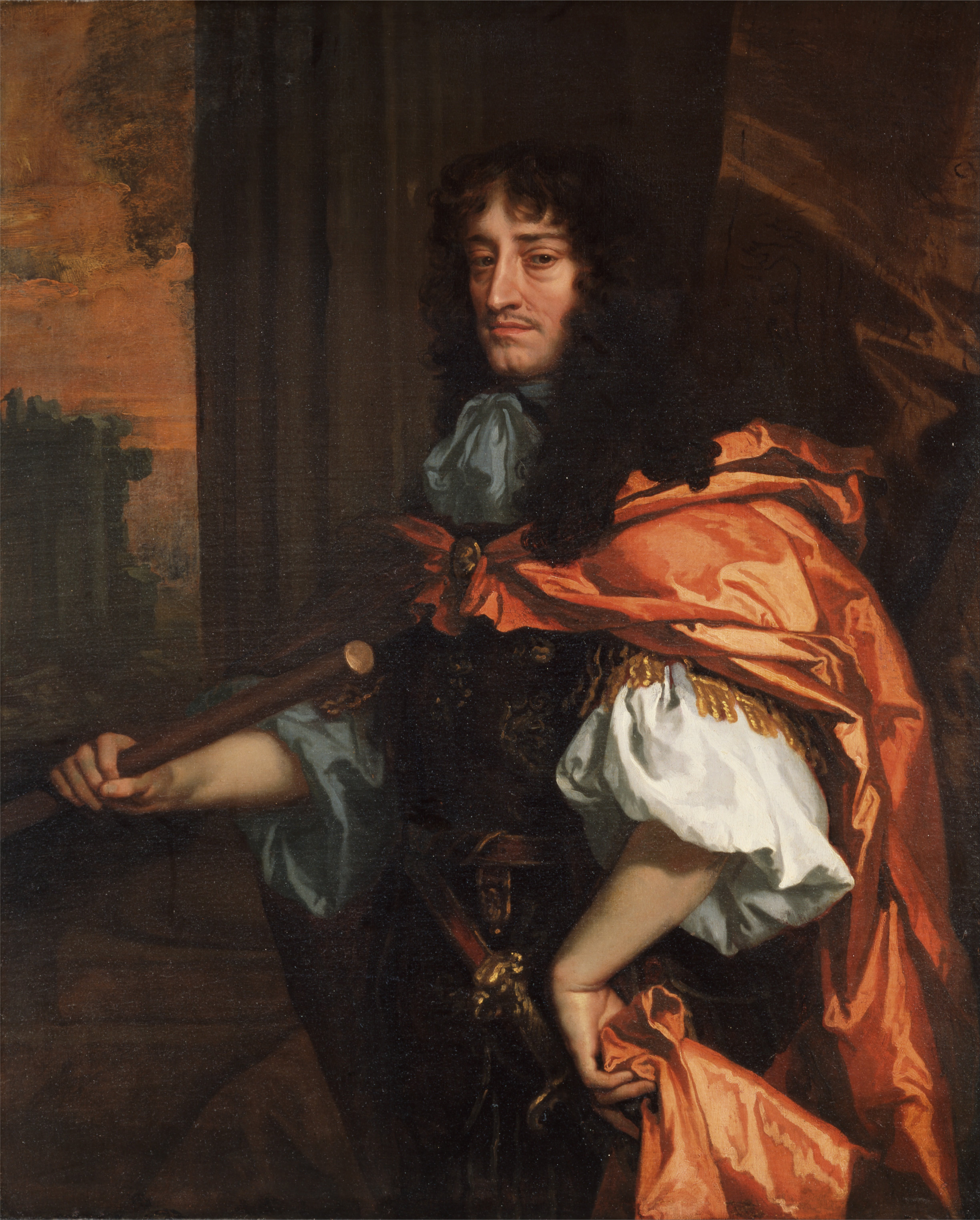
- Portrait, 1667–1671
- Born: 17 December 1619 (O.S.); Prague, Kingdom of Bohemia
- Died: 29 November 1682 (aged 62) (O.S.); London, England
- Burial: 6 December 1682 (O.S.); Westminster Abbey, London
- Issue: Dudley Bard; Ruperta Howe
- House: Palatinate-Simmern
- Dynasty: Wittelsbach
- Father: Frederick V, Elector Palatine
- Mother: Elizabeth Stuart
- Occupation: Soldier; statesman; privateer; scientist

Military service
- Conflicts: See list: Eighty Years' War; Siege of Rheinberg (1633); Siege of Leuven; Siege of Breda (1637); Thirty Years' War; Battle of Vlotho; First English Civil War; Battle of Powick Bridge; Battle of Edgehill; Battle of Brentford (1642); Battle of Birmingham (1643); Siege of Lichfield; Battle of Chalgrove Field; Siege of Bristol (1643); Siege of Gloucester; First Battle of Newbury; Relief of Newark; Storming of Bolton; Siege of Liverpool (1644); Siege of York; Battle of Marston Moor; Siege of Leicester (1645); Battle of Naseby; Siege of Bristol (1645); Franco-Spanish War (1635–1659); Siege of La Bassée (1647); Second Anglo-Dutch War; Battle of Lowestoft; Four Days' Battle; St James's Day Battle; Franco-Dutch War; First Battle of Schoonveld; Second Battle of Schoonveld; Battle of Texel

Prince Rupert of the Rhine, Duke of Cumberland (17 December [O.S. 7 December] 1619 – 29 November [O.S. 19 November] 1682) was an English–German army officer, admiral, scientist, and colonial governor. He first rose to prominence as a Royalist cavalry commander during the English Civil War. (Note: His full title was Rupert, Count Palatine of the Rhine, Duke of Bavaria, Duke of Cumberland, Earl of Holderness (German: Ruprecht Pfalzgraf bei Rhein, Herzog von Bayern).) Rupert was the third son of the German Prince Frederick V of the Palatinate and Elizabeth, eldest daughter of King James VI and I of Scotland and England respectively.

Prince Rupert's coat of arms as a Prince Palatine of the Rhine, showing the arms of the Palatinate quartered with his dynastical arms of Wittelsbach

Prince Rupert had a varied career. He was a teenage soldier fighting alongside Dutch forces against Habsburg Spain during the Eighty Years' War (1568–1648), and against the Holy Roman Emperor in Germany during the Thirty Years' War (1618–1648). Aged 23, he was appointed commander of the Royalist cavalry during the English Civil War, becoming the archetypal "Cavalier" of the war and ultimately the senior Royalist general. He surrendered after the fall of Bristol and was banished from England. He served under King Louis XIV of France against Spain, and then as a Royalist privateer in the Caribbean Sea. Following the Restoration, Rupert returned to England, becoming a senior English naval commander during the Second Anglo-Dutch War and Third Anglo-Dutch War, and serving as the first governor of the Hudson's Bay Company. He died in England in 1682, aged 62.

Rupert is considered to have been a quick-thinking and energetic cavalry general, but ultimately undermined by his youthful impatience in dealing with his peers during the Civil War. In the Interregnum, Rupert continued the conflict against Parliament by sea from the Mediterranean to the Caribbean, showing considerable persistence in the face of adversity. As the head of the Royal Navy in his later years, he showed greater maturity and made impressive and long-lasting contributions to the Royal Navy's doctrine and development. As colonial governor, Rupert shaped the political geography of modern Canada: the English possession of Rupert's Land was created for him to administer as its first governor and one of the founders of the Hudson's Bay Company. Rupert's varied and numerous scientific and administrative interests, combined with his considerable artistic skills, made him one of the more colourful public figures in England of the Restoration period.

== Parents and ancestry ==
Rupert's father was Frederick V of the Palatinate, of the Palatinate-Simmern branch of the House of Wittelsbach. As Elector Palatine, Frederick was one of the most important princes of the Holy Roman Empire. He was also head of the Protestant Union, a coalition of Protestant German states. The Palatinate was a wealthy state, and Frederick lived in great luxury.

Frederick's mother, Countess Louise Juliana of Nassau, was the daughter of William the Silent and half-sister of Maurice, Prince of Orange, who as stadtholders of Holland and other provinces were the leaders of the Dutch Republic.

Rupert's mother was Elizabeth Stuart, daughter of King James VI of Scotland and I of England. Thus Rupert was nephew of King Charles I of England and Scotland, and first cousin of King Charles II of England and Scotland, who made him Duke of Cumberland and Earl of Holderness. His sister Electress Sophia was the mother of George I of Great Britain.

Rupert was named in honour of Rupert, King of Germany, a famous Wittelsbach ancestor.

== Early life and exile ==
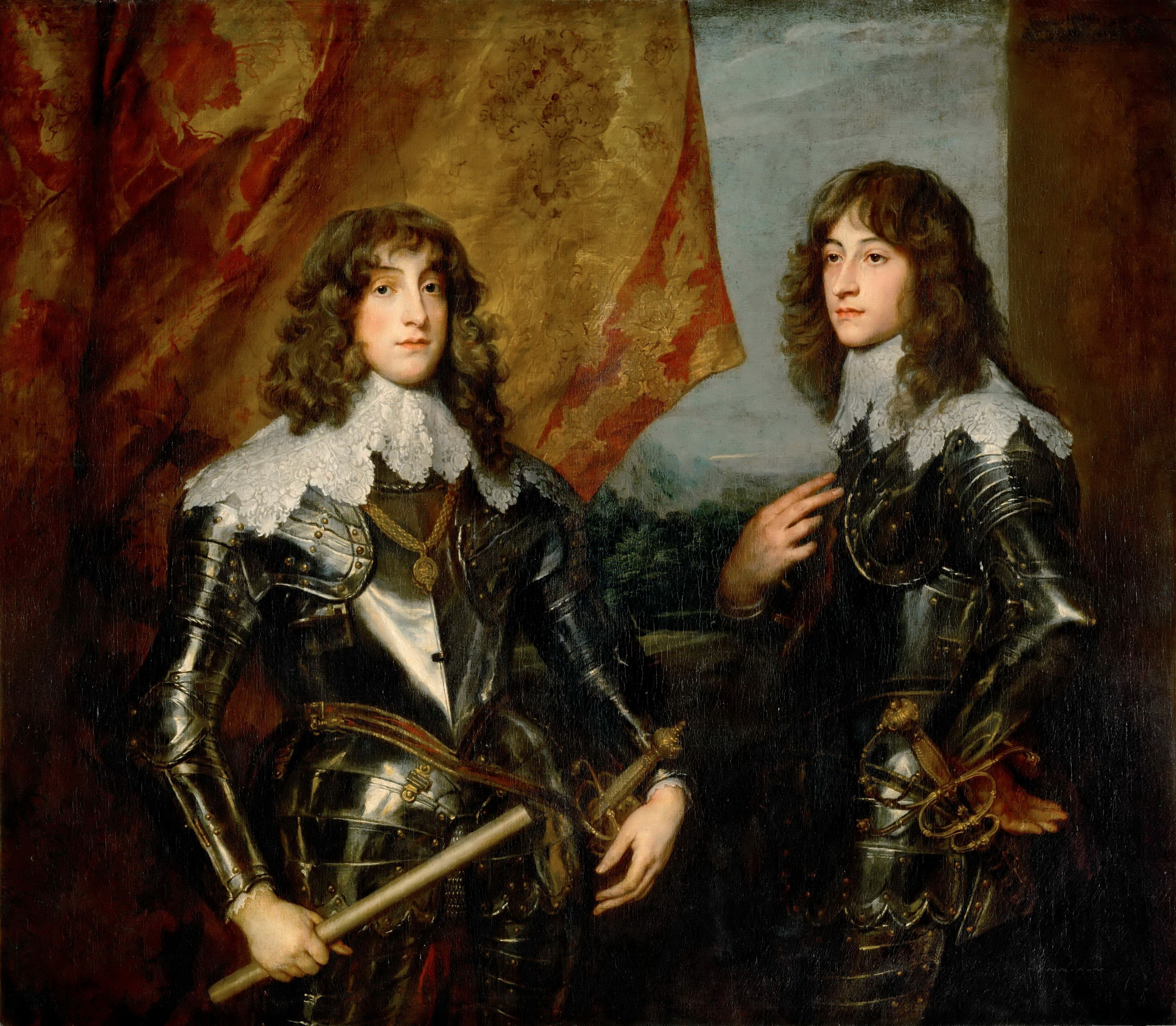
Rupert (right) with his elder brother, Charles I Louis, Elector Palatine (left), in a 1637 portrait by Anthony van Dyck

Rupert was born in Prague, Bohemia, in 1619, and was declared a prince by the principality of Lusatia. He was his parents' third son and fourth child overall. His father had just been elected king by the largely Protestant estates of Bohemia. This was perceived as an act of rebellion by the Catholic House of Habsburg, who had been kings of Bohemia since 1526, and initiated the Thirty Years' War. Frederick was not supported by the Protestant Union, and in 1620 was defeated by Emperor Ferdinand II in the Battle of White Mountain. Rupert's parents were thus mockingly termed the "Winter King and Queen". Rupert was almost left behind in the court's rush to escape Ferdinand's advance on Prague, until courtier Kryštof z Donína (Christopher Dhona) tossed the prince into a carriage at the last moment.

Rupert accompanied his parents to The Hague, where he spent his early years at the Hof te Wassenaer (the Wassenaer Court). Rupert's mother paid her children little attention even by the standards of the day, apparently preferring her pet monkeys and dogs. Instead, Frederick employed a French couple, Monsieur and Madame de Plessen, as governors to his children. They were raised with a positive attitude towards the Bohemians and the English, and as strict Calvinists. The result was a strict school routine including logic, mathematics, writing, drawing, singing, and playing instruments.

As a child, Rupert was at times badly behaved, "fiery, mischievous, and passionate" and earned himself the nickname Robert le Diable, or "Rupert The Devil". Nonetheless, Rupert proved to be an able student. By the age of three, he could speak some English, Czech, and French, and mastered German while still young; however, he had little interest in Latin and Greek. He excelled in art, being taught by Gerard van Honthorst, and found mathematics and science easy. By the time he was 18 he stood about 6 ft 4 in (193 cm) tall.

Rupert's family continued their attempts to regain the Palatinate during their time in The Hague. Money was short, with the family relying upon a relatively small pension from The Hague, the proceeds from family investments in Dutch raids on Spanish shipping, and revenue from pawned family jewellery. Frederick set about convincing an alliance of nations—including England, France and Sweden — to support his attempts to regain the Palatinate and Bohemia. By the early 1630s, Frederick had built a close relationship with King Gustavus Adolphus of Sweden, the dominant Protestant leader in Germany during its intervention in the Thirty Years War. In 1632, however, the two men disagreed over Gustavus Adolphus' insistence that Frederick provide equal rights to his Lutheran and Calvinist subjects after regaining his lands; Frederick refused and set off to return to The Hague. He died of a fever along the way and was buried in an unmarked grave.

Rupert had lost his father at the age of 13, and Gustavus Adolphus' death at the Battle of Lützen in the same month deprived the family of a critical Protestant ally. With Frederick gone, King Charles proposed that the family move to England; Rupert's mother declined, but asked that Charles extend his protection to her remaining children instead.

== Teenage years ==
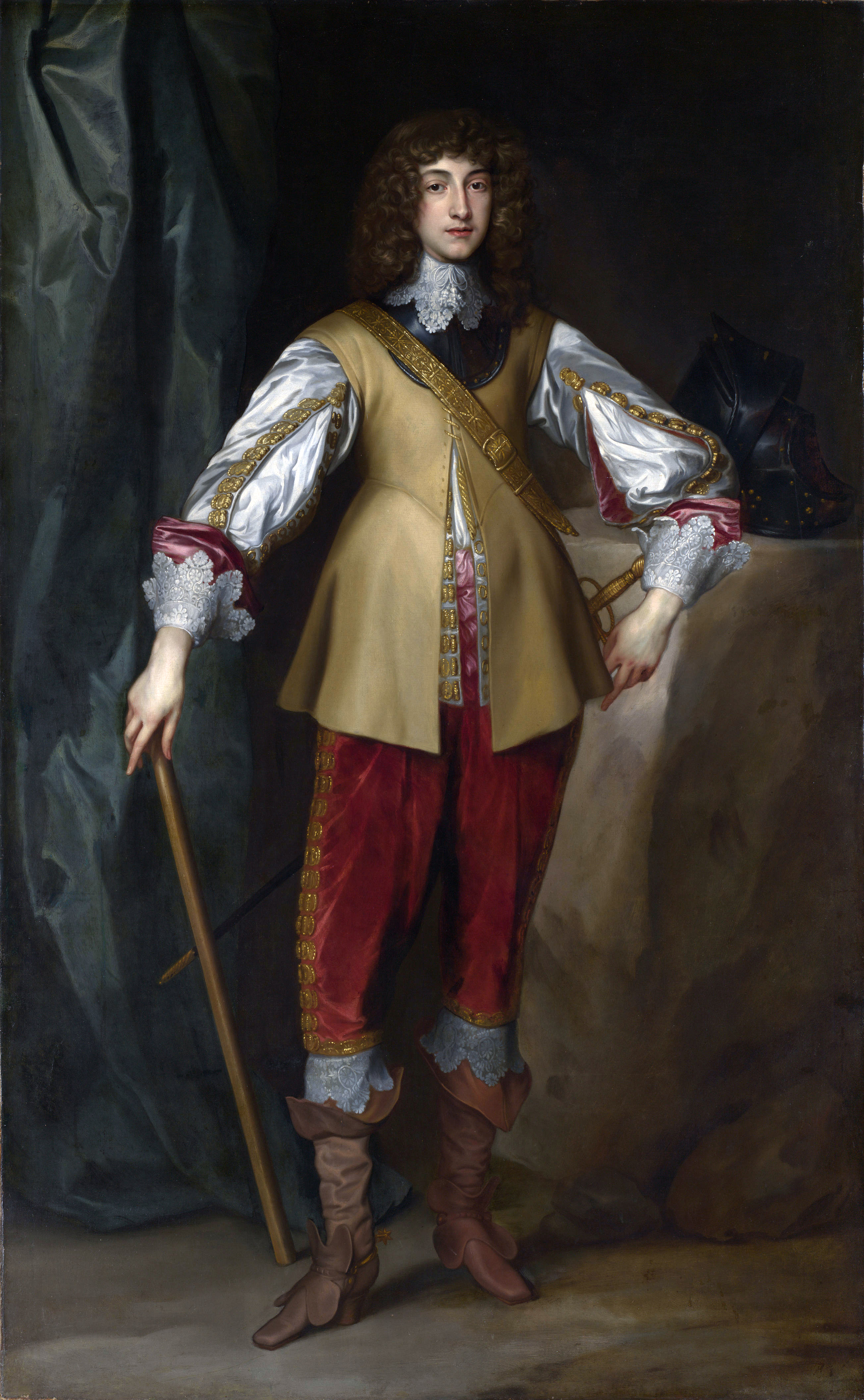
Rupert as a young man visiting the court of his uncle, King Charles I of England, by Anthony van Dyck

Rupert spent the beginning of his teenage years between the courts of The Hague and that of his uncle, King Charles I, before being captured and imprisoned in Linz during the middle stages of the Thirty Years' War. Rupert had become a soldier early; at the age of 14 he attended the Dutch pas d'armes with the Protestant Frederick Henry, Prince of Orange. Later that year he fought alongside him and the Duke of Brunswick at the Anglo-German siege of Rheinberg, and by 1635 he was acting as a military lifeguard to Prince Frederick. Rupert went on to fight against imperial Spain in the successful campaign around Breda in 1637 during the Eighty Years' War in the Netherlands. By the end of this period, Rupert had acquired a reputation for fearlessness in battle, high spirits and considerable industry.

In between these campaigns, Rupert had visited his uncle's court in England. The Palatinate cause was a popular Protestant issue in England, and in 1637 a general public subscription helped fund an expedition under Charles Louis to try to regain the electorate as part of a joint French campaign. Rupert was placed in command of a Palatinate cavalry regiment, and his later friend Lord Craven, an admirer of Rupert's mother, assisted in raising funds and accompanied the army on the campaign. The campaign ended badly at the Battle of Vlotho (17 October 1638) during the invasion of Westphalia; Rupert escaped death, but was captured by the forces of the Imperial General Melchior von Hatzfeldt towards the end of the battle.

After a failed attempt to bribe his way free of his guards, Rupert was imprisoned in Linz. Lord Craven, also taken in the battle, attempted to persuade his captors to allow him to remain with Rupert, but was refused. Rupert's imprisonment was surrounded by religious overtones. His mother was deeply concerned that he might be converted from Calvinism to Catholicism; his captors, encouraged by Emperor Ferdinand III, deployed Jesuit priests in an attempt to convert him. The emperor went further, proffering the option of freedom, a position as an Imperial general and a small principality if Rupert would convert. Rupert refused.

Rupert's imprisonment became more relaxed on the advice of the Archduke Leopold, Ferdinand's younger brother, who met and grew to like Rupert. Rupert practised etching, played tennis, practised shooting, read military textbooks and was taken on accompanied hunting trips. He also entered into a romantic affair with Susan Kuffstein, the daughter of Count von Kuffstein, his gaoler. He received a present of a rare white poodle that Rupert called Boy or sometimes Pudel, and which remained with him into the English Civil War. Despite attempts by a Swedish army to seize Linz and free Rupert, his release was ultimately negotiated through Leopold and the Empress Maria Anna; in exchange for a commitment never again to take up arms against the emperor, Rupert would be released. Rupert formally kissed the emperor's hand at the end of 1641, turned down a final offer of an imperial command and left Germany for England.

== Career during the First English Civil War ==
Rupert was a Royalist commander during the English Civil War. He had considerable success during the initial years of the war, his drive, determination and experience of European techniques bringing him early victories. As the war progressed, Rupert's youth and lack of maturity in managing his relationships with other Royalist commanders ultimately resulted in his removal from his post and ultimate retirement from the war. Throughout the conflict, however, Rupert also enjoyed a powerful symbolic position: he was an iconic Royalist Cavalier and as such was frequently the subject of both Parliamentarian and Royalist propaganda, an image which has endured over the years.

=== Early phases, 1642–1643 ===
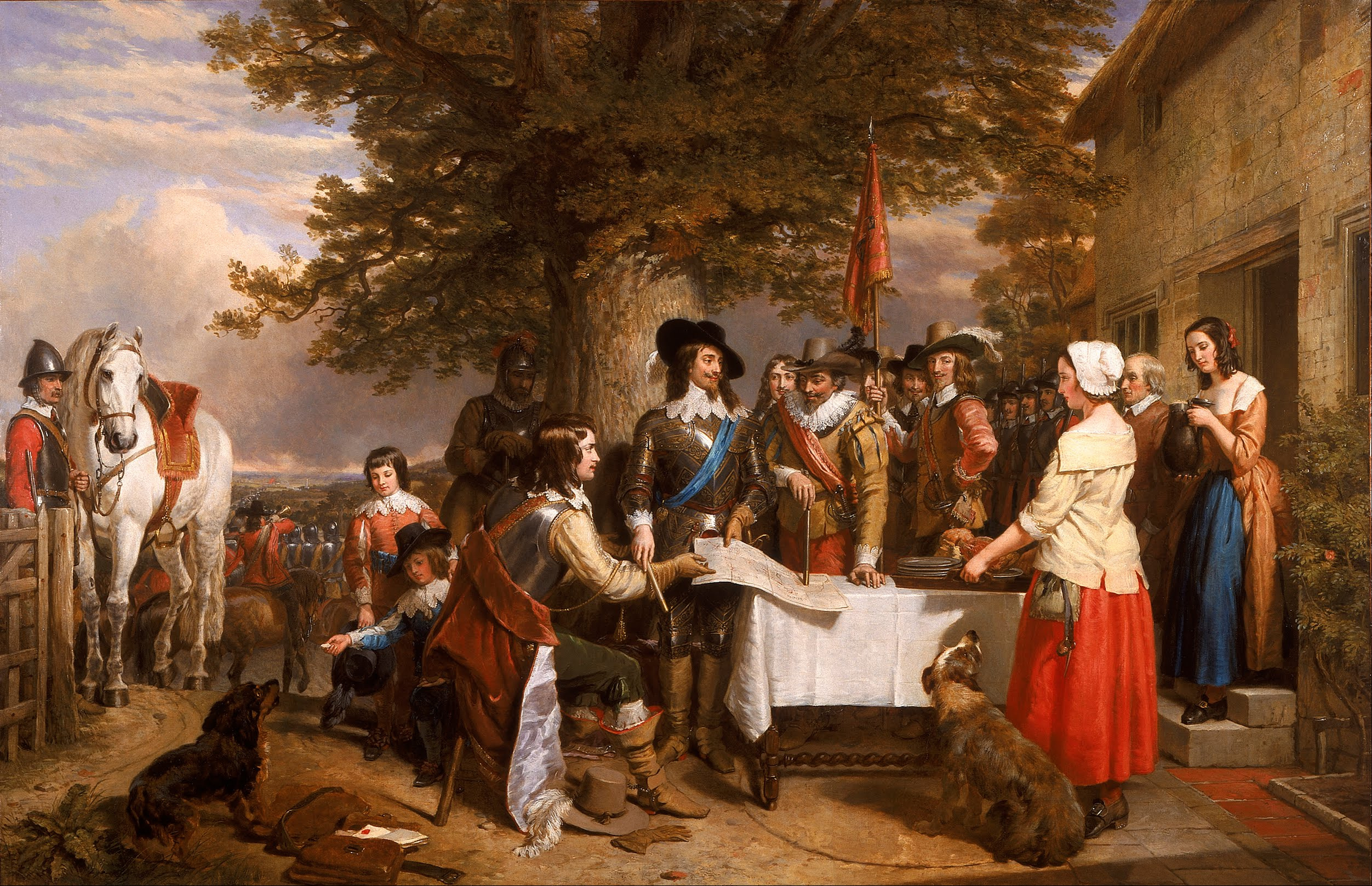
The Eve of the Battle of Edgehill by Charles Landseer, 1845. Charles I (in blue sash) holding a council of war at Edgecote on the day before the Battle of Edgehill. Rupert, seated, commanded the King's cavalry.

In August 1642, Rupert, along with his brother Prince Maurice and a number of professional soldiers, ran the gauntlet across the sea from the United Provinces, and after one initial failure, evaded the pro-Parliamentary navy and landed in Newcastle. Riding across country, he found the King with a tiny army at Leicester Abbey, and was promptly appointed General of Horse, a coveted appointment at the time in European warfare. Rupert set about recruiting and training: with great effort he had put together a partially trained mounted force of 3,000 cavalry by the end of September. Rupert's reputation continued to rise and, leading a sudden, courageous charge, he routed a Parliamentarian force at Powick Bridge, the first military engagement of the war. Although a small engagement, this had a propaganda value far exceeding the importance of the battle itself, and Rupert became an heroic figure for many young men in the Royalist camp.

Rupert joined the King in the advance on London, playing a key role in the resulting Battle of Edgehill in October. Once again, Rupert was at his best with swift battlefield movements; the night before, he had undertaken a forced march and seized the summit of Edgehill, giving the Royalists a superior position. When he quarrelled with his fellow infantry commander, Robert Bertie, however, some of the weaknesses of Rupert's character began to display themselves. Rupert vigorously interjected—probably correctly, but certainly tactlessly—that Lindsey should deploy his men in the modern Swedish fashion that Rupert was used to in Europe, which would have maximised their available firepower. The result was an argument in front of the troops and Lindsey's resignation and replacement by Sir Jacob Astley. In the subsequent battle Rupert's men made a dramatic cavalry charge, but despite his best efforts a subsequent scattering and loss of discipline turned a potential victory into a stalemate.

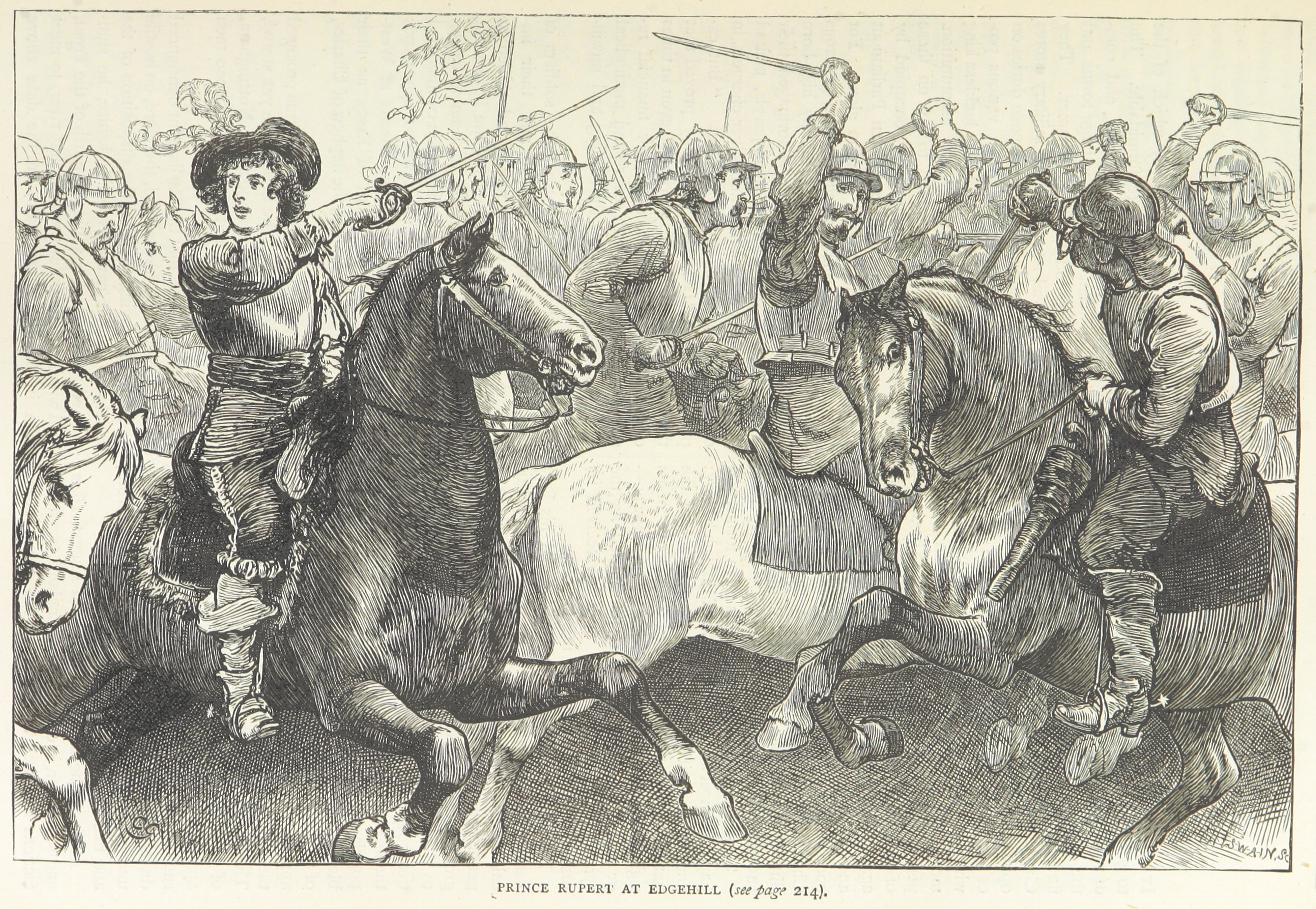
Illustration of Prince Rupert at Edgehill

After Edgehill, Rupert asked Charles for a swift cavalry attack on London before the Earl of Essex's army could return. The King's senior counsellors, however, urged him to advance slowly on the capital with the whole army. By the time they arrived, the city had organised defences against them. Some argue that, in delaying, the Royalists had perhaps lost their best chance of winning the war, although others have argued that Rupert's proposed attack would have had trouble penetrating a hostile London. Instead, early in 1643, Rupert began to clear the South-West, taking Cirencester in February before moving further against Bristol, a key port. Rupert took Bristol in July with his brother Maurice using Cornish forces and was appointed governor of the city. By mid-1643, Rupert had become so well known that he was an issue in any potential peace accommodation—Parliament was seeking to see him punished as part of any negotiated solution, and the presence of Rupert at the court, close to the King during the negotiations, was perceived as a bellicose statement in itself.

=== Later stages, 1644–1646 ===
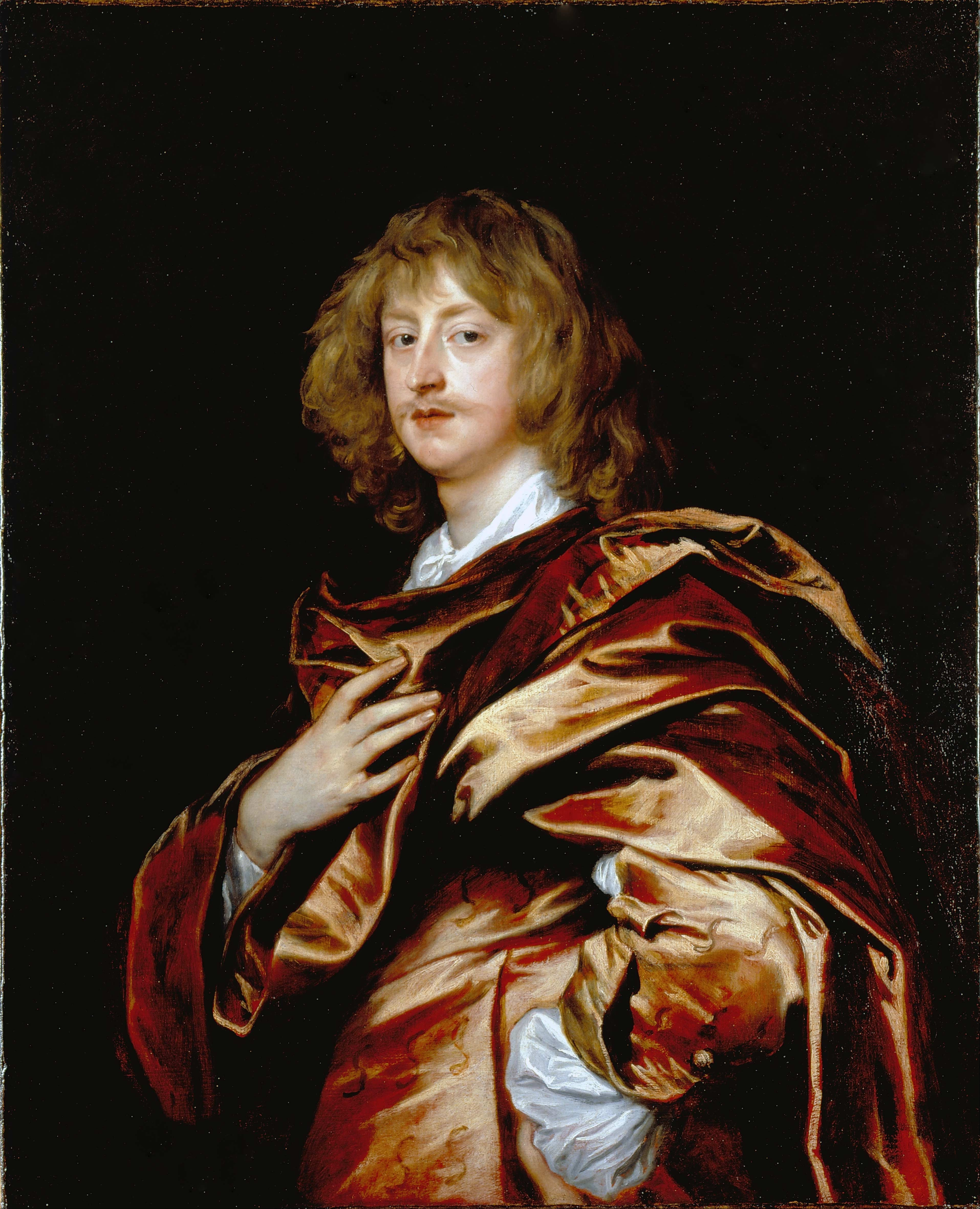
George Digby, by Sir Anthony Van Dyck; although a less successful soldier, Digby was an increasingly powerful political rival to Rupert within the Royalist court during the second half of the English Civil War

During the second half of the war, political opposition within the Royalist senior leadership against Prince Rupert continued to grow. His personality during the war had made him both friends and enemies. He enjoyed a "frank and generous disposition", showed a "quickness of... intellect", was prepared to face grave dangers, and could be thorough and patient when necessary. However, Prince Rupert lacked the social gifts of a courtier, and his humour could turn into a "sardonic wit and a contemptuous manner": with a hasty temper, he was too quick to say whom he respected and whom he disliked. The result was that, while he could inspire great loyalty in some, especially with his men, he also made many enemies at the Royal court. When Prince Rupert took Bristol, he also slighted the Marquess of Hertford, the lethargic but politically significant Royalist leader of the South-West. Most critically, he fell out with George Digby, a favourite of both the King and the Queen. Digby was a classic courtier and Rupert fell to arguing with him repeatedly in meetings. The result was that towards the end of the war Prince Rupert's position at court was increasingly undermined by his enemies.

Rupert continued to impress militarily. By 1644, now the Duke of Cumberland and Earl of Holderness, he led the relief of Newark, as well as York and its castle. Having marched north, taking Bolton and Liverpool along the way in two bloody assaults, Rupert then intervened in Yorkshire in two highly effective manoeuvres, in the first outwitting the enemy forces at Newark with speed; in the second, striking across country and approaching York from the north. Rupert then commanded much of the royalist army at its defeat at Marston Moor, with much of the blame falling on the poor working relationship between Rupert and the Marquess of Newcastle, and orders from the King that wrongly conveyed a desperate need for a speedy success in the north.

In November 1644, Rupert was appointed general of the entire Royalist army, which increased already marked tensions between him and a number of the King's councillors. By May 1645, and now desperately short of supplies, Rupert captured Leicester, but suffered a severe reversal at the Battle of Naseby a month later. Although Rupert had counselled the King against accepting battle at Naseby, the opinions of Digby had won the day in council: nonetheless, Rupert's defeat damaged him, rather than Digby, politically. After Naseby, Rupert regarded the Royalist cause as lost, and urged Charles to conclude a peace with Parliament. Charles, still supported by an optimistic Digby, believed he could win the war. By late summer, Prince Rupert had become trapped in Bristol by Parliamentary forces. Faced with an impossible military situation on the ground, Rupert surrendered Bristol in September 1645, and Charles dismissed him from his service and command.

Rupert responded by making his way across Parliamentary held territory to the King at Newark with Prince Maurice and around a hundred men, fighting their way through smaller enemy units and evading larger ones. King Charles attempted to order Rupert to desist, fearing an armed coup, but Rupert arrived at the royal court anyway. After a difficult meeting, Rupert convinced the King to hold a court-martial over his conduct at Bristol, which exonerated him and Maurice. After a final argument over the fate of his friend Richard Willis, the governor of Newark, who had let Rupert into the royal court to begin with, Rupert resigned and left the service of King Charles, along with most of his best cavalry officers. Earlier interpretations of this event focused on Rupert's concern for his honour in the face of his initial dismissal by the King; later works have highlighted the practical importance of the courts martial to Rupert's future employability as a mercenary in Europe, given that Rupert knew that the war by this point was effectively lost. Rupert and Maurice spent the winter of 1645 in Woodstock, examining options for employment under the Republic of Venice, before returning to Oxford and the King in 1646. Rupert and the King were reconciled, the Prince remaining to defend Oxford when the King left for the north. After the ensuing siege and surrender of Oxford in 1646, Parliament banished both Rupert and his brother from England.

=== Reputation ===
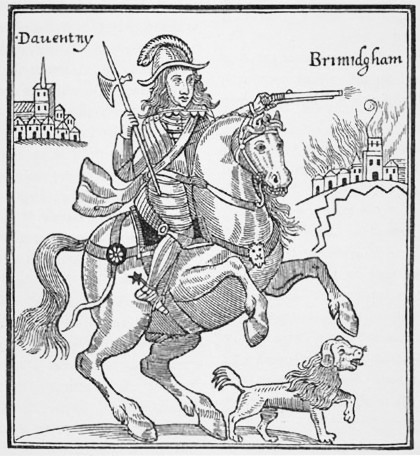
Rupert was a common figure of Parliamentarian propaganda, depicted here, with his dog Boy, pillaging the town of Birmingham

Rupert's contemporaries believed him to have been involved in some of the bloodier events of the war. Rupert had grown up amidst and participated in the savage warfare of the Thirty Years' War in Central Europe. Shortly after his arrival in England, he caused consternation for employing similar practices. One of his early acts was to demand two thousand pounds from the people of Leicester to the King as the price of not sacking the city. Although in keeping with European practices, this was not considered appropriate behaviour in England and Rupert was reprimanded by the King.

Rupert's reputation never truly recovered, and in subsequent sieges and attacks he was frequently accused of acting without restraint. Birmingham, a key arms producing town, was taken in April 1643, and Rupert faced allegations—probably untrue—of wilfully burning the town to the ground (see the Battle of Camp Hill). Shortly afterwards Rupert attempted to take the town of Lichfield, whose garrison had executed Royalist prisoners, angrily promising to kill all the soldiers inside. Only the urgent call for assistance from the King prevented him from doing so, forcing him to agree to more lenient terms in exchange for a prompt surrender. Towards the end of the war, practices were changing for the worse across all sides; a rebellious Leicester was retaken by the Prince in May 1645, and no attempt was made to limit the subsequent killing and plunder.

Rupert was accordingly a prominent figure in Parliamentary propaganda. He faced numerous accusations of witchcraft, either personally or by proxy through his pet dog, Boy, sometimes called Pudel, a large white hunting poodle which accompanied Rupert everywhere from 1642 up until the dog's death at Marston Moor and which was suspected of being a witch's familiar. There were numerous accounts of Boy's abilities; some suggested that he was the Devil in disguise, come to help Rupert. Pro-Royalist publications ultimately produced parodies of these, including one which listed Rupert's dog as being a "Lapland Lady" transformed into a white dog; Boy was alleged to be invulnerabile and able to find hidden treasure, catch bullets fired at Rupert in his mouth, and prophesy as well as the 16th-century soothsayer, Mother Shipton. Similar stories from the period relate to Rupert's pet monkey. Like his dog, the monkey was featured in newsprint of the day and was also reputed to have shapeshifting powers, being able to disguise itself behind enemy lines.

== Second English Civil War and Interregnum ==
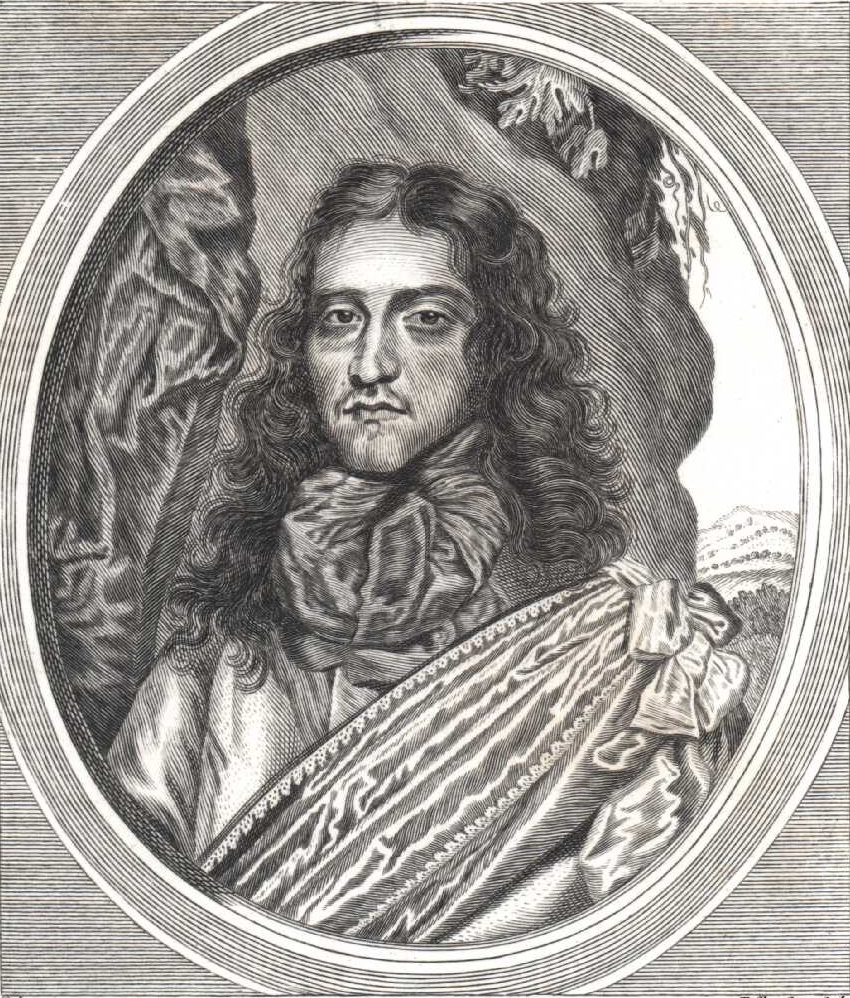
Rupert at the start of the Interregnum, after William Dobson.

After the end of the First English Civil War Rupert was employed by the young French King Louis XIV to fight the Spanish during the final years of the Thirty Years' War. Rupert's military employment was complicated by his promises to the Holy Roman Emperor that had led to his release from captivity in 1642, and his ongoing commitment to the English Royalist faction in exile. He also became a Knight of the Garter in 1642. Throughout the period Rupert was inconvenienced by his lack of secure income, and his ongoing feuds with other leading members of the Royalist circle.

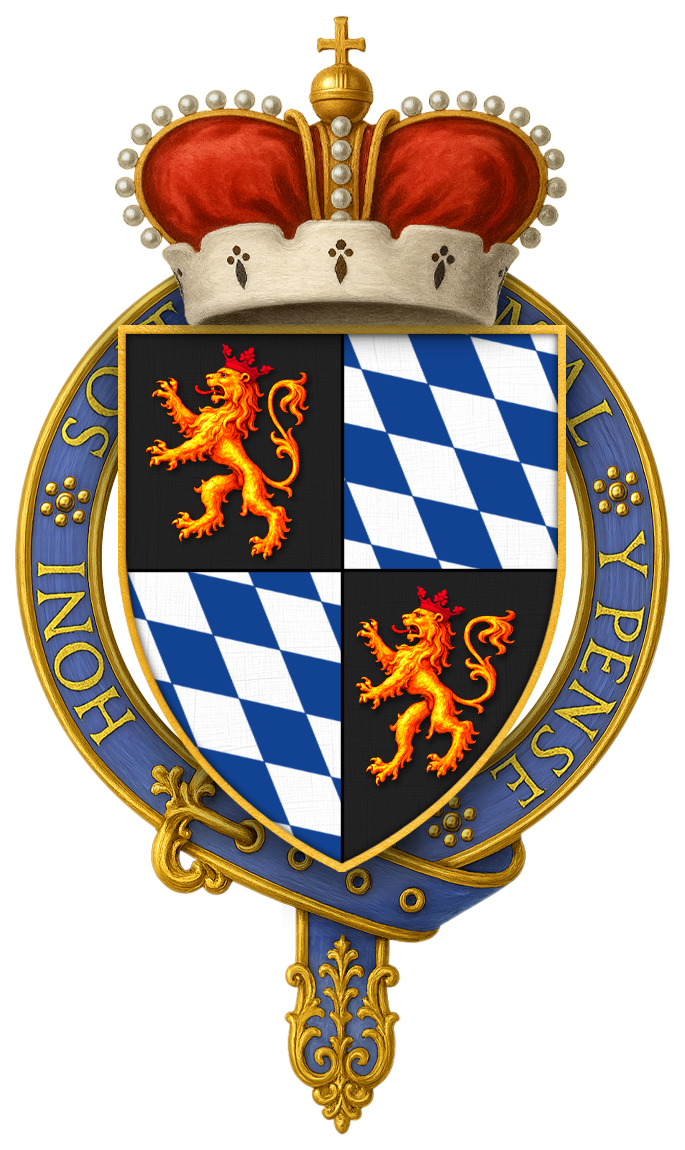
Coat of arms of Prince Rupert as a Knight of the Garter, which he was invested with in 1642.

=== Service in the French army ===
Rupert first travelled to the Royal court in exile at St Germain but found it still dominated by the Queen and her favourite, Rupert's enemy Digby. Instead, Rupert moved on, accepting a well paid commission from Anne of Austria to serve Louis XIV as a mareschal de camp, subject to Rupert being free to leave French service to fight for King Charles, should he be called upon to do so. In 1647, Rupert fought under Marshal Jean de Gassion against the Spanish. After a three-week siege, Rupert took the powerful fortress of La Bassée through quiet negotiations with the enemy commander—an impressive accomplishment, and one that won him favour in French court circles. Gassion and Rupert were ambushed shortly afterwards by a Spanish party; during the resulting fight, Rupert was shot in the head and seriously injured. Afterwards, Gassion noted: "Monsieur, I am most annoyed that you are wounded." "And me also," Rupert is recorded as replying. Gassion was himself killed shortly afterwards, and Rupert returned to St Germain to recuperate.

=== Service in the Royalist navy ===
In 1648, the relatively brief Second English Civil War broke out, and Rupert informed the French King that he would be returning to King Charles's service. The Parliamentary navy mutinied in favour of the King and sailed for Holland, providing the Royalists with a major fleet for the first time since the start of the civil conflict; Rupert joined the fleet under the command of the Duke of York, who assumed the rank of Lord High Admiral.

Rupert argued that the fleet should be used to rescue the King, then being held prisoner on the Isle of Wight, while others advised sailing in support of the fighting in the north. The fleet itself rapidly lost discipline, with many vessels' crews focussing on seizing local ships and cargoes. This underlined a major problem for the Royalists—the cost of maintaining the new fleet was well beyond their means. Discipline continued to deteriorate and Rupert had to intervene personally several times, including defusing one group of mutinous sailors by suddenly dangling the ringleader over the side of his vessel and threatening to drop him into the sea. Most of the fleet finally switched sides once more, returning to England in late 1648.

Then, following a degree of reconciliation with Charles, Rupert obtained command of the Royalist fleet himself. The intention was to restore Royalist finances by using the remaining vessels of the fleet to conduct a campaign of organised piracy against English shipping across the region. One of the obstacles that this plan faced was the growing strength of the Parliamentary fleet and the presence of Robert Blake, one of the finest admirals of the period, as Rupert's opponent during the campaign.

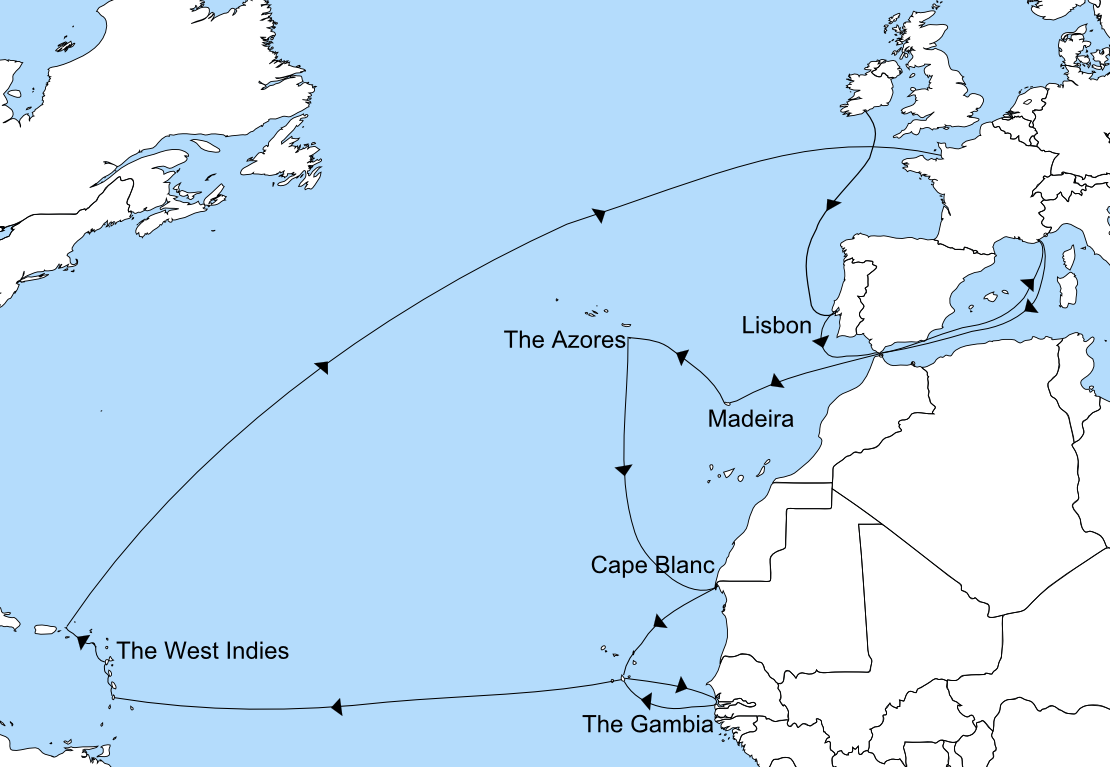
Rupert's maritime campaign in the Atlantic Ocean and Mediterranean and Caribbean Seas, 1650–1653

Rupert's naval campaign formed two phases. The first involved the Royalist fleet sailing from Kinsale in Ireland to Lisbon in Portugal. He took three large ships, English ship Constant Reformation, the Convertine and the Swallow, accompanied by four smaller vessels. Rupert sailed to Lisbon taking several prizes en route, where he received a warm welcome from King John IV, the ruler of recently independent Portugal, who was a supporter of Charles II. Blake arrived shortly afterwards with a Parliamentary fleet, and an armed stand-off ensued. Tensions rose, skirmishes began to break out and King John became increasingly keen for his Royalist guests to leave. In October 1650, Rupert's fleet, now comprising six vessels, broke out and headed into the Mediterranean. Still pursued by Blake, the Royalist fleet manoeuvred up the Spanish coast, steadily losing vessels to their pursuers.

The second phase of the campaign then began. Rupert crossed back into the Atlantic and, during 1651, cut west to the Azores, capturing vessels as he went. He intended to continue on to the West Indies, where there would be many rich targets. Instead he encountered a late summer storm, leading to the sinking of the Constant Reformation with the loss of 333 lives—almost including Rupert's brother, Prince Maurice, who only just escaped — and a great deal of captured treasure. Turning back to regroup, repair and re-equip in early 1652, Rupert's reduced force moored at Cape Blanc, an island near what is now Mauritania. Rupert took the opportunity to explore and acquired a Moorish servant boy, who remained in his service for many years. Rupert also explored 150 miles up the Gambia River, taking two Spanish vessels as prizes and contracting malaria in the process.

Rupert then finally made a successful crossing into the Caribbean, landing first at Saint Lucia, before continuing up the chain of the Antilles to the Virgin Islands. There the fleet was hit by a hurricane, which scattered the ships and sank the Defiance, this time with Prince Maurice on board. It was a while before Maurice's death became certain, which came as a terrible blow to Rupert. He was forced to return to Europe, arriving in France in March 1653 with a fleet of five ships. It became clear, as the profits and losses of the piracy campaign were calculated, that the venture had not been as profitable as hoped. This complicated tensions in the Royalist court, and Charles II and Rupert eventually split the spoils, after which Rupert, tired and a little bitter, returned to France to recuperate from the long campaign.

In 1654, Rupert appears to have been involved in a plot to assassinate Oliver Cromwell, an event that would then have been followed by a coup, the landing of a small army in Sussex, and the restoration of Charles II. Charles himself is understood to have rejected the assassination proposal, but three conspirators—who implicated Rupert in the plan—were arrested and confessed in London.

Rupert's presence at the royal court continued to be problematic; as in 1643, he was regarded by Edward Hyde (later Earl of Clarendon) and others as a bellicose figure and an obstacle to peace negotiations; in 1655 Rupert left for Germany.

=== Service in Germany ===
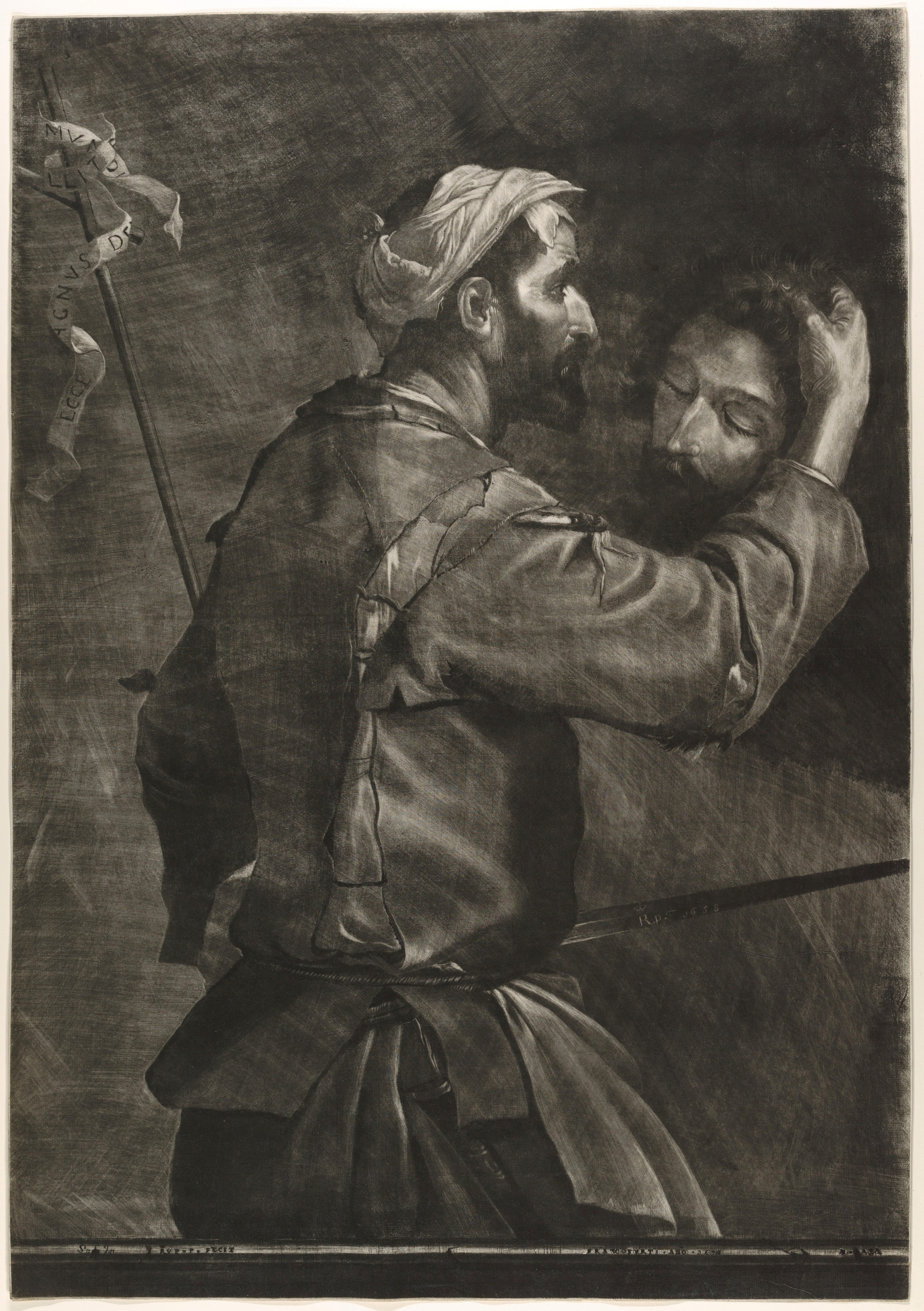
Rupert's largest and most famous mezzotint work, The Great Executioner, considered by critic Antony Griffiths to be "one of the greatest mezzotints"

After his quarrel with the Royalist court in exile, Rupert travelled to Heidelberg to visit his brother Charles I Louis, now partially restored as Elector Palatine, where the two had an ambivalent reunion. Charles Louis and Rupert had not been friendly as children and had almost ended up on opposite sides during the Civil War. To make matters worse, Charles Louis had been deprived of half the old Palatinate under the Peace of Westphalia, leaving him badly short of money, although he still remained responsible under the Imperial laws of apanage for providing for his younger brother and had offered the sum of £375 per annum, which Rupert had accepted. Rupert travelled on to Vienna, where he attempted to claim the £15,000 compensation allocated to him under the Peace of Westphalia from the Emperor. Ferdinand III warmly welcomed him, but was unable to pay such a sum immediately—instead, he would have to pay in installments, to the disadvantage of Rupert.

Over the next twelve months, Rupert was asked by the Duke of Modena in Northern Italy to raise an army against the Papal States—having done so, and with the army stationed in the Palatinate, the enterprise collapsed, with the Duke requesting that Rupert invade Spanish held Milan instead. Rupert moved on, having placed his brother Charles Louis in some diplomatic difficulties with Spain. Rupert travelled onwards, continuing to attempt to convince Ferdinand to back Charles II's efforts to regain his throne.

In 1656, relations between Rupert and Charles Louis deteriorated badly. Rupert had fallen in love with Louise von Degenfeld, one of his sister-in-law's maids of honour. One of Rupert's notes proffering his affections accidentally fell into the possession of Charles Louis' wife Charlotte, who believed it was written to her. Charlotte was keen to engage in an affair with Rupert and became unhappy when she was declined and the mistake explained. Degenfeld was uninterested in Rupert, but was engaged in an affair with Charles Louis; this was discovered in due course, leading to the annulment of the marriage. Rupert, for his part, was unhappy that Charles Louis could not endow him with a suitable estate, and the two parted on bad terms in 1657, Rupert refusing ever to return to the Palatinate again and taking up employment under Ferdinand III in his Kingdom of Hungary.

=== Interest in art ===
During this period Rupert became closely involved in the development of mezzotint, a "negative" or intaglio printmaking process which eventually superseded the older woodcut process. Rupert appears to have told a range of associates that he had conceived of the mezzotint process through having watched a soldier scrape the rust from the barrel of his musket during a military campaign. John Evelyn credited Rupert as the inventor of the technique in 1662, and Rupert's story was further popularised by Horace Walpole during the 18th century. Considerable academic debate surrounds the issue, but the modern consensus is that mezzotint was instead invented in 1642 by Ludwig von Siegen, a German lieutenant-colonel who was also an amateur artist. Siegen may or may not have met Rupert: Siegen had worked as chamberlain, and probably part-tutor, to Rupert's young cousin William VI, Landgrave of Hesse-Kassel, with whom Rupert discussed the technique in letters from 1654. Rupert did, however, become a noted artist in mezzotint in his own right. He produced a few stylish prints in the technique, mostly interpretations of existing paintings, and introduced the form to England after the Restoration, though it was Wallerant Vaillant, Rupert's artistic assistant or tutor, who first popularised the process and exploited it commercially. Rupert's most famous and largest art work, The Great Executioner, produced in 1658, is still regarded by critics such as Arthur Hind and Antony Griffiths as full of "brilliance and energy", "superb" and "one of the greatest mezzotints" ever produced; other important works by Rupert include the Head of Titian and The Standard Bearer.

== Career following the Restoration ==
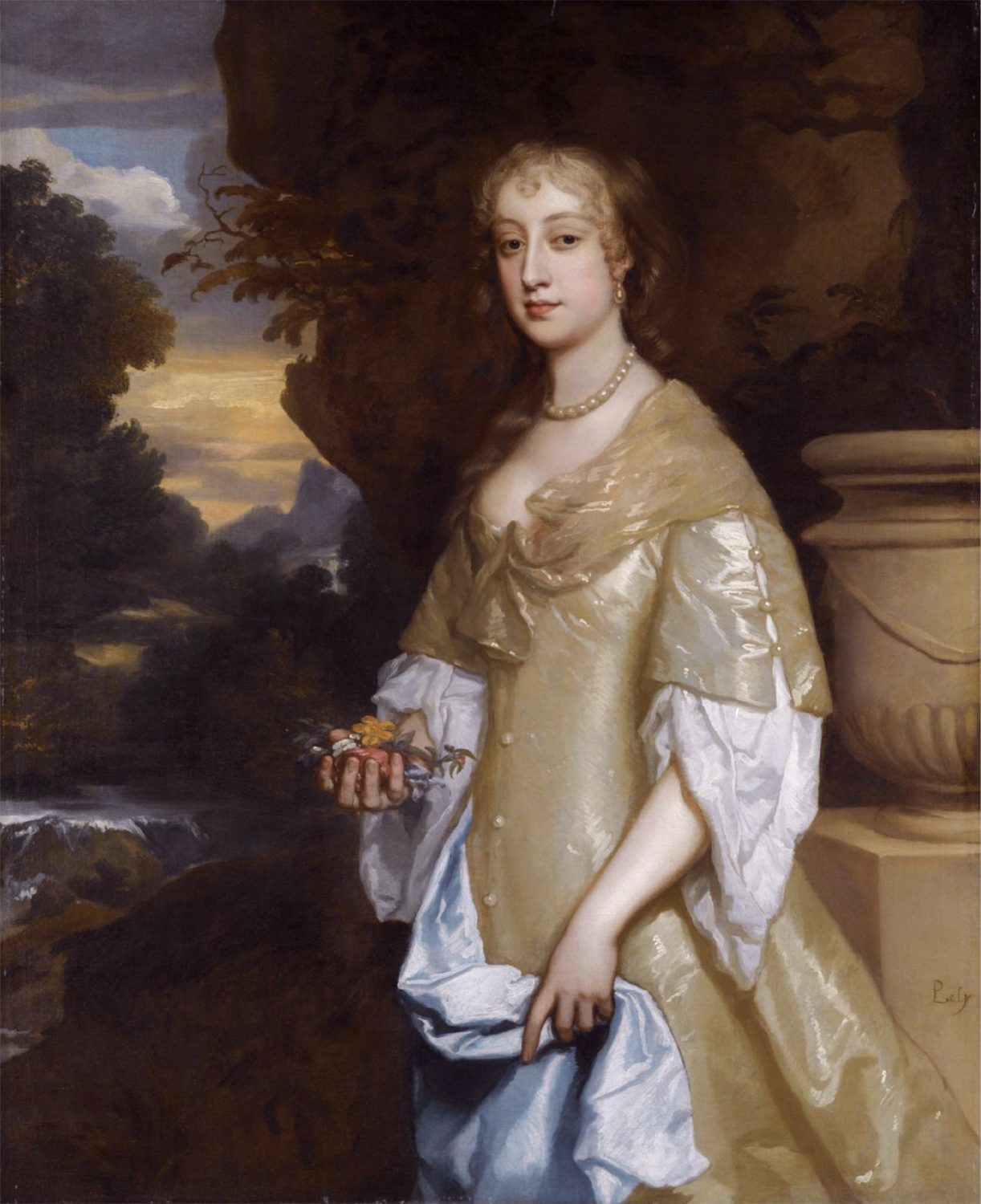
Frances Bard, Rupert's mistress, by Peter Lely

Following the Restoration of the monarchy under Charles II in 1660, Rupert returned to England, where Charles had already largely completed the process of balancing the different factions across the country in a new administration. Since most of the better government posts were already taken, Rupert's employment was limited, although Charles rewarded him with the second highest pension he had granted, £4,000 a year. Rupert's close family ties to King Charles were critical to his warm reception; following the deaths of the Duke of Gloucester and Princess Mary, Rupert was the King's closest adult relation in England after his brother, the Duke of York, and so a key member of the new regime. Rupert, as the Duke of Cumberland, resumed his seat in the House of Lords. For the first time in his life, Rupert's financial position was relatively secure, and he had matured. Near-contemporaries described how "his temper was less explosive than formerly and his judgement sounder". Rupert continued to serve as an admiral in the Royal Navy throughout the period, ultimately rising to the rank of "General at Sea and Land".

=== Restoration statesman ===
Rupert was appointed to the King's Privy Council in 1662, taking roles on the Foreign Affairs Committee, the Admiralty Committee and the Tangier Committee. Accounts vary of Rupert's role in all these committees of government. Samuel Pepys, no friend of Rupert's, sat on the Tangier Committee with him and later declared that all Rupert did was to laugh and swear occasionally: other records, such as those of the Foreign Affairs Committee, show him taking a full and active role in proceedings.

In 1668, the King appointed Rupert to be the Constable of Windsor Castle. Rupert was already one of the Knights of the Garter, who had their headquarters at the castle, and was a close companion of the King, who would wish to be suitably entertained at the castle. Rupert immediately began to reorder the castle's defences, sorting out the garrison's accommodation, repairing the Devil's Tower, reconstructing the real tennis court and improving the castle's hunting estate. Rupert acquired his own apartments in the castle, which were recorded as being "very singular" with some decorated with an "extraordinary" number of "pikes, muskets, pistols, bandoliers, holsters, drums, back, breast, and head pieces", and his inner chambers "hung with tapisserie, curious and effeminate pictures". King Charles II and Rupert spent much time together over the years hunting and playing tennis together at Windsor, and Rupert was also a close companion of James, the Duke of York. Rupert was considered by Pepys to be among the four best tennis players in England.

Rupert became romantically involved with Frances Bard (1646–1708), the daughter of the English explorer and Civil War veteran Henry Bard. Frances claimed to have secretly married Rupert in 1664, although this was denied by him and no firm proof exists to support the claim. Rupert acknowledged the son he had with Frances, Dudley Bard (1666–86), often called "Dudley Rupert", who was schooled at Eton College. In 1673, Rupert was urged by Charles Louis to return home, marry and father an heir to the Palatinate, as it appeared likely that Charles Louis's own son would not survive childhood. Rupert refused, and remained in England.

=== Career in the Restoration navy ===
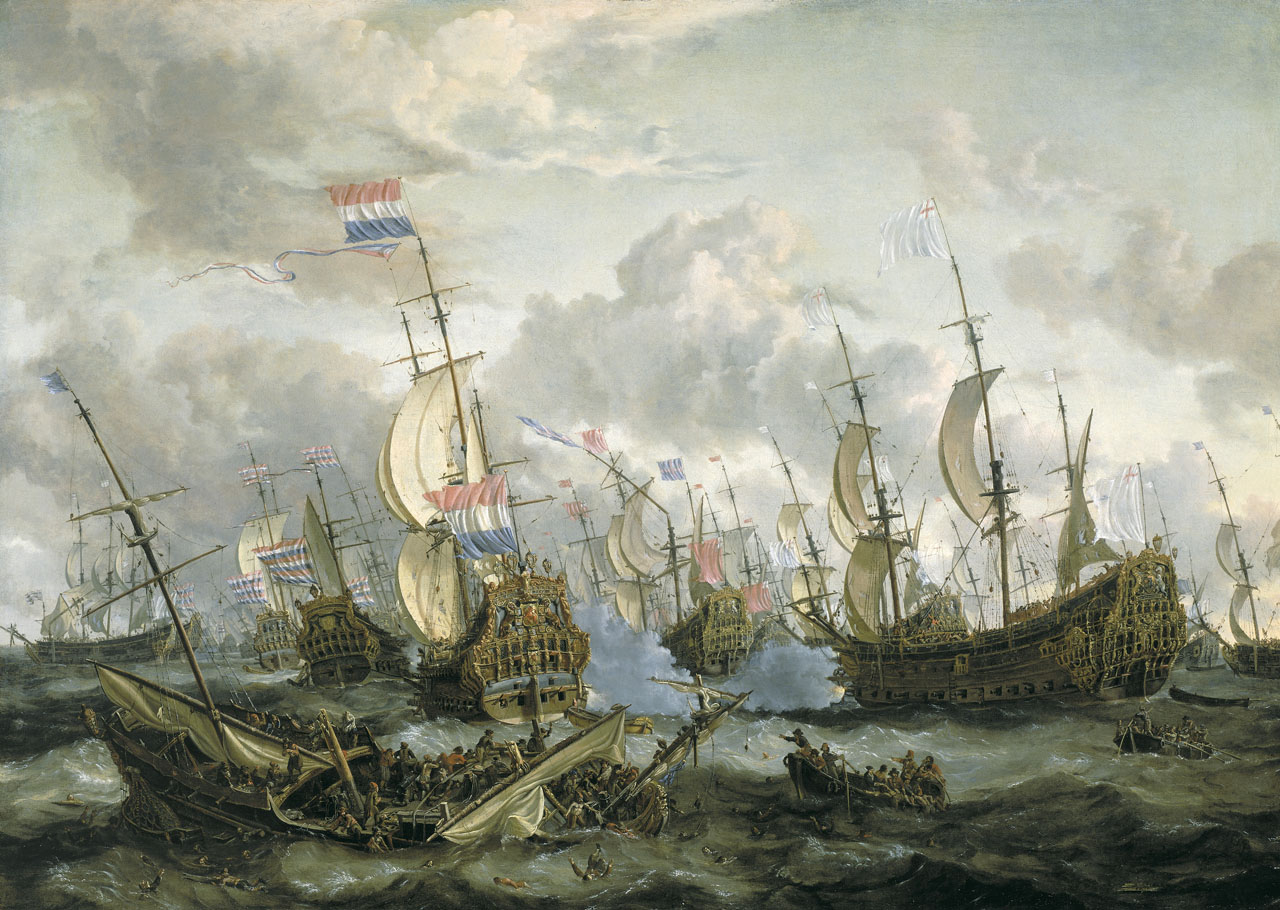
The Four Days' Battle, 1–4 June 1666, by Abraham Storck, during which Rupert's new aggressive fleet tactics were first applied

For much of the 17th century, England was embroiled in conflict with commercial rival Holland through the Anglo-Dutch Wars. Rupert became closely involved in these as a senior admiral to King Charles II, rising to command the Royal Navy by the end of his career. Although several famous admirals of the day had previously been army commanders, including Blake and Monck, they had commanded relatively small land forces and Rupert was still relatively unusual for the period in having both practical experience of commanding large land armies and having extensive naval experience from his campaigns in the 1650s.

At the start of the Second Anglo-Dutch War (1665–1667), Rupert was appointed as one of the three squadron commanders of the English fleet, under the overall command of the Duke of York, taking HMS Royal James as his flagship. As the commander of the White Squadron, Rupert fought at the Battle of Lowestoft in 1665, breaking through the enemy defences at a critical moment; Rupert's leg was injured in the battle, an injury that caused him ongoing pain. Recalled to accompany the King during the plague that was sweeping London, Rupert continued to argue in favour of the fleet's seeking a set-piece engagement with the Dutch that would force the Dutch back to the negotiating table. The following year, Rupert was made joint commander of the fleet with Monck and given the opportunity to put this plan into practice. In June 1666, they fought the Dutch at the Four Days' Battle, one of the longest naval battles in history; the battle saw the new aggressive tactics of Rupert and Monck applied, resulting in "a sight unique till then in sailing-ship warfare, the English beating upwind and breaking the enemy's line from leeward." However, the Four Days' Battle was considered a victory for the Dutch, but the St. James's Day Battle the following month allowed Rupert and Monck to use the same tactics to inflict heavy damage on the Dutch and the battle resulted in a significant English victory. The Dutch however would see a favourable end to the war with the decisive Raid on the Medway.

Rupert also played a prominent role in the Third Anglo-Dutch War (1672–74). This time Louis XIV of France was a key English ally against Holland, and it was decided that the French would form a squadron in a combined fleet. The English fleet had been much expanded, and Rupert had three ships, HMS Royal Charles, HMS Royal James and HMS Royal Oak, equipped with a high-specification, annealed and lathe-produced gun of his own design, the Rupertinoe. The cost of the weapon—three times that of a normal gun—prevented its wider deployment in the fleet. The French role in the conflict proved a problem when Charles turned to the appointment of an admiral. Rupert's objection to the French alliance was well known, and accordingly the King appointed the Duke of York to the role instead. Rupert was instead instructed to take over the Duke's work at the Admiralty, which he did with gusto. The Allied naval plans were stalled after the Duke's inconclusive battle with the Dutch at Solebay.

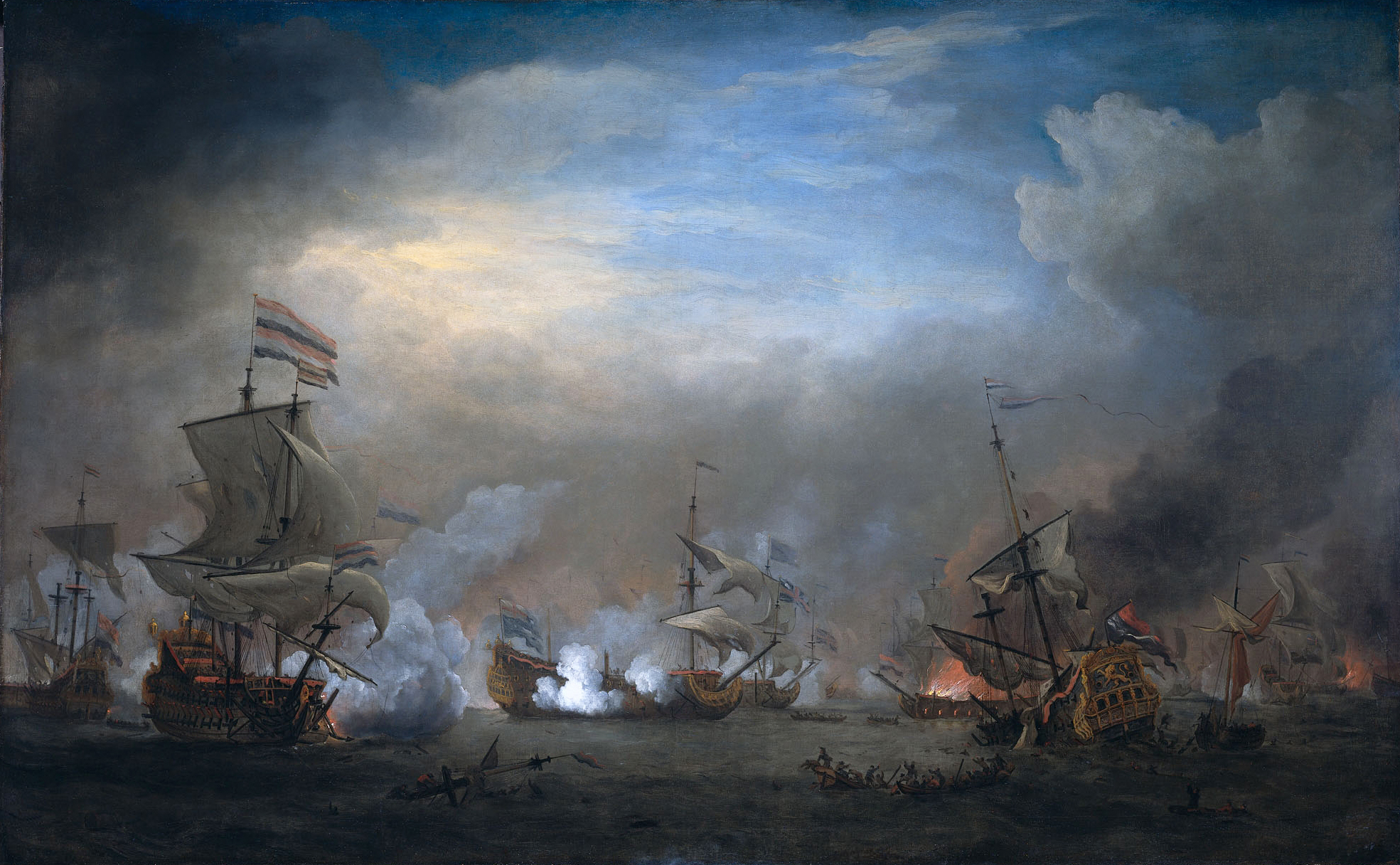
The Battle of Texel, by Willem van de Velde the Younger, a Dutch victory which marked the end of Rupert's career as a sea admiral

The English plan for 1673 centred on first achieving naval dominance, followed by landing an army in Zeeland. The King appointed the Duke as supreme commander, with Rupert as his deputy, combining the ranks of general and vice admiral of England. During the winter of 1672, however, Charles—still (legitimately) childless—decided that the risk to the Duke, his heir, was too great and made Rupert supreme Allied commander in his place. Rupert began the 1673 campaign against the Dutch knowing the logistical support for his fleet remained uncertain, with many ships undermanned. The result was the Battle of Schooneveld in June and the Battle of Texel in August, a controversial sequence of engagements in which, at a minimum, poor communications between the French and English commanders assisted the Dutch victories. Many English commentators were harsher, blaming the French for failing to fully engage in the battles and Rupert—having cautioned against the alliance in the first place—was popularly hailed as a hero. Rupert finally retired from active seagoing command later that year.

Rupert had a characteristic style as an admiral; he relied upon "energetic personal leadership backed by close contact with his officers"; having decided how to proceed in a naval campaign, however, it could be difficult for his staff to change his mind. Recent work on Rupert's role as a commander has also highlighted the progress the prince made in formulating the way that orders were given to the British fleet. Fleet communications were limited during the period, and the traditional orders from admirals before a battle were accordingly quite rigid, limiting a captain's independence in the battle. Rupert played a key part in the conferences held by the Duke of York in 1665 to review tactics and operational methods from the First Anglo-Dutch War, and put these into practice before the St James Day battle. These instructions and supplementary instructions to ships' captains, which attempted to balance an adherence to standing orders with the need to exploit emerging opportunities in a battle, proved heavily influential over the next hundred years and shaped the idea that an aggressive fighting spirit should be at the core of British naval doctrine.

After 1673, Rupert remained a senior member of the Royal Navy and Charles's administration. Rupert allied himself with Lord Shaftesbury on matters of foreign policy, but remained loyal to King Charles II on other issues, and was passionate about protecting the royal prerogative. As a consequence, he opposed Parliament's plan in 1677 to appoint him to Lord High Admiral—on the basis that only the King should be allowed to propose such appointments—but noted that he was willing to become Admiral if the King wished him to do so. The King's solution was to establish a small, empowered Admiralty Commission, of which Rupert became the first commissioner. As a result, from 1673 to 1679 Rupert was able to focus on ensuring a closer regulation of manning, gunning and the selection of officers. He was also involved in setting priorities between the different theatres of operations that the Royal Navy was now involved in around the world.

== Later life ==
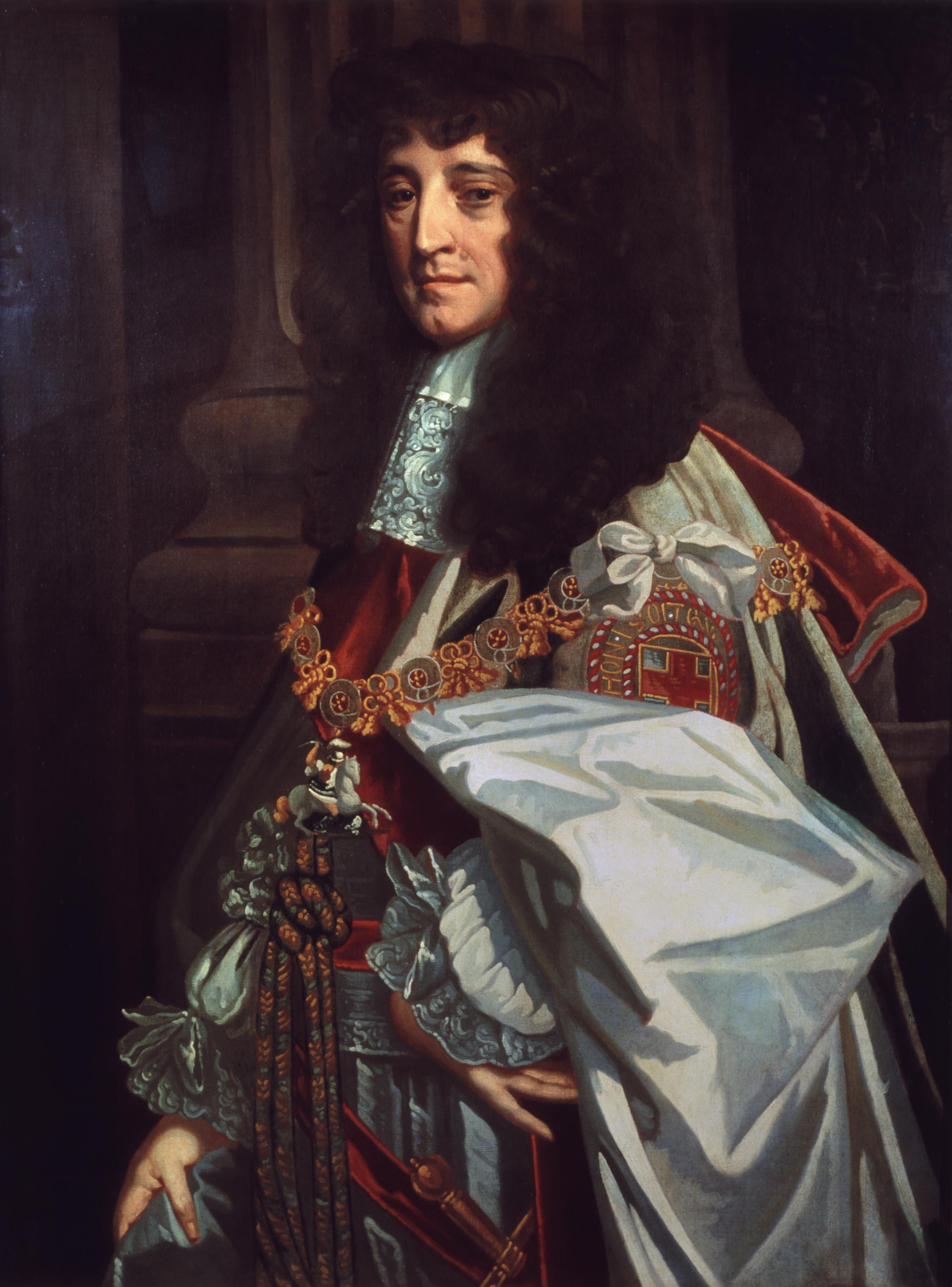
An older Rupert, painted in 1670 by Sir Peter Lely

After the end of his seagoing naval career, Rupert continued to be actively involved in both government and science, although he was increasingly removed from current politics. To the younger members of the court, the prince appeared increasingly distant—almost from a different era. The Count de Gramont described Rupert as "brave and courageous even to rashness, but cross-grained and incorrigibly obstinate... he was polite, even to excess, unseasonably; but haughty, and even brutal, when he ought to have been gentle and courteous... his manners were ungracious: he had a dry hard-favoured visage, and a stern look, even when he wished to please; but, when he was out of humour, he was the true picture of reproof". Rupert's health during this period was also less robust; his head wound from his employment in France required a painful trepanning treatment, his leg wound continued to hurt and he still suffered from the malaria he had caught while in the Gambia.

=== Colonial administration ===
Rupert had demonstrated an interest in colonial issues for many years. On arriving in England in 1663, he had encouraged the government to continue his own exploration of the Gambia in an attempt to find gold, leading to Robert Holmes's expedition the following year. Rupert was an active shareholder in the Company of Royal Adventurers Trading into Africa that was established as a result in 1662. The company continued operations for the next eight years, with backers including the King, the Duke of York and the Royal Society, with operations including engaging in the West African slave trade until it folded in 1670. It is unclear whether Rupert directly owned any slaves, however his investments reached £800 and his involvement key in the development of the state-backed slave trade. The operations of the Company of Royal Adventurers Trading into Africa merged with those of the Gambia Merchants' Company into the new Royal African Company, with a royal charter to right to set up forts and factories, maintain troops, and exercise martial law in West Africa, in pursuit of trade in gold, silver, and slaves; Rupert was the third named member of the company's board.

By then, however, Rupert's attention had turned to North America. The French explorers Pierre-Esprit Radisson and Médard des Groseilliers had come to England after conducting a joint exploration of the Hudson's Bay region in 1659; there their account attracted the attention of the King and Rupert. Rupert put an initial investment of £270 of his own money into a proposal for a fresh expedition and set about raising more; despite setbacks, including the Great Fire of London, by 1667 he had formed a private syndicate and leased the Eaglet from the King for the expedition. The Eaglet failed, but her sister vessel, the Nonsuch, made a successful expedition, returning in 1669 with furs worth £1,400 (equivalent to £263,811 in 2025). In 1670, the King approved the charter for "The Governor and Company of Adventurers of England trading into Hudson's Bay" that would form the Hudson's Bay Company, which was granted a trading monopoly in the whole Hudson Bay watershed area, an immense territory named Rupert's Land, with Rupert appointed the first Governor. Rupert's first company secretary was Sir James Hayes and Radisson named the Hayes River, in present-day Manitoba, in his honour. The company continued to prosper, forming the basis for much of the commercial activity of colonial Canada. Rupert's role in colonial commerce was marked by his being asked to lay the cornerstone of the new Royal Exchange in 1670, and being made one of its first councillors. (Note: In 1869 control of the territory of the Hudson's Bay Company reverted to the British and Canadian governments.)

=== Science and the Royal Society ===
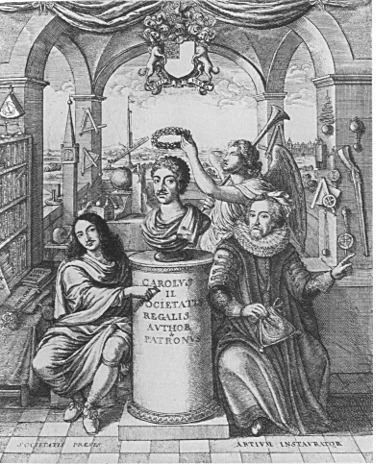
Rupert was a founding member of the Royal Society, which, as shown in this 1667 engraving celebrating its creation, mirrored his wide interests in science and technology.

After Rupert's retirement from active seafaring in around 1674, he was able to spend more time engaged in scientific research and became credited with many inventions and discoveries, although some subsequently turned out to be the innovative introduction of European inventions into England. Rupert converted some of the apartments at Windsor Castle to a luxury laboratory, complete with forges, instruments, and raw materials, from where he conducted a range of experiments.

Rupert had already become the third founding member of the scientific Royal Society, being referred to by contemporaries as a "philosophic warrior", and guided the Society as a Councillor during its early years. Very early on in the Society's history, Rupert demonstrated Prince Rupert's drops to King Charles II and the Society, glass teardrops which explode when the tail is cracked; although credited with their invention at the time, later interpretations suggest that he was instead responsible for the introduction of an existing European discovery into England. He demonstrated a new device for lifting water at the Royal Society, and received attention for his process for "painting colours on marble, which, when polished, became permanent". During this time, Rupert also formulated a mathematical question concerning the paradox that a cube can pass through a slightly smaller cube; Rupert questioned how large a cube had to be in order to fit. The question of Prince Rupert's cube was first solved by the Dutch mathematician Pieter Nieuwland. Rupert was also known for his success in breaking cypher codes.

Many of Rupert's inventions were military. After designing the Rupertinoe naval gun, Rupert erected a watermill on Hackney Marshes for a revolutionary method of boring guns; however, his secret died with him, and the enterprise failed. Rupert enjoyed other military problems, and took to manufacturing gun locks; he devised both a gun that fired multiple rounds at high speed, and a "handgun with rotating barrels". He is credited with the invention of a form of gunpowder, which when demonstrated to the Royal Society in 1663, had a force of over ten times that of regular powder; a better method for using gunpowder in mining; and a torpedo. He also developed a form of grapeshot for use by artillery. Rupert also focussed on naval inventions: he devised a balancing mechanism to allow improved quadrant measurements at sea, and produced a diving engine for retrieving objects on the ocean floor. While recovering from his trepanning treatment Rupert set about inventing new surgical equipment to improve future operations.

Other parts of Rupert's scientific work lay in the field of metallurgy. Rupert invented a new brass alloy, slightly darker in hue than regular brass involving three parts of copper to one part of zinc, combined with charcoal; this became known as "Prince's metal" in his honour—sometimes also referred to as "Bristol Brass". Rupert invented the alloy in order to improve naval artillery, but it also became used as a replacement for gold in decorations. Rupert was also credited with having devised an exceptional method for tempering kirby fish hooks, and for casting objects into an appearance of perspective. He also invented an improved method for manufacturing shot of varying sizes in 1663, that was later refined by the scientist Robert Hooke, one of Rupert's Royal Society friends during the period. In particular he is credited with developing the process of casting tiny lead pellets or birdshot by pouring molten lead through a colander or sieve and allowing the droplets to fall several inches into water. Such shot found on archaeological sites, frequently on 17th- and 18th-century shipwrecks, are often referred to as Rupert shot by archaeologists.

== Family ==
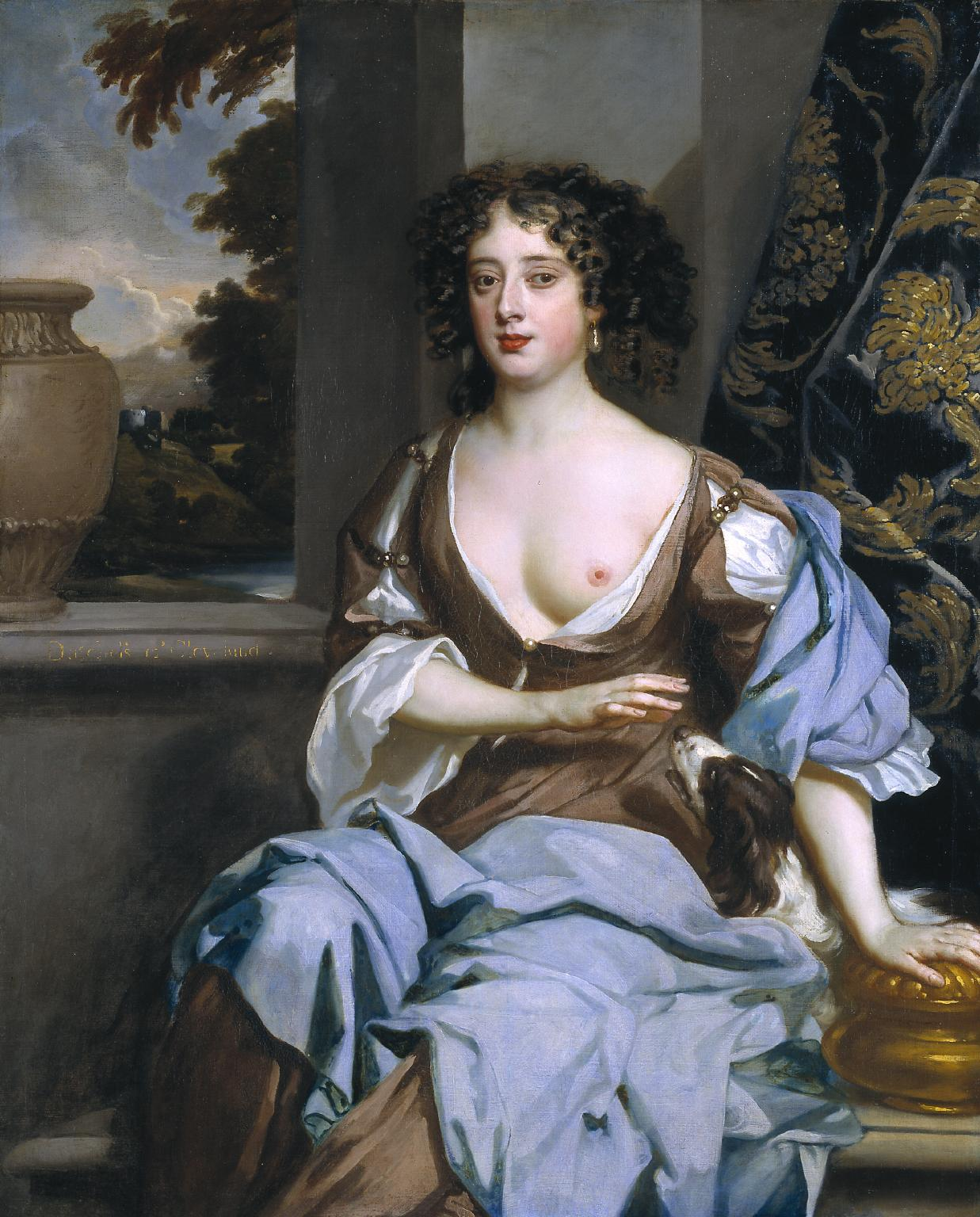
Actress Margaret Hughes, Rupert's mistress in later life, by Sir Peter Lely, c. 1670

Towards the end of his life Rupert fell in love with an attractive Drury Lane actress named Margaret "Peg" Hughes. Rupert became involved with her during the late 1660s, leaving his previous mistress, Frances Bard, with whom he had a son, Dudley; although Hughes appears to have held out from reciprocating his attentions with the aim of negotiating a suitable settlement. Hughes rapidly received advancement through his patronage; she became a member of the King's Company by 1669, giving her status and immunity from arrest for debt, and was painted four times by Sir Peter Lely, the foremost court artist of the day.

Despite being encouraged to do so, Rupert did not marry Hughes, but acknowledged their daughter, Ruperta (born in 1673 and who later became Mrs Emanuel Howe). Hughes lived an expensive lifestyle during the 1670s, enjoying gambling and jewels; Rupert gave her at least £20,000 worth of jewellery during their relationship, including several items from the Palatinate royal collection. Hughes continued to act even after Ruperta's birth, returning to the stage in 1676 with the prestigious Duke's Company at the Dorset Garden Theatre, near the Strand in London. The next year Rupert established Hughes with a "grand building" worth £25,000 that he bought in Hammersmith from Sir Nicholas Crispe. Rupert seems rather to have enjoyed the family lifestyle, commenting that his young daughter "already rules the whole house and sometimes argues with her mother, which makes us all laugh."

== Death ==
Rupert died at his house at Spring Gardens, Westminster, on 29 November 1682 after a bout of pleurisy, and was buried in the Mary, Queen of Scots vault at Westminster Abbey on 6 December in a state funeral. Rupert left most of his estate, worth about £12,000 (approx. £2.3million in 2026), equally to Hughes and Ruperta. Hughes had an "uncomfortable widowhood" without Rupert's support, allegedly not helped by her unproductive gambling.

Presents from Rupert such as his mother's earrings were sold to the Sarah Churchill, Duchess of Marlborough, while a pearl necklace given by Elector Frederick to Electress Elizabeth was sold to fellow actress Nell Gwynn. Hughes sold the house in Hammersmith to two London merchants: Timothy Lannoy and George Treadwell—it was then purchased by the Margrave of Brandenburg-Ansbach and became known as Brandenburg (or Brandenburgh) House.

Ruperta later married Emanuel Howe, future MP and English general, and had five children, Sophia, William, Emanuel, James and Henrietta. Through William's daughter, Mary, Rupert is an ancestor of the Bromley baronets.

Rupert's son, Dudley Bard, became a military officer, who was frequently known as "Captain Rupert". He died in his late teens at the siege of Buda in 1686 during the Great Turkish War.

== Legacy ==
According to Ian Gentles:

Charles I's nephew, Prince Rupert of the Rhine, was a famed warrior who won hardly any battles on land or sea. Beloved by his men for his death-defying courage and his high sense of military honour, he was nonetheless a bad tempered and arrogant leader. His defects of character became more accentuated with age. Yet he remains one of the most romantic figures in English history, admired for his reckless cavalry charges, and his equally reckless naval charges against the much stronger Parliamentary, and later Dutch, fleets. ... The prince alienated many because he was frequently irascible, tactless, impatient, and—most seriously—a poor judge of character.

Prince Rupert's memory is well attested in the geography of Canada. The lands of the Hudson's Bay Company, being all the land drained by rivers flowing into Hudson Bay, were known as Rupert's Land from 1670 until 1870. The Anglican Diocese of Rupert's Land, based in Winnipeg, Manitoba, is the relic of this period, as are Prince Rupert Avenue, Rupert Avenue, and Rupertsland Avenue in Winnipeg. Elsewhere in Canada, the city of Prince Rupert, British Columbia, the community of Prince Rupert in the city of Edmonton, Alberta and the Rupert River in Quebec are all named after the Prince. Rupert's Bay on St Helena may also be named after him. In Bristol, England, there was a street named to commemorate Prince Rupert. A secondary school in Wilhelmshaven, Germany, for children of military personnel living in British Forces Germany, was named Prince Rupert School.

== Genealogical table ==
Rupert's relationship with the House of Stuart (selective chart)

James I of England; 1566–1625	Anne of Denmark; 1574–1619
Henry Frederick; 1594–1612	Frederick V of the Palatinate; 1596–1632	Elizabeth Stuart; 1596–1662	Charles I of England; 1600–1649	Henrietta Maria of France; 1609–1669
Charles I Louis, Elector Palatine; 1617–1680	Rupert; 1619–1682	Maurice; 1621–1652	Sophia of Hanover; 1630–1714	Charles II of England; 1630–1685	Mary; 1631–1660	James II of England; 1633–1701	Henry; 1640–1660
George I of Great Britain; 1660–1727	William III of England; 1650–1702	Mary II of England; 1662–1694	Anne of Great Britain; 1665–1714	James Francis Edward Stuart; 1688–1766 "The Old Pretender"

== In fiction ==
- Prince Rupert is the protagonist of Poul Anderson's alternative history/fantasy book A Midsummer Tempest, where the Prince, with the help of various Shakespearean characters who are actual persons in this timeline, eventually defeats Cromwell and wins the English Civil War.
- Prince Rupert is the key character in the King Crimson song "Lizard" from their 1970 album of the same name. The 23-minute suite includes several sections, one named Prince Rupert Awakes and another The Battle of Glass Tears (an artistic reference to the battle of Naseby) in turn including a subsection called Prince Rupert's Lament.
- Prince Rupert appears in The Oak Apple and The Black Pearl, volumes 4 and 5 of The Morland Dynasty, a series of historical novels by author Cynthia Harrod-Eagles. He is assisted during the Civil War by the staunchly Royalist fictional Morland family, and is father to the illegitimate Annunciata Morland, with whom he has a complicated relationship.
- Prince Rupert and his sister Elisabeth are minor characters in Eric Flint's 1632 series books Grantville Gazette IV and Grantville Gazette VI.
- Prince Rupert is the protagonist of Margaret Irwin's novel The Stranger Prince and appears in her later novel The Bride. Both novels deal with the Civil War period.
- Prince Rupert is the subject of Samuel Edwards's biographical novel The White Plume, published by William Morrow and Company Ltd. in 1961, a semi-fictional account of his life from his late teens until his marriage to Peg (Margaret Hughes).
- Prince Rupert's Tower is the name given to a Georgian lock-up in the Everton area of Liverpool. Rupert stayed in the area during the siege of Liverpool.

=== Film and television ===
- Rupert was portrayed by Nigel Bruce in the 1940 film Hudson's Bay.
- Rupert was portrayed by Timothy Dalton in the 1970 film Cromwell.
- Rupert was portrayed by Christopher Baines in the 1983–85 TV series By the Sword Divided.
- Harry Lloyd played Rupert in the 2008 TV drama The Devil's Whore.
- Rupert was portrayed by Will Bowden in the 2015 Dutch film Michiel de Ruyter.

== See also ==
- Canadian locations named after Rupert

== Bibliography ==
- Beckman, Johann (1846). Francis, William; Griffiths, John Williams (eds.). A History of Inventions, Discoveries, and Origins, Volume 1. Translated by Johnston, William. London: Henry G. Bohn.
- Brannt, William Theodore; Krupp, Alfred; Wildberger, Andreas (2009). The Metallic Alloys: A Practical Guide. BiblioBazaar, LLC.
- Coxe, John Redman (1814). The Emporium of Arts and Sciences, Volume 3. Philadelphia: J. Delaplaine.
- Croft, Hallard T., Richard K. Guy and K. J. Falconer (1994). Unsolved Problems in Geometry. New York: Springer.
- Dalton, Anthony (2010). River Rough, River Smooth: Adventures on Manitoba's Historic Hayes River. Toronto: Dundurn.
- Dircks, Henry (1867). Inventors and Inventions.
- Endsor, Richard (2009). Restoration Warship: The Design, Construction and Career of a Third Rate of Charles II's Navy. London: Anova Books.
- Fergusson, Bernard (1952). Rupert of the Rhine. London: Collins.
- Granger, James (1821). A Biographical History of England: From Egbert the Great to the Revolution. London: William Baynes.
- Griffiths, Antony (1996). Prints and Printmaking: An Introduction to the History and Techniques. Berkeley: University of California Press.
- Highfill, Philip H., Kalman A. Burnim and Edward A. Langhans (1982). Volume 8 of A Biographical Dictionary of Actors, Actresses, Musicians, Dancers, Managers and Other Stage Personnel in London, 1660–1800. Southern Illinois University Press.
- Hind, Arthur M (1963). A History of Engraving and Etching: From the 15th Century to the Year 1914. New York: Dover.
- Hone, William (1841). The Year Book of Daily Recreation and Information: Concerning Remarkable Men and Manners, Times and Seasons, Solemnities and Merry-makings, Antiquities and Novelties on the plan of the Every-day Book and Table. Tegg.
- Kitson, Frank (1999). Prince Rupert: Admiral and General-at-Sea. London: Constable.
- Lewis, Michael (1957). The History of the British Navy. London: Pelican Books.
- Newman, P. R. (2006). Atlas of the English Civil War. London: Routledge.
- Palmer, Michael A. (2007). Command at Sea: Naval Command and Control Since the Sixteenth Century. Cambridge, MA: Harvard.
- Purkiss, Diane (2001). Desire and Its Deformities: Fantasies of Witchcraft in the English Civil War. in Levack, Brian P. ed., New Perspectives on Witchcraft, Magic, and Demonology: Witchcraft in the British Isles and New England. London: Routledge.
- Purkiss, Diane (2007). The English Civil War: A People's History. London: Harper.
- Salaman, Malcolm (2005). The Old Engravers of England in Their Relation to Contemporary Life and Art, 1540–1800. Kessinger Publishing.
- Spencer, Charles (2007). Prince Rupert: The Last Cavalier. London, UK: Phoenix. ISBN 978-0-297-84610-9.
- Urbanowicz, Gary. R. (2002). Badges of the Bravest: A Pictorial History of Fire Departments in New York City. Turner Publishing Company.
- Warburton, Eliot (1849). Memoirs of Prince Rupert, and the Cavaliers. London: R. Bentley.
- Wedgwood, C. V. (1970). The King's War: 1641–1647. London: Fontana.

Political offices
Preceded by The Duke of Hamilton	Master of the Horse; 1653–1655	Succeeded by The Duke of Albermale
Preceded by King Charles II	Lord High Admiral; 1668–1682	In commission Lord Capell as First Lord Title next held by King Charles II
Honorary titles
Preceded by The Viscount Mordaunt	Constable of Windsor Castle; 1668–1682	Succeeded by The Duke of Norfolk
Preceded by The Viscount Mordaunt	Lord Lieutenant of Surrey; 1675–1682	Succeeded by The Duke of Norfolk
Preceded by The Lord Lovelace	Lord Lieutenant of Berkshire; 1670–1682	Succeeded by The Duke of Norfolk
Peerage of England
New creation	Duke of Cumberland; 1644–1682	Extinct
