= The Great Executioner =

Mezzotint by Prince Rupert of the Rhine

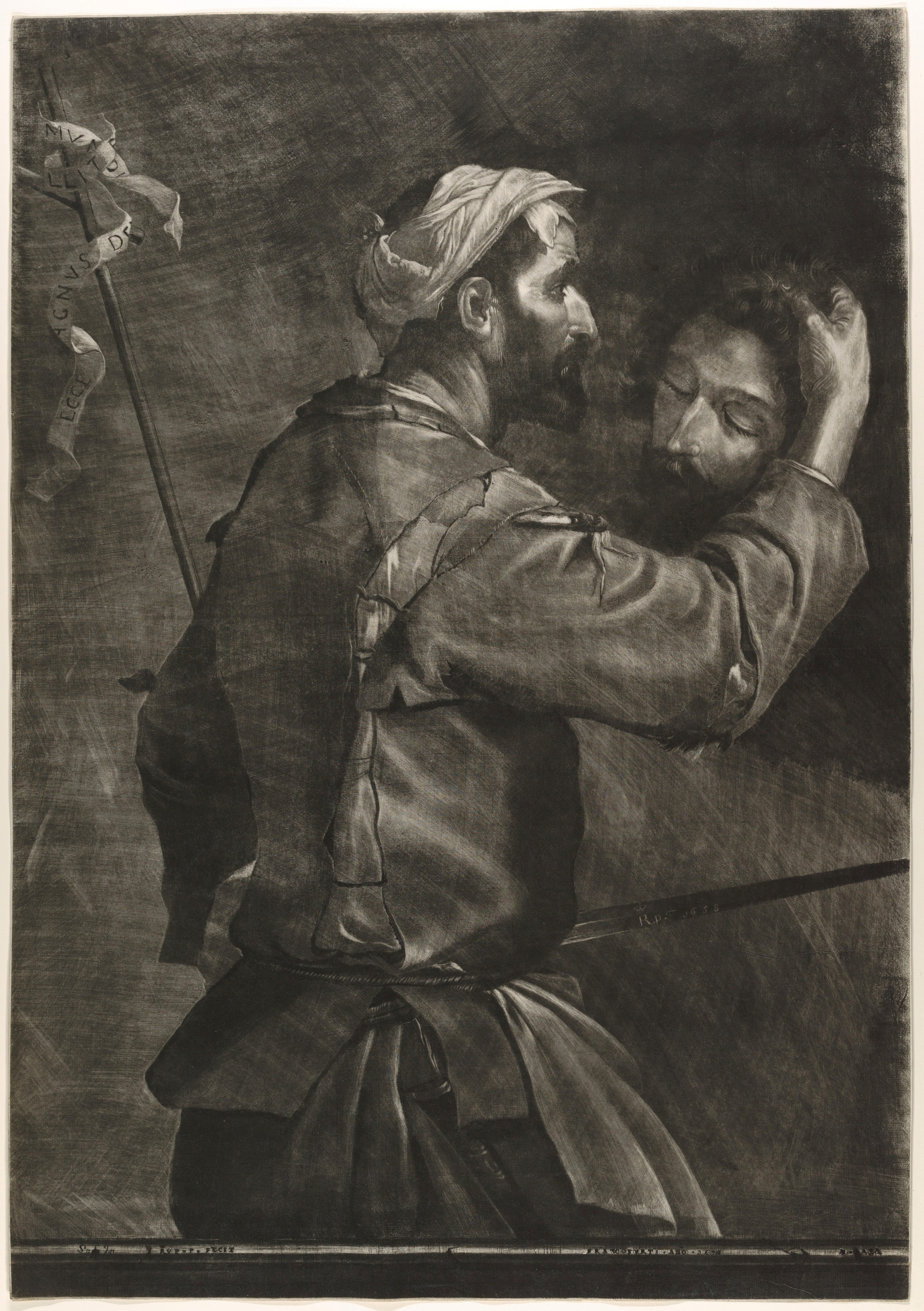
- Artist: Prince Rupert of the Rhine
- Year: 1658
- Type: Mezzotint
- Dimensions: 63.3 cm × 44.2 cm (24.9 in × 17.4 in)
- Location: Metropolitan Museum of Art, New York

The Great Executioner is a mezzotint by the soldier and amateur artist Prince Rupert of the Rhine (1619-1682), finished in 1658.

The subject of the picture is the execution of John the Baptist, after Jusepe de Ribera's painting. Rupert had become interested in mezzotint design during his time in Europe during the Interregnum following the English Civil War, and there is an extensive debate over Rupert's role in the invention of the technique itself. Rupert's mezzotint works were popularised by the print collector John Evelyn after the Restoration, and became much admired across Europe. The Great Executioner is generally considered to be one of Rupert's finest works; produced in 1658, it is still regarded by critics as containing 'brilliance and energy', 'superb', 'one of the greatest mezzotints', and 'among the finest [mezzotints] ever produced'. Rupert's name can be seen signed along the executioner's blade.

== See also ==
- Prince Rupert of the Rhine
