= Rupertinoe =

The Rupertinoe was an advanced naval gun designed by, and named after, Prince Rupert of the Rhine in the 17th century. The name is actually a mis-transcription of the words "Rupert inv" found on one of the cannon.

== Details ==
Naval warfare in the Restoration period placed an emphasis on naval firepower; as one writer has put it, warships had evolved into "floating artillery emplacements". The Rupertinoe gun was a response to this challenge. Designed by Prince Rupert, an experienced naval commander and senior admiral of the Royal Navy, the gun was intended for use against the Dutch during the Anglo-Dutch Wars.

The Rupertinoe was a high specification, annealed and lathe produced gun made - experimentally - at Rupert's foundry at Windsor Castle reflecting Rupert's scientific interests in metallurgy—he was the third founding member of the Royal Society. Unfortunately the high cost of the gun—three times the price of a regular weapon—meant that by the Third Anglo-Dutch War (1672-4) only three ships had been equipped with it: the Royal Charles, the Royal James and the Royal Oak. Later guns were produced in the Weald by John Browne and his son but led to their financial downfall. The guns cost £60 per ton as Rupert received a royalty of £20 per ton and as there were no perceived advantages purchase was soon discontinued. The cost of the gun led to a fraud investigation by the Naval Commissioner Samuel Pepys, although no evidence to support the claim was discovered.

== Bibliography ==
- Bailey, Sarah Barter. Prince Rupert's Patent Guns. Leeds, United Kingdom: Royal Armouries. (2000) ISBN 978-0948092299
- Endsor, Richard. Restoration Warship: The Design, Construction and Career of a Third Rate of Charles II's Navy. London: Anova Books. (2009)
- Kitson, Frank. Prince Rupert: Admiral and General-at-Sea. London: Constable. (1999)
- Spencer, Charles. Prince Rupert: The Last Cavalier. London: Phoenix. (2007) ISBN 978-0-297-84610-9

== See also ==
- Prince Rupert of the Rhine
