= HMS Royal James =

Several ships of the Royal Navy have borne the name HMS Royal James:

- HMS Royal James (1660), a 70-gun second-rate ship of the line launched in 1658 as the Richard, renamed in 1660 when she was reclassed as a first rate, and burnt by the Dutch in 1667.
- HMS Royal James (1671), a 100-gun first-rate ship of the line launched in 1671, and burnt in action in 1672.
- HMS Royal James (1675), a 100-gun first-rate ship of the line launched in 1675, renamed HMS Victory in 1691, rebuilt in 1695 and destroyed by fire in 1721.

== See also ==
- Stede Bonnet and Edward England, two 18th-century pirates whose ships were named Royal James.
