= HMS Royal Charles (1673) =

Ship of the line of the Royal Navy

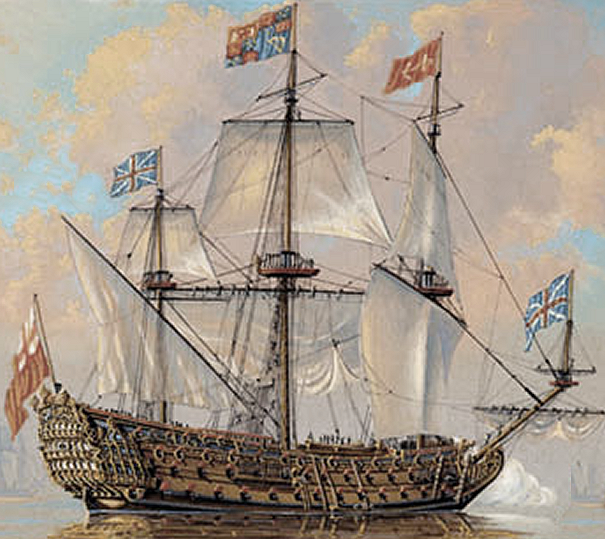

History

Great Britain
- Name: Royal Charles
- Ordered: 26 April 1671
- Builder: Anthony Deane and Daniel Furzer, Portsmouth Dockyard
- Launched: March 1673
- Commissioned: February 1673
- Renamed: Queen, 27 January 1693; Royal George, 9 September 1715; Royal Anne, 1756
- Fate: Broken up, 1767

General characteristics as built
- Class & type: 100-gun first-rate ship of the line
- Tons burthen: 1443 (bm)
- Length: 136 ft (41 m) (keel)
- Beam: 44 ft 8 in (13.61 m)
- Depth of hold: 18 ft 3 in (5.56 m)
- Propulsion: Sails
- Sail plan: Full-rigged ship
- Armament: 100 guns of various weights of shot

General characteristics after 1693 rebuild
- Class & type: 100-gun first-rate ship of the line
- Tons burthen: 1657 92/94 (bm)
- Length: 170 ft 6 in (51.97 m) (gundeck)
- Beam: 47 ft 7 in (14.50 m)
- Depth of hold: 18 ft (5.5 m)
- Propulsion: Sails
- Sail plan: Full-rigged ship
- Armament: 100 guns of various weights of shot

General characteristics after 1715 rebuild
- Class & type: 100-gun first-rate ship of the line
- Tons burthen: 1800 84/94 (bm)
- Length: 171 ft 9 in (52.35 m) (gundeck)
- Beam: 49 ft 3 in (15.01 m)
- Depth of hold: 19 ft 6 in (5.94 m)
- Propulsion: Sails
- Sail plan: Full-rigged ship
- Armament: 100 guns of various weights of shot

HMS Royal Charles was a 100-gun first-rate ship of the line of the Royal Navy, designed and built by Sir Anthony Deane at Portsmouth Dockyard, where she was launched and completed by his successor as Master Shipwright, Daniel Furzer, in March 1673. She was one of only three Royal Navy ships to be equipped with the Rupertinoe naval gun.

She was Prince Rupert of the Rhine's flagship at the battles of Schooneveld; two naval battles of the Franco-Dutch War, fought off the coast of the Netherlands on 7 June and 14 June 1673 against the fleet of the United Provinces, commanded by Michiel de Ruyter.

She was rebuilt at Woolwich Dockyard between 1691 and 1693, and renamed HMS Queen on 27 January 1693. The Queen became the flagship of Sir George Rooke and was captained by James Wishart. She was rebuilt for a second time at Woolwich, relaunching on 20 September 1715, and renamed once more, this time as HMS Royal George.

The much-rebuilt Royal George was renamed HMS Royal Anne in 1756, and was broken up in 1767.

Model on display at the Museum of Fine Arts in Boston
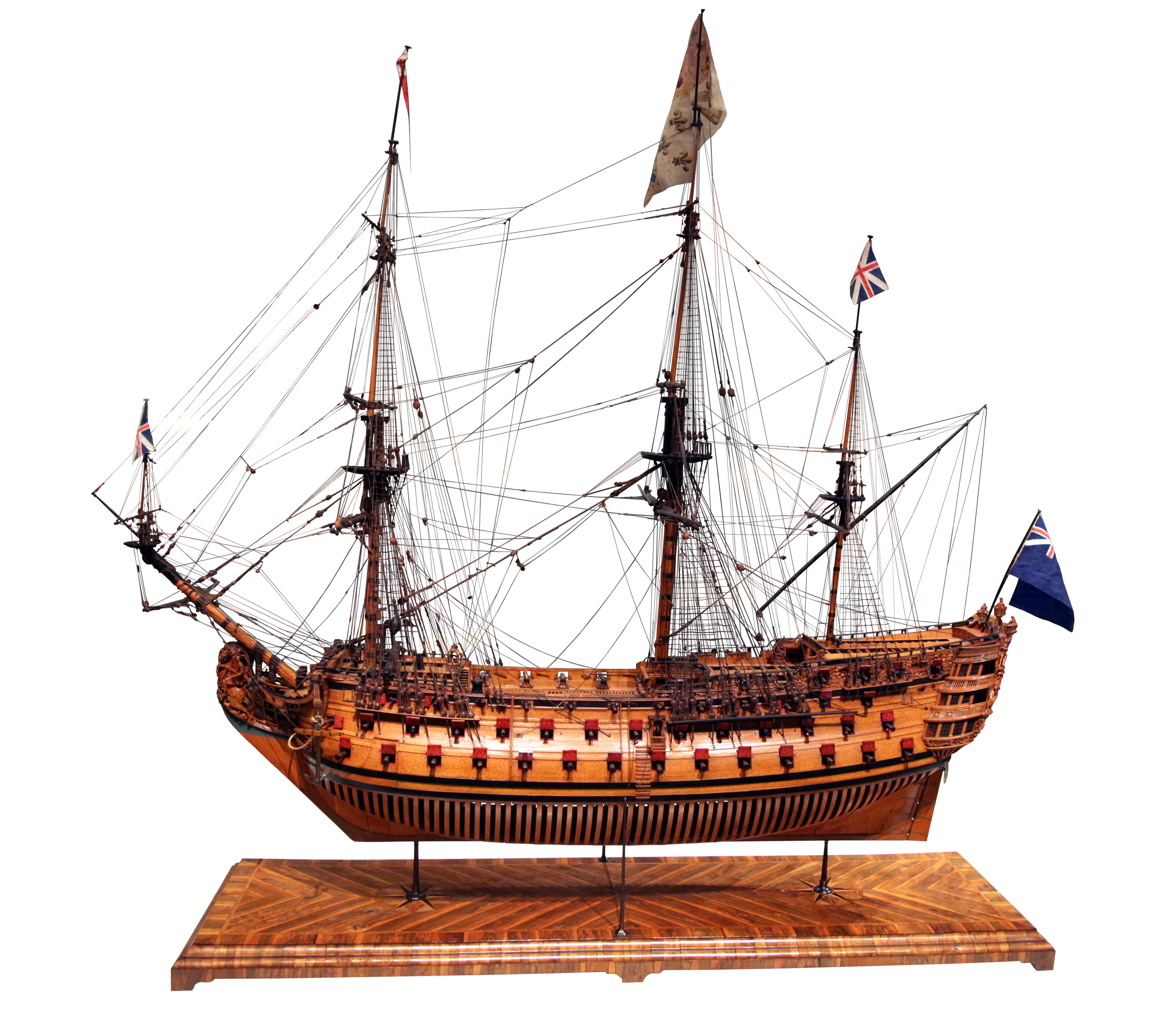

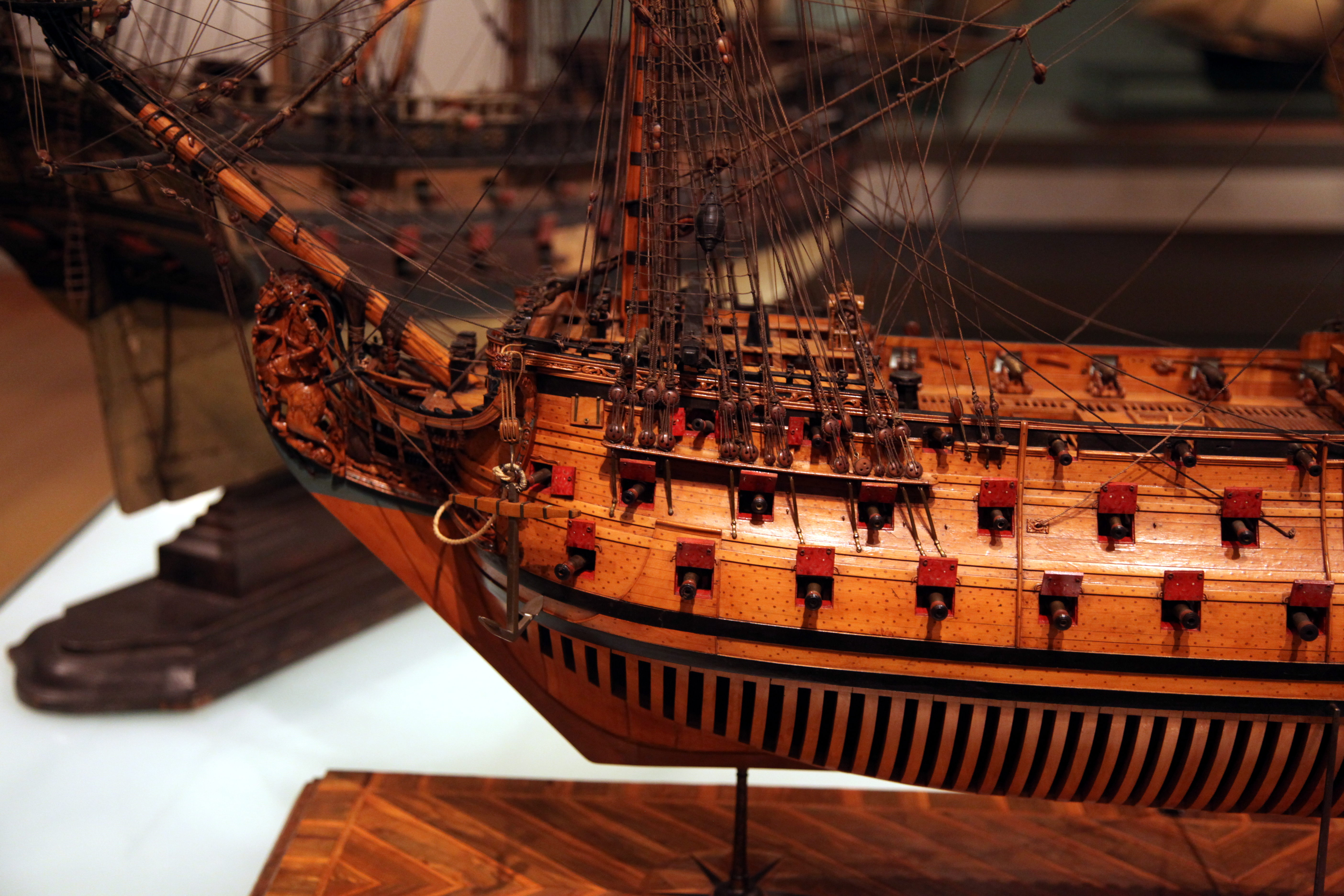

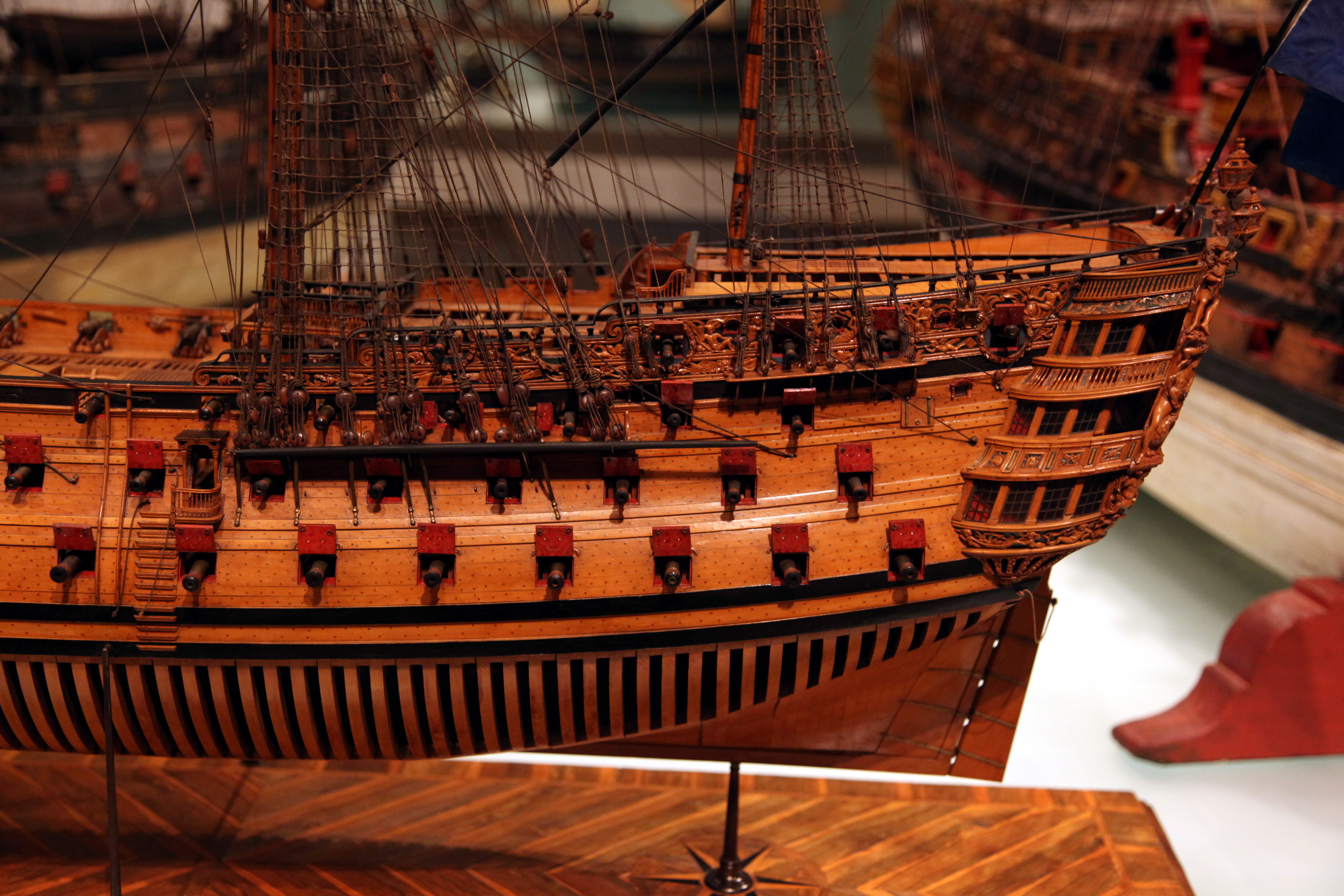
