= HMS Royal James (1671) =

Ship of the line of the Royal Navy

- The Burning of the Royal James at the Battle of Solebay, 7 June 1672 by Willem van de Velde the younger. De Ruyter's flagship De Zeven Provinciën is shown in the left background in close combat with the Vice-Admiral of the Blue, Sir Joseph Jordan on Royal Sovereign. The ship to the right of the burning Royal James is that of Vice-Admiral Johan de Liefde.

History

England
- Name: HMS Royal James
- Ordered: 22 April 1669
- Builder: Deane, Portsmouth Dockyard
- Launched: 31 March 1671
- Commissioned: 18 January 1672
- Fate: Burnt, 7 June 1672
- Notes: Participated in: Battle of Solebay

General characteristics
- Class & type: 100-gun first rate ship of the line
- Tons burthen: 1416 bm
- Length: 132 ft 6 in (40.39 m) (keel)
- Beam: 45 ft (14 m)
- Draught: 18 ft 5 in (5.61 m)
- Depth of hold: 19 ft 9 in (6.02 m)
- Propulsion: Sails
- Sail plan: Full-rigged ship
- Complement: 800 (wartime)
- Armament: 102 guns of various weights of shot

HMS Royal James was a 102-gun first rate ship of the line of the Royal Navy, built by Anthony Deane at Portsmouth Dockyard at a cost of £24,000, and launched on 31 March 1671.

She was the first Royal Navy vessel to be assembled using iron as a part of her frame, rather than merely in bolts and nails. Her shipwright, Sir Anthony Deane modified the vessel's plans to include U-shaped iron bars to secure the planking of the hull, despite stern disapproval from Admiralty's representative, the Clerk of the Acts Samuel Pepys. Deane defended his actions by claiming there was a shortage of usable wood. His defence was personally reviewed by the King, Charles II, who upheld the use of iron. However, the innovation was not repeated in other Royal Navy vessels until adoption of the 1719 Establishment nearly fifty years later.

Royal James was also one of only three Royal Navy ships to be equipped with the Rupertinoe naval gun. She fought at the Battle of Solebay on 7 June 1672 (28 May 1672 O.S.) as Admiral Edward Montagu's flagship. She was attacked by first Dolfijn, and then Groot Hollandia, before finally coming under attack by Dutch fireships. Royal James was destroyed by the fire and sank. Montagu died, although the ship's Captain, Richard Haddock, survived and went on to hold a distinguished career in the Navy. She had seen barely four months service.

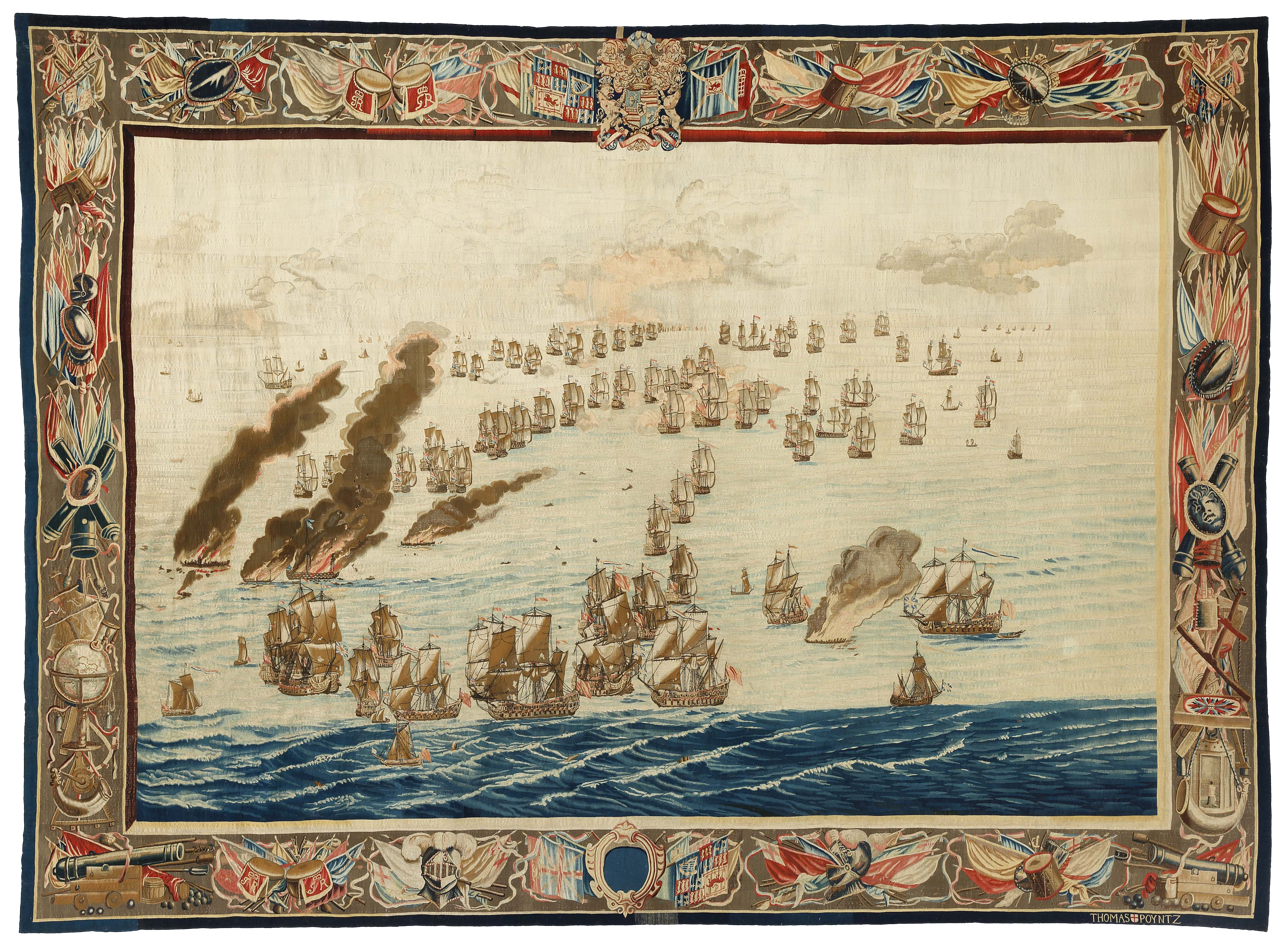
The Burning of the Royal James (Later in the Day), tapestry by Willem van de Velde the Elder
