= Battle of Lowestoft order of battle =

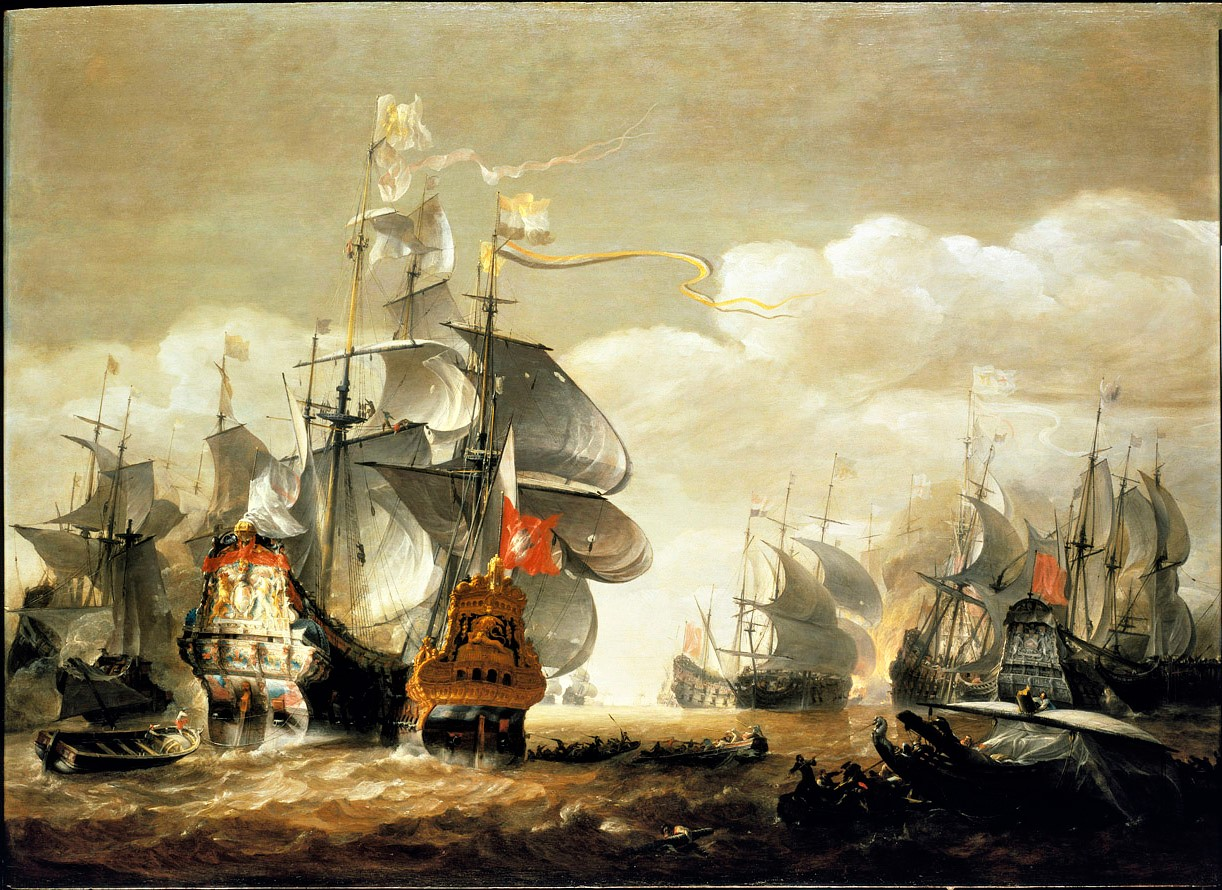
The Battle of Lowestoft, 13 June 1665, showing Royal Charles and the Eendracht by Hendrik van Minderhout, painted c. 1665

The ships that participated in the Battle of Lowestoft, a naval engagement between the English and Dutch off the English port of Lowestoft on 13 June (New Style) 1665 during the Second Anglo-Dutch War. 95 English ships (later rising to 100 when ships joined during the battle), commanded by James Stuart, Duke of York, faced 107 Dutch ships led by Jacob van Wassenaer, Baron Obdam. The battle ended in a victory for the English, capturing 9 Dutch ships and sinking 8 others, for the loss of only one ship (the Charity).

== British fleet ==
Although the fleet list dated 10 May (20 May N.S.) names 109 vessels of the 6th Rate and above, 19 had been detached for other duties before the battle, while 5 previously unlisted vessels had arrived. Thus there were 95 ships at the commencement of the battle. 5 of the detached vessels rejoined the fleet during the battle, bringing the total to exactly 100 ships. This total included 24 hired merchantmen (indicated as such in the 'Notes' column).

=== The White Squadron ===
The White (or Van) Squadron was under Prince Rupert - his flagship being the Royal James.

Ship	Guns	Commander	Notes
Van Division
Colchester	28	Captain Daniel Helling	
Triumph	70	Vice-Admiral Christopher Myngs	
Monck	54	Captain Thomas Penrose	
Newcastle	48	Captain Thomas Page	
Lion	52	Captain Edward Spragge	
Ruby	46	Captain William Jennens	
Expedition	30	Captain Tobias Sackler	
John and Abigail	40	Captain Joseph Sanders	Hired merchantman
Happy Return	40	Captain John Hubbard	Hired merchantman
Katherine	36	Captain Thomas Elliot	Hired merchantman
John and Katherine	36	Captain John Whately	Hired merchantman
Centre Division
Reserve	46	Captain John Tyrwhit	
Rainbow	56	Captain Willoughby Hannam	
Exchange	36	Captain Samuel Wentworth	Hired merchantman
Revenge	58	Captain Robert Holmes	
Royal James	78	Admiral Prince Rupert; Flag-captain John Kempthorne	
Garland	28	Captain Charles Talbot	
Hound	8	Captain James Coleman	Fireship
Dolphin	4	Captain William Gregory	Fireship
Assurance	32	Captain John Jeffries	
Mary Rose	48	Captain William Reeves	
Henrietta	58	Captain Walter Wood	
Bendish	42	Captain Robert Taylor	Hired merchantman
Portland	46	Captain John Aylett	
Rear Division
East India Merchant	44	Captain John Wilgresse	Hired merchantman
St. Andrew	60	Captain Valentine Pine	
Advice	40	Captain William Poole	
Bear	42	Captain John Waterworth	
Constant Katherine	40	Captain Francis Sanders	Hired merchantman
Kent	46	Captain Thomas Ewens	
Anne	58	Captain Arnold Brown	
Resolution	58	Rear-Admiral Robert Sansum	Sansum killed in the battle
Milford	28	Captain John Seale	
Small craft
Hind	8	Captain John Withers	Ketch
Sea Venture			
James			
Desire			
Little Sampson			
William & Mary			

=== The Red Squadron ===
The Red (or Centre) Squadron was under the Duke of York - his flagship being the Royal Charles.

Ship	Guns	Commander	Notes
Van Division
Bristol	48	Captain John Hart	
Gloucester	58	Captain Robert Clark	
Royal Exchange	46	Captain Giles Shelley	Hired merchantman
Diamond	46	Captain John King	
Martin Galley	14	Captain Richard White	
Royal Oak	100	Vice-Admiral Sir John Lawson	Lawson died of his wounds after the battle
Norwich	24	Captain John Wetwang	
Guinea	36	Captain John Abelson	Abelson killed in the battle
St. George	60	Captain Joseph Jordan	
Coast Frigate	34	Captain Thomas Lawson	Hired merchantman
Dover	46	Captain Jeffery Pearse	
King Ferdinando	36	Captain Francis Johnson	Hired merchantman
Centre Division
Plymouth	56	Captain Thomas Allin	
Fountain	30	Captain Jean Baptiste du Tiel	
Blackamore	38	Captain Richard Neales	Hired merchantman
Mary	58	Captain Jeremiah Smith	
Happy Return	50	Captain James Lambert	
Royal Charles	80	James, Duke of York; Sir William Penn; Flag-captain John Harman	
Mermaid	28	Captain Jasper Grant	
Fame	12	Captain John Gethings	Fireship
Bramble	8	Captain Nepthali Ball	Fireship
Antelope	46	Captain John Chicheley	
Old James	68	Captain James Ley, 3rd Earl of Marlborough	Marlborough killed in the battle
Loyal George	42	Captain John Earle	Hired merchantman
Yarmouth	52	Captain Thomas Ayliffe	
Vanguard	56	Captain Jonas Poole	
Convertine	48	Captain John Pearce	
Charity	46	Captain Robert Wilkinson	Sunk by Dutch fireship
Rear Division
Eagle	44	Captain Thomas Hendra	Hired merchantman
Amity	36	Captain John Parker	
Satisfaction	46	Captain Richard May	Hired merchantman
Fairfax	58	Captain Robert Salmon	
Swiftsure	60	Rear-Admiral Sir William Berkeley	
Bonaventure	40	Captain Arthur Laughorne	
Portsmouth	38	Captain Robert Mohun	
George	40	Captain Robert Hatubb	Hired merchantman
Leopard	54	Captain Richard Beach	
Sapphire	38	Captain Henry Hyde	
Loyal Merchant	44	Captain Robert Sanders	Hired merchantman
Small craft
Roe	8	Captain James Lock	Ketch
Eaglet	8	Captain William Berry	Ketch
St. George			
Bachelor			
Isabella			
Hopeful Margaret			
Seaflower			
Edward & Eve			

=== The Blue Squadron ===
The Blue (or Rear) Squadron was under Earl of Sandwich - his flagship being the Royal Prince.

Ship	Guns	Commander	Notes
Van Division
Forester	28	Captain Edward Cotterell	
Royal Katherine	70	Rear-Admiral Thomas Teddeman	
Essex	52	Captain Richard Utber	
Marmaduke	38	Captain John Best	
Princess	52	Captain George Swanley	
Golden Phoenix	36	Captain Samuel Dickinson	Hired merchantman
Adventure	36	Captain Benjamin Young	
Society	36	Captain Ralph Lascelles	Hired merchantman
Dreadnought	58	Captain Henry Terne	
Prudent Mary	36	Captain Thomas Haward	Hired merchantman
Centre Division
Dragon	38	Captain John Lloyd	
Centurion	46	Captain Robert Moulton, Jr.	
Montagu	58	Captain Henry Fenne	
Oxford	24	Captain Philemon Bacon	
Prince Royal	86	Edward Montagu, 1st Earl of Sandwich; Flag-captain Roger Cuttance	
Pembroke	28	Captain Thomas Darcy	
Bryar	12	Captain Richard Cotton	Fireship
Dunkirk	54	Captain John Hayward	
Breda	46	Captain Robert Kirby	Kirby killed in the battle
John & Thomas	44	Captain Henry Dawes	Hired merchantman
Swallow	46	Captain Richard Hodges	
Madras	42	Captain John Norbrook	Hired merchantman
Rear Division
Jersey	48	Captain Hugh Hide	
Hambro' Merchant	36	Captain James Cadman	Hired merchantman
Hampshire	40	Captain George Batts	
Castle frigate	36	Captain Philip Euatt	Hired merchantman
Assistance	40	Captain Zachary Brown	
Unicorn	56	Captain Henry Teddiman	
Providence	30	Captain Richard James	
York	58	Captain John Swanley	
Henry	70	Vice-Admiral Sir George Ayscue	
Guernsey	28	Captain Humphrey Connisby	
Small craft
Nonsuch	8	Captain Robert Crossman	Ketch
Thomas & Rebecca			
Hopewell			
John			Smack
John			Hoy
Two Sisters			

Of the ships which had been on the 10 May fleet list but had been detached (excluding the five which rejoined during the battle), the merchantman Good Hope had been captured by the Dutch on 20 May, the Merlin was in the Thames, the Coventry and Lizard were at Portsmouth, the Little Mary at Plymouth, the Paradox at Scilly, the merchantman Maryland was in Harwich ("defective"), the Success in Lowestoft, the Speedwell at Newcastle, the Little Gift in Ireland and the Truelove in the Downs. Three more were engaged in scouting - the Paul, Hector and Blackamoor (a pink). None of these was larger than 5th Rate.

== Dutch fleet ==
The Dutch fleet comprised 107 ships carrying 4,864 guns and 21,613 men. Of these 107 ships, 81 were ships of the line from the five Dutch Admiralties, while 11 were hired merchantmen from the Dutch East India Company (Vereenigde Oostinische Compagnie), indicated by "VOC" in the lists below. There were also 9 frigates and 6 three-mast yachts. The Admiralty to which a ship belonged as indicated by a letter in parentheses preceding the name:

- (A) Amsterdam Admiralty
- (F) Friesland Admiralty
- (M) Maas (or Rotterdam) Admiralty
- (N) Noorderkwartier Admiralty
- (Z) Zeeland Admiralty

No attempt can be made to indicate order of battle as the Dutch had not adopted the line-ahead system at this date, but the ships are indicated by squadron, within each of which the order of precedence is given, with the ships of the admiral, vice-admiral and rear-admiral listed first.

=== Squadron Command ships ===
Squadron	Squadron Commander	Flagship	Guns	Ref
1st (Amsterdam)	Lieutenant-Admiral Jacob van Wassenaer Obdam	Eendracht	72	
2nd (Zeeland)	Lieutenant-Admiral Johan Evertsen	Hof van Zeeland	58	
3rd (Maas)	Lieutenant-Admiral Egbert Bartholomeusz Kortenaer	Groot Hollandia	68	
4th (Friesland)	Lieutenant-Admiral Auke Stellingwerf	Zevenwolden	58	
5th (Amsterdam)	Vice-Admiral Cornelis Tromp	Liefde	70	
6th (Zeeland)	Vice-Admiral Cornelis Evertsen the Elder	Vlissingen	46	
7th (Noorderkwartier)	Vice-Admiral Volckert Schram	Wapen van Nassau	60	

=== The 1st (Amsterdam) Squadron ===
Ship	Guns	Commander	Notes
(M) Eendracht	72	Jacob van Wassenaer, Baron Obdam	Sunk by magazine explosion
(A) Amsterdam	54	Vice-Adm Abraham van der Hulst	
(A) Huis Tijdverdrijf	58	SbN (Rear-Adm) Albert Klaaszoon Graeff	
(A) Huis te Kruiningen	58	Jacob Andrieszoon Swart	
(A) Vrijheid	50	Jan van Amstel	
(A) Landman	44	Hugo van Nieuwenhof	
(A) Vrede	40	Hendrik Gotskens	
(A) Stad Gouda	48	Otto van Treslong	
(A) Dom van Utrecht	48	Jacob Willemszoon Broeder	
(A) Harderwijk	46	Jacob Wiltschut	
(A) Haarlem	46	Adam van Brederode	
(A) Zeelandia	34	Balthazar van de Voorde	
(A) Gouden Ster	36	Herman Egbertszoon Wolff	
(A) Brack	18	Gerrit Polanen	
VOC Maarseveen	78	Jan Jacobszoon de Reus	Burnt by fireship

=== The 2nd (Zeeland) Squadron ===
Ship	Guns	Captain	Notes
(Z) Hof van Zeeland	58	Johan Evertsen	
(M) Klein Hollandia	54	SbN (Rear-Admiral) Johan de Liefde	
(Z) Utrecht	50	Cornelis Evertsen the Younger	Burnt
(Z) Middleburg	46	Jacon Adriaanszoon Pens	
(Z) Wapen van Zeeland	36	Bastiaan Tuyneman	
(Z) Delft	34	Jan Banckert	Captured by HMS Leopard & Breda
(Z) Zeelandia	34	Simon Blok	Captured by HMS Centurion
(Z) Schakerloo	29	Jan Krijnssen	
(M) Prins Maurits	53	Marinus de Clercq	
(M) Dordrecht	46	Jacob Cleydyck	
(M) Wapen van Utrecht	36	Christiaan Eldertsen	
(M) Delft	36	Jacob van Boshuisen	
(M) Schiedam	25	Adriaan Solderwagen	
VOC Oranje	76	Bastiaan Senten	Sunk
(M) Lapende Hert (yacht)	8	Pieter Wijnbergen	
(Z) Dieshouk (yacht)	6	Jan Pieterszoon Tant	

=== The 3rd (Maas) Squadron ===
Ship	Guns	Captain	Notes
(M) Groot Hollandia	68	Laurens Davidszoon van Convert	
(A) Oosterwijk	68	Vice-Adm Dirck Schey	
(A) Stavoren	48	Vice-Adm Nicolaas Marrevelt	
(A) Hilversum	58	Albert Mathijszoon	Captured by HMS Bristol
(A) Zuiderhuis	50	Joost Verschuur	
(A) Doesburg	48	Ysbrandt de Vries	
(A) Vereenigte Provincien	48	Cornelis van Hogenhoeck	
(A) Duivenvoorde	48	Hendrik van Tholl	
(A) Wakende Boei	48	Anthony de Martre	
(A) Ter Goes	46	Gebrant Boes	Sunk by fireship
(A) Harderin	38	Lieuwe van Hasevelt	
(A) Maagd van Enkhuizen	38	Johannes van der Mars	
(A) Overijssel	36	Jan van Blankenburch	
VOC Delfland	70	Jeuriaan Jeuriaanse Pod	
VOC Sphera Mundi	41	Apolonia Poel	

=== The 4th (Friesland) Squadron ===
Ship	Guns	Captain	Notes
(F) Zevenwolden	58	Lieut-Adm Auke Stellingwerf	
(F) Groningen	40	Vice-Admiraal Rudolf Coenders	
(F) Prinses Albertina	52	SbN (Rear-Adm) Hendrik Dirkszoon Bruynsveld	
(F) Oostergo	68	Allart Piersen de Boer	
(F) Elf Steden	54	Tjerk Hiddes de Vries	
(F) Westergo	52	Jan Janszoon Vijselaar	
(F) Omlandia	44	Cornelis Allartszoon Oostrum	
(F) Klein Frisia	40	Wytse Beyma	
(F) Postillon van Smirna	40	Barend Hiddes de Vries	
(F) Hollandia	40	Joost Michielszoon	
(A) Phesant	38	Jacob Pieteys	
(A) Ijlst	36	Willem Codde van der Burgh	
VOC Huis te Zwieten	70	Cornelis Crijnssen de Rechter	
VOC Mars	50	Heyn Klaaszoon Kat	Captured by HMS Assurance
VOC Ruijter	18	Jan de Vogel	Captured

=== The 5th (Amsterdam) Squadron ===
Ship	Guns	Captain	Notes
(A) Liefde	70	Vice-Adm Cornelis Tromp	
(A) Koevorden	56	Gilles Thijssen Campen	
(A) Kampen	48	Pieter Salomonszoon	
(A) Luijpaard	58	Kommer Gerritszoon	
(A) Stad en Lande	56	Jan de Haan	
(A) Tromp	48	Adriaan van Rheede	
(A) Huis te Jaarsveld	48	Thomas Fabritius	
(A) Raadhuis van Haarlem	48	Jan Adelaar	
(A) Groningen	48	Pieter Janszoon Uyttenhout	
(A) Zon	48	Hendrik van Vollenhoven	
(A) Wapen van Edam	38	Cornelis Gerritszoon Burger	Captured
(A) Schager Roos	38	Joosten Smient	
(A) Asperen	36	Adriaan van Veen	
(A) Vollenhoven	30	Hendrik Haeckroy	
(A) Fortuin	14	Laurens Bruyn	
(N) Prinses Roijaal	40	Adriaan Teding van Berkhout	
VOC Nieuw Batavia	50	Jan Pieterszoon Onclaer	

=== The 6th (Zeeland) Squadron ===
Ship	Guns	Captain	Notes
(Z) Vlissingen	46	Vice-Adm Cornelis Evertsen	
(Z) Kampveere	46	SbN (Rear-Adm) Adriaan Banckert	
(N) Drie Helden Davids	50	Pieter Bronsaart	
(Z) Dordrecht	46	Adriaan de Haaze	
(Z) Zeeridder	34	Jan Willem Marinissen	
(Z) Goes	30	Adriaan van Cruiningen	
(Z) Zwanenburg	30	Cornelis Kuiper	Burnt by fireship
(Z) Visschers Harder	26	Jan Adriaanszoon Blankert	
(Z) Westcappel	24	Marinus Loncke	
(Z) Visscher	16	Simon Loncke	
(M) Stad Utrecht	48	Jacob Oudart	
(M) Rotterdam	45	Cryn Cerckhoven	
(M) Vrede	40	Laurens van Heemskerck	
(M) Gorinchem	36	Jacob van der Cam	
(M) Briel	21	Frans van Nijdek	
(M) Swol	20	Jacob Simonszoon de Witt	
(Z) Zouteland (yacht)	4	Willem Hendrikszoon van der Veere	
(M) Hazewinthont (yacht)	3	Andries Pietersen	

=== The 7th (Noorderkwartier) Squadron ===
Ship	Guns	Captain	Notes
(N) Wapen van Nassau	60	Dirk Gerritszoon Pomp	
(N) Eendracht	44	SbN (Rear-Adm) Frederick Stachouwer	
(N) Wapen van Medemblik	46	Adriaan Houttuin	
(N) Gelderland	56	Cornelis Jaconszoon de Boer	
(N) Hollandse Tuin	56	Beberen	
(N) Jozua	50	Cornelis Slordt	
(N) Westfriesland	50	Jacob Bruynings	
(N) Jupiter	44	Huysman	
(N) Jonge Prins	36	Jan Halfhoorn	Captured by HMS Martin Galley
(N) Eenhoorn	30	Cornelis Victol	
(N) Hoorn	30	Klaas Valchen	
VOC Carolus Quintus	54	Joris Kuiten	Captured by HMS Plymouth
VOC Nagelboom	52	Boon	Captured by HMS Colchester
VOC Beurs van Amsterdam	52	Cornelis Muts	
VOC Agatha	32	Gerrit Klaaszoon Posthoorn	

=== Other Dutch ships ===
Four ships were left behind in the Texel when the fleet sailed on 23/24 May, due to shortage of men. These were the Amsterdam Admiralty's Zuiphen (36), Groot Harder (38), Leiden (36) and Kat (21).
