= James Peacock (naval officer) =

English naval officer

Vice-Admiral James Peacock
- Died: 1653
- Military career
- Allegiance: Commonwealth of England
- Branch: Parliamentary Navy; Commonwealth Navy
- Service years: 1647–1653
- Rank: Vice-Admiral of the Red
- Conflicts: English Civil War; Siege of Colchester; First Anglo-Dutch War; Battle of Portland; Battle of Scheveningen (DOW)

Vice-Admiral James Peacock (died 1653) was an English naval officer: first in the Parliamentary Navy during the English Civil War, afterwards in the Commonwealth Navy during the First Anglo-Dutch War.

== Life ==
=== English Civil War ===
James Peacock appears to have been a merchant and sea captain, whose native place was Ipswich. He is first mentioned as captain of the Constant Warwick frigate for the Parliament, and commanding a squadron of ships-of-war in the North Sea in the summer of 1647. In December he was moved into the Tiger, and continued on the same service till December 1649. During this time he made several prizes, apparently Royalist privateers hailing from Jersey or from Ireland; convoyed the trade from Elsinore, and was repeatedly warned to station vessels near the Orkney Islands, to surprise Irish pirates, or on the coast of Norfolk, from Cromer to Lynn, to look out for 'pickaroons', 'pilfering sea-rovers'. In June 1648 he assisted in the Siege of Colchester by blockading the river. In September 1649 he was looking out for a ship from Amsterdam laden with arms for the Duke of Montrose. In 1650 the Tiger was one of a squadron sent to the Mediterranean under Vice-admiral Edward Hall in charge of convoy and for the security of trade against pirates and the Royalist privateers, and also with letters of reprisal against the French.

In January 1650–1 Peacock was awarded a gold chain and medal of the value of 50l. for services at sea; at the same time 50l. was ordered to be paid in gratuities to the officers and men of the Tiger. In October 1651 the Tiger arrived in the Thames, and was ordered to be paid off. The order was apparently annulled, for in January 1651–2, still commanded by Peacock, she was sent to Leith with 80,000l. for the army. Afterwards she seems to have captured sundry small pirate vessels, the men of which were lodged in Ipswich gaol.

=== First Anglo-Dutch War ===
On 23 May 1652, on the news of the action off Folkestone on the 19th, (Note: see Robert Blake) the Tiger, then in the Thames, was ordered to the Downs. Shortly afterwards she was cruising in the North Sea, and, in company with another frigate, engaged two Dutch men-of-war. On 10 June the Council of State wrote to the generals to signify to Peacock 'their acceptance' of his 'worthy deportment'. On 18 October Peacock reported his arrival at Yarmouth with twenty prizes. A month later he was appointed to command a squadron going to the Mediterranean to reinforce Richard Badiley, but the defeat of Blake on 30 November prevented his sailing. On 4 December he was ordered to go to the Downs with any ships-of-war ready in the river; on the 7th he was told that he should have a better ship; shortly afterwards he was moved into the Rainbow, and in the following February was appointed Vice-admiral of the White Squadron, in which capacity he took part in the great Battle of Portland on 18 February, and in the pursuit of the Dutch fleet as far as Gris-Nez. In March Peacock was moved again to the Triumph, and in the action of 2–3 June 1653 was Vice-admiral of the Red Squadron, as also in the concluding action of the war, 29–31 July, when he was mortally wounded.

Peacock died a few days later. He left a widow, Mary, and five children, to whom Parliament voted a gratuity of 750l., vested in trustees belonging to Ipswich, where they desired that the money might be paid.
