= William Jennens (Royal Navy officer) =

British Royal Navy captain (1634–1704)

Captain Sir William Jennens
- Born: 27 June 1634
- Died: 1704 (aged 69–70); Lisbon
- Other names: Jennyns, Jennings
- Spouse: Diana Steward
- Children: 3
- Relatives: Sarah Churchill, Duchess of Marlborough (niece)
- Military career
- Allegiance: Kingdom of England
- Branch: Royal Navy
- Service years: 1660–1671; 1672–1689
- Rank: Captain
- Commands: HMS Ruby; HMS Lion; HMS Sapphire; HMS Princess; HMS Victory; HMS Gloucester; HMS French Ruby; HMS Royal James; HMS Jersey; HMS Rupert; HMS Warspite
- Conflicts: Second Anglo-Dutch War; Battle of Lowestoft; Four Days' Battle (WIA); St. James's Day Battle; Holmes's Bonfire; Raid on the Medway; Third Anglo-Dutch War; Battle of Texel (WIA); Nine Years' War; Glorious Revolution
- Awards: Knight Bachelor
- Other work: Chief Engineer to Peter II of Portugal

Sir William Jennens (c. 27 June 1634 – 1704) was a British Royal Navy captain and Jacobite.

== Biography ==
Jennens is said by Charnock to have belonged to "a very respectable family in the county of Hertford," a statement probably due to some confusion with Sir John Jennings, who does not appear to have been a relation. Le Neve, who may have had a personal reason, has noted him, though doubtfully, as a younger brother of Sir Robert Jennings of Ripon. It has been pointed out that neither Sir Robert nor Sir William are recognized in Dugdale's Visitation of Yorkshire in 1665. All that is certain is that he, himself wrote his name 'Jennens'. In 1661, he was appointed second lieutenant of the Adventure. In 1664, he was successively lieutenant of the Gloucester and the Portland; on 11 October he was promoted to be captain of the Ruby. The Ruby was one of the white squadron in the battle of 3 June 1665, some time after which he received the honour of knighthood. That the date is not given by Le Neve would seem to imply that he stood on naval privilege, and refused to pay the fees. He still commanded the Ruby in the four-days' fight of 1–4 June 1666, after which he was moved into the Lion, and in her took part in the action of 25 July.

At the burning of the Dutch shipping at the Vlie on 8 August, he commanded in the second post under Sir Robert Holmes. Jennens, afterwards, was appointed to the Sapphire, and in the disastrous summer of 1667, had charge of a division of the small vessels together for the defence of the Thames. Pepys implies that he was a man of dissolute and profane life, and speaks of him as "a proud, idle fellow," whom he suspected of malpractices. He states a complaint he brought against his lieutenant, Le Neve, "was a drunken quarrel, where one was as blamable as the other." In 1670, Jennens commanded the Princess, in which he conducted a convoy to the Mediterranean, and on his return was imprisoned in the Marshalsea, "only", as he wrote, "for having his wife on board some part of the late voyage, which was no prejudice to the service." The Duke of York would seem to have condoned the offence, and in 1673, Jennens commanded the Victory in the several engagements between Prince Rupert and De Ruyter. He was afterwards captain successively of the Gloucester, the French Ruby, and the Royal James guard ship at Portsmouth. In July 1686, he was appointed to the Jersey, also a guard ship, at Portsmouth; and on 20 February 1687–88 he was tried by court-martial for brawling on shore with Captain Skelton of the Constant Warwick, another guard ship. They were each reprimanded and fined nine months' pay (Minutes of the Court-martial). On 5 September 1688, he was, notwithstanding, appointed to the Rupert, which was still fitting out in October, but was probably one of the fleet with Lord Dartmouth in November.

When James II abdicated, Jennens went to France, and entered the French navy. He served in some capacity in the Battle of Beachy Head, 30 June 1690. Charnock says "he condescended to become third captain to a French admiral;" and an intercepted letter to another traitor speaks of him as "one of their admirals" The French lists do not acknowledge him in either capacity, and it is more probable that he was serving as a volunteer and pilot on Tourville's staff. Nothing more is known of him.
