= HMS Royal Oak (1664) =

Ship of the line of the Royal Navy

History

England
- Name: HMS Royal Oak
- Namesake: Royal Oak
- Builder: Tippetts, Portsmouth Dockyard
- Launched: 1664
- Fate: Burnt by Dutch during the Medway raid, 1667

General characteristics
- Class & type: 100-gun first rate ship of the line
- Tons burthen: 102121/94 (bm)
- Length: 121 ft (37 m) (keel)
- Beam: 39 ft 10 in (12.14 m)
- Depth of hold: 17 ft 1 1/2 in (5.2 m)
- Propulsion: Sails
- Sail plan: Full-rigged ship
- Armament: Gundeck: 28 32 pounder cannon; Middle Gundeck: 28 24 pounder guns; Upper Gundeck: 28 12 pounder guns; Quarter deck: 12 4 pounder guns; Fo'castle: 4 6 pounder guns

HMS Royal Oak was a 100-gun first rate ship of the line of the Royal Navy, launched in 1664 at Portsmouth Dockyard. Royal Oak was built by John Tippetts, Master-Shipwright at Portsmouth 1660-8, who later became Navy Commissioner and subsequently Surveyor of the Navy (Knighted 1672).

Historian Brian Lavery quotes an entry in the "Calendar of State Papers, Domestic" series (CSPD; the records of the English, and later, the British, governmental proceedings, dating back to the reign of Henry VIII; also known as the "British State Papers", and now held by the National Archives) from 9/3/1665 that reports: the King (i.e., Charles II) "...is very much pleased with the new frigate built at Portsmouth, the Royal Oak, and has ordered Tippetts, the shipwright who built her, to build just such another, and not to mend her in any part, being assured that anything which is not just so cannot be so good..."

The career of Royal Oak in the Royal Navy was brief, but highly eventful. According to John Charnock's Bibliographia Navalis, Admiral Sir Christopher Myngs was her captain in 1664. The ship fought in most of the major battles of the Second Anglo-Dutch War: Lowestoft, the Four Days' Battle, and the St. James' Day Fight. At the Battle of Lowestoft in 1665, under the command of Vice-Admiral Sir John Lawson, Royal Oak was the flagship of the Van Division of the Duke of York's Red Squadron; Sir John later died of the wounds he received in the battle. After the defeat administered to the Dutch Navy in the 1666 battle on St. James' Day, the English made the mistake of deciding to save money and leave the fleet in ordinary during the ensuing fighting season, a decision ultimately resulting in Royal Oak being burnt by the Dutch during their Raid on the Medway in 1667.

== See also ==
- Royal Oak, Frindsbury – a pub possibly named after the ship, rumoured to contain a beam from the ship.
