= English ship St George (1622) =

Ship of the line of the Royal Navy

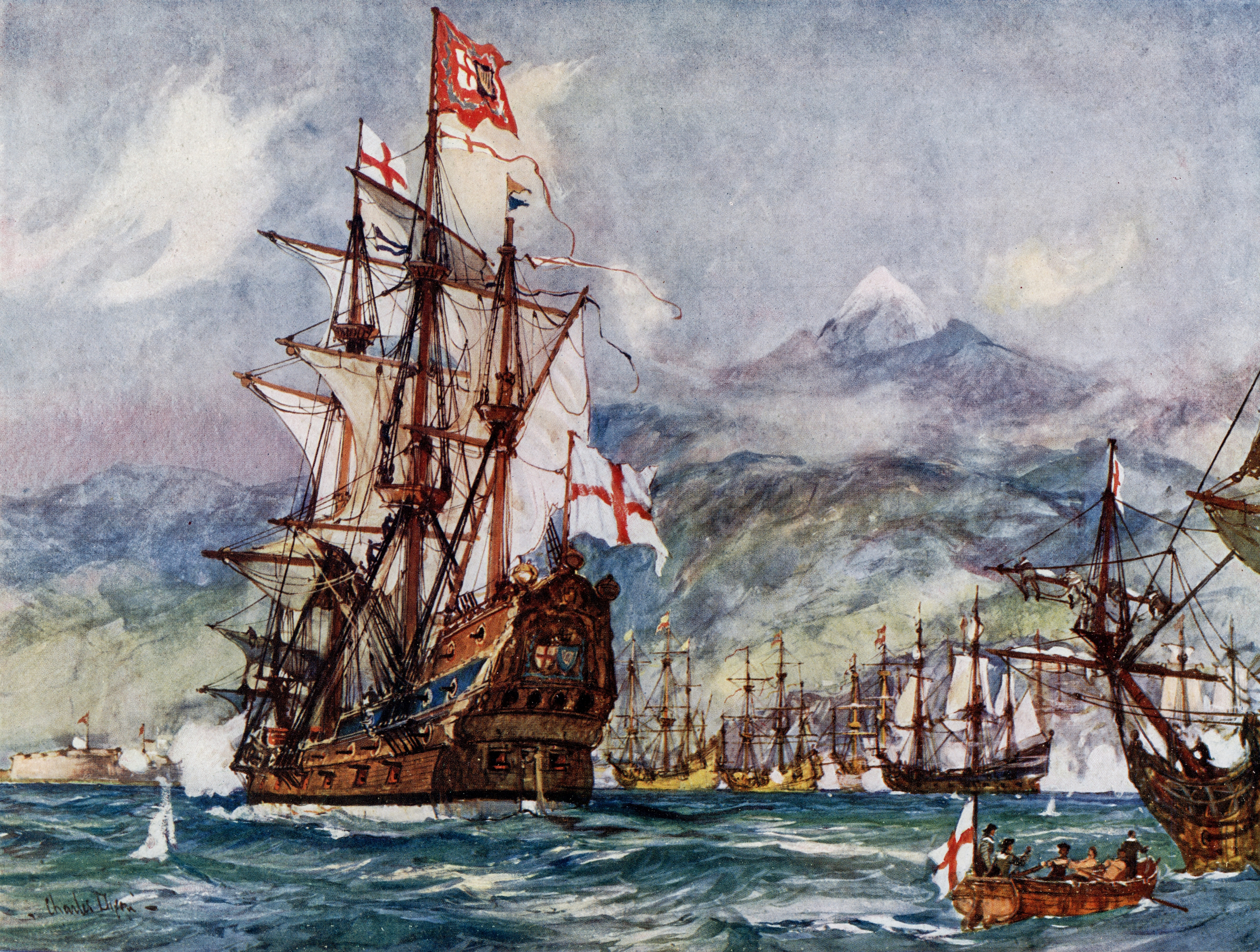
- The George at the Battle of Santa Cruz de Tenerife (1657)

History

England
- Name: St George
- Ordered: February 1622
- Builder: William Burrell, Deptford Dockyard
- Launched: 1622
- Renamed: George, 1649; HMS St. George, 1660
- Honours and awards: 1625 Attack on Cadiz; 14 September 1650 Capture of the Brazil Fleet; 2 June 1653 Battle of the Gabbard; 31 July 1653 Battle of Scheveningen; 4 April 1655 Battle of Porto Farina; 20 April 1657 Battle of Santa Cruz de Tenerife; 3 June 1665 Battle of Lowestoft; 1-4 June 1666 Four Days Battle; 25 July 1666 St James Day Battle; 28 May 1672 Battle of Solebay; 28 May 1673 First Battle of Schooneveld; 4 June 1673 Second Battle of Schooneveld; 11 August 1673 Battle of Texel
- Fate: Sunk as a blockship at Sheerness, 1697

General characteristics
- Class & type: 42-gun Great ship or Second rate
- Tons burthen: 792 tons bm originally; 9341/2 bm finally
- Length: 110 ft (34 m) (keel) originally; 117 ft (36 m) (keel) finally
- Beam: 37 ft 3 in (11.35 m) originally; 38 ft 9 in (11.81 m) (keel) finally
- Depth of hold: 14 ft 6 in (4.42 m) originally; 15 ft 9 in (4.80 m) (keel) finally
- Propulsion: Sails
- Sail plan: Full-rigged ship

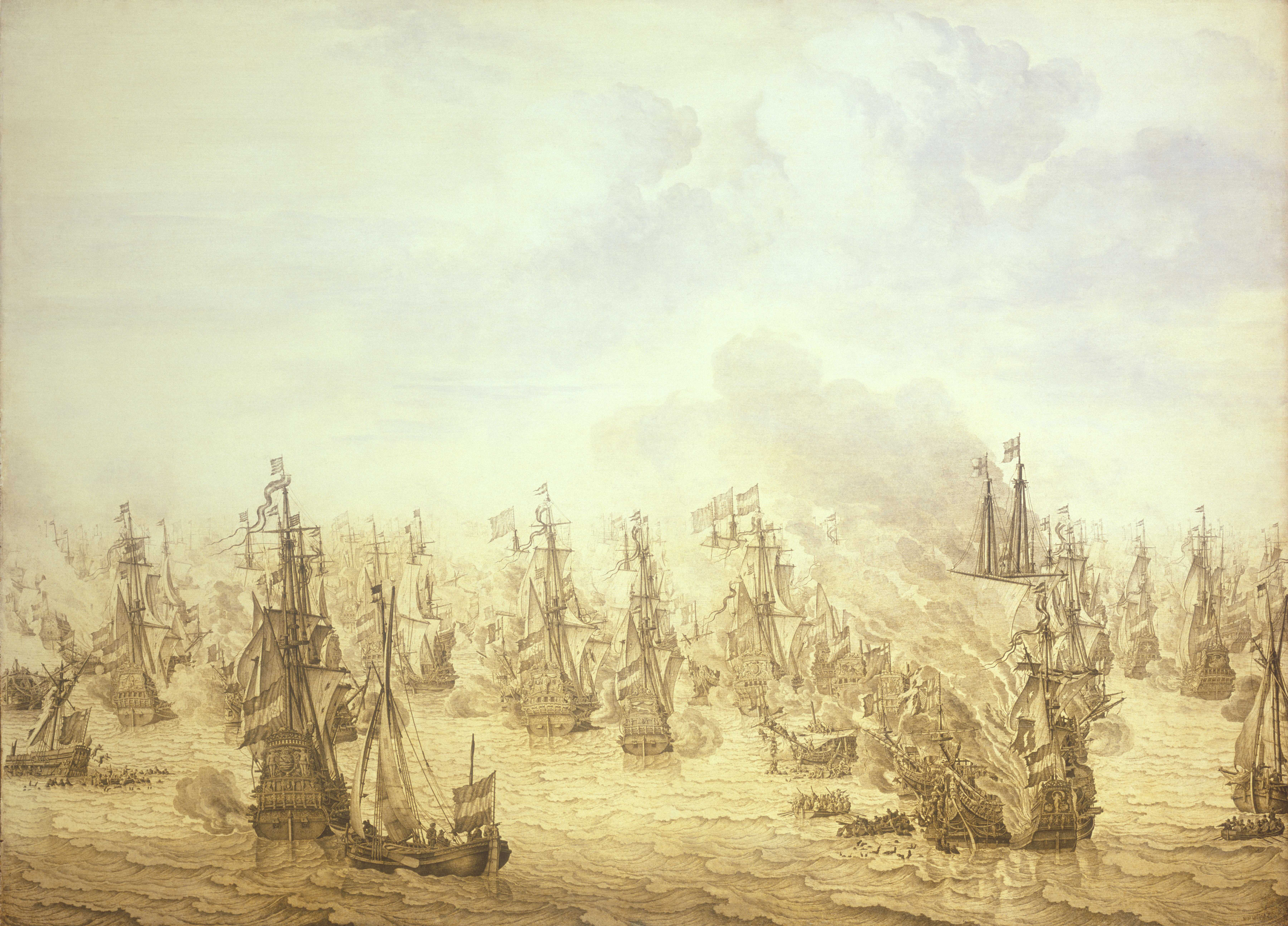
The George at the Battle of Scheveningen, 31 July (Julian calendar) /10 August (New Style) 1653

St George, renamed as George from 1649 to 1660 during the Commonwealth of England, was a 42-gun great ship or Second rate of the navy of the Kingdom of England, designed and built by William Burrell (Master Shipwright of the East India Company) at Deptford Dockyard and launched in 1622. By 1660 her armament had been increased to 56 guns. It finally increased to 60 guns.

== Design and modifications ==
The St George was the fifth of the six "Great Ships" (or Second rates) to be designed and built at Deptford Dockyard for James I's navy by Burrell (as well as three Third rates and a Fourth rate). The other Second Rates were the Constant Reformation, Victory, Swiftsure, Saint Andrew and Triumph. The first three ships were designed with a keel length of 103 ft and a beam of 34 ft, but in the second trio the design was enlarged to 110 ft keel length by 36 ft 6 in, and following battle damage during the First Anglo-Dutch War the keel was extended by some 6 or 7 ft (the overall length remaining unchanged as the rake of the stem and stern was reduced) and the breadth was increased to 38 or 38.5 ft. Her burthen tonnage increased to 92481/94 bm (nominally to 921 tons).

Like Burrell's five other Second rates, the St George was built as a two-decked ship with 42 guns, but during Charles I's reign a spar deck was added over the upper deck, and later this was hardened to support a third gundeck. She had no forecastle above this third deck. By 1652 she carried 60 guns, raised to 64 by 1660 and 72 in 1666 (comprising 20 demi-cannon, 26 culverins, 24 demi-culverins and 2 sakers). Her original complement of 300 men rose to 380 in 1666 and eventually to 460 in wartime.

== Career and Fate ==
In 1625 the St George was the flagship of Vice-Admiral Henry Power for the attack on Cadiz. She became part of the Navy of the Commonwealth of England in 1649, with her name shortened to George. During the First Anglo-Dutch War she took part in all the major naval battles - the Battle of Dover (1652), the Battle of Kentish Knock (1652), the Battle of Dungeness (1652), the Battle of Portland (1653), the Battle of the Gabbard (1653) and the Battle of Scheveningen (1653). She was as the flagship of Robert Blake during the Anglo-Spanish War, when she took part in the Battle of Santa Cruz de Tenerife (1657), and he died aboard her on his journey back to England. At the Stuart Restoration in 1660, the George was transferred into the new Royal Navy, becoming HMS St George. During the Second Anglo-Dutch War she participated in the Battle of Lowestoft in 1665, the Four Days' Battle in 1666 and the St James' Day Fight in 1666. During the Third Anglo-Dutch War she took part in the Battle of Solebay in 1672, and in the two Battles of Schooneveld and the Battle of Texel in 1673. The St George was hulked in October 1687, and sunk as a blockship at Sheerness on 20 October 1697.

== Bibliography ==
- Dixon, William Hepworth (1852). Robert Blake, admiral and general at sea. London: Chapman and Hall.
- Lavery, Brian (1983) The Ship of the Line – Volume 1: The development of the battlefleet 1650-1850. Conway Maritime Press. ISBN 0-85177-252-8.
- Winfield, Rif (2009) British Warships in the Age of Sail 1603-1714: Design, Construction, Careers and Fates. Seaforth Publishing. ISBN 978-1-84832-040-6.
- Powell, John Rowland (1972). Robert Blake; general-at-sea. New York: Crane, Russak. ISBN 978-0-00211-7265.
- Three Decks <https://threedecks.org/index.php?display_type=show_ship&id=57>
