= Edward Spragge =

Royal Navy officer

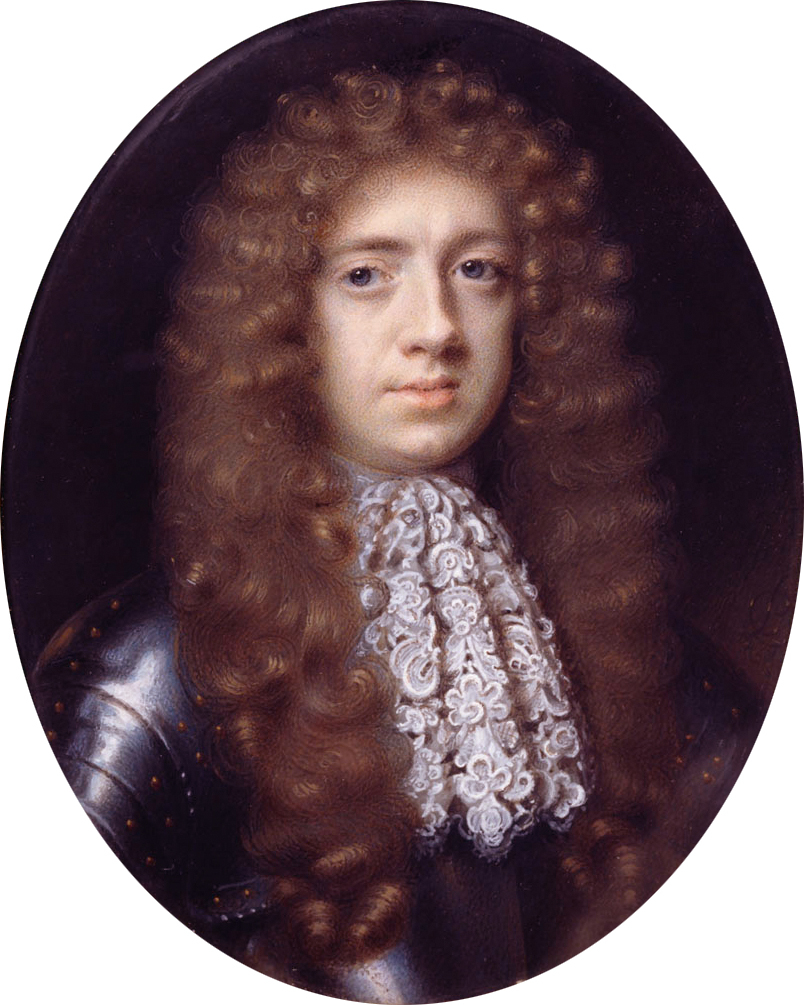
Edward Spragge (Peter Cross, ca. 1665)

Sir Edward Spragge (c. 1620 – 21 August 1673) was a Royal Navy officer. He was a fiery, brilliantly accomplished seaman who fought in many great actions after the Stuart Restoration of King Charles II of England in 1660.

== Life ==
Spragge was son of Lichfield Spragge of Roscommon, Ireland, by his wife Mary Legge (sister of William Legge), and grandson of John Spragge, who came to Ireland in the Elizabethan period. His father was killed in about 1645 during the Civil War when Royalist Governor of Roscommon.

Edward Spragge is said to have been a slave in Algiers before serving in the English Civil War from 1648 in Prince Rupert's royalist naval squadron. He remained loyal to the Stuarts after the war. When the royalist fleet had been dispersed in 1651, he began to work for the Dutch as a privateer in the First Anglo-Dutch War, which explains why some of his later colleagues had mixed feelings about him. He was very popular with the common sailors though because of his ebullient character; as Samuel Pepys put it, "he was a merry man, singing a pleasant song pleasantly". After 1653, he became a pirate associating himself with the Flemish Collaert family, a group of Dunkirkers that after the French conquest of Dunkirk in 1646, had likewise been forced to seek employment elsewhere. Spragge married Clara, daughter of the famous privateer Jacob Collaert, the Governor of Dunkirk. He often clashed with Commonwealth vessels when employed by the Spanish as a privateer in the Anglo-Spanish War (1654).

After the English Restoration, Charles II pardoned Spragge and rewarded his loyalty by making him captain of HMS Drake. Whenever Charles had need to send an envoy to the Spanish Netherlands, he often employed Spragge because of his good contacts there.

His first sea-fight with the Dutch was the Battle of Lowestoft in 1665, after which he was knighted on board of HMS Royal Charles for his gallant conduct as captain of the Lion (52), under Prince Rupert of the Rhine, who greatly favoured his career. Spragge was then given command of the Triumph (72).

The next year he was rear-admiral of the Green Squadron, on the Dreadnought (58), under Prince Rupert and fought only in the fourth day of the Four Days Battle. He was vice-admiral of the Blue Squadron, subcommander of the rear, on the Victory (82), under Jeremiah Smith in the St. James's Day Battle. Although an overall English victory, the English rear was defeated and routed by Lieutenant-Admiral Cornelis Tromp. Spragge felt so humiliated by this course of events – also because he was publicly denounced as a coward for his conduct by his enemy Robert Holmes – that he became a personal enemy of Tromp, vowing to kill him. His attitude was also influenced by the rumour that Tromp had remarked that Spragge had in future better let his wife command his squadron, who no doubt were well qualified for it, given her background.

But Tromp was fired from the Dutch navy in August 1666. After the disaster of the Raid on the Medway, where Spragge was present, but unable to organize efficient resistance against the Dutch raiders, England had to conclude peace with the United Provinces and the Second Anglo-Dutch War came to an end. Spragge was thus satirized by Andrew Marvell for his failure to defend Sheerness fort:

Spragge there, though practised in the sea command,
With panting heart lay like a fish on land
And quickly judged the fort was not tenáble--
Which, if a house, yet were not tenantáble--
No man can sit there safe: the cannon pours
Thorough the walls untight and bullet showers,
The neighbourhood ill, and an unwholesome seat,
So at the first salute resolves retreat,
And swore that he would never more dwell there
Until the city put it in repair.
So he in front, his garrison in rear,
March straight to Chatham to increase the fear.

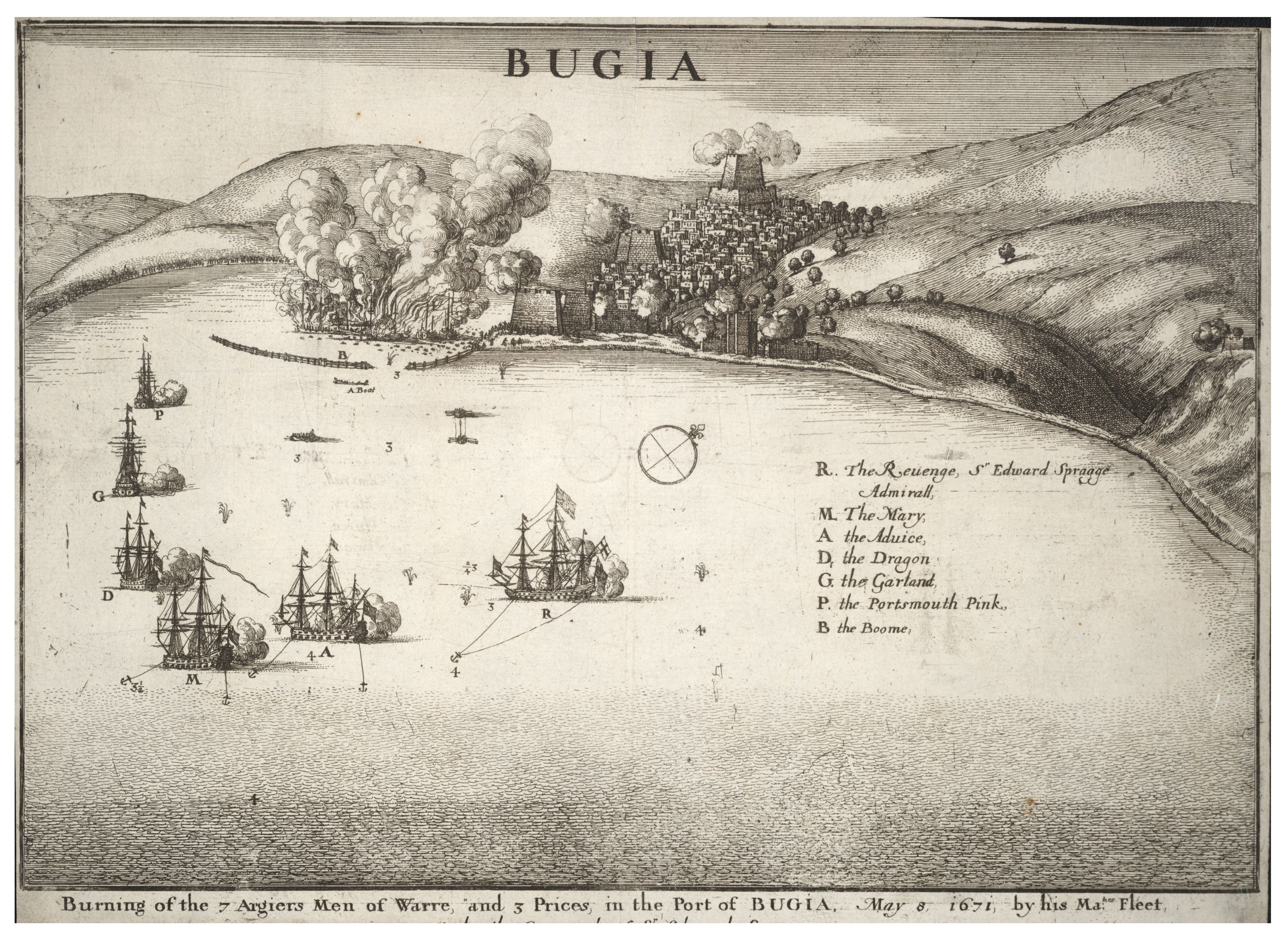
Spragge on his flagship HMS Revenge at the battle of Bugia, 8 May 1671

In 1670 and 1671, Vice Admiral Sir Edward Spragge fought the Barbary pirates on the Revenge. In the spring of 1671, he sailed with a fleet to Bougie Bay, near Algiers, where on 8 May, after a sharp fight, he burnt and destroyed ten corsair ships.

In 1672, the Third Anglo-Dutch War broke out, which gave Spragge the chance to deal with his old rival Tromp. At this time, Rupert and Spragge became rivals, the latter becoming jealous for not having been appointed supreme commander. Spragge was in command of the Red Squadron on the London in the Battle of Solebay in 1672 and of the Blue Squadron on the new Prince Royal of 100 cannon in the double Battle of Schooneveld of 1673. In these last Schooneveld battles he sought out and fought Tromp, readmitted to the navy in 1673, with great fury, but without result. Spragge publicly swore an oath in front of King Charles that the next time, he would either kill or capture his old enemy Tromp or die trying.

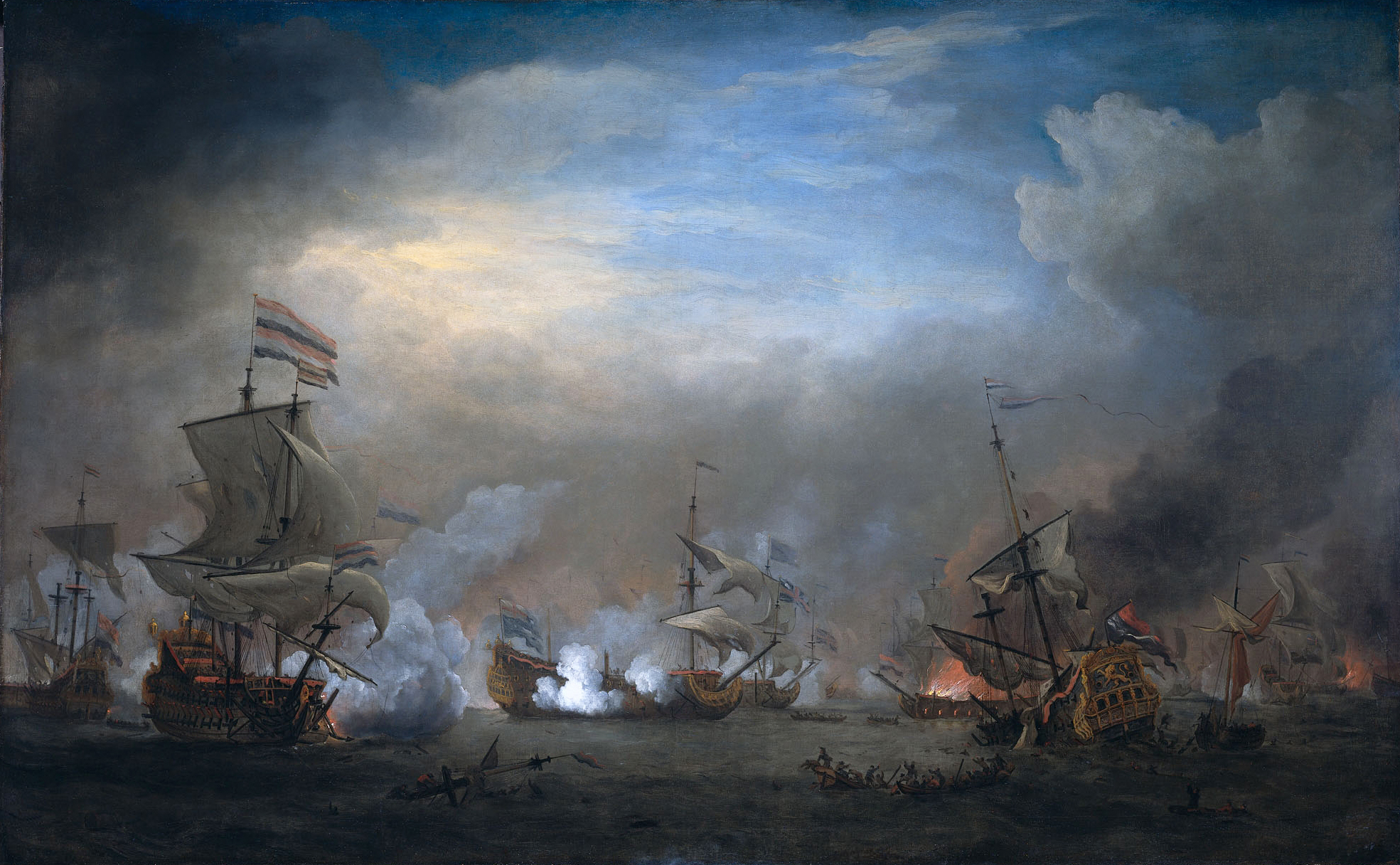
The Prince Royal dismasted at the Battle of the Texel

In the fourth Battle of Texel on 21 August 1673, Spragge and Tromp, commanding their respective rear divisions, again clashed repeatedly, each having their ships so damaged as to need to shift their flags to fresh ships twice. First the Prince Royal duelled the Gulden Leeuw; when the former ship was dismasted and half of her crew dead or wounded, Spragge shifted to HMS St George and Tromp to the Comeetstar. On the second occasion, whilst passing from the St George to the Royal Charles, Spragge's sloop was hit by cannon fire, a cannonball passing through the hull of the St George hitting the boat. The Admiral was injured but perhaps died by drowning as his vessel sank, just before reaching the ropes of the St George to which it had been rowed back as quickly as possible. The sloop remained partially floating and the body of Spragge was recovered with the head and shoulders still out of the water and his arms so cramped around the wood that much force had to be applied to free them. Contemporaneous Dutch naval historian Gerard Brandt wrote in his biography of Michiel de Ruyter: "This was the sad ending of Knight Edward Spragge, bravest of all English Admirals, who was praised by his friends and enemies for his courage and honesty and commiserated from compassion".

On 1 February 1673, Spragge had been elected as a Member of Parliament for Dover, after two ballots, but did not live to be able to sit. On 16 January 1674, it was resolved by Parliament that Spragge had failed to be elected because he had illegally influenced the election; he had in fact ordered an old and infirm pilot, who he knew intended to vote for his rival, aboard one of his ships, to prevent him from voting.

Spragge was buried in the North Choir Aisle of Westminster Abbey, but without any memorial visible today. His grave had this inscription:

Sir Edward Spragge, Kt., a brave and valiant Sea Captain, who lost his life in a sea fight against the Hollanders, 1673

He had no issue by his wife, but was the father of two illegitimate sons and one daughter by a mistress, Dorothy Dennis.

Edward Spragge was the cousin of the later admiral George Legge.

== Namesakes ==
The Royal Navy has named four ships after Spragge. The first two, HMS Spragge of 1673 (renamed HMS Young Spragge in 1677) and HMS Spragge of 1677 were fireships. The third HMS Spragge was a destroyer leader cancelled in 1919. The fourth, HMS Spragge (K572), was a frigate in commission from 1944 to 1946 which saw service during World War II.
