= English ship Portsmouth (1650) =

Fourth-rate ship of the line of the Royal Navy

History

Commonwealth of England
- Name: Portsmouth
- Ordered: April 1649
- Builder: Portsmouth Dockyard
- Launched: 1650
- Commissioned: 1650
- Honours and awards: Dover 1652; Kentish Knock 1652; Gabbard 1653; Scheveningen 1653

Kingdom of England
- Name: Portsmouth
- Acquired: May 1660
- Honours and awards: Lowestoffe 1665; Four Days' Battle 1666; Bugia 1671; Texel 1673; Bantry Bay 1689
- Captured: 9 August 1689
- Fate: Captured by French and blown up

General characteristics
- Class & type: 34-gun Fourth-Rate
- Tons burthen: 422 69/94 bm
- Length: 99 ft 0 in (30.2 m) keel for tonnage
- Beam: 28 ft 4 in (8.6 m)
- Depth of hold: 12 ft 8 in (3.9 m)
- Sail plan: ship-rigged
- Complement: 150 men in 1653
- Armament: at launch; 34 guns; 1666 Establishment; 38 guns

Portsmouth was a 34-gun (later with up to 46 guns) fourth-rate of the English Navy, built by Thomas Eastwood at Portsmouth Dockyard and launched for the Commonwealth Navy in 1650. She partook in the Battles of Dover and Kentish Knock in 1652, the Gabbard and Scheveningen in 1653. After the Restoration she was incorporated into the Royal Navy. She was present at the Battle of Lowestoft in 1665 and the Four Days' Battle. She was present at the Battle of Texel in 1673, and the Battle of Bantry Bay in 1689. She was captured by the French in August 1689 and blown up.

The Portsmouth was the first vessel in the English navy to be given that name.

== Construction ==
She was ordered in April 1649 as part of the 1649 Programme to be built at Portsmouth Dockyard under the guidance of Master Shipwright Thomas Eastwood. Her keel was laid in early 1649 and she was launched in late 1649 or early 1650. Her dimensions were 99 feet 0 inches (30.2 metres) keel reported for tonnage, breadth 28 feet 4 inches (8.6 metres), depth of hold 12 feet 8 inches (3.9 metres). Her builder's measured tonnage would be 422 69/94 tons.

Her armament when built would be 34 guns of various calibres. Her armament in 1652 was 34 guns and was increased to 42 in 1653. In 1666 it was nominally 44 guns, consisting of twenty-two culverins (Note: A culverin was a gun of 4,500 pounds with a 5.5-inch bore firing a 17.5-pound shot with a 12-pound powder charge) on the lower deck (LD), eighteen demi-culverins (Note: A demi-culverin was a gun of 3,400 pounds with a four-inch bore firing a 9.5-pound shot with an eight-pound powder charge.) on the upper deck (UD) and four sakers (Note: A sacar or saker was a gun of 1,400 pounds with a 3.5-inch bore firing a 5.5-pound shot with a 5.5-pound powder charge.) on the quarterdeck (QD). She actually carried 51 guns under the 1666 establishment, consisting of 23 culverins, twenty-two demi-culverins and six 3-pounders. Under the 1677 establishment she would carry 22 culverins, twenty 6-pounders and four sakers. The 1685 establishment added another pair of sakers to the quarterdeck; however, by 1689 she had reverted to 46 guns.

== Commissioned service ==
=== Service with Commonwealth Navy ===
She was commissioned into the Commonwealth Navy under the command of Captain William Brandley in 1650 for service on the Irish coast. She was with Blake's Squadron in the Irish Sea in 1651.

==== First Anglo-Dutch War ====
She was part of Blake's Fleet at the Battle of Dover. On 28 September 1652 she participated in the Battle of Kentish Knock. In1653 She was under the command of Captain Robert Durnford. She was at the Battle of the Gabbard as part of White Squadron, Centre Division under the command of Vice-Admiral James Peacock, on 2–3 June 1653. The British were victorious on the first day. When Admiral Tromp attempted to reattack on the 3rd he withdrew when a squadron of eighteen ships arrived under the command of Robert Blake. This fight was followed by the Battle of Scheveningen where she was a member of Red Squadron, Van Division under the command of Vice-Admiral James Peacock on 31 July 1653. Later in 1653 she came under command of Captain Joseph Cubitt for service in the Channel during the winter of 1653/54. In the spring of 1654 Captain John Bourne took command followed by Captain Anthony Young. In 1655 she was now under Captain Robert Sansum. She was involved in operations in the Sound in 1659 followed by patrols off the north coast in 1660 for the Restoration of King Charles II.

=== Service after the Restoration 1660 ===
On 17 December 1663 she was under the command of Captain Henry Tearne. She sailed with Rear-Admiral Allin's Squadron in the Mediterranean.

==== Second Anglo-Dutch War ====
Captain Robert Mohun took command on 29 March 1665. As a member of Red Squadron, Rear Division she participated in the Battle of Lowestoft on 3 June 1665. During Four Days' Battle she arrived with Prince Rupert's squadron on 4 June 1666. She was a member of the Rear Division of Prince Rupert's Squadron, suffering no casualties during the fight. Captain Thomas Guy took command on 9 June 1666. She participated in the St James Day Battle as a member of Red Squadron, Van Division on 25 July 1666. In early 1668 she was under command of Captain William Basse followed by Captain William Coleman on 23 April 1669. She sailed with Rear-Admiral Allin's Squadron to the Mediterranean. On 8 May 1671 she partook in the Battle of Bugia.

On 18 May 1672 Captain James Page took command. She was at the Battle of the Texel as a member of Blue Squadron on 11 August 1673. Captain Page died on 16 April 1674. On the 23rd of April 1675 Captain James Storey took command for service in the Mediterranean. On 30 August Captain George Saint Loe was in command. She sailed with Dartmouth's Fleet in October 1688. She was in the Battle of Bantry Bay on 1 May 1689.

== Loss ==
She was taken by the French 58-gun La Marquise in the English Channel on 9 August 1689 and destroyed.
