= English ship Adventure (1646) =

Ship of the line of the Royal Navy

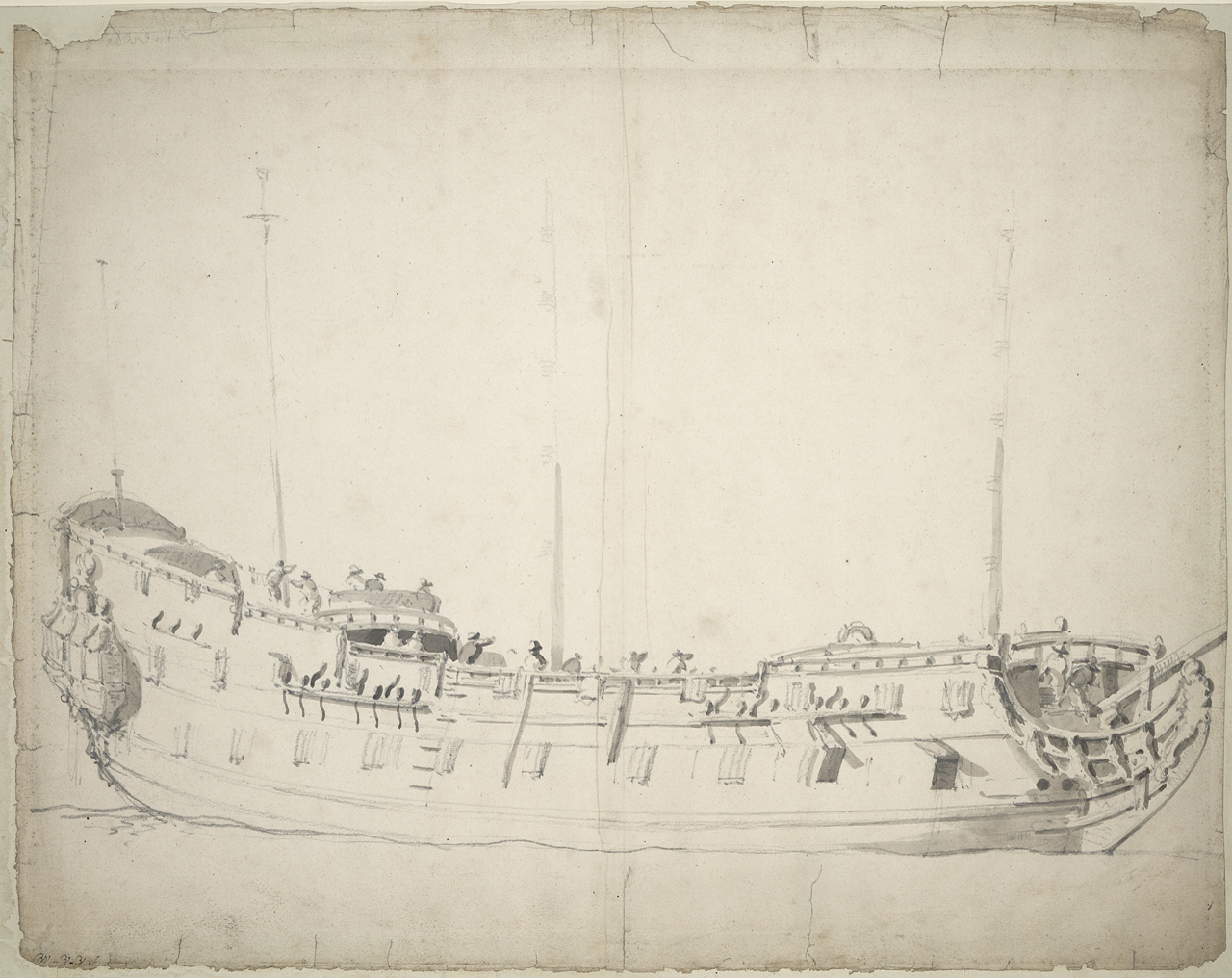
- Portrait of the Adventure as a 40-gun fourth-rate, drawn by Willem van de Velde the Elder

History

England
- Name: Adventure
- Ordered: December 1645
- Builder: Woolwich Dockyard
- Launched: 1646
- Commissioned: 1646
- Honours and awards: Dover 1652; Portland 1653; Gabbard 1653; Scheveningen 1653; Lowestoffe 1665; Oxfordness 1666; Solebay 1672; Golden Horse Action 1681; Two Lions Action 1681; Barfleur 1692
- Captured: By the French on 1 March 1709

General characteristics
- Class & type: 34-gun Fourth-Rate
- Tons burthen: 3853/94 bm
- Length: 94 ft (29 m) keel for tonnage
- Beam: 27 ft 9 in (8.5 m)
- Draught: 13 ft 9 in (4.2 m)
- Depth of hold: 13 ft (4 m)
- Sail plan: ship-rigged
- Armament: at launch; 34 guns; 1666 Establishment; 10 culverins; 26 demi-culverins; 4 sakers; 1677 Establishment; 20 demi-culverins; 18 6-pounder guns; 4 sakers; in 1685; 10 culverins; 12 demi-culverins; 16 sakers; 4 3-pounder guns

General characteristics after 1691 rebuild
- Class & type: 44-gun fourth-rate ship
- Tons burthen: 43891/94 bm
- Length: 117 ft (36 m) gundeck; 98 ft (30 m) keel for tonnage
- Beam: 29 ft 0 in (8.8 m)
- Depth of hold: 12 ft (4 m)
- Sail plan: ship-rigged
- Armament: 18/16 9-pounder guns on wooden trucks (LD); 20/16 6-pounder guns on wooden trucks (UD); 6 x 3-pounder guns on wooden trucks (QD) replaced in 1703 by 4-pounders

Adventure was a 34-gun fourth-rate of the English Navy, built by Peter Pett II at Woolwich Dockyard and launched in 1646. With the outbreak of the English Civil War she served on the Parliamentary side until 1649. She was incorporated into the Commonwealth Navy in 1650. She partook in the Battle off Dover in 1652, the Battle of Portland and the Battle of Gabbard in 1653. Adventure was employed on Bulstrode Whitelocke's embassy to Sweden, 1653–1654. After the Restoration she was incorporated into the Royal Navy. She was present at the Battle of Lowestoft (1665) and the Battle of Solebay (1672). She also participated in the Golden Horse and Two Lions actions in 1681. She was in the Battle of Barfleur in 1692. She captured several ships in the later part of her career, before being captured by the French in 1709.

Adventure was the second vessel to be given that name in the English Navy, since it had been used for a 26-gun galley, built at Deptford in 1594 and broken up in 1645.

== Construction ==
She was ordered in December 1645 as part of the 1646 Programme. She was built at Woolwich Dockyard under a contract with Master Shipwright Peter Pett II, who designed her and oversaw her construction. She was launched in 1646. Her dimensions were 94 feet 0 inches (28.7 metres) keel reported for tonnage, breadth 27 feet 9 inches (8.5 metres), depth of hold 13 feet 0 inches (4.0 metres) with a draught of 13 feet 9 inches (4.2 metres). Her tonnage was thus 3853/94 bm Later reports gave her a burthen tonnage of 510, indicating a possible eventual girdling to a new breadth of 31 feet 11 inches (9.7 metres).

Her armament varied during her time as a fourth rate. In 1666 she carried 38 guns: ten culverins, (Note: A culverin was a gun of 4,500 pounds with a 5.5-inch bore firing a 17.5-pound shot with a 12-pound powder charge.) fourteen demi-culverins, (Note: A demi-culverin was a gun of 3,400 pounds with a four-inch bore firing a 9.5-pound shot with an eight-pound powder charge.) eighteen 6-pounder guns and four sakers. (Note: A sacar or saker was a gun of 1,400 pounds with a 3.5-inch bore firing a 5.5-pound shot with a 5.5-pound powder charge.) In 1677 her gun armament was 44 guns in wartime and 38 guns in peacetime. Her armament consisted of twenty-two demi-culverins, eighteen 6-pounder guns and four sakers. In 1685 her armament was 40 guns consisting of twelve culverins, six demi-culverins, sixteen 6-pounder guns and six sakers. She was completed at an initial contract cost of £2,618 (Note: The cost accounting for inflation of approximately £500,300 in reference to today.) or 374 tons at £7 (Note: The cost accounting for inflation of approximately £1,300 in reference to today.) per ton, based on an originally intended breadth of 27 feet 4 inches (8.3 metres).

== Commissioned service ==
=== Service in English Civil War ===
She was commissioned in 1646 under Captain Thomas Beddall partaking in the Winter Guard during 1646/47 and in the spring moved to the Western Guard. Later in 3648 she was under Captain Andrew Ball at the blockade of Kinsale, Ireland. In 1649 she was under Captain Edward Hall then later that year Captain Ball resumed command. She was in the Isles of Scilly in the autumn of 1649.

=== Service with Commonwealth Navy ===
As part of the Commonwealth Navy, she was with Robert Blake's Fleet at Tagus in 1650, She returned with the Fleet in September/October 1650. At the Battle of Dover she was a member of Rear-Admiral Nehemiah Bourne's Squadron of nine ships on 19 May 1652. This battle is sometimes recorded as the 'Battle of Goodwin Sands'. Later in 1652 she was under the command of Captain Robert Wyard in the North Sea. She was under the command of Captain Robert Nixon at the Battle of Portland. At the Battle off Portland she was a member of Robert Blake's Fleet of eighty-four ships from 18 to 20 February 1653. This British victory secured control over the English Channel. The Dutch lost eight warships and forty merchant vessels. A few months later she was at the Battle of the Gabbard as part of Red Squadron, Van Division under the command of Vice-Admiral James Peacock, on 2–3 June 1653. The British were victorious on the first day. When Admiral Tromp attempted to attack again on the 3rd he withdrew when a squadron of eighteen ships arrived under the command of Robert Blake. This fight was followed by the Battle of Scheveningen (where she was a member of Red Squadron, Van Division) under the command of Vice-Admiral James Peacock on 31 July 1653. Later Captain Peter Foot spent the winter of 1653/54 with the east coast colliers. In 1654 under Captain Robert Sansum followed by Captain John Best in 1655. In 1657 she was under Captain Valentine Tatnell for operations in the Sound followed by the English Channel in June 1660.

=== Service after the Restoration 1661 ===
On 20 May 1661 she was under the command of Captain Hugh Hide. She sailed to Tangier in 1662. On 7 October 1664 Captain Benjamin Young took command then participated in the Battle of Lowestoft (as a member of Blue Squadron, Van Division) under the command of Captain Benjhamin Young, on 3 June 1665. As a member of Blue Squadron, Rear Division, and still under the command of Captain Benjamin Young, she was at the Battle of Oxfordness on 25 July 1666. She captured the French Rubis on 18 September 1666. Later in 1666 Captain Tapley (or Torpley) in actions against four French ships on 20 December 1666 and against three Flushing ships 31 December 1666. On 1 January 1671 she was under the command of Captain John Tyrwhitt. She participated in the Battle of Solebay (as a member of Red squadron, Centre Division), on 28 May 1673. Following this action she was in the Soundings in July 1673. On 7 August Captain John Temple took command. Captain Sir Richard Rooth took command on 22 March 1675 for an expedition against Sale, Morocco. Captain Richard Tapson took command for service in the English Channel. Captain Tapson died on 22 July 1678 with Captain William Booth, RN taking command on 30 July 1678. She destroyed the 32-gun Citron Tree near Tangiers in March/April 1680 then took the 28-gun Calibash on 11 April 1680. In April 1681 she took the 46-gun Golden Horse followed by the destruction of the 34-gun Flower Pot in December 1681. In 1690 she was ordered rebuilt at Chatham as a Fifth Rate.

== Rebuild as a Fifth Rate 1691 ==
Adventure was ordered to rebuild at Chatham Dockyard on 7 March 1690 under the guidance of Master Shipwright Robert Lee. She was launched on 20 February 1691. Her rebuilt dimensions were 117 feet 0 inches (35.7 metres) length of her gundeck with her keel reported for tonnage of 98 feet 0 inches (29.9 metres), breadth 29 feet 0 inches (8.8 metres), depth of hold 11 feet 8 inches (3.6 metres). Her armament was changed to 18 (wartime)/ 16 (peacetime) 9-pounder guns on the lower deck (LD), 20 (wartime)/16(peacetime) 6-pounder guns on the upper deck (UD) and initially six (wartime)/four (peacetime) 3-pounder guns on the quarterdeck (QD). The 3-pounders would be replaced with 4-pounders in 1703. The cost of her rebuild £3,293.15.0d (Note: The cost accounting for inflation of approximately £709,100 in reference to today.) or 425 tons @ £7.15.0d (Note: The cost accounting for inflation of approximately £1,500 in reference to today.) per ton with a saving of £350 (Note: The cost accounting for inflation of approximately £75,400 in reference to today.) saved by the old body plus £1,800.5.0d (Note: The cost accounting for inflation of approximately £387,600 in reference to today.) for ground tackle and fitting for a grand total of £4,744. (Note: The cost accounting for inflation of approximately £1,021,500 in reference to today.)

== Commissioned service after rebuild 1691 ==
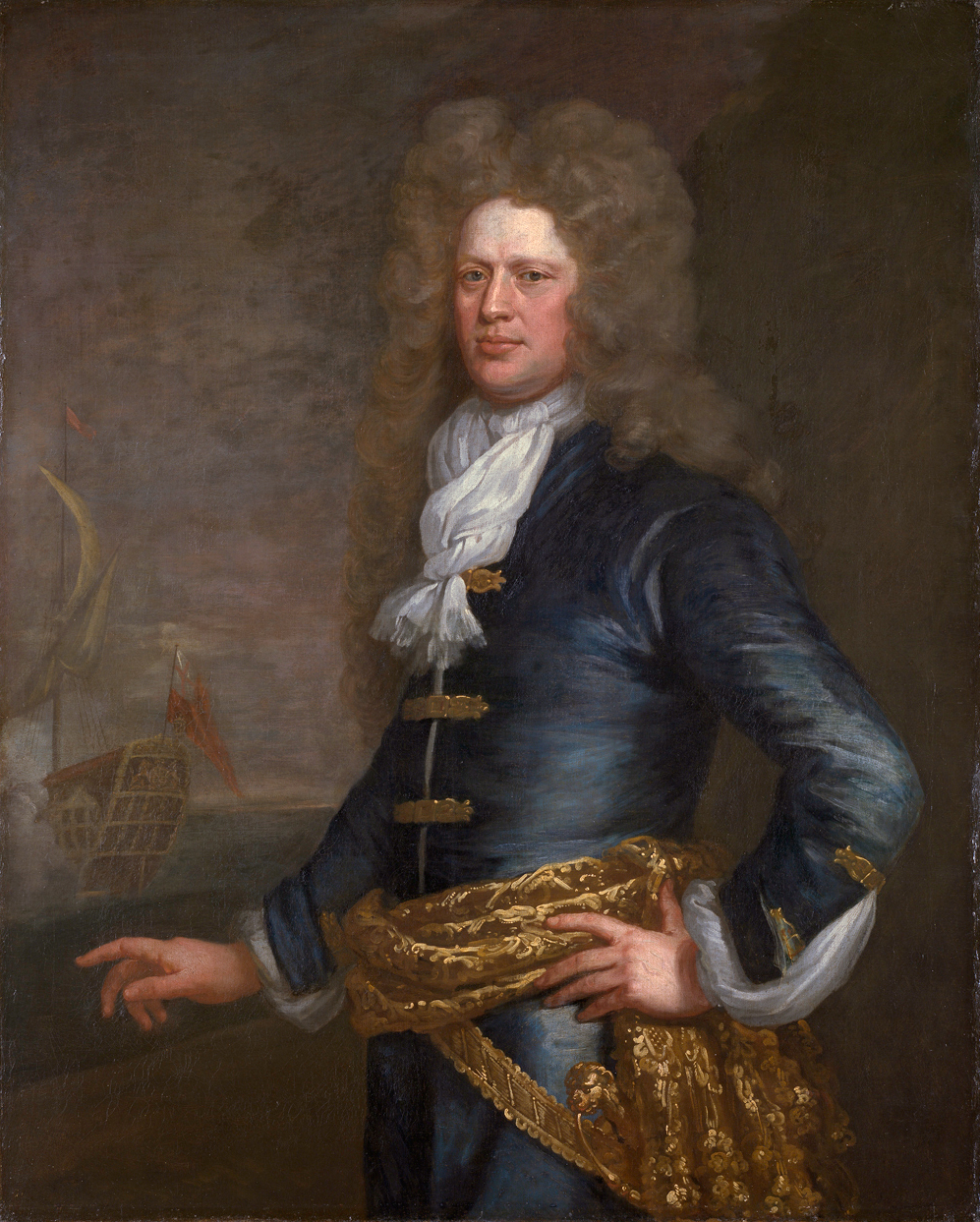
A portrait of John Balchen and the Adventure.

She was re-commissioned in 1691 under the command of Captain Thomas Dilkes. She participated in the Battle of Barfleur (as a member of Blue squadron, Centre Division) under the command of Admiral Sir John Ashby, from 19 to 24 May 1692. In concert with Rupert she captured two privateers (one 24-gun and one 18-gun) on the Irish station in October 1692. She captured two 16-gun privateers in the English Channel in December 1692. In 1694 under the command of Captain Charles Cornwall she captured with her squadron the 36-gun La Diligente (under the command of Duguay Trouin) off the Scilly Islands on 12 May 1694. The squadron was in action off Pantelleria on 28 January 1695 capturing the 60-gun Content and the 50-gun Trident. Later in January 1695 she was under command of Captain John Worrel. In 1696 she was under the command of Captain Charles Richards in the Mediterranean. In 1697 her commander was Captain John Edwards sailing with the Dunkirk squadron. In November 1698 she sailed with Aylmer's squadron to the Mediterranean. In 1701 she was back in the Dunkirk squadron with Captain John Home as commander. In 1703 she was reduced to a 40-gun ship with the removal of her 4-pounder guns. Captain John Balchen took command in February 1703. She was in action with St Pol's squadron in the North Sea where the Salisbury was taken on 10 July 1703. In 1705 Captain Edmund Hicks took command. She captured (with Tartar) the 24-gun Jeux in the North Sea on 10 July 1706. In 1707 Captain Robert Clark was in command for service in the Leeward Islands. She was with Admiral Byng's Fleet in the Channel and North Sea. In 1708 she proceeded to the West Indies with a convoy in 1709.

== Loss ==
She was captured by a French squadron off Montserrat, Martinique in the West Indies on 1 March 1709. She suffered about 100 casualties including Captain Clark. She was not added to the French Navy, but instead was sold in March 1711 at Martinique.
