= Richard Beach =

English naval officer (d. 1692)

Rear-Admiral Sir Richard Beach
- Died: 1692
- Military career
- Allegiance: Kingdom of England
- Service: Royal Navy
- Rank: Rear-Admiral of the Blue

Sir Richard Beach (died 1692) was an English naval officer and privateer. Following the execution of Charles I and the establishment of the Commonwealth of England, Beach continued to serve the Royalist cause as a privateer. After the restoration of the monarchy, Beach served in the Royal Navy until his death in 1692.

== Career ==
=== Royalist and Privateer ===
In 1651, Beach commanded a Royalist warship, the St. Michael, during John Granville's defence of the Isles of Scilly. The Royalists were defeated, and Beach was demanded as a hostage by General-at-Sea Robert Blake.

Beach reappears in the historical record in mid-1653, though it is unclear whether he was released or escaped. At this time, he began operating as a privateer out of the French port of Brest, flying the colours of Charles II.

By January 1654, Beach was captain of the Royal James, and commanding a squadron of four frigates. By February 1654, his flotilla was down to three frigates, operating off of the west coast of England. In response, the Commonwealth began to convoy merchant vessels, and withdrew a number of ships earmarked for service in the First Anglo-Dutch War.

Beach and the Royal James were captured in March 1654, off the Isles of Sicily, by the Constant Warwick under Captain Richard Potter. Beach was brought back to Plymouth, but was freed in an exchange of prisoners on 29 April, and went back to his old practice of privateering until the Restoration in 1660.

=== Restoration ===
Beach was made captain of the Crown about 1661. In 1663, he was promoted to the Leopard of fifty-fix guns, and sent as convoy to the Turkey fleet; his commission for this purpose, bearing date 14 December 1663, being inserted in the Memoirs of Naval Affairs, from the year 1666 to the year 1672, commonly called The Duke of York's Memoirs. He continued to command this ship till 1666, when the joint admirals, Prince Rupert and the Duke of Albemarle, removed him into the Fairfax. In the following year the Duke of York appointed him to the Greenwich; and, in 1669, to the Hampshire.

=== Barbary Coast ===
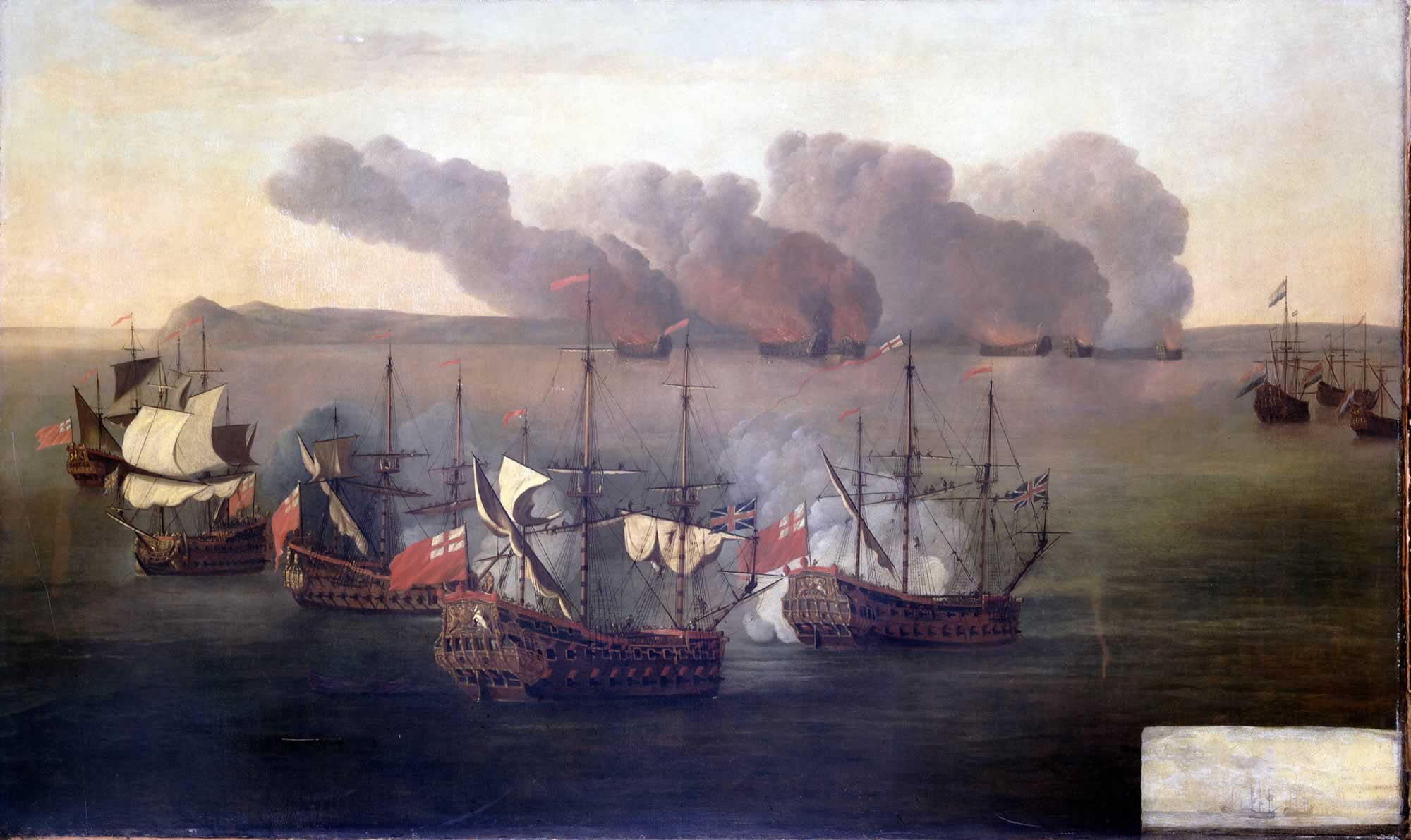
Beach and Van Ghent destroy six Barbary ships near Cape Spartel, Morocco, 17 August 1670.

In 1670, he was appointed commodore of the fleet, in the Straits, under Sir Thomas Allen and Sir Edward Spragge. In this station, through the assistance rendered by him to the Dutch, under Van Ghendt, six AIgerine corsairs, mounting from forty-four to thirty-eight guns each, were taken and destroyed at one time.

Soon afterwards he fell in (singly) with two Algerine frigates, whom he brought to action, which ended so much to their disadvantage, though he was unable to capture either, in consequence of the assistance they derived in flight from their oars; that the largest, in particular, with the greatest difficulty reached Algiers, having received seventeen shot between wind and water, and twenty-five men killed, besides fifty wounded. He soon afterwards returned to England with a convoy, and arrived in the Downs on 4 February 1671.

In 1672, having hoisted his flag on board the Monmouth, he served as rear-admiral of the blue with Sir Edward Spragge, on his expedition against the Algerines, and had the good fortune to meet with one of their best ships, mounting forty guns, and carrying three hundred and fifty men. After a short but successful action he captured her.

=== Promotions ===
The peace with Holland taking place soon after his return from the Straits, he quitted the active line of service for some time. On 24 March 1673 he was appointed commissioner of the navy; and still retaining his place at the navy board, was, on 13 March 1682–3, appointed, by the commissioners for executing the office of lord high admiral, commander of the Royal James. Nearly about the same period he had the honour of knighthood conferred on him.

On 19 April 1686, Sir Richard was made commissioner-resident at Portsmouth, and continued to receive every positive mark of attention from King James, who, when he ascended the throne in 1685, not only continued him in office, but, after a short time, promoted him to a more consequential employment than that which he had held in the previous reign. John Charnock writes, "yet so far was he from espousing measures he did not approve, and such the opinion entertained of his real integrity, at a time when it was considered as a very sufficient ground for distrust, to have received the smallest favour, or remained merely passage, as Sir Richard, from his appointment being merely of a civil nature, was, in a, great measure, compelled to be, that he was not only continued in office after the revolution, but … promoted".

Sir Richard was not only continued in office after the Glorious Revolution, but, in 1690, was appointed to the comptrollership of the victualling accounts. This he did not long continue to enjoy, for, covered with age and infirmities, the necessary consequences of a long and active service, he died in 1692.

== Sources ==
- Abernethy, Jack (2023). "Flying the late King's Colours': Royalist privateering during the First Anglo-Dutch War, 1652–1654". The Mariner's Mirror. 109 (1): 19–37. doi:10.1080/00253359.2023.2156233.
- Knighton, C. S. (2008). "Beach, Sir Richard (d. 1692), naval officer". Oxford Dictionary of National Biography (online ed.). Oxford University Press. doi:10.1093/ref:odnb/66460. (Subscription, Wikipedia Library access or UK public library membership required.)
- "Beach and Van Ghent destroy six Barbary ships near Cape Spartel, Morocco, 17 August 1670". Royal Museums Greenwich. Retrieved 4 January 2023.

Attribution:

- Charnock, John (1794). "Beach, Richard". Biographia Navalis. Vol. 1. London: Printed for R. Faulder. pp. 51–53.
