= Battle of Dover (1652) =

Military battle of First Anglo-Dutch War

Coordinates: 51.274°N 1.508°E

- Part of First Anglo-Dutch War
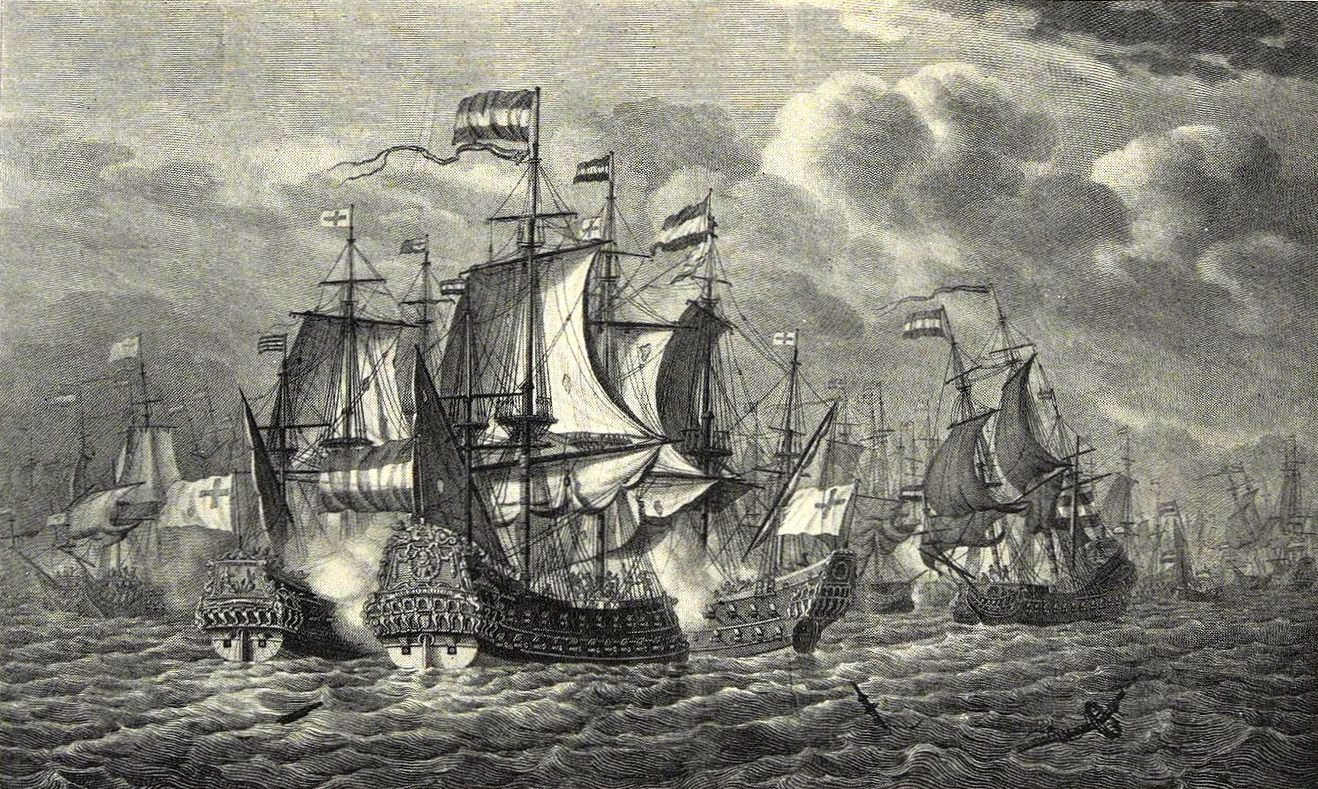
- Tromp v Blake off Dover
Date	19 May 1652
Location	Off Straits of Dover
Result	Inconclusive

Belligerents
Dutch Republic	Commonwealth of England

Commanders and leaders
(Dutch Republic) Maarten Tromp	(Commonwealth of England) Robert Blake (Commonwealth of England) Benjamin Blake

Strength
47 ships	25 ships

Casualties and losses
1 ship captured	Unknown

The naval Battle of Dover, fought on 19 May 1652 (29 May 1652 Gregorian calendar), (Note: During this period in English history dates of events are usually recorded in the Julian calendar, while those the Netherlands are recorded in the Gregorian calendar. In this article dates are in the Julian calendar with the start of the year adjusted to 1 January (see Old Style and New Style dates).) was the first engagement of the First Anglo-Dutch War between the navies of the Commonwealth of England and the United Provinces of the Netherlands. It proved to be an indecisive battle involving the flagships of Admirals Maarten Tromp and Robert Blake. Opinions about the outcome of that battle vary among historians of that period.

== Background ==
The English Parliament had passed the first of the Navigation Acts in October 1651, aimed at hampering the shipping of the highly trade-dependent Dutch. Agitation among the Dutch merchants had been further increased by George Ayscue's capture in early 1652 of 27 Dutch ships trading with the royalist colony of Barbados in contravention of an embargo. Both sides had begun to prepare for war, but conflict might have been delayed if not for an unfortunate encounter on 29 May 1652 (19 May in the Julian calendar then in use in England) near the Straits of Dover between a Dutch convoy escorted by 40 ships under Lieutenant-Admiral Maarten Tromp and an English fleet of 25 ships under General-at-Sea Robert Blake.

== Battle ==
Prior to the battle, Oliver Cromwell had issued an ordinance requiring all foreign warships in the North Sea or English Channel to lower their flag in salute when encountering ships of the English navy. Combined with Ayscue's seizure of the Dutch merchantmen trading with Barbados, this led to a rapid deterioration in Anglo-Dutch relations. Tromp was subsequently given orders to protect Dutch commerce while keeping watch over the English navy. On 19 May 1652, Tromp was cruising in the English Channel with a fleet of forty ships between Nieuport and the mouth of the Meuse River. General at Sea Robert Blake was lying in Dover Roads with fifteen warships, with eight others were anchored in Bourne in the Downs.

While on patrol, Tromp received orders from a dispatch ketch to attack Blake's fleet, and had not struck his flag in salute. Blake, aboard his flagship James, assumed Tromp had received orders to commence battle and fired two warning shots. A defiant Tromp hoisted a red battle flag, which prompted James to fire a third shot, hitting Tromp's ship Brederode and wounding a number of its crew. This was followed with Tromp returning fire with a warning broadside from Brederode. James in turn fired a broadside and a battle that would last five hours ensued. Tromp immediately engaged Blake's flag ship where the two ships exchanged broadsides as they passed one another.

While tacking to turn and fire another broadside, Brederode came into violent contact with President, which grappled with the Brederode and began boarding it. During the fierce melee that followed, Tromp's crew forced the attackers back on to their own ship. At this time, the English ship Garland came along to the other side of Brederode, placing it between President and Garland. Johan Evertsen, now aware of Tromp's plight, quickly came to assist, placing his ship directly alongside President and firing broadsides which severed all her masts, after which Evertsen's crew boarded her and engaged in hand-to-hand fighting before being beaten back. The fighting continued until nightfall, where both sides withdrew, the battle having no distinct victor. The ships of Tromp and Evertsen divided their prisoners between them and sailed back toward Texel, with Blake, with his flagship in tow making his way to Dover.

== Aftermath ==
Both fleets were damaged, but as darkness fell the Dutch fleet withdrew in a defensive line to protect the convoy, and the English captured two Dutch stragglers: Sint Laurens, which was taken back by them but not used, and Sint Maria, which was abandoned in a sinking condition and later made its way to the Netherlands. Tromp then offered his excuses to Blake and asked for the return of the prize, but this was refused by Blake.

War was declared by the Commonwealth of England on 8 July 1652.

== Ships involved ==
=== England (Robert Blake) ===
Totals: Ships: 24 Cannon: 908

Anthony Young's squadron

- President 36 (Anthony Young)
- Nightingale 24 (Jacob Reynolds)
- Recovery 24 (Edmund Chapman)

Robert Blake's squadron in Rye Bay

- James 60 (flag, Robert Blake, captain John Gilson)
- Victory 52 (Lionel Lane)
- Garland 44 (John Gibbs)
- Speaker 52 (John Coppin)
- Ruby 42 (Anthony Houlding)
- Sapphire 38 (Robert Moulton, Jr)
- Worcester 42 (Charles Thorowgood)
- Star 12 (Robert Saunders)
- Portsmouth 36 (William Brandley)
- Martin 12 (Robert Clarke, Jnr)
- Mermaid 24 (Richard Stayner)
- Reuben 26 (hired merchantman)
- 3 small

Nehemiah Bourne's squadron in the Downs

- Andrew 56 (Nehemiah Bourne)
- Triumph 62 (William Penn) – Ashore during the battle
- Fairfax 52 (John Lawson)
- Happy Entrance 44 (Edward Chapman)
- Centurion 36 (Walter Wood)
- Adventure 36 (Andrew Ball)
- Assurance 40 (Benjamin Blake)
- Greyhound 18 (Henry Southwood)
- Seven Brothers 26 (hired merchantman, Robert Land)

=== The Netherlands (Maarten Tromp) ===
Totals: Ships: 44 Cannon: 1274

Note that only some of the following ships were owned by the Dutch Admiralties - Tromp's flagship Brederode was from the Rotterdam (or Maas) Admiralty, while the Monnikendam (32 guns), Hoorn (30 guns), Prins Maurits (28 guns), Wapen van Alkmaar (28 guns), Alkmaar (28 guns) and Stad Medemblik (28) were from the Noorderkwartier Admiralty. All the other Dutch vessels were hired merchantmen.

Convoyers

- Groningen 38 (Joris van der Zaan)
- Zeelandia 34 (Jacob Huyrluyt)

The fleet in The Downs
Van

- Brederode 54 (Maarten Harpertszoon Tromp, Admiral, RDA)
- Alexander 28 (Jan Maijkers, AD)
- Blauwen Arend 28 (Dirck Pater, AD)
- Sint Salvador 34 (Matheeus Corneliszoon, AD)
- Vliegende Faam 28 (Jacob Corneliszoon Swart, AD)
- Arche Troijane 28 (Abraham van Kampen, AD)
- Kroon Imperiaal 34 (Cornelis Janszoon Poort, AD)
- Valck 28 (Cornelis Janszoon Brouwer, AD)
- Prinses Roijaal 28 (Maarten de Graeff, AD)
- Neptunis 34 (Gerrit van Lummen, AD)
- Sint Matheeus 34 (Cornelis Naeuoogh, AD)
- Prins Maurits 34 (Nicolaes de With, AD)
- Rozeboom 28 (Gerrit Schuyt, AD)
- Engel Gabriel 28 (Bastiaan Bardoel, AD)
- Witte Lam 28 (Cornelis van Houten, AD)
- Gideon van Sardam 34 (Hector Bardesius, AD)
- Sint Francisco 28 (Stoffel Juriaenszoon, AD)
- David en Goliad 34 (Claes Bastiaenszoon Jaarsveld, AD)
- Elias 34 (Jacob Sijvertsen Spanheijm, AD)
- Zwarte Leeuw 28 (Hendrik de Raedt, AD)
- Sint Maria 28 (Sipke Fockes, AD) – Captured but abandoned and recaptured
- Groote Liefde 38 (Bruyn van Seelst, AD)
- Nassouw van den Burgh 34 (Lambert Pieterszoon, AD)
- Groote Vergulde Fortuijn 35 (Frederick de Coninck, AD)
- Engel Michiel 28 (Fredrick Bogaart, AD)
- Vergulde Haan 30 (Jan le Sage, MD)
- Goude Leeuw 30 (Jacob Penssen, MD)
- Leeuwinne 30 (Joannes van Regermorter, MD)
- Sint Laurens 30 (Bastiaan Tuynemans, MD) – Captured
- Witte Lam 32 (Jan Tijssen Matheeus, VD)

Rear

- Monnikendam 32 (Pieter Florissen, Rear Admiral, NKA)
- Hoorn (or Wapen van Hoorn) 30 (Pieter Aldertszoon, NKA)
- Prins Maurits 28 (Cornelis Pieterszoon Taenman, NKA)
- Monnikendam 24 (Arent Dirckszoon, NKA)
- Wapen van Enkhuizen 30 (Gerrit Femssen, ND)
- Wapen van Alkmaar (or Burcht van Alkmaar) 28 (Gerrit Nobel, NKA)
- Roode Leeuw 24 (Reynst Corneliszoon Sevenhuysen, ND)
- Peereboom 24 (Tijs Sijmonszoon Peereboom, ND)
- Huis van Nassau 28 (Gerrit Munth, ND)
- Alkmaar 28 (Jan Warnaertszoon Capelman, NKA)
- Sampson 26 (Willem Ham, ND)
- Stad Medemblik 28 (Pieter Jacobszoon Schellinger, NKA)

Explanation of the Abbreviations for ownership of Dutch vessels:

- AD – Amsterdam Directors' ships
- MD – Middelburg Admiralty and Directors
- ND – Noorderkwartier Director's ships
- NKA – Noorderkwartier Admiralty
- RDA – Rotterdam Admiralty
- VD – Vlissingen Directors

== Bibliography ==
- Britannica curators (2023). Anglo-Dutch Wars: European history. Encyclopedia Britannica.
- Dixon, William Hepworth (1852). Robert Blake, admiral and general at sea. London: Chapman and Hall.
- Hannay, David (1886). Admiral Blake. New York: D. Appleton and Company.
- Lambert, Andrew D. (2008). Admirals : the naval commanders who made Britain great. London: Faber. ISBN 978-0-57123-1560.
- Low, Charles Rathbone (1872). Great battles of the British navy. London: George Routledge and Sons.
- Mets, James Andrew (1902). Naval heroes of Holland. New York; London: The Abbey Press.
- R Hainsworth, C Churches (1998) The Anglo-Dutch Wars 1652-1674, Sutton Publishing ISBN 0-7509-1787-3
- NAM Roger (2004) The Command of the Ocean, Penguin Books ISBN 0-140-28896-1
