= English ship Victory (1620) =

Ship of the line of the Royal Navy

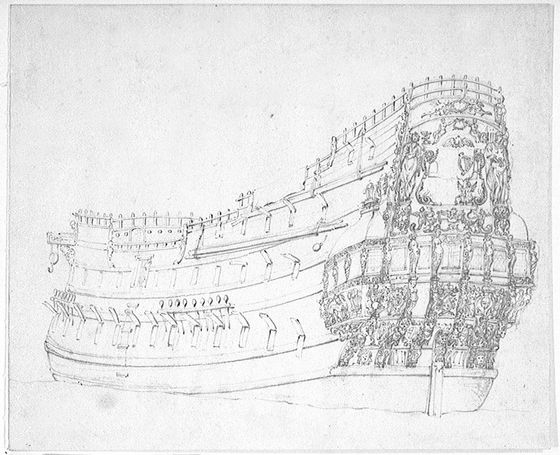
- Portrait of Victory by Willem van de Velde the Elder, 1655

History

England
- Name: Victory
- Ordered: 10 March 1620
- Builder: William Burrell, Deptford Dockyard
- Launched: 1620
- Commissioned: 1627
- Fate: Broken up, 1691
- Notes: Participated in: Battle of Dover; Battle of Dungeness; Battle of Portland; Battle of the Gabbard; Battle of Texel; Four Days Battle; St. James's Day Battle; Battle of Solebay; Battle of Schooneveld; Battle of Texel

General characteristics as built
- Class & type: 42-gun great ship
- Tons burthen: 870 79/94 bm
- Length: 108 ft 0 in (32.92 m) (keel)
- Beam: 35 ft 9 in (10.90 m) , later raised (probably through girdling) to 37 ft 6 in (11.43 m)
- Depth of hold: 17 ft 0 in (5.18 m)
- Sail plan: Full-rigged ship
- Complement: 260–300
- Armament: 42 guns

General characteristics after 1666 rebuild
- Class & type: 82-gun second-rate ship of the line
- Tons burthen: 1029 74/94 bm
- Length: 121 ft (37 m) (keel)
- Beam: 40 ft (12 m)
- Depth of hold: 17 ft 6 in (5.33 m)
- Sail plan: Full-rigged ship
- Armament: 82 guns of various weights of shot

Victory was a great ship of the English Navy, launched in 1620 and in active service during the seventeenth century's Anglo-Dutch Wars. After a seventy-year naval career, she was broken up at Woolwich Dockyard in 1691 and her timbers reused in other vessels.

== Naval career ==
Victory was designed by naval architect Phineas Pett and built by shipwright Andrew Burrell at Deptford Dockyard. She was launched as a 42-gun vessel with 270 crew, on 10 October 1620.

The ship was first commissioned in 1621 to join a fleet under Admiral Robert Mansell, which was cruising the Mediterranean to hunt for Algerian pirates. The fleet returned to English waters in the autumn of 1621, and Victory was assigned to patrol the English Channel throughout the winter, in order to protect merchant shipping making the crossing from the continent.

In May 1622 she was named as flagship to the Earl of Oxford, who had committed to clear pirates from the seas around Dunkirk. The mission ended in failure, no pirates being encountered in the entire cruise along the Dunkirk shores.

Victory was recommissioned under Captain Thomas Kettleby for the abortive attack on La Rochelle in 1627. During the First Anglo-Dutch War, under the command of Lionel Lane, she took part in the Battles of Dover (19 May 1652), Dungeness (29 November 1652), Portland (18 February), the Gabbard (2 June 1653 – 3 June 1653) and Texel (31 July 1653). By 1660 she was armed with 56 guns.

=== Second Dutch War ===
By 1665, Victory had been reduced to ordinary status at Chatham Dockyard, and in 1666 she was rebuilt there by Phineas Pett II as an 82-gun second-rate ship of the line. Recommissioned under Sir Christopher Myngs, she took part in the Four Days Battle of 1666 (where Myngs was killed), and on 25 July 1666 in the St. James's Day Battle under Sir Edward Spragge.

Spragge was assigned to command the Blue Squadron in the English rear. Victory was therefore too far to the south to take part in the early stages of the battle, and was one of the vessels cut off from the centre by the arrival of the Dutch rear commanded by Cornelius Tromp. Spragge's and Tromp's forces were vigorously engaged from the afternoon of the first day, with Victory coming to the aid of the dismasted HMS Loyal London when that vessel caught fire in the midst of battle. Two of Victory's crew distinguished themselves during the fight. Her second in command, the eighteen year old John Wilmot, 2nd Earl of Rochester, earned Spragge's commendation for rowing messages across to another English vessel while under heavy cannon and musket fire. Meanwhile, the ship's chaplain, Reverend Speed, abandoned the cockpit where he had been offering last rites to the wounded, and instead took his turn loading and firing the cannons. A song invented by the crew after the battle described Speed as "praying like a Christian while fighting like a Turk."

The Dutch blockade being broken, Victory returned to the Thames for repair. In June the Dutch fleet returned, taking the English by surprise in the Raid on the Medway; the defenceless and half-repaired Victory was hastily towed close to shore and sunk in mud to prevent the Dutch from seizing or burning her. The scuttling worsened her condition, and despite refloating and extensive refitting, was not declared seaworthy until 1668.

=== Third Dutch War ===
During the Third Dutch War she participated in the Battle of Solebay (on 28 May 1672 under Lord Ossory), the two Battles of Schooneveld (on 28 May and 4 June 1673 under Sir William Jennens), and the Battle of Texel (on 11 August 1673, still under Jennens). By 1685 her armament had been reduced to 80 guns.

She was broken up in 1691 at Woolwich Dockyard.
