= English ship Jersey (1654) =

Ship of the line of the Royal Navy

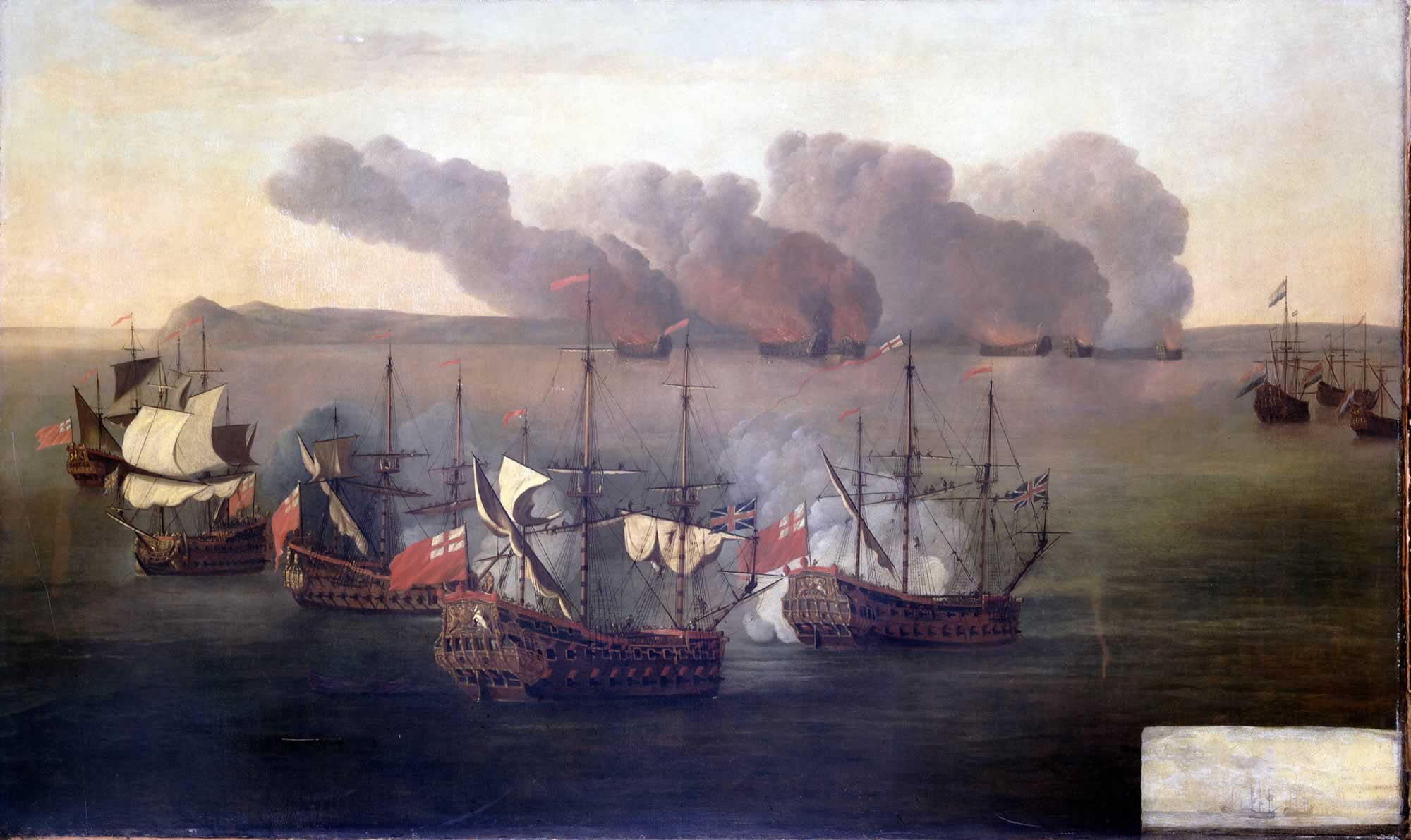
- Commodore Richard Beach and Dutch Admiral Van Ghent in a joint task force destroy six Barbary ships near Cape Spartel, Morocco, 17 August 1670, Jersey is the third left ship shown

History

England
- Name: Jersey
- Ordered: 27 December 1652
- Builder: James Starling, Maldon
- Launched: 1654
- Commissioned: 1654
- Captured: 1691, by the French

France
- Acquired: 1691
- Fate: Destroyed, 10 May 1694

General characteristics
- Class & type: Fourth rate frigate
- Tons burthen: 560 43/94 bm
- Length: 101 ft 10 in (31.0 m) (keel)
- Beam: 32 ft 2 in (9.8 m)
- Draught: 15 ft 6 in (4.7 m)
- Depth of hold: 13 ft 3 in (4.0 m)
- Propulsion: Sails
- Sail plan: Full-rigged ship
- Complement: 190
- Armament: 40 guns (1660); 48 guns (1677)

Jersey was a 40-gun fourth rate frigate of the English Navy, originally built for the navy of the Commonwealth of England by the contract shipbuilder James Starling at Maldon, Essex, and launched in 1654. In 1660 at the Stuart Restoration she became part of the new Royal Navy without change of name. By 1666 her armament had been increased to 48 guns, comprising 22 culverins on the lower deck, 20 demi-culverins on the upper deck, and 6 sakers on the quarterdeck.

In 1669, the diarist Samuel Pepys, while a member of the Navy Board, was temporarily named captain of Jersey as a legal maneuver to make him eligible to sit on a court-martial.

In March 1689 Jersey, together with the merchantman Deliverance brought stores to the city of Derry, which allowed it to sustain the Siege of Derry. The expedition was commanded by Captain James Hamilton, later the 6th Earl of Abercorn. The Jersey was commanded by Captain John Beverley RN.

Jersey was captured by two French warships off Guadeloupe on 18 December 1691 and added to the French Navy under the name Jerzé. She was attacked in Berthiaume Bay on 10 May 1694 by the British warships Monmouth, Resolution and fireship Roebuck, but survived and remained in the French service until sold in 1717.
