= English ship Leopard (1659) =

Ship of the line of the Royal Navy

History

England
- Name: Leopard
- Ordered: 29 September 1657
- Builder: Jonas Shish, Deptford Dockyard
- Launched: February 1659
- Fate: Sunk as breakwater, 1699

General characteristics
- Class & type: Fourth-rate frigate
- Tons burthen: 645 bm
- Length: 109 ft (33.2 m) (keel)
- Beam: 33 ft 9 in (10.3 m)
- Depth of hold: 15 ft (4.6 m)
- Sail plan: Full-rigged ship
- Armament: 44 guns (1660); 54 guns (1677)

Leopard was a 44-gun fourth-rate frigate of the English Royal Navy, originally built for the navy of the Commonwealth of England at Deptford, and launched in February 1659. By 1666 her armament had been increased to 56 guns.

Leopard was sunk as the foundation for a breakwater in 1699.
