= English ship Hampshire (1653) =

Ship of the line of the Royal Navy

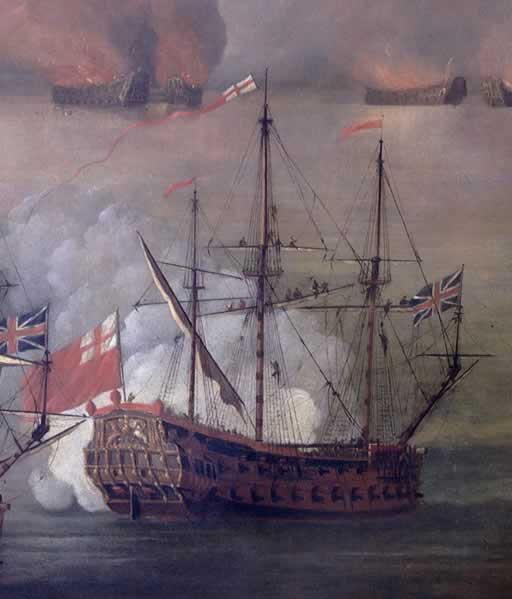
- Hampshire

History

England
- Name: HMS Hampshire
- Builder: Phineas Pett II, Deptford
- Launched: 1653
- Fate: Sunk, 26 August 1697

General characteristics as built
- Class & type: Fourth-rate frigate
- Tons burthen: 479
- Length: 101 ft 9 in (31.0 m) (keel)
- Beam: 29 ft 9 in (9.1 m)
- Depth of hold: 12 ft 8 in (3.9 m)
- Propulsion: Sails
- Sail plan: Full-rigged ship
- Armament: 38 guns (at launch); 46 guns (1677)

General characteristics after 1686 rebuild
- Class & type: 46-gun fourth-rate ship of the line
- Tons burthen: 489
- Length: 118 ft (36.0 m) (gundeck)
- Beam: 30 ft 2 in (9.2 m)
- Depth of hold: 11 ft 8 in (3.6 m)
- Propulsion: Sails
- Sail plan: Full-rigged ship
- Armament: 46 guns of various weights of shot

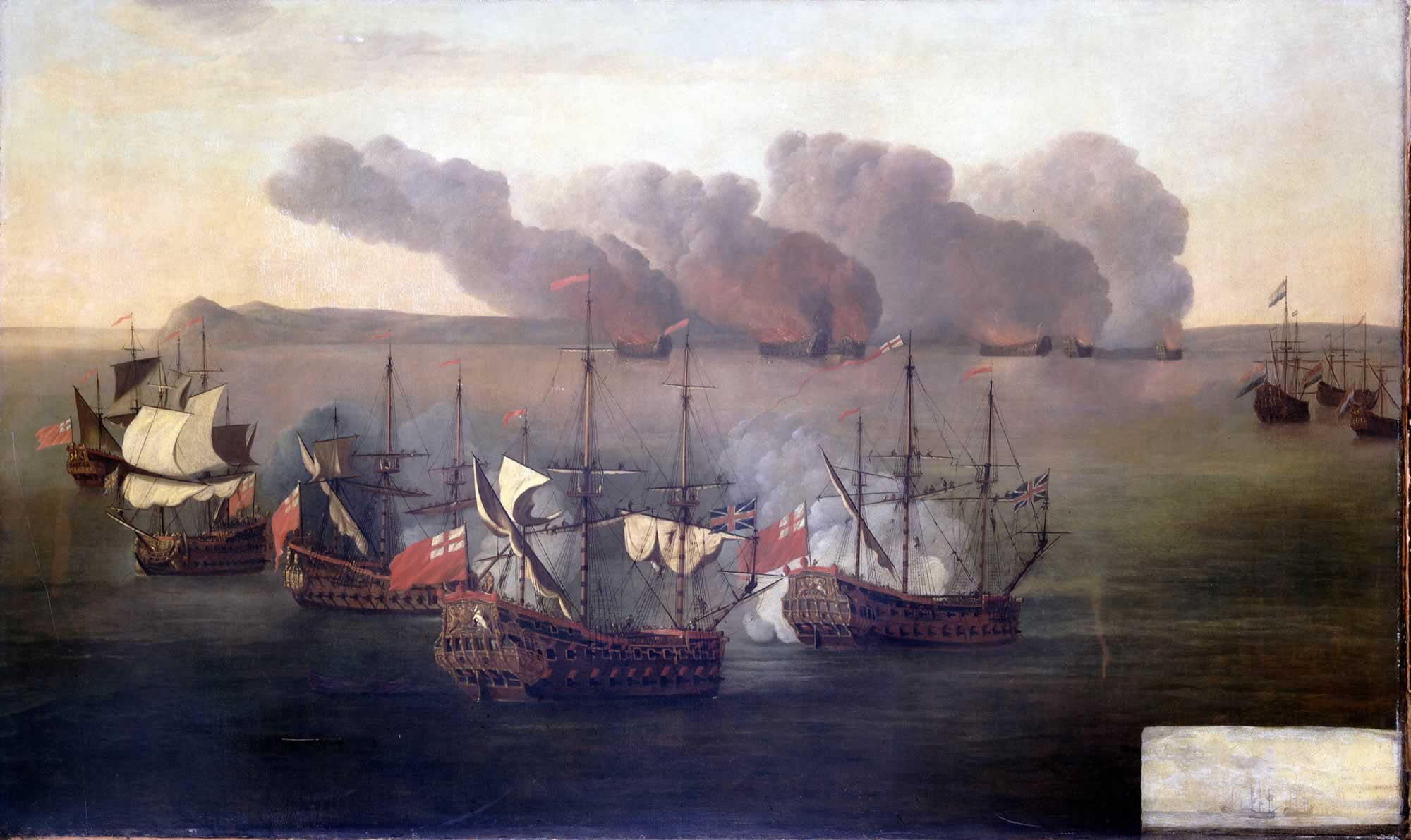
Commodore Richard Beach and Dutch Admiral Van Ghent in a joint task force destroy six Barbary ships near Cape Spartel, Morocco, 17 August 1670, Hampshire is the centre right ship shown

HMS Hampshire was a 38-gun fourth-rate frigate of the English Royal Navy, originally built for the navy of the Commonwealth of England by Phineas Pett II at Deptford, and launched in 1653. By 1677 her armament had been increased to 46 guns.

In 1686 Hampshire was rebuilt at Deptford Dockyard as a 46-gun fourth-rate ship of the line. She was sunk in action on 26 August 1697 in the waters of Hudson Bay off York Factory. Manitoba. during the Battle of Hudson's Bay.
