= English ship Triumph (1623) =

Royal Navy 42-gun great ship

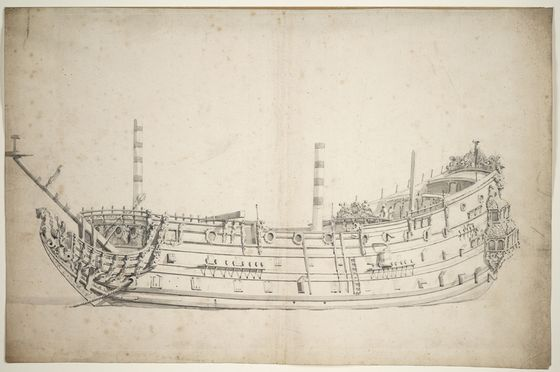
- Portrait of Triumph by Willem van de Velde the Younger, 1675

History

England
- Name: Triumph
- Ordered: 3 February 1623
- Builder: William Burrell, Deptford Dockyard
- Launched: 1623
- Fate: Sold, 1688

General characteristics
- Class & type: 42-gun great ship
- Tons burthen: 7791/2 bm initially; 92481/94 bm eventually
- Length: 110 ft (34 m) (keel) initially; 117 ft (36 m) (keel) eventually
- Beam: 36 ft 6 in (11.13 m) initially; 38 ft 6 in (11.73 m) eventually
- Depth of hold: 17 ft (5.2 m)
- Sail plan: Full-rigged ship
- Armament: 42 guns of various weights of shot

Triumph was a 42-gun great ship or second rate warship of the Navy of the Kingdom of England, built by William Burrell (the Master Shipwright to the East India Company) at Deptford Royal Dockyard and launched in 1623. Like many major warships in the 17th century, she was modified at various times during her life, so that her dimensions and tonnage grew during her 65 years of service.

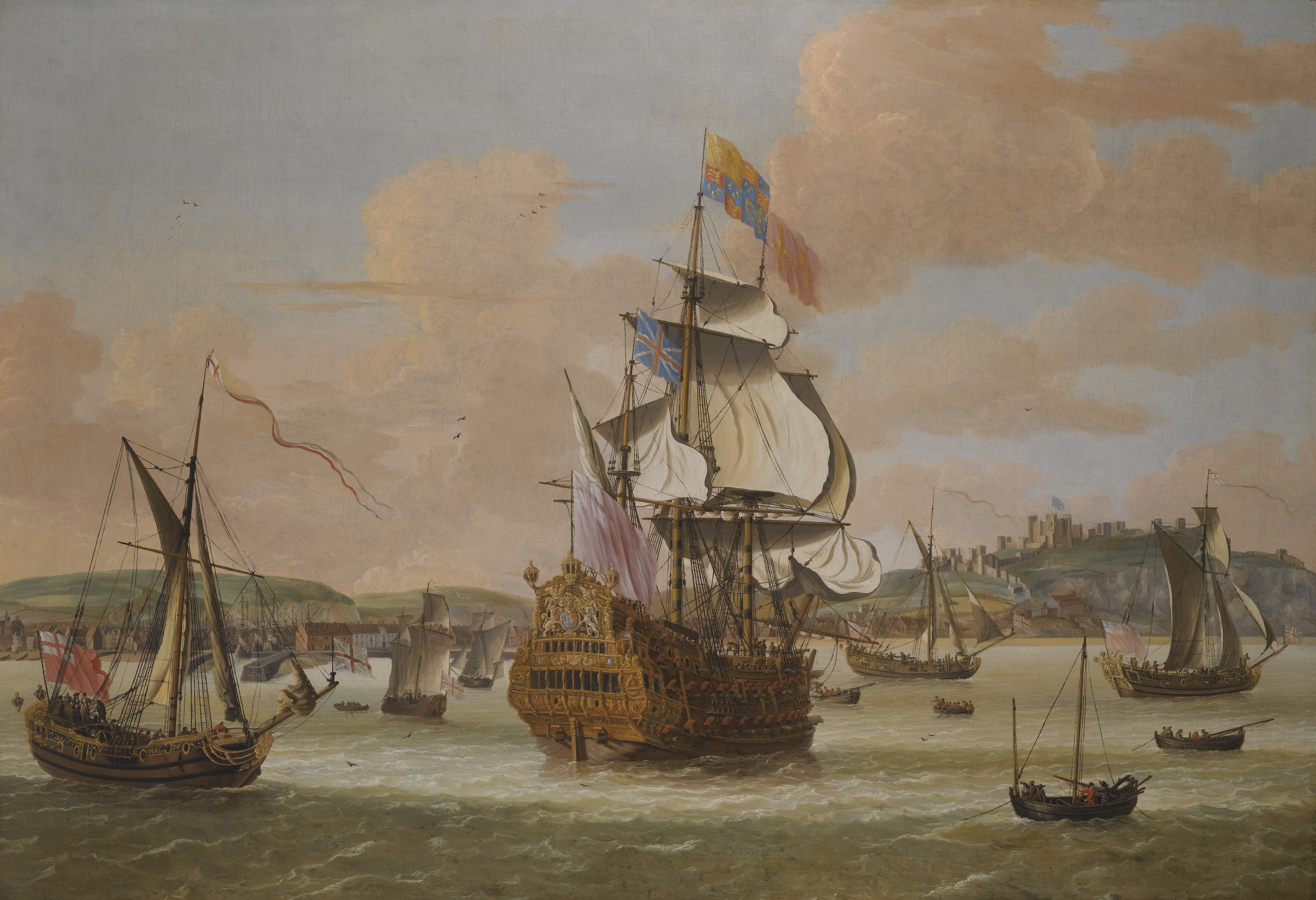
Triumph with Charles II and James, Duke of York on board and three Royal Yachts near Dover in 1665; Jacob Knyff

By 1660 her original armament had been increased to 64 guns and by 1666 to 72 guns.

== Design and modification ==
The Triumph was the last of the six "Great Ships" (or Second rates) to be designed and built at Deptford Dockyard for James I's navy by Burrell (as well as three Third rates and a Fourth rate). The other Second Rates were the Constant Reformation, Victory, Swiftsure, Saint Andrew and Saint George. The first three ships were designed with a keel length of 103 ft and a beam of 34 ft, but in the second trio the design was enlarged to 110 ft keel length by 36 ft 6 in, and following battle damage during the First Anglo-Dutch War the keel was extended by some 6 or 7 ft (the overall length remaining unchanged as the rake of the stem and stern was reduced) and the breadth was increased to 38 or 38.5 ft. Her burthen tonnage increased to 92481/94 bm (nominally to 921 tons).

Like the preceding five, the Triumph was built as a two-decked ship with 42 guns, but during Charles I's reign a spar deck was added over the upper deck, and later this was hardened to support a third gundeck; unlike the earlier five ships, in the Triumph a forecastle was eventually added above this third deck. By 1652 she carried 60 guns, raised to 64 by 1660 and 72 in 1666 (comprising 20 demi-cannon, 26 culverins, 24 demi-culverins and 2 sakers). Her original complement of 300 men rose to 380 in 1666 and eventually to 460 in wartime.

== Career and Fate ==
In 1627 the Triumph was the flagship of the Duke of Buckingham in the La Rochelle campaign. She became part of the Navy of the Commonwealth of England in 1649. During the First Anglo-Dutch War she took part in all the major naval battles - the Battle of Dover (1652), the Battle of Kentish Knock (1652), the Battle of Dungeness (1652), the Battle of Portland (1653), the Battle of the Gabbard (1653) and the Battle of Scheveningen (1653). At the Stuart Restoration in 1660, the Triumph was transferred into the new Royal Navy. During the Second Anglo-Dutch War she participated in the Battle of Lowestoft in 1665, the Four Days' Battle in 1666 and the St James' Day Fight in 1666. During the Third Anglo-Dutch War she took part in the Battle of Solebay in 1672, and in the two Battles of Schooneveld and the Battle of Texel in 1673. The Triumph was sold out of the navy in 1688.
