= Robert Sansum =

British Royal Navy vice admiral

Vice-Admiral Robert Sansum
- Died: 1665
- Occupation: Royal Navy vice-admiral

Robert Sansum (died 1665) was a British Royal Navy vice-admiral.

== Biography ==
Sansum was in 1649 master, and apparently owner, of the ship Alexander of 160 tons, which on 28 June was hired for the service of the state at 130l. a month, Sansum remaining in command of her. In 1652 he commanded the Bryer, attending on the army in Scotland, and in January 1652–3, off Newcastle, captured a Flushing man-of-war of 15 guns, which he brought into the Tyne, and which was afterwards fitted for the state's service. It was at this time that a charge was laid against him of conniving at his men selling some of the ship's stores and victuals, but it seems to have been put on one side as unfounded and malicious. In June 1653 he brought into the Downs three French ships laden with tar and hemp, and in May 1654, being then in the Adventure, he took three more, on their way from Havre to Rochelle. In April 1655 he was appointed to the Portsmouth, which he commanded continuously for the next five or six years, for the protection of trade in the North Sea, though on one occasion, in the end of 1658, he stretched as far as the Canaries, and convoyed home a number of merchant vessels. In the summer of 1659 he was with the fleet off Elsinore. After the Restoration he continued serving, and in 1664 was appointed rear-admiral of the white squadron, commanded by Prince Rupert. In the following year he was still rear-admiral of the white squadron, with his flag in the Resolution, and was killed in the Battle of Lowestoft on 3 June. A grant of 500l. was ordered to be paid to his widow, Mary Sansum; but it does not appear that she received it (cf. Cal. State Papers, Dom. 1666–7 p. 406, 1667–8 p. 140). Whether Sansum left issue is not stated; but the name remained continuously in the navy list well past the middle of this century.
