= Battle of Plymouth (1652) =

1652 naval battle of the Anglo-Dutch War

Coordinates: 49.964°N 4.210°W

- Part of First Anglo-Dutch War
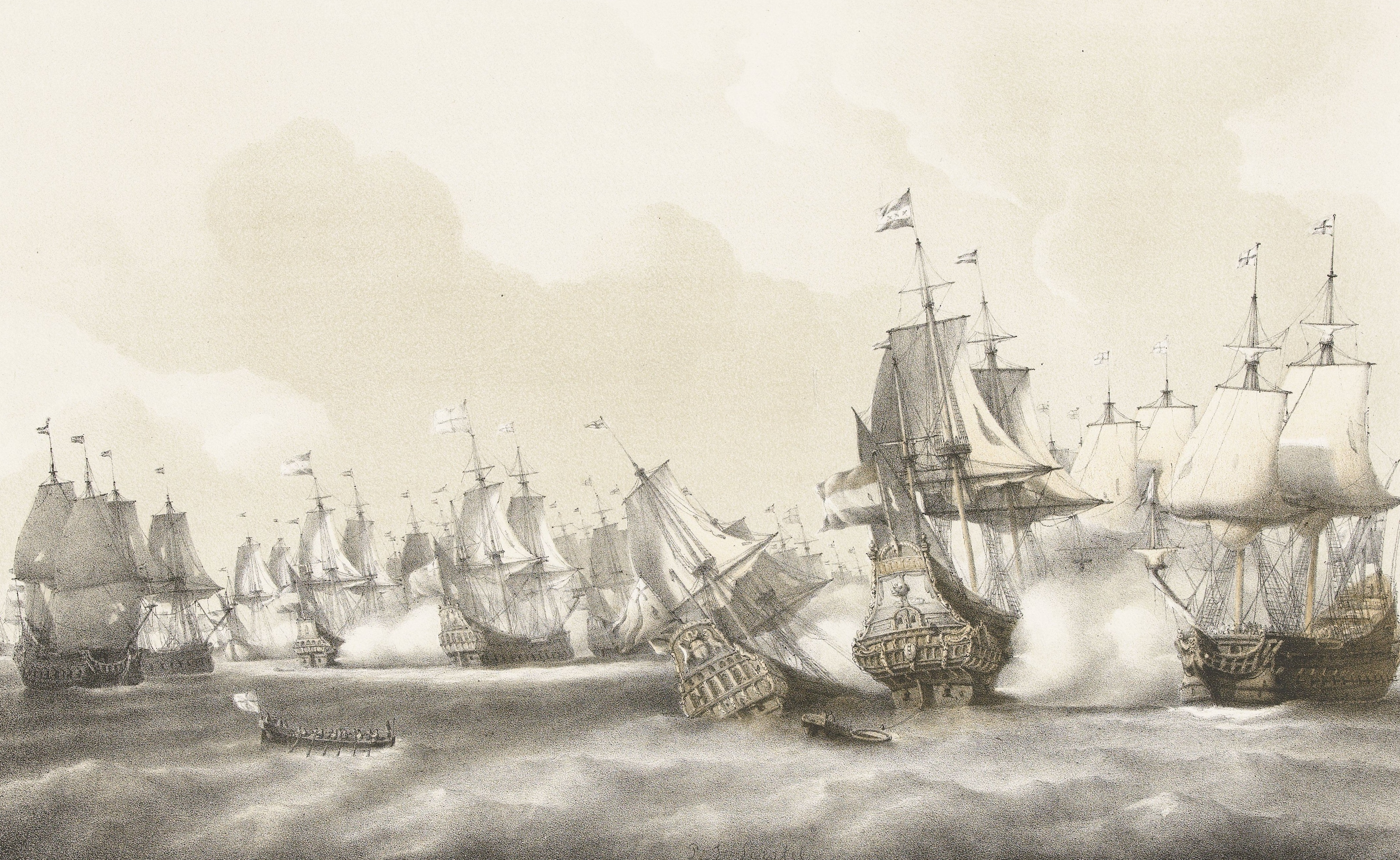
- Dutch print of the battle
Date	16 August 1652
Location	Off Plymouth, English Channel
Result	Dutch victory

Belligerents
Dutch Republic	Commonwealth of England

Commanders and leaders
(Dutch Republic) Michiel de Ruyter	(Commonwealth of England) George Ayscue

Strength
22 warships 6 fire ships 900 guns 3,300 men	38 warships 4 frigates 4 fire ships 1,100 guns 4,300 men

Casualties and losses
50–60 killed 40–50 wounded	~31 killed ~60 wounded

The Battle of Plymouth was a naval battle in the First Anglo-Dutch War. It took place on 16 August 1652 (26 August 1652 (Gregorian calendar) (Note: During this period in English history dates of events are usually recorded in the Julian calendar, while those the Netherlands are recorded in the Gregorian calendar. In this article dates are in the Julian calendar with the start of the year adjusted to 1 January (see Old Style and New Style dates).) and was a short battle, but had the unexpected outcome of a Dutch victory over England. General-at-Sea George Ayscue of the Commonwealth of England attacked an outward bound convoy of the Dutch Republic commanded by Vice-Commodore Michiel de Ruyter. The two commanders had been personal friends before the war. The Dutch were able to force Ayscue to break off the engagement, and the Dutch convoy sailed safely to the Atlantic while Ayscue sailed to Plymouth for repairs.

== Background ==
On 19 July De Ruyter was appointed Vice-Commodore, an originally Dutch creation between Captain and Rear-Admiral, with the confederate Dutch fleet and shortly after took over command, in the absence of Vice-Admiral Witte de With, of a squadron assembling in the Wielingen, off the coast of Zealand, to escort a large convoy. Around 10 August, De Ruyter took sea before the merchantmen had arrived, to seek out an English fleet of forty ships, commanded by Ayscue, which he knew had left The Downs on 19 July. De Ruyter's squadron at that moment consisted of 23 warships and six fireships, with a total of about 600 cannon and 1,700 men. As De Ruyter reported to the States-General of the Netherlands, most crews were badly trained, many ships poorly maintained and he had just two months of supplies. Nevertheless, he preferred to give battle early without the burden of having to protect the convoy.

Reaching the English Channel, he soon discovered that Ayscue was not interested in fighting the Dutch squadron, but avoided it in the hope of intercepting the convoy. To lure Ayscue out De Ruyter started to cruise off the coast of Sussex, causing an uproar with the local population, but Ayscue, despite his fleet having grown to 42 ships, did not react. Meanwhile, De Ruyter had lost two ships, sent out to escort a single incoming merchantman to the mouth of the Somme river, when they collided, sinking one, the Sint Nicolaes, and severely damaging the other, Gelderlandt.

On 11 August De Ruyter at last did rendezvous with the convoy of sixty merchantmen off Gravelines in the southern North Sea. He was pleased to notice that it brought ten warships with it, bringing his total to 31. On 13 August De Ruyter re-entered the Channel near Calais. His instructions were to escort the convoy to the Atlantic. There most ships would head for the Mediterranean together with their ten escorts, while the original squadron would have to wait to pick up merchantmen coming from the West Indies and transporting silver. Ayscue's fleet had then grown to 47 vessels: 38 men-of-war, among which armed merchantmen; five fireships, and four smaller vessels.

== Battle ==
On 15 August, the English spotted the Dutch fleet off the coast of Plymouth and took sea. Ayscue attempted a direct attack from the north the next day, off the coast of Brittany around 13:30, against the convoy, having the weather gauge. He hoped it would scatter, allowing him to capture some very profitable prizes, but De Ruyter unexpectedly separated his naval squadron and changed course to meet Ayscue's attack, shielding the merchantmen. Ayscue's ships were on average more heavily armed, but extremely disorganised because the fastest vessels, among them Ayscue's flagship the George and the Vanguard of his vice-admiral William Haddock, had broken formation in the hope of catching, during a running battle, straggling Dutch merchantmen. They were now unable to form a line of battle and fully exploit their advantage in firepower over the Dutch. The Dutch squadron however, sailing to the northwest, was in a rough defensive leeward line formation, with the Frisian acting Rear-Admiral Joris Pieterszoon van den Broeck commanding the van, De Ruyter himself commanding the centre and Dutch Rear-Admiral Jan Aertsen Verhoeff commanding the rear. Around 16:00 the Dutch fleet and seven forward English vessels met and almost immediately passed through each other, both sides afterwards claiming to have "broken the enemy line". Having thus gained the weather gauge the Dutch at once exploited this by turning and attacking from the north. They would describe this as a second breaking of the line but probably the battle soon degenerated into a confusing mêlée. With their best ships now surrounded by the mass of Dutch vessels and bearing the brunt of the fight, the slower remainder of the English fleet, largely consisting of poorly trained hired merchantmen, was, reaching the scene of the battle, not overly zealous to get involved. Their numerical superiority thus also gained the English little.

The largest Dutch vessel, the Dutch East India Company warship Vogelstruys, by Dutch standards heavily armed with a lower tier of 18-pounders, got separated from the rest of the Dutch fleet and was attacked by three English ships at once and boarded. Her crew was close to surrendering when her captain, the Frisian Douwe Aukes, threatened to blow her up first. Faced with this alternative the crew rallied, drove off the English boarding team and put up such a fight that the English vessels, much damaged and two even in a sinking condition, broke off the attack. The Dutch employed their tactic of disabling enemy vessels by firing at their masts and rigging with chain shot. At the end of the afternoon Ayscue, feeling rather unsupported, decided to break off the unsuccessful engagement and to retreat to Plymouth to repair his ships before any became so damaged they would be captured. The Bonaventure could only disengage after an English fireship, the Charity commanded by Captain Simon Orton, set itself alight and frightened off the attacking Dutch vessels. De Ruyter in his journal concluded:

If our fireships had been with us – they remained leeward – we would with the help of God have routed the enemy; but praised be God who has blessed us in that our enemy fled by himself, though 45 sails strong and of great force.

Neither side lost a warship, but both sides suffered heavy casualties among their crews. The Dutch had about sixty dead and fifty wounded. The reports on the English losses differ: one set the number as high as seven hundred casualties including the wounded (most from the failed attack on the Vogelstruys), another mentioned 91 dead, among them Ayscue's flag captain Thomas Lisle. Rear-Admiral Michael Pack had a leg amputated and shortly afterwards died of the complications. The English spent one fireship.

De Ruyter pursued the English fleet after its retreat. On the morning of the next day both forces transpired to be still close to each other and he hoped by aggressively pursuing to capture some stragglers. Several English ships were in tow and might well be abandoned if he pressed hard enough. However, Ayscue, fearing for his reputation, on 17 August convinced the English council of war to again give battle if necessary and brought his entire force safely back to Plymouth on 18 August. De Ruyter then sent two warships to escort the merchant fleet through the Channel to the Atlantic. For a while he considered trying to attack the enemy fleet at anchorage in Plymouth Sound, but in the end decided against it as he did not have the weather gauge. Then hearing that General-at-Sea Robert Blake was sailing to the west with a superior force of 72, he chose to withdraw to the west and kept assembling incoming West Indies ships throughout September. On 15 September Blake had reached Portland and sent out a squadron of eighteen sail commanded by William Penn to intercept De Ruyter, but the latter escaped east along the French coast while Blake had been forced by a storm to seek shelter in Torbay. De Ruyter escorted twelve merchantmen safely to Calais on 22 September (2 October Gregorian calendar) when his supplies had nearly run out. Shortly afterwards nine or ten of the Dutch ships, among them De Ruyter's flagship the Kleine Neptunis, then had to return to port for repairs, probably because of insufficiently repaired damage from the battle.

== Aftermath ==
The English ships had expected to easily defeat the Dutch in a set battle because of their superiority in armament and numbers. While the failure came as an unpleasant surprise to the English, the Dutch populace rejoiced in the tactical draw, hailing De Ruyter, who had not been well known among the larger public, as a naval hero. The English accused some merchantmen captains of cowardice. Ayscue was blamed for poor leadership and organisation: his attempt to present the encounter as a victory failed to convince. He lost command after this battle, though probably for political reasons: he had known royalist sympathies. Less important was his emphasis on capturing prizes while avoiding battle. In the first year of the war this was a very common attitude, the English mainly seeing the conflict as one large privateering campaign, allowing them to gain riches at the expense of the Dutch; only with the Battle of the Gabbard would they really try to establish naval dominion.

This victory was very important to the naval career of De Ruyter: it was the first time he commanded an independent force as a fleet commander. Before, he only had had subcommand of a flotilla aiding Portugal in 1641. As a result of the battle he acquired the nickname The Sea Lion. Before he could return home, De Ruyter was first involved in the Battle of the Kentish Knock but arriving in Middelburg he was received by the States of Zealand and rewarded with a golden honorary chain of a hundred Flemish pounds for both battles because he in the first had shown "masculine courage" and in the second "courageous prudence" – having convinced Witte de With to a timely retreat.

== Ships involved ==
No full list exists, and especially the English order of battle is poorly known; the following are lists of known participants, with the Dutch list being the one still extant and containing the names of the original 23 warships and six fireships, with which De Ruyter sailed from the Wielingen

=== United Provinces ===
Ship name	Commander	Guns	Notes
Vogelstruys	Douwe Aukes	40	VOC-ship
Vrede	Pieter Salomonszoon	40	VOC-ship
Haes in't Veldt	Leendert den Haen	30	Zealand directory ship
Sint Nicolaes	Andries van den Boeckhorst	23	Admiralty of Friesland; sunk in earlier Somme collision
Liefde	Joost Banckert de Jonge	26	Admiralty of Zeeland
Kleine Neptunis	Michiel de Ruyter	28	Admiralty of Zeeland; flag captain Jan Pauwelszoon
Albertina	Rombout van der Parre	24	Admiralty of Friesland
Sint Pieter	Jan Janszoon van der Valck	28	Admiralty of the Maze
Westergo	Joris Pieterszoon van den Broecke	28	Admiralty of Friesland; second in command
Engel Michiel	Emmanuel Zalingen	40	Admiralty of Amsterdam
Drie Coningen	Lucas Albertszoon	38	Admiralty of Amsterdam
Gelderland	Cornelis van Velsen	28	Admiralty of the Maze; damaged in Somme collision
Graaf Hendrik	Jan Reynderszoon Wagenaer	30	Admiralty of Friesland
Wapen van Swieten	Jacob Sichelszoon	28	Admiralty of Zeeland
Kasteel van Medemblick	Gabriel Antheunissen	26	Admiralty of the Noorderkwartier
Westcapelle	Cleas Janszoon Sanger	26	Admiralty of Zeeland
Eendraght	Andries Fortuijn	24	Admiralty of the Maze
Amsterdam	Simon van der Aeck	36	Admiralty of Amsterdam
Faeme	Cornelis Loncke	36	Admiralty of Zeeland
Schaepherder	Albert Pieterszoon Quaboer	28	Admiralty of Friesland
Sara	Hans Karelszoon Becke	24	Admiralty of Friesland
Hector van Troijen	Reinier Sekema	24	Admiralty of Friesland
Rotterdam	Jan Aertszoon Verhaeff	26	Admiralty of the Maze; third in command
Hoop	Thomas Janszoon Dijck		Admiralty of Amsterdam; fireship
Amsterdam	Jan Overbeecke		Admiralty of Amsterdam; fireship
Gekroonde Liefde	Jacob Hermanszoon Visser		Admiralty of Zeeland; fireship
Orangieboom	Leendert Arendszoon de Jager		Admiralty of the Maze; fireship
Sinte Maria	Jan Cleaszoon Corff		Admiralty of Amsterdam; fireship
Goude Saele	Cornelis Beecke		Admiralty of Amsterdam; fireship

=== England (George Ayscue) ===
- George 52 (flag)
- Amity 36 (Rear-Admiral Michael Pack)
- Success 30 (merchantman)
- Ruth 30 (merchantman)
- Brazil frigate 24 (merchantman)
- Malaga Merchant 30 (merchantman)
- Increase 39 (merchantman, Thomas Varvell)
- Vanguard 46 (Vice-Admiral William Haddock)
- Success 36 (William Kendall)
- Pelican 42 (Joseph Jordan)
- Pearl 24 (Roger Cuttance)
- John and Elizabeth* 26 (merchantman)
- George Bonaventure* 20 (merchantman, John Crampe)
- Anthony Bonaventure 36 (merchantman, Walter Hoxon)
- Unity (merchantman)
- Maidenhead 36 (merchantman)
- Constant Anne (ketch)
- Bachelor (ketch)
- Charity (fireship, Simon Orton) – Expended

Ships marked * are probables.

== Sources ==
- Blok, P.J. (1928). Michiel de Ruyter (PDF) (in Dutch). Martinus Nijhof.
