= English ship Vanguard (1631) =

Ship of the line of the Royal Navy

History

England
- Name: Vanguard
- Ordered: 29 October 1630
- Builder: Phineas Pett, Woolwich Dockyard
- Launched: 21 April 1631
- Fate: Sunk as a blockship in the Upper Medway, 12 June 1667

General characteristics
- Tons burthen: 751 tons
- Length: 112 ft (34 m) (keel length)
- Beam: 36 ft 4 in (11.07 m); by 1660 38 ft 0 in (11.58 m)
- Draught: 17 ft 0 in (5.18 m)
- Depth of hold: 13 ft 10 in (4.22 m)
- Propulsion: Sails
- Complement: 390 officers and men
- Armament: 40 guns (1642); 56 guns (1660)

Vanguard was a 40-gun ship of the English Navy Royal, built by Phineas Pett and launched in 1631 at Woolwich Dockyard, and was the second vessel to bear the name. Officially she was rebuilt from the first Vanguard, but likely only shared some of the timber and fittings from the previous ship. In 1649, she became part of the Navy of the English Commonwealth, and in this capacity she served in the First Anglo-Dutch War, taking part in Sir George Ayscue's Action on 16 August 1652 (under Vice-Admiral William Haddock), the Battle of the Kentish Knock on 28 September 1652, the Battle of Portland on 18 February 1653 (as flagship of General-at-Sea George Monck), and as flagship of Vice-Admiral Joseph Jordan at both the Battle of the Gabbard on 2-3 June 1653 and the Battle of Scheveningen on 31 July 1653. In May 1660 she was taken into the new Royal Navy formed at the Stuart Restoration, becoming HMS Vanguard, by when her armament had been increased to 56 guns.

She took part in the Second Anglo-Dutch War, when she fought in several actions of the Second Dutch War, including the Battle of Lowestoft in 1665 and the Four Days' Battle and St James's Day Fight in 1666. On 12 June 1667 the decommissioned Vanguard was scuttled to form a barrier in the River Medway to prevent the Dutch fleet from capturing or burning the British ships there. Her wreck was subsequently sold on 7 February 1668.
