= English ship Guinea =

38-gun fourth rate vessel

History

Royalist Navy
- Name: Charles
- Commissioned: 1648
- Captured: 25 April 1649
- Fate: Incorporated into Parliament Navy

Commonwealth of England
- Name: Guinea
- Acquired: 25 April 1649
- Commissioned: 1649
- Honours and awards: Kentish Knock 1652; Portland 1653; Gabbard 1653

England
- Name: Guinea
- Acquired: 25 April 1649
- Commissioned: 1649
- Honours and awards: Lowestoft 1665; Vagen 1665; Orfordness 1667
- Fate: Sold 27 November 1667

General characteristics
- Class & type: 30-gun fourth rate
- Tons burthen: 375 30/94 bm
- Length: 90 ft 0 in (27.4 m) keel for tonnage
- Beam: 28 ft 0 in (8.5 m)
- Draught: 15 ft 0 in (4.6 m)
- Depth of hold: 11 ft 4 in (3.5 m)
- Sail plan: ship-rigged
- Complement: 140 in 1652; 150/120/100 in 1653
- Armament: 30 guns initially; 34 by 1653; 38/32 in 1666; 10 × culverins; 10 × demi-culverins; 18 × sakers

Guinea was a 38-gun fourth rate vessel of the Kingdom of England, Her initial commission was as a Royalist vessel during the English Civil War named Charles. She was captured then commissioned into the Parliamentary Naval Force as Guinea. During the First Anglo-Dutch War she partook in the Battle of Kentish Knock, the Battle of Portland and the Battle of The Gabbard. During the Second Anglo-Dutch War she participated in the Battle of Lowestoft, the Battle of Vagen and the St James Day Fight. She was sold on 27 November 1667.

Guinea was the only named vessel in the English or Royal Navy.

Charles was the fourth named vessel since it was used for a 16-gun pinnace, built at Woolwich and sold in 1616.

== Specifications ==
She was purchased by the Royalists in 1648, then captured by the Parliamentarians in 1649. Her dimensions were 90 feet 0 inches (27.4 metres) keel for tonnage with a breadth of 28 feet 0 inches (8.5 metres) and a depth of hold of 11 feet 4 inches (3.5 metres). Her builder's measure tonnage was calculated as 375 30/94 tons. Her draught was 15 feet 0 inches (4.6 metres).

Her gun armament in 1648 was 38 guns. When captured she was equipped with 30 guns then increased to 34 guns by 1653. In 1666 her armament was 38 (wartime)/32 (peacetime) and consisted of ten culverins, (Note: The culverin was a gun of 4,500 pounds with a 5.5-inch bore firing a 17.5-pound shot with a twelve-pound powder charge) ten demi-culverines, (Note: The demi-culverin was a gun of 3,400 pounds with a four-inch bore firing a 9.5-pound shot with an eight-pound powder charge) eighteen sakers. (Note: The sacar or saker was a gun of 1,400 pounds with a 3.5-inch bore firing a 5.5-pound shot with a 5.5-pound powder charge) Her manning was 140 personnel and rose to 150/120/100 personnel.

== Commissioned service ==
=== Service in the English Civil War and Commonwealth Navy ===
She was commissioned as Charles into Royalist Navy under Captain Thomas Allin in 1648 to serve with Prince Rupert's squadron at Kinsale, Ireland. She was captured in Irish Waters on 25 April 1649 by Constant Warwick and Leopard. On 4 May 1649 she was ordered to be taken into the Parliamentary Naval Force. She was commissioned as Guinea into the Parliamentary Navy in 1649 under the command of Captain Thomas Thorowgood for the blockade of Kinsale. In 1650 she was under Captain Walter Wood for service on the Irish coast. She sailed with Penn's squadron to the Azores on 30 November 1650 then she went on to the Mediterranean. She was involved in the Scilly operations in 1651. Later in 1651 under the command of Captain Edmund Curtis she sailed to Virginia.

==== First Anglo-Dutch War ====
During the First Anglo-Dutch War she partook in the Battle of Kentish Knock as a member of Robert Blake's Fleet on 28 September 1652. She followed that with the Battle of Portland on 18 February 1653. As a member of Red Squadron, Rear Division she took part in the Battle of the Gabbard on 2–3 June 1653. On 31 July 1653 she participated in the Battle of Scheveningen off Texel as a member Red Squadron, Rear Division. She spent the winter of 1653/54 under the command of Captain George Acklam at Portsmouth.

In 1654 she came under the command of Jonathan Barnes followed by Captain Giles Shelley in 1656 for service with Robert Blakes Fleet until July 1656 then spent time in the English Channel. Captain Jeffrey Pearce was her commander in 1658. She was repaired at Portsmouth under the guidance of Master Shipwright John Tippetts for £646 (Note: The cost accounting for inflation of approximately £122,500 in reference to today.) between September 1659 and April 1660.

=== Service after the Restoration May 1660 ===
Captain Hugh Hide was in command from 26 February 1664 to 30 January 1665, during which time it participated in the surrender of New Amsterdam. Captain Andrew Ashford took over the next day on 31 January and held command until 26 February 1665.

==== Second Anglo-Dutch War ====
On 19 May 1665 Captain James Ableson took command. She was at the Battle of Lowestoft as a member of Red Squadron, Van Division on 3 June 1665. Captain Ableson was killed during the battle. On 11 June 1665 Captain Joseph Sanders took command. She was at the Battle of Vagen (at Bergen, Norway) on 3 August 1665. On 8 August 1665 she was under the command of Captain Thomas Roome Coyle. She was in action during 3/4 September 1665. Captain William Coleman relieved Captain Coyle on 2 June 1666 and he in turn was relieved of command on 12 June 1666 by Captain Arthur Ashby. She was at the Battle of Orfordness as a member of White Squadron, Van Division on 25 July 1666 where Ashby was mortally wounded, dying on 15 August.

On 16 August 1666 she was under Captain Sir John Berry for an expedition to Lisbon. Captain William Davis took command on 2 November 1666 and died 21 November 1666. She was paid off in November 1667.

== Disposition ==
Guinea was sold on 27 November 1667.
