= English ship Sapphire (1651) =

Ship of the line of the Royal Navy

History

Commonwealth of England
- Name: Sapphire
- Builder: Peter Pett I, Ratcliffe
- Launched: 1651
- Commissioned: 1651
- Honours and awards: Kentish Knock 1652; Dungeness 1652; Portland 1653; The Gabbard 1653; Scheveningen 1653

England
- Name: Sapphire
- Acquired: May 1660
- Fate: Run ashore to evade capture on 31 March 1670

General characteristics
- Class & type: 38-gun Fourth-rate
- Tons burthen: 442 20/94 tons bm
- Length: 100 ft 0 in (30.5 m) keel for tonnage
- Beam: 28 ft 10 in (8.8 m)
- Depth of hold: 14 ft 5 in (4.4 m)
- Sail plan: ship-rigged
- Complement: 140 in 1653; 160/130/90 in 1666
- Armament: 38 guns in 1653; 40 guns under 1666 Establishment; 12 × culverins; 10 × demi-culverins; 14 × sakers; 4 × 3-pounder guns; 36/30 guns in 1670

Sapphire was a 38-gun fourth-rate of the Commonwealth of England. After commissioning she was actively involved in the First Anglo-Dutch War, participating in most major fleet actions. During the Second Anglo-Dutch War, she was only in the first two engagements then spent her time in Irish Waters and the Mediterranean. She was run ashore due to a pending attack by suspected Algerian pirates on Sicily in March 1670.

Sapphire was the first named vessel in the English and Royal Navy.

== Construction and specifications ==
She was ordered by Parliament in 1651 to be built under contract by Peter Pett I at Ratcliffe. Her dimensions were 100 feet 0 inches (30.5 metres) keel for tonnage with a breadth of 28 feet 10 inches (8.8 metres) and a depth of hold of 14 feet 5 inches (4.4 metres). Her builder's measure tonnage was 442 20/94 tons.

Her gun armament in 1653 was 38 guns. By 1666 her guns were nominally increased to 40 guns. Her guns would consist of twelve culverins, (Note: The culverin was a gun of 4,500 pounds with a 5.5-inch bore firing a 17.5-pound shot with a twelve-pound powder charge) on the lower deck with ten demi-culverins, (Note: The demi-culverin was a gun of 3,400 pounds with a four-inch bore firing a 9.5-pound shot with an eight-pound powder charge) on the upper deck and fourteen sakers. (Note: The sacar or saker was a gun of 1,400 pounds with a 3.5-inch bore firing a 5.5-pound shot with a 5.5-pound powder charge) on the quarterdeck. She actually carried 44 guns consisting of six culverins, sixteen demi-culverins eighteen sakers and four 3-pounder guns. Her manning was 140 personnel in 1653 and her established manning in 1666 was 160/130/90 personnel.

She was completed with a first cost of £2,873 (Note: The cost accounting for inflation of approximately £451,300 in reference to today.) or 442 tons @ £6.10.0d (Note: The cost accounting for inflation of approximately £1,000 in reference to today.) per ton.

== Commissioned service ==
=== Service in the Commonwealth Navy ===
She was commissioned in 1651 under the Command of Captain Robert Moulton. She was with Robert Blake's Fleet in Rye Bay and sortied for the Battle of Dover on 19 May 1652. She followed this by accompanying Robert Blake's Squadron into the Battle of Dungeness on 29 November 1652. Late in 1653 she came under the command of Captain William Hill. She was with Robert Blake's Fleet at the Battle of Portland on 18 February 1653. Following the battle she came under the command of Captain Nicholas Heaton. As a member of Red Squadron, Center Division she participated in the Battle of the Gabbard on 2–3 June 1653. On 31 July 1653 she was at the Battle of Scheveningen near Texel as a member of Red Squadron, Center Division. She was at Portsmouth for the winter of 1653/54. In 1655 Captain Richard was her commander sailing with Robert Blake's Fleet until July 1656. She rejoined Blake in the autumn and participated in the Battle of Santa Cruz on 20 April 1657.

=== Service after the Restoration May 1660 ===
She was in the Western Approaches in June 1660. On 23 November 1661 she was under command of Captain Samuel Titsell until 23 May 1663. on 29 October 1664 Captain Henry Clyde took command. As a member of Red Squadron Rear Division she participated in the Battle of Lowestoft on 3 June 1665. With the death of Captain Hyde on 11 June 1665 she came under command of Captain Thomas Elliot. She partook in the Battle of Vagen (Bergen, Norway) on 2 August 1665 losing 15 killed and 41 wounded. On 7 December 1665 Captain Jasper Grant took command from Captain Elliot for service on the Irish coast between June and July 1666. On 28 January she came under the command of Captain Sir William Jennings until 7 December 1668. On 30 October 1669 Captain John Pearse took command for the Mediterranean.

== Loss ==
Sapphire escorted merchant ships travelling from Sicily to Venice to protect them from pirate attacks. Sapphire was wrecked on 31 March 1670 when she was deliberately run aground at Sicily to escape from what her captain, John Pearce, thought were four pirate ships from Algeria. "Entirely losing his head," Sir William Laird Clowes would write later, "and paying no attention to the remonstrances of the master and of the whole of the ship's company, he ran the Sapphire ashore, in order, as he supposed, to save her from capture. She became a total wreck. If the strangers had really been Algerines his conduct would have been indefensible, but, as they proved to be friends, it was, in addition, contemptible." Pearce and his lieutenant, Andrew Logan, "who had abetted him in his foolish cowardice" were court-martialed on the Royal Navy yacht Bezan and, on 17 September 1670, were shot for cowardice.
