= HMS Revenge =

Thirteen warships of the Royal Navy have been named HMS Revenge:

- English ship Revenge (1577) was a 46-gun galleon launched in 1577. She fought the Spanish Armada in 1588, and was captured by a Spanish fleet in 1591. She sank while being sailed back to Spain.
- English ship Revenge (1650) was a 42-gun ship, previously a merchantman, purchased in 1650 by the Royalists. Her crew deserted to the Parliamentarians in 1652, bringing the ship with them. She was renamed Marmaduke, and was sunk in 1667 as a blockship.
- HMS Revenge (1660) was a 58-gun third rate launched in 1654 as Newbury, during the Commonwealth. She was renamed Revenge at the Restoration, and was condemned in 1678.
- HMS Revenge (1699) was 70-gun third rate launched in 1699, and renamed Buckingham in 1711 before being hulked in 1727. She was subsequently sunk as a foundation in 1745.
- HMS Revenge was a 70-gun third rate ship of the line launched in 1673 as HMS Swiftsure, and renamed HMS Revenge in 1716. She was rebuilt three times and was sold in 1787.
- HMS Revenge (1741) was a sloop commanded by Benjamin Norton for privateering in the British colonies.
- HMS Revenge (1778) was a 14-gun brig-sloop in service in 1778 and captured by the Americans in 1779.
- HMS Revenge (1796) was an 8-gun cutter purchased in 1796 and listed until 1798.
- HMS Revenge (1805) was a 74-gun third rate launched in 1805 and broken up in 1849.
- HMS Revenge (1859) was a 91-gun screw powered second rate launched in 1859. She was used as a base ship from 1872, became a training ship and was renamed Empress in 1891, and was sold for breaking up in 1923.
- HMS Revenge (1892) was a Royal Sovereign-class battleship launched in 1892. She was renamed HMS Redoubtable in 1915 and was broken up in 1919.
- HMS Revenge (06) was a Revenge-class battleship, laid down as HMS Renown, but renamed in 1913, prior to her launch in 1915. She was on harbour service from 1945 and was scrapped in 1948.
- HMS Revenge (S27) was a Resolution-class submarine launched in 1968 and laid up in 1995.

== Also ==
- HCS Revenge (1755) was a 16, or 28-gun ship that the Bombay Dockyard launched in 1755 for the Bombay Marine, the naval arm of the British East India Company. Revenge foundered in 1782 off Bombay in a storm.
- Revenge was a gunboat that the garrison at Gibraltar launched in June 1782 during the Great Siege of Gibraltar. She was one of 12. Each was armed with an 18-pounder gun, and received a crew of 21 men drawn from Royal Navy vessels stationed at Gibraltar. Brilliant provided Revenge's crew.

== Battle honours ==
Ships named Revenge have earned the following battle honours:

- Armada, 1588
- Azores, 1591
- Lowestoft, 1665
- Four Days' Battle, 1666
- Orfordness, 1666
- Bugia, 1671
- Schooneveld, 1673
- Marbella, 1705
- Orphee, 1758
- Quiberon Bay, 1759
- Trafalgar, 1805
- Basque Roads, 1809
- Belgian Coast, 1914−15
- Jutland, 1916
- Atlantic, 1939−41
- English Channel, 1940
