= English ship Convertine (1650) =

English naval vessel

History

Commonwealth of England
- Name: Convertine
- Acquired: October 1650
- Commissioned: 1651
- Honours and awards: Dungeness 1652; Portland 1653; Gabbard 1653

England
- Name: Convertine
- Acquired: October 1650
- Commissioned: 1651
- Honours and awards: Four Days' Battle 1666
- Captured: 4 June 1666
- Fate: Taken by two Dutch warships at the Four Days' Battle

General characteristics
- Class & type: 38-gun fourth rate
- Tons burthen: 375 30/94 bm
- Length: 90 ft 0 in (27.4 m) keel for tonnage
- Beam: 28 ft 0 in (8.5 m)
- Draught: 15 ft 0 in (4.6 m)
- Depth of hold: 12 ft 0 in (3.7 m)
- Sail plan: ship-rigged
- Complement: 180 in March 1652; 210 in 1653; 190/140/110 later 1653
- Armament: 44 guns end of 1653; 40 guns in 1660; 52/44 1666 Establishment; 24 × culverins; 20 × 8-pounders; 8 × sakers

Convertine was a 36-gun fourth rate vessel captured from the Portuguese by the Commonwealth of England. She was commissioned into the Parliamentary Naval Force as Convertine. During the First Anglo-Dutch War she partook in the Battle of Dungeness, Battle of Portland and the Battle of the Gabbard. During the Second Anglo-Dutch War she participated in the Battle of Lowestoft and the Four Days' Battle. She was captured during the Four Days' Battle.

Convertine was the second named vessel since it was used for a 36-gun vessel named Destiny built at Woolwich in 1616 and renamed Convertine in 1620, captured by Royalist forces in 1648 and sold at Lisbon in 1650.

== Specifications ==
She was captured by Tiger in October 1650 in the Tagus River in Portugal. Her dimensions were 103 feet 0 inches (31.4 metres) keel for tonnage with a breadth of 30 feet 0 inches (9.1 metres) and a depth of hold of 13 feet 6 inches (4.1 metres). Her builder's measure tonnage was calculated as 493 8/94 tons. She was lengthened in 1653.

Her gun armament at the end of 1653 was 44 guns and had dropped to 40 guns by 1660. In 1666 her armament was 52 (wartime)/44 (peacetime) and consisted of twenty-four culverins, (Note: The culverin was a gun of 4,500 pounds with a 5.5-inch bore firing a 17.5-pound shot with a twelve-pound powder charge) twenty 8-pounder guns, (Note: The 8-pounder was a captured Dutch weapon that found no favour in British use) eight sakers. (Note: The sacar or saker was a gun of 1,400 pounds with a 3.5-inch bore firing a 5.5-pound shot with a 5.5-pound powder charge) Her manning was 180 personnel in March 1652 and rose to 210 personnel by the end of 1653 (becoming a Third Rate briefly) and was established as 190/140/110 personnel.

== Commissioned service ==
=== Service in the English Civil War and Commonwealth Navy ===
She was commissioned into the Parliamentary Navy in 1651 under the command of Captain Abraham Wheeler. Later in 1651 she was under Captain John Holden.

==== First Anglo-Dutch War ====
At the start of the First Anglo-Dutch War she partook in the Battle of Kentish Knock on 28 September 1652 followed by the Battle of Dungeness on 29 November 1652. Before the end of the year Captain John Lambert took command. In 1653 she was under the command of Captain Anthony Joyne was her commander. She partook in the Battle of Portland on 18 February 1653. As a member of Blue Squadron, Rear Division she took part in the Battle of the Gabbard on 2–3 June 1653. After being lengthened, she spent the winter 1653/54 at Harwich under the command of John Hayward. She then sailed with Penn's Fleet to the West Indies on 25 December 1654. She participated in the attack on San Domingo on 13 April 1655 Afterwards she was under the command of Thomas Wilks. She sailed for Jamaica in 1660.

=== Service after the Restoration May 1660 ===
After the Restoration she was under the command of Captain John Povey and sailed to the East Indies. Captain John Pearce took command on 8 September 1664.

==== Second Anglo-Dutch War ====
At the Battle of Lowestoft on 3 June 1665, she was a member of Red Squadron, Center Division. She arrived on 3 June 1666 as reinforcement for White Squadron Van Division at the Four Days' Battle.

== Loss ==
Convertine was captured by two Dutch warships on 4 June 1666, the last day of the Four Days' Battle.
