= Battle of the Gabbard =

1653 naval battle of the First Anglo-Dutch War

- Part of First Anglo-Dutch War
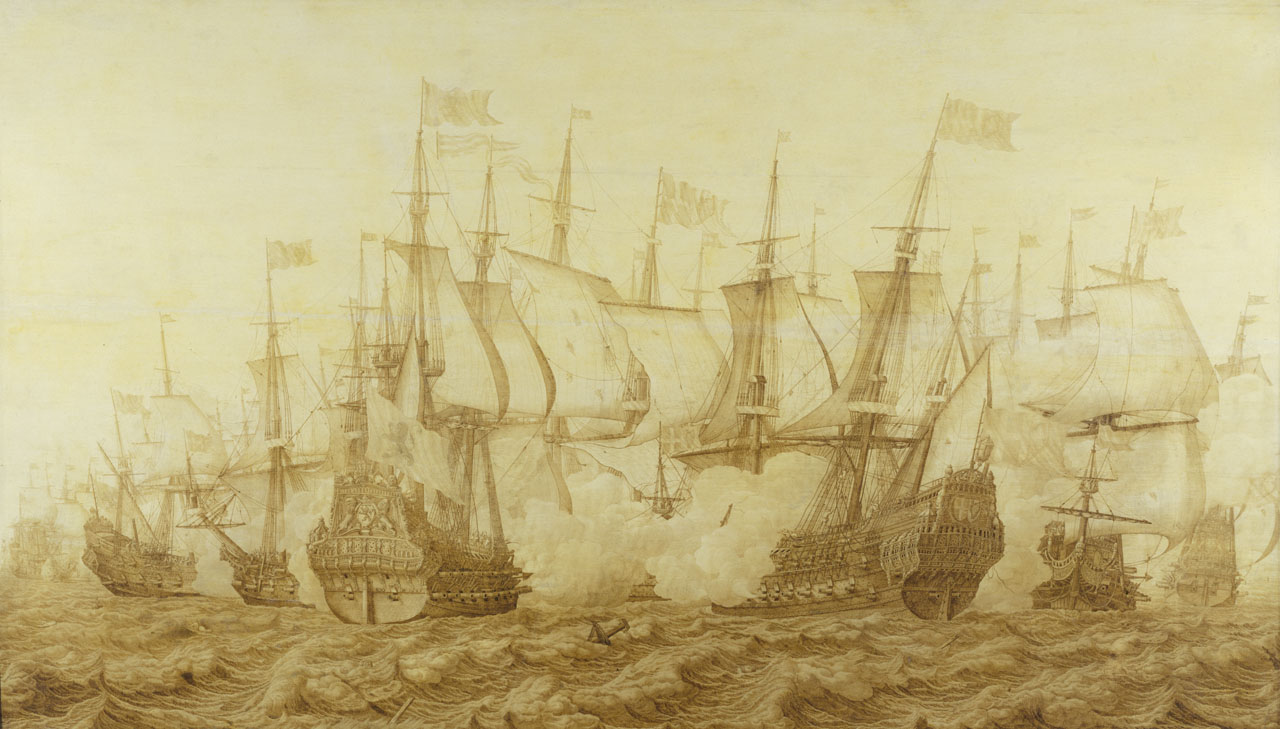
- The Battle of the Gabbard, 2 June 1653; Heerman Witmont
| Date | 2 to 3 June 1653 |
| Location | Gabbard Bank, offshore Suffolk, England 51.95°N 1.75°E |
| Result | English victory |

Belligerents
| Commonwealth of England | Dutch Republic |

Commanders and leaders
| George Monck; Richard Deane †; John Lawson; William Penn; Benjamin Blake | Maarten Tromp; Witte de With |

Strength
| 100 ships 3,800 guns 16,000 men | 98 ships 3,100 guns 11,500 men |

Casualties and losses
| 400 dead or wounded | 9 ships sunk, 11 captured 800 killed or wounded, 1,000 prisoners |

The Battle of the Gabbard, (Note: Dutch; Zeeslag bij Nieuwpoort, also known as the Battle of Gabbard Bank, the Battle of the North Foreland or the Second Battle of Nieuwpoort) was a naval battle fought from 2 to 3 June 1653 (Note: 12–13 June 1653 Gregorian calendar; During this period in English history dates of events are usually recorded in the Julian calendar, while those the Netherlands are recorded in the Gregorian calendar. In this article dates are in the Julian calendar with the start of the year adjusted to 1 January (see Old Style and New Style dates).) during the First Anglo-Dutch War. It took place near the Gabbard shoal off the coast of Suffolk, England, between fleets of the Commonwealth of England and the Dutch Republic. It resulted in a significant English victory.

== Battle ==
The English fleet had 100 ships commanded by Generals at Sea George Monck and Richard Deane and Admirals John Lawson and William Penn. The Dutch had 98 ships under Lieutenant-Admiral Maarten Tromp and Vice-admiral Witte de With, divided in five squadrons. On 2 June 1653 the Dutch attacked but were beaten back because the English employed line-of-battle tactics, making the Dutch pay a high price for attempting to board. The Dutch fleet, consisting of lighter ships, was severely damaged and lost two ships.

Tromp's fleet was organized mostly for mélée fighting. His ships were crewed with a much greater proportion of soldiers for that purpose than the English, whose methods employed the use of superior heavy guns and with musketry fire. That could overwhelm the enemy’s upper decks, with attention aimed at officers, followed up with grappling and boarding, with the objective of leaving relatively few crewmen below deck who would be committed to manning the cannons. Tromp also relied far more on the use of fireships to finish off damaged or inoperable ships, relying on his superior seamanship and experience to out- maneuver the English so as to concentrate his whole strength against a single division.

On 3 June the English were joined by Admiral Robert Blake, but Tromp decided to try again a direct attack though his ships were practically out of ammunition. A sudden lull however made his ships sitting ducks for the superior English guns. The Dutch were routed, the English chasing them until well in the evening, capturing many Dutch ships. The battle ended with the Dutch losing a total of twenty ships, of which nine were sunk and eleven captured. The English lost no ships, but Deane was killed. Tactically this was the worst defeat in Dutch naval history with the exception of the Battle of Lowestoft. Strategically the defeat threatened to be disastrous.

Battle of the Gabbard (1653)

The victory meant that the English control over the English Channel, regained by the Battle of Portland in March after it had been lost in the Battle of Dungeness, was now extended to the North Sea. After the battle, the English imposed a blockade on the Dutch coast, capturing many merchant ships and crippling the Dutch economy . The fleets met again on 29–31 July 1653 (8–10 August 1653 Gregorian calendar) at the Battle of Scheveningen.

Reports of the battle were read in London with great exclamation. The victorious battle was the first great naval action which England had fought since the reign of Elizabeth I.

== Ships involved ==
Squadrons

=== England ===
==== Red Squadron ====
| Ship | Guns | Men | Commander | Notes | Ref. |
|---|---|---|---|---|---|
| Resolution | 88 | 550 | General-at-Sea George Monck; General-at-Sea Richard Deane †; Captain John Bourne | | |
| Worcester | 50 | 220 | Captain George Dakins | | |
| Advice | 42 | 180 | Captain Jeremy Smyth | | |
| Diamond | 42 | 180 | Captain William Hill | | |
| Sapphire | 38 | 140 | Captain Nicholas Heaton | | |
| Marmaduke | 42 | 160 | Captain Edward Blagg | | |
| Pelican | 40 | 180 | Captain Peter Mootham | | |
| Mermaid | 26 | 100 | Captain John King | | |
| Golden Fleece | 44 | 180 | Captain Nicholas Forster | Hired armed merchantman | |
| Loyalty | 34 | 150 | Captain John Limbry | Hired armed merchantman | |
| Society | 44 | 140 | Captain Nicholas Lucas | Hired armed merchantman | |
| Malaga Merchant | 36 | 140 | Captain Henry Collins | Hired armed merchantman | |
| Martin | 14 | 90 | Captain John Vessy | | |
| Fortune | 10 | 30 | | Fireship | |
| Fox | 10 | 30 | | Fireship | |
| Renown | 10 | 30 | | Fireship | |
| Triumph | 62 | 350 | Vice-Admiral James Peacock; Captain Proud | | |
| Laurel | 48 | 200 | Captain John Stoakes | | |
| Adventure | 40 | 160 | Captain Robert Nixon | | |
| Providence | 33 | 140 | Captain John Peirce | | |
| Bear | 46 | 200 | Captain Francis Kirby | | |
| Heartsease | 36 | 150 | Captain Thomas Wright | | |
| Hound | 36 | 120 | Captain Jonah Hide | | |
| Anne and Joyce | 34 | 119 | Captain William Pile | Hired armed merchantman | |
| London | 40 | 200 | Captain Arthur Browne | | |
| Hannibal | 44 | 180 | Captain William Haddock | Hired armed merchantman | |
| Mary | 37 | 120 | Captain Henry Maddison | | |
| Thomas and William | 36 | 140 | Captain John Jefferson | Hired armed merchantman | |
| Speaker | 56 | 300 | Rear-Admiral Samuel Howett; Captain John Gibson | | |
| Sussex | 46 | 180 | Captain Roger Cuttance | | |
| Guinea | 34 | 150 | Captain Edmund Curtis | | |
| Tiger | 40 | 170 | Captain Gabriel Sanders | | |
| Violet | 40 | 180 | Captain Henry Southwood | | |
| Sophia | 38 | 160 | Captain Robert Kirby | | |
| Falmouth | 26 | 100 | Captain John Jeffreys | | |
| Four Sisters | 30 | 120 | Captain Robert Becke | Hired armed merchantman | |
| Hamburg Merchant | 34 | 110 | Captain William Jessel | Hired armed merchantman | |
| Phoenix | 34 | 120 | Captain Henry Eaden | | |

==== White Squadron ====
| Ship | Guns | Men | Commander | Notes | Ref. |
|---|---|---|---|---|---|
| James | 66 | 360 | Admiral William Penn; Captain John Gilson | | |
| Lion | 50 | 220 | Captain John Lambert | | |
| Ruby | 42 | 180 | Captain Robert Sanders | | |
| Assistance | 40 | 180 | Captain William Crispin | | |
| Foresight | 42 | 180 | Captain Richard Stayner | | |
| Portsmouth | 38 | 170 | Captain Robert Danford | | |
| Anne Piercy | 33 | 120 | Captain Thomas Ware | Hired armed merchantman | |
| Peter | 32 | 100 | Captain John Littleton | | |
| Exchange | 30 | 100 | Captain Henry Tedman | Hired armed merchantman | |
| Merlin | 12 | 90 | Captain George Crapnell | | |
| Richard and Martha | 46 | 180 | Captain Eustace Smith | Hired armed merchantman | |
| Sarah | 34 | 140 | Captain Francis Steward | Hired armed merchantman | |
| Lissa Merchant | 38 | 160 | Captain Simon Baily | Hired armed merchantman | |
| Fireship | 10 | 30 | | | |
| Victory | 60 | 300 | Vice-Admiral Lionel Lane | | |
| Centurion | 42 | 200 | Captain Walter Wood | | |
| Expedition | 32 | 140 | Captain Thomas Foules | | |
| Gillyflower | 32 | 120 | Captain John Hayward | | |
| Middelburg | 32 | 120 | Captain Thomas Withing | | |
| Raven | 38 | 140 | Captain Robert Taylor | | |
| Exchange | 32 | 120 | Captain Jeffery Dare | Hired armed merchantman | |
| Globe | 30 | 110 | Captain Robert Coleman | | |
| Prudent Mary | 28 | 100 | Captain John Taylor | Hired armed merchantman | |
| Thomas and Lucy | 34 | 125 | Captain Andrew Rand | Hired armed merchantman | |
| Andrew | 56 | 360 | Rear-Admiral Thomas Graves; Captain George Dakins | | |
| Assurance | 36 | 160 | Captain Phillip Holland | | |
| Crown | 36 | 140 | Captain Thompson | | |
| Duchess | 24 | 90 | Captain Richard Seafield | | |
| Princess Maria | 38 | 170 | Captain Seth Hawly | | |
| Waterhound | 30 | 120 | Captain Giles Shelly | | |
| Pearl | 26 | 100 | Captain James Cadman | | |
| Reformation | 40 | 160 | Captain Anthony Earning | | |
| Industry | 30 | 100 | Captain Ben Salmon | Hired armed merchantman | |

==== Blue Squadron ====
| Ship | Guns | Men | Commander | Notes | Ref. |
|---|---|---|---|---|---|
| George | 58 | 350 | Admiral John Lawson; Captain Peter Strong | | |
| Kentish | 50 | 180 | Captain Jacob Reynolds | | |
| Great President | 40 | 180 | Captain Francis Park | | |
| Nonsuch | 40 | 170 | Captain Thomas Penrose | | |
| Success | 38 | 150 | Captain William Kendall | | |
| Welcome | 40 | 200 | Captain John Harman | | |
| Oak | 32 | 120 | Captain John Edwin | | |
| Brazil | 30 | 120 | Captain Thomas Heath | Hired armed merchantman | |
| Eastland Merchant | 32 | 110 | Captain John Walters | Hired armed merchantman | |
| Adventure | 38 | 160 | Captain Edward Greene | Hired armed merchantman | |
| Samaritan | 30 | 120 | Captain Shadrach Blake | Hired armed merchantman | |
| Fireship | 10 | 30 | | | |
| Vanguard | 56 | 390 | Vice-Admiral Joseph Jordan | | |
| Happy Entrance | 43 | 200 | Captain Richard Newbery | | |
| Dragon | 38 | 260 | Captain John Seaman | | |
| Convert | 32 | 120 | Captain Philip Gethings | | |
| Paul | 38 | 120 | Captain Anthony Spatchurt | | |
| Gift | 34 | 130 | Captain Thomas Salmon | | |
| Crescent | 30 | 115 | Captain Thomas Thorowgood | | |
| Samuel Taboat | 30 | 110 | Captain Joseph Ames | Hired armed merchantman | |
| Benjamin | 32 | 120 | Hired armed merchantman | | |
| King Ferdinando | 36 | 140 | Captain Richard Paine | Hired armed merchantman | |
| Roebuck | 30 | 100 | Captain Henry Fenn | | |
| Rainbow | 58 | 300 | Rear-Admiral William Goodsonn | | |
| Convertine | 44 | 210 | Captain Anthony Joyn | | |
| Amity | 36 | 150 | Captain Henry Pack | | |
| Dolphin | 30 | 120 | Captain Robert Davis | | |
| Arms of Holland | 34 | 120 | Captain Francis Mardrig | | |
| Tulip | 32 | 120 | Captain Joseph Cubitt | | |
| Jonathan | 30 | 110 | Captain Robert Graves | Hired armed merchantman | |
| Dragoneare | 32 | 110 | Captain Edward Smith | Hired armed merchantman | |
| William and John | 36 | 120 | Captain Nathaniel Jesson | Hired armed merchantman | |
| Nicodemus | 12 | 40 | Captain William Ledgart | | |
| Blossom | 30 | 110 | Captain Nathaniel Cock | Hired armed merchantman | |

=== Netherlands ===
98 ships – of which 6 sunk and 11 captured

- Brederode, 54 (flagship of Admiral Tromp)

== See also ==
- HMS Gabbard of the British Royal Navy was named in honour of the battle.

== Sources ==
- Clowes, William Laird, Sir (1898). The Royal Navy, a history from the earliest times to the present. Vol. II. London: S. Low, Marston.
- Dixon, William Hepworth (1852). Robert Blake, admiral and general at sea. London: Chapman and Hall.
- Jones, James Rees (1996). The Anglo-Dutch wars of the seventeenth century. London; New York: Longman. ISBN 978-0-58205-6312.
- Mets, James Andrew (1902). Naval heroes of Holland. New York; London: The Abbey Press.
- Palmer, M. A.J. (April 1997). "The 'Military Revolution' Afloat: The Era of the Anglo-Dutch Wars and the Transition to Modern Warfare at Sea". War in History. 4 (2): 123–149. doi:10.1177/096834459700400201. JSTOR 26004420. S2CID 159657621.
- Blok, P.J. (1928). Michiel de Ruyter (PDF) (in Dutch). Martinus Nijhof.
