= English ship Gift =

History

France
- Name: Le Don de Dieu
- Captured: 4 September 1652
- Fate: taken by Blake's Fleet off Dunkirk

History

Commonwealth of England
- Name: Gift
- Acquired: 4 September 1652
- Commissioned: 1653
- Renamed: Great Gift 1658
- Honours and awards: Portland 1653; Gabbard 1653; Scheveningen 1653
- Fate: expended as fireship 25 July 1666

History

Kingdom of England
- Name: Great Gift
- Honours and awards: Orfordness 1666
- Captured: May 1660
- Fate: expended as Fireship 25 July 1666

General characteristics
- Class & type: 38-gun fourth rate
- Tons burthen: 490 22/94 bm
- Length: 98 ft 0 in (29.9 m) keel for tonnage
- Beam: 30 ft 8 in (9.3 m)
- Draught: 13 ft 6 in (4.1 m)
- Depth of hold: 12 ft 6 in (3.8 m)
- Sail plan: ship-rigged
- Complement: 130
- Armament: 36 1653; 40/32 1666

Gift was a 38-gun fourth rate vessel captured from the French by the Commonwealth of England, She was captured on 4 September 1652 as the 36-gun Le Don de Gieu. She was commissioned into the Parliamentary Naval Force as Gift. During the First Anglo-Dutch War she partook in the Battle of Portland, the Battle of the Gabbard and the Battle of Scheveningen. She spent time fishery patrols and escorting convoys. She was converted to a fireship in 1666 and expended at the St James Fight on 25 July 1666.

Gift was the first named vessel in the English or Royal Navy.

== Specifications ==
She was built as the French ship Le Don de Dieu. She was captured by Robert Blake's Fleet off Dunkirk on 4 September 1652. Her dimensions were 98 feet 0 inches (29.9 metres)keel for tonnage with a breadth of 30 feet 8 inches (9.3 metres) and a depth of hold of 12 feet 6 inches (3.8 metres). Her builder's measure tonnage was calculated as 490 22/94 tons. Her draught was 13 feet 6 inches (4.1 metres). Her gun armament in 1653 was 36 guns and it was changed to 40 wartime and 32 peacetime. Her manning was 130 personnel.

== Commissioned service ==
=== Service in the Commonwealth Navy ===
She was commissioned into the Commonwealth Navy in 1653 under the command of Captain Thomas Salmon.

==== First Anglo-Dutch War ====
During the First Anglo-Dutch War she partook in the Battle of Portland on 18 February 1653. As a member of Blue Squadron, Center Division she took part in the Battle of the Gabbard on 2–3 June 1653. With Captain Salmon being killed in battle Captain Edward Barnett took command. She then partook in the Battle of Scheveningen near Texel (as Gift Major) on the 31 of July 1653 as a member of the Blue Squadron, Van Division. In 1654 Captain Samuel Dickson took command.

In 1655 she came under Captain Mark Harrison in to 1657. In 1658 she was renamed Great Gift and sometimes referred to as Gift Major to differentiate her from a Spanish prize now named Little Gift. In 1660 she was under Captain Jeffrey Dare for the North Sea Fishery.

=== Service after the Restoration May 1660 ===
On 24 June 1660 she was under command of Captain George Batts until relieved by Captain George Bernard on 4 May 1661. Captain Jacob Reynolds took command on 5 July 1664 and sailed to Guinea in 1665. On her return she was converted to a fireship in 1666 crewed by 50 personnel and four guns. She was recommissioned on 26 June 1666 under Captain John Kelsey. She participated in the St James Day Battle on 25 June to 6 July 1666 as a fireship of Blue Squadron.

== Loss ==
Gift was expended as a fireship at the St James Day Fight on 25 July 1666.
