= English ship Gillyflower =

Royal Navy warship

History

Royalist Navy
- Name: Saint Michael
- Commissioned: 1650
- Captured: 1651
- Fate: Defected to Parliament Navy

Commonwealth of England
- Name: Gillyflower
- Acquired: August 1651
- Commissioned: 1651
- Honours and awards: Gabbard 1653
- Fate: Sold 18 June 1657

General characteristics
- Class & type: 32-gun fourth rate
- Tons burthen: 530 tons bm
- Sail plan: Full-rigged ship
- Complement: 120
- Armament: 32 guns

Gillyflower was a 32-gun fourth rate vessel of the Kingdom of England, She started life as the Genoese merchantman Archangel Saint Michael built 1639 in Amsterdam in 1639. she was captured by the Royalist privateers in November 1650, then defected to the Parliamentarians in 1651. During the First Anglo-Dutch War she partook in the Battle of The Gabbard. After an expedition to the West Indies she was found to be unfit and was sold in June 1657.

Gillyflower was the second named vessel since it was used for a 20 bm row barge in service from 1546 to 1548.

== Specifications ==
Her dimensions are unknown. Her builder's measurement tonnage was 530 tons. She carried 32 guns with a crew of 120 personnel.

== Commissioned service ==
=== Service in the English Civil War and Commonwealth Navy ===
She was commissioned as Saint Michael into Royalist Navy under Captain Goulding in 1651 but deserted to the Parliamentarians the same year. She was commissioned as Gillyflower into the Parliamentary Navy in 1651 under the command of Captain John Hayward.

==== First Anglo-Dutch War ====
During the First Anglo-Dutch War she partook in the Battle of Portland as a member of Robert Blake's Fleet on 18 through to 20 February 1653. She participated in the Battle of the Gabbard as a member of White Squadron, Van Division on 2–3 June 1653. In 1654 she was under Captain Henry Fenn for an expedition to the West Indies in December 1654, returning in November 1655. She was laid up at Deptford. On 6 March 1657 she was reported to be much eaten by worm.

== Disposition ==
Gillyflower was sold by Admiralty Order (AO) 8 June 1657 on 18 June 1657.
