= English ship Amity (1650) =

History

Commonwealth of England
- Name: Amity
- Acquired: 18 January 1650
- Commissioned: 1650
- Honours and awards: Portland 1653; Gabbard 1653

Kingdom of England
- Name: Amity
- Acquired: May 1660
- Honours and awards: Lowestoft 1665; Four Days' Battle 1666; Orfordness 1666
- Fate: Sold 27 November 1667

General characteristics
- Class & type: 38-gun fourth rate
- Tons burthen: 375 30/94 bm
- Length: 90 ft 0 in (27.4 m) keel for tonnage
- Beam: 28 ft 0 in (8.5 m)
- Draught: 15 ft 0 in (4.6 m)
- Depth of hold: 12 ft 0 in (3.7 m)
- Sail plan: ship-rigged
- Complement: 150 in 1653; 140/120/100 in 1660
- Armament: 38/30 in 1666; 12 × culverins; 14 × demi-culverins; 12 × sakers

Amity was a 36-gun fourth rate vessel, formerly belonging to the Commonwealth of England. She was hired by Parliament in November 1649, and later purchased on 18 January 1650, thus renamed. She was commissioned into the Parliamentary Naval Force as Amity. During the First Anglo-Dutch War she partook in the Battle of Portland and the Battle of The Gabbard. Later, after the Restoration in May 1660, she was incorporated into the English Navy. During the Second Anglo-Dutch War she participated in the Battle of Lowestoft, the Four Days' Battle and the St James Day Fight. She was sold on 27 November 1667.

== Specifications ==
Her dimensions were 90 feet 0 inches (27.4 metres) keel for tonnage with a breadth of 28 feet 0 inches (8.5 metres) and a depth of hold of 12 feet 0 inches (3.7 metres). Her builder's measure tonnage was calculated as 375 30/94 tons. Her draught was 15 feet 0 inches (4.6 metres).

Her gun armament in 1650 was 36 guns. In 1666 her armament was 38 (wartime)/30 (peacetime) and consisted of twelve culverins, (Note: The culverin was a gun of 4,500 pounds with a 5.5-inch bore firing a 17.5-pound shot with a twelve-pound powder charge) fourteen demi-culverins, (Note: The demi-culverin was a gun of 3,400 pounds with a four-inch bore firing a 9.5-pound shot with an eight-pound powder charge) twelve sakers. (Note: The sacar or saker was a gun of 1,400 pounds with a 3.5-inch bore firing a 5.5-pound shot with a 5.5-pound powder charge) Her manning was 150 personnel and rose to 140/120/100 personnel.

== Commissioned service ==
=== Service in the English Civil War and Commonwealth Navy ===
She was commissioned into the Parliamentary Navy in 1650 under the command of Captain John Coppin for Scottish Waters. In 1651, she was under Captain Michael Packe (later rear-admiral) with Ayscue in the West Indies. She was in action on 16 August 1652 during which Captain Michael Packe was mortally wounded. Later in 1653 she was under the command of Captain Henry Packe.

==== First Anglo-Dutch War ====
During the First Anglo-Dutch War she partook in the Battle of Portland on 18 February 1653 as a member of Robert Blake's Fleet. As a member of Blue Squadron, Rear Division she took part in the Battle of the Gabbard on 2–3 June 1653. In February 1654 she took a 20-gun Dutch ship.

She then sailed with Robert Blake's Fleet to the Mediterranean in 1654. She was at Tunis for the Battle of Porto Farina on 4 April 1655. She remained with Robert Blake's Fleet until 1657.

=== Service after the Restoration May 1660 ===
Captain John Stoakes was in command from 20 December 1660 to 26 December 1661. Captain John Parker took command on 23 May 1664 and held command until 9 June 1666.

==== Second Anglo-Dutch War ====
She was at the Battle of Lowestoft as a member of Red Squadron, Rear Division on 3 June 1665. She arrived with Prince Rupert's Squadron at the Four Days' Battle on 4 June 1666 as a member of the Rear Division. She suffered two killed and two wounded. She was at the St James Day Battle as a member of Blue Squadron, Center Division on 25 July 1666. On 28 July 1666 she was under Captain Stephen Pyend until 6 November 1667.

== Disposition ==
Amity was sold on 27 November 1667.
