= English ship Marmaduke =

English ship

History

Royalist Navy
- Name: Revenge
- Acquired: 1651
- Commissioned: 1651
- Captured: 1652
- Fate: Defected to Parliament Navy

History

Commonwealth of England
- Name: Marmaduke
- Acquired: 5 June 1652
- Commissioned: 1652
- Honours and awards: Gabbard 1653; Scheveningen 1653
- Fate: Scuttled June 1667, then sold 22 September 1669

History

Kingdom of England
- Name: Marmaduke
- Acquired: May 1660
- Honours and awards: Lowestoft 1665; Four Day's Fight 1666
- Fate: Scuttled June 1667, then sold 22 September 1669

General characteristics
- Class & type: 40-gun fourth rate
- Tons burthen: 456 70/94 bm
- Length: 87 ft 0 in (26.5 m) keel for tonnage
- Beam: 31 ft 5 in (9.6 m)
- Draught: 15 ft 0 in (4.6 m)
- Depth of hold: 15 ft 2 in (4.6 m)
- Sail plan: ship-rigged
- Complement: 160 in 1653; 110 in 1660; 160/120/100 in 1666
- Armament: 40 guns initially; 32 by 1660; 42/34 in 1666; 12 × culverins; 22 × demi-culverins; 8 × sakers

Marmaduke was a 40-gun fourth rate vessel of the Kingdom of England, Her initial commission was as a Royalist vessel during the English Civil War named Revenge. She defected to the Parliamentarians then commissioned as Marmaduke. During the First Anglo-Dutch War she partook in the Battle of The Gabbard. During the Second Anglo-Dutch War she participated in the Four Days' Fight. She was scuttled during the Dutch raid on the Medway and sold in 1669.

Marmaduke was the only named vessel in the English or Royal Navy.

Revenge was the second named vessel since it was used for a 46-gun galleon, launched in October 1577, captured by Spanish squadron off Azores 31 August 1591 and foundered on 5 September 1591.

== Specifications ==
Originally built as the English merchantman Marmaduke she was captured by Prince Rupert of the Rhine and his brother Maurice, respectively in charge of the ships HMS Constant Reformation and Swallow off the coast of Spain early in May 1650. She was then passed to the English Royalists and renamed the Revenge of Whitehall (later contracted to simply Revenge).

Her dimensions were 87 feet 0 inches (26.5 metres)keel for tonnage with a breadth of 31 feet 5 inches (9.6 metres) and a depth of hold of 15 feet 2 inches (4.6 metres). Her builder's measure tonnage was calculated as 456 70/94 tons. Her draught was 15 feet 0 inches (4.6 metres).

Her gun armament originally was 42 guns. In 1653 she carried 40 guns the 32 guns in 1660. In 1666 her armament was 42 (wartime)/34 (peacetime) and consisted of twelve culverins, (Note: The culverin was a gun of 4,500 pounds with a 5.5-inch bore firing a 17.5-pound shot with a twelve-pound powder charge) twenty-two demi-culverines, (Note: The demi-culverin was a gun of 3,400 pounds with a four-inch bore firing a 9.5-pound shot with an eight-pound powder charge) eight sakers. (Note: The sacar or saker was a gun of 1,400 pounds with a 3.5-inch bore firing a 5.5-pound shot with a 5.5-pound powder charge) Her manning was 160 personnel in 1653, then dropped to 110 in 1660 then in the 1666 establishment it was 160/120/100 personnel.

== Commissioned service ==
=== Service in the English Civil War and Commonwealth Navy ===
She was commissioned as Revenge into Royalist Navy under Captain Thomas Price in 1651 then in early 1652 under Captain Philip Marshall. She defected to the Parliamentary Navy on 31 May 1652, after a mutiny in April. She was purchased by the Parliamentarians on 5 June 1652. she was commissioned as Marmaduke into the Parliamentary Navy in 1652 under the command of Captain John Bonner.

==== First Anglo-Dutch War ====
In early 1653 she was under Captain Edward Blagg. As a member of Red Squadron, Center Division she took part in the Battle of the Gabbard on 2–3 June 1653. on 31 July 1653 as a member of Red Squadron, Center Division she participated in the Battle of Scheveningen. Later in 1853 she was under the command of Captain Jonathan Grove. 1655 brought a new commander, Captain William Godfrey for the Irish Station. She was repaired at Deptford in 1657. In 1658 she was under Captain Peter Butler sailing with a convoy of East India ships to St Helena in 1659 and returning with a home bound convoy.

=== Service after the Restoration May 1660 ===
She was repaired at Portsmouth between 1661 and 1662. On 7 April 1664 she was under the command of Captain John Best.

==== Second Anglo-Dutch War ====
She participated in the Battle of Lowestoft as a member of Blue Squadron, Van Division on 3 June 1665. Captain Bestdied on 15 November 1665. She again was under command of Captain Godfrey on 1 January 1666. As a member of Red Squadron, Van Division she took part in the Four Days' Battle on 1–4 June 1666. During the battle she suffered 10 killed and 31 wounded.

== Disposition ==
Marmaduke was scuttled in June 1667 during the Dutch raid on the Medway. She could not be salvaged and then sold to Thomas Gould for £151 (Note: The cost accounting for inflation of approximately £30,600 in reference to today.) on 22 June 1669.
