= Jeremiah Smith (Royal Navy officer) =

British Royal Navy officer (died 1675)

Admiral Sir Jeremiah Smith
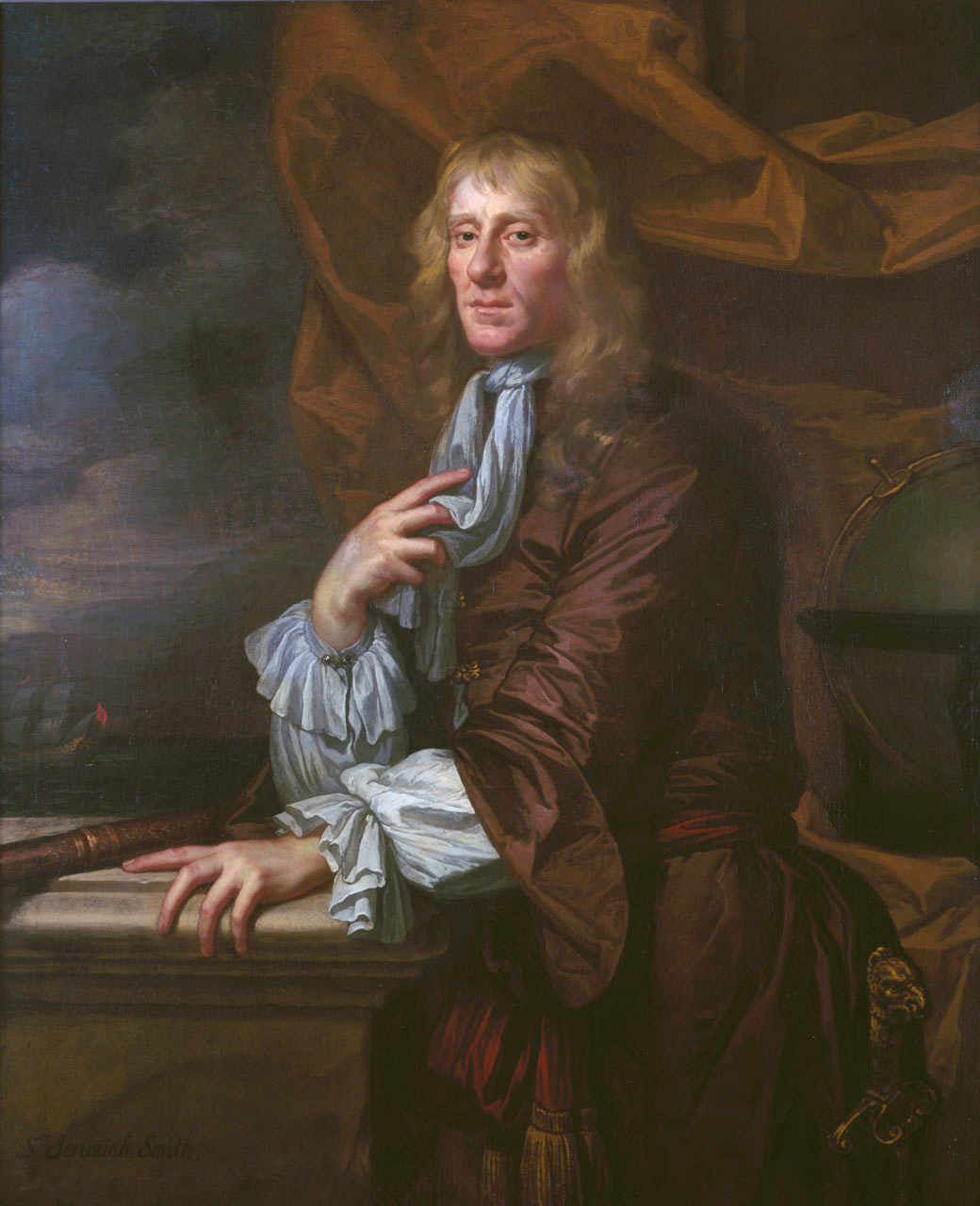
- Portrait by Sir Peter Lely, 1666
- Died: October/November 1675; Clapham, England
- Burial place: Hemingbrough
- Military career
- Allegiance: Kingdom of England; Commonwealth of England
- Branch: Royal Navy
- Service years: Finished 1675
- Rank: Admiral
- Commands: Advice; Essex; HMS Mary; HMS Royal Sovereign
- Conflicts: First Anglo-Dutch War; Battle of the Gabbard; Battle of Scheveningen; Second Anglo-Dutch War; Battle of Lowestoft; Four Days' Battle; St. James's Day Battle

Sir Jeremiah Smith (sometimes written as Jeremy Smith or Smyth; died October/November 1675) was an officer of the Royal Navy who saw service during the First and Second Anglo-Dutch Wars, rising to the rank of admiral.

Smith served in the Navy during the period of the Commonwealth, commanding ships at several of the battles of the First Anglo-Dutch War. He continued in the Navy after the restoration of the monarchy and was involved in further actions with the Dutch, during the Second Anglo-Dutch War. He rose through the ranks to become one of the junior commanders of the royal fleets, and at times commanded squadrons of his own on independent cruises. He was heavily involved in the St. James's Day Battle, where he commanded the English rear, and fought a hard-pitched battle against a Dutch squadron under Cornelis Tromp. Smith became involved in a professional rivalry with another naval officer, Sir Robert Holmes, but successfully repudiated charges of cowardice, and held office in the naval administration, until his death in 1675.

== Family and early life ==
Smith was the third son of Jeremiah Smith, initially of Canterbury, but who is believed to have established himself as a shipowner and merchant based in Hull, and who resided at Birkin with his wife, Frances. The younger Jeremiah Smith may have served in the New Model Army during the English Civil War. He is recorded as having been appointed to command the 42-gun Advice during the period of the Commonwealth, and as having signed the declaration of confidence in the leadership of Oliver Cromwell on 22 April 1653, made by the admirals and captains of the fleet. He commanded Advice at the English victory over the Dutch at the Battle of the Gabbard in June 1653, and the inconclusive Battle of Scheveningen in July that year. From Advice he was appointed to command the newly built Essex in December 1653, and was given a small squadron of warships to patrol in the North Sea.

== Second Anglo-Dutch War ==
Smith remained in the navy after the restoration of the monarchy, and in 1664 was given command of the 50-gun HMS Mary. He commanded her at the Battle of Lowestoft in June 1665, supporting the English commander, James, Duke of York. The Duke of York's flagship, HMS Royal Charles, came under heavy fire from the Dutch flagship, Eendracht. Smith came to the Duke's assistance, taking his ship between Royal Charles and Eendracht and sustaining several powerful broadsides from the Dutch ship. Cannon fire from either Mary or Royal Charles then ignited the Eendracht's power magazine, which blew up, destroying the ship and killing Admiral Jacob van Wassenaer Obdam. For his part in the battle, he was one of thirteen naval officers chosen to have their portraits painted by Sir Peter Lely as part of the Flagmen of Lowestoft, ordered by James, Duke of York. Of Lely's portrait of Smith, the art historian John Rothenstein wrote "The cold and sombre Admiral Sir Jeremy Smith is surely one of the finest portraits of the age", while Ellis Waterhouse commented that "'Sir Jeremy Smith' shows Lely at the summit of his powers of drawing, painting and interpretation."

Smith was moved to the 100-gun HMS Royal Sovereign in 1665 and sent to the Mediterranean with a squadron of ships under his command. He returned to Britain and was appointed admiral of the blue squadron in the royal fleet, taking part in the Four Days' Battle in June 1666, under the overall command of George Monck, 1st Duke of Albemarle. Smith was knighted in June, and in July fought in the St. James's Day Battle, still as admiral of the blue, and commanding the rear squadron in the battle from HMS Loyal London. His squadron, the weakest of the English fleet, engaged the strongest Dutch squadron, under Cornelis Tromp. In doing so Smith prevented Tromp from coming to the assistance of Michiel de Ruyter, whose force was severely mauled by the van of the English fleet. After a period of fierce fighting Smith withdrew from the line, either by choice or by being forced out by the Dutch. Tromp followed, weakening the Dutch line. During the battle Tromp's flagship lost over a hundred men, and was nearly captured by Sir Edward Spragge, one of Smith's junior flag officers. The Dutch rear-admiral of Tromp's squadron was killed fighting Smith's force.

Sir Robert Holmes, who had started the battle with the red squadron, before becoming separated and subsequently joining Smith's blue squadron, accused Smith of having withdrawn through cowardice. Smith was tried by court-martial and acquitted. Holmes and Smith remained bitter enemies, and may even have duelled over the matter. Holmes was a protégé of Prince Rupert of the Rhine, while Smith had the Duke of Albemarle as his patron. Both supported their respective charges. Eventually King Charles II intervened to settle the matter, largely in Smith's favour, and he remained in the navy despite professional enmities. In 1667 he was given a small squadron with which to attack Dutch commerce in the North Sea. This was followed by an appointment in 1668 to be vice-admiral of the fleet in the English Channel under Sir Thomas Allin.

== Domestic and later life ==
Smith became Comptroller of Victualling in 1669, and held the post until his death. He had become an important landowner during his time in the navy, buying Prior House in Hemingbrough, near Selby in 1662, and acquiring land in the area, including the manor of Osgodby in 1668. He was twice married, having at least three sons by his second wife, Anne. Smith died at Clapham sometime in either October or November 1675, his will being last dated on 13 October 1675 and then being proved on 13 November. His body was returned to his holdings at Hemingbrough and was buried in the church there, where a monument was later raised to his memory. He was described during his lifetime by the Italian diplomat Lorenzo Magalotti as "... a soldier of fortune like all the others, born and bred on the water, so to speak."
