= English ship Success (1650) =

English ship

History

France
- Name: Jules
- Acquired: 1648
- Captured: 19 October 1650
- Fate: taken by Phoenix off Portuguese coast

Commonwealth of England
- Name: Success
- Acquired: 19 October 1650
- Commissioned: 1651
- Honours and awards: Portland 1653; Gabbard 1653; Port Farina 1655
- Fate: Sold 3 September 1662

General characteristics
- Class & type: 38-gun fourth rate
- Tons burthen: 450 0/94 bm
- Length: 94 ft 0 in (28.7 m) keel for tonnage
- Beam: 30 ft 0 in (9.1 m)
- Draught: 14 ft 0 in (4.3 m)
- Depth of hold: 11 ft 6 in (3.5 m)
- Sail plan: ship-rigged
- Complement: 150 initially; 160 in 1653; 140/110/80 in 1660
- Armament: 38 initially; 34/30 later

Success was a 38-gun fourth rate vessel captured from the French by the Commonwealth of England, She was captured on 19 October 1650 as the 38-gun Jules. She was commissioned into the Parliamentary Naval Force as Success. During the First Anglo-Dutch War she partook in the Battle of Portland and the Battle of Porto Farina. She spent time in the Mediterranean and escorting convoys. She was sold on 3 September 1662.

Success was the first named vessel in the English or Royal Navy.

== Specifications ==
She was built in Stockholm in 1647 as the Julius then gifted to France in 1648 as the Jules. She was captured by Phoenix on 19 October 1650 off the Portuguese coast. Her dimensions were 94 feet 0 inches (28.7 metres)keel for tonnage with a breadth of 30 feet 0 inches (9.1 metres) and a depth of hold of 11 feet 6 inches (3.5 metres). Her builder's measure tonnage was calculated as 450 0/94 tons. Her draught was 14 feet 0 inches (4.3 metres). Her gun armament in 1650 was 38 guns and it was decreased to 34 wartime and 30 peacetime. Her manning was 150 personnel and later to 140/110/80 personnel.

== Commissioned service ==
=== Service in the English Civil War and Commonwealth Navy ===
She was commissioned into the Parliamentary Navy in 1651 under the command of Captain Butler Noades until he was killed in 1652. Later in 1652 she was under Captain William Kendall.

==== First Anglo-Dutch War ====
During the First Anglo-Dutch War she partook in the Battle of Portland on 18 February 1653. As a member of Blue Squadron, Center Division she took part in the Battle of the Gabbard on 2–3 June 1653.

She then sailed with Robert Blake's Fleet to the Mediterranean in August 1654. She partook in the Battle of Porto Farina in Tunisia on 4 April 1655. She was under Captain Zachary Brown in to 1657. In 1658 she was under Captain Thomas Fleet, She escorted a convoy of East India ships to Helena, returning with the home bound convoy in 1660. She was laid in ordinary on her return.

== Disposition ==
Success was reported as not worth repairing on 15 April 1662 and sold on 3 September 1662.
