= HMS Charity =

Four ships of the British Royal Navy have been named HMS Charity:

- HMS Charity (1650), a fireship captured from France in 1650 and originally named Charité, expended in 1652.
- HMS Charity (1653), a 36 gun 453 ton (builder's measure) ship captured from the Dutch in 1653. Recaptured by the Dutch on 3 June 1665. Also known as HMS Great Charity.
- HMS Charity (1770), a sloop operating on the Great Lakes. Launched in 1770, lost 1777.
- HMS Charity (R29), a C-class destroyer launched in July 1943 and sold to the United States in June 1958. The ship was modernised in the United Kingdom before being transferred under the United States Military Aid Program to Pakistan in December 1958. Serving as PNS Shah Jahan (sometimes written PNS Shahjehan) the ship was scrapped in 1971 after being damaged beyond repair by an Indian Styx missile during the Indo-Pakistani War on 4 December 1971.
