= George Ayscue =

English naval officer and colonial administrator

Admiral Sir George Ayscue
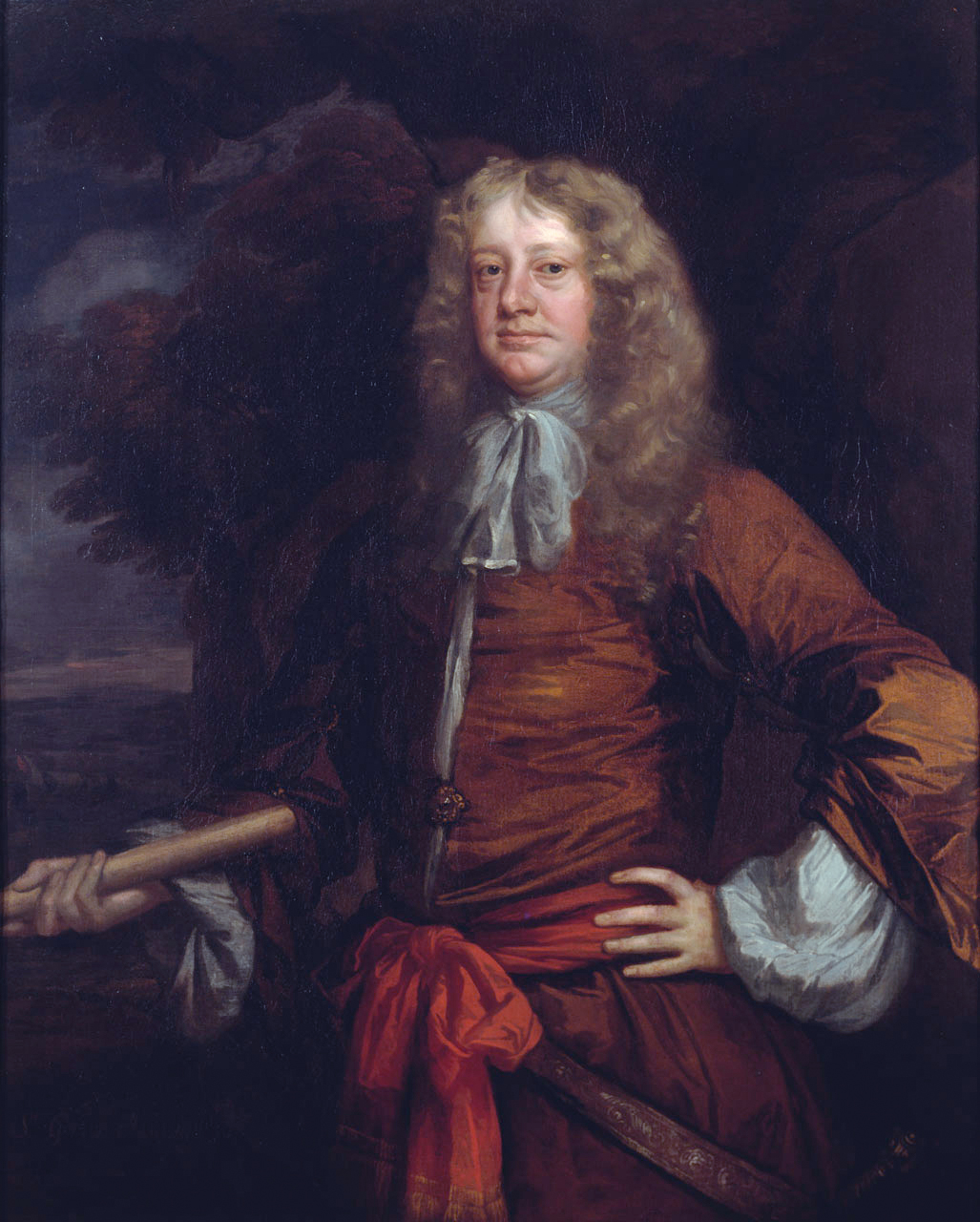
- Portrait by Sir Peter Lely, 1665–1666
- Born: 1616
- Died: 5 April 1672 (aged 55–56); Westminster, London
- Burial place: St Margaret's Church, Westminster, England
- Military career
- Allegiance: England
- Branch: Royal Navy
- Service years: 1646–1672
- Rank: Admiral of the White
- Commands: Admiral of the Irish Seas
- Conflicts: Battle of Plymouth (1652); Battle of Lowestoft; Four Days' Battle

Admiral of the White Sir George Ayscue (c. 1616 – 5 April 1672) was an English naval officer and colonial administrator who served in the English Civil War and the Anglo-Dutch Wars. He also served as the governor of the Isles of Scilly in 1647 and governor of Barbados from 1650 to 1652.

== Biography ==
Ayscue (sometimes spelled Askew or Ayscough) came from an old Lincolnshire family, and was knighted by Charles I on 9 August 1641. In 1646 he received a naval command, In August 1647 he was appointed Governor of the Isles of Scilly, a post he held until January 1648.

In July 1648, during the Civil War, while serving as a captain in the navy of the English Parliament, he was recognized as restoring sailors' allegiances at sea and later in the year given command of two vessels and promoted to Rear Admiral.

In 1649, he was appointed Admiral of the Irish Seas. In 1650 Ayscue was appointed Governor of Barbados and Commander of the squadron sent to the island. In 1651, he served with General at Sea Robert Blake in the capture of the Scilly Isles from Sir John Granville, 1st Earl of Bath. Later that year he captured Barbados from Lord Willoughby and the other English colonies in the Americas.

In the First Anglo-Dutch War he was defeated by the Dutch Commodore Michiel de Ruyter at the Battle of Plymouth. Relieved of his command, he went into service in the Swedish Navy, returning after the Restoration of Charles II. In 1664 he was appointed Rear-Admiral of the Blue Squadron. In June 1665, he was appointed Vice-Admiral of the Blue. During the Second Anglo-Dutch War he commanded a squadron at the Battle of Lowestoft in 1665.

In February 1666, he was appointed Admiral of the Blue and at the start of the Four Days' Battle in June 1666 he was elevated to the rank of Admiral of the White, his flagship, Prince Royal, ran aground on the Galloper Shoal and he was forced to surrender his ship to Lieutenant-Admiral Cornelis Tromp, earning the unfortunate distinction of being the highest-ranking English naval officer to have been captured by the enemy. He was held prisoner during the war in the Dutch Loevestein Castle prison, and almost certainly never again took to sea as admiral.

In December 1671, he was the President of the Court Martial of Rear-Admiral Sir William Jennings, held on board Monmouth. Sir George Ayscue was still a serving officer when he died at his Westminster house on 5 April 1672. His burial was held on 13 April 1672 at St Margaret's Church, Westminster, London, England.

Government offices
Preceded by The Lord Willoughby of Parham	Governor of Barbados; 1651–1652	Succeeded by Daniel Searle, acting
