= Joseph Jordan (Royal Navy officer) =

English naval officer

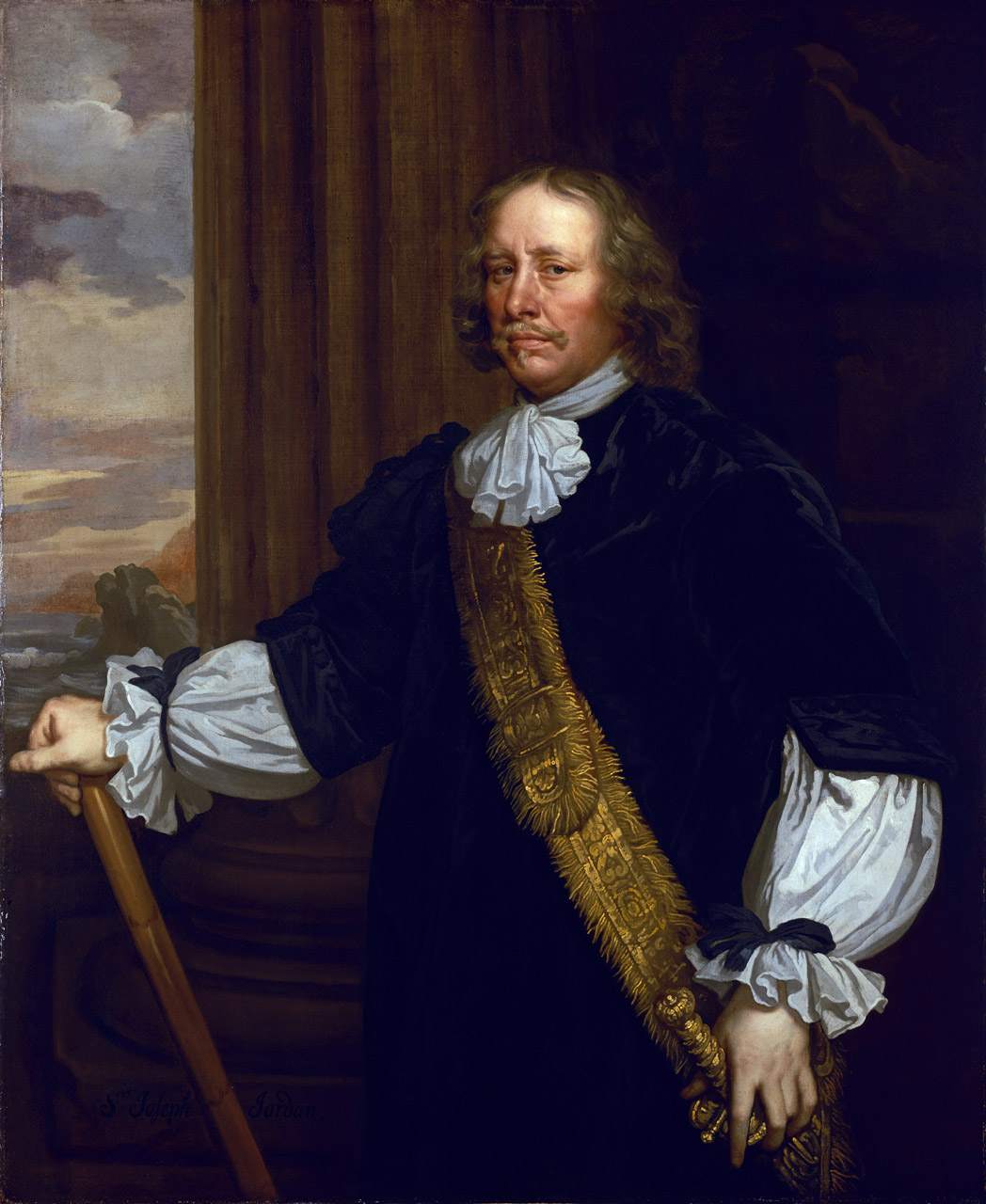
1666 portrait of Jordan by Sir Peter Lely, part of the Flagmen of Lowestoft series

Sir Joseph Jordan (c. 1603 – 1685) was an English naval officer. From a Thames shipowning family, he is initially recorded as importing tobacco from Nevis and Barbados aboard the Amity.

During the English Civil War, he served in the parliamentary navy commanding the merchantman Caesar in the summer guard of 1642; later that year he was recorded taking castles around the Isle of Wight. In 1643 he served as rear-admiral in the Irish guard and the following year was active off the Channel Islands and at the relief of Lyme Regis and, in 1645, the siege of Weymouth. He remained loyal to parliament during the 1648 naval revolt and in February 1649 signed remonstrance congratulating the army and the Commons for restoring liberty.

Following a short period abroad, Jordan resumed his naval career in 1650, was a flag-officer in the First Anglo-Dutch War and a member of the expedition against Algiers and Tunis under Robert Blake in April 1655. He was brought into service again in 1664 and served as a flag-officer in the Second Anglo-Dutch War, 1665–7, knighted in 1665 after the Battle of Lowestoft; was rear-admiral of the Red squadron, with George Monck, 1st Duke of Albemarle, in the inconclusive Four Days Battle, 1–4 June 1666, and vice-admiral of the Red at the victory in the St. James's Day Battle, 25 July 1666.

In the Third Anglo-Dutch War, 1672–4., as vice-admiral of the Blue, he led the fleet into action in HMS Royal Sovereign, 100 guns, in the Battle of Solebay, 28 May 1672. At the time it was alleged he had deliberately chosen to expose to danger Admiral Edward Montagu, 1st Earl of Sandwich, HMS Royal James, who died in the battle, in order to protect the Duke of York, later James II of England.

After the war he was granted a pension and lived in retirement.
