= Weather gage =

Windward position in sailing

The weather gage (sometimes spelled weather gauge or known as nautical gauge) is the advantageous position of a fighting sailing vessel relative to another. The concept is from the Age of Sail and is now antique. A ship at sea is said to possess the weather gage if it is in any position upwind of the other vessel -- having the wind at their back, speeding progress, when sailing towards the other ship. Proximity with the land, tidal and stream effects and wind variability due to geography (hills, cliffs, etc.) may also come into play.

- An upwind vessel is able to manoeuvre at will toward any downwind point, since the relative wind then moves aft.
- The fastest points of sail for a frigate typically have the wind blowing in the direction of travel, allowing that ship greater choice in the distance of separation. They could more easily disengage if damaged, and could more easily optimize for the range of their gunnery.
- However, in sailing warfare, the leeward ship gained a point of advantage in gunnery under heavier wind. When beating to windward, the vessel experiences heeling under the sideward pressure of the wind. This restricts gunnery, as cannon on the windward side are elevated, while the leeward gun ports aim into the sea or in heavy weather may be awash.
- Ships seeking to evade capture or attack have the advantage being downwind if they are faster vessels or are close to friendly land -- but in heavier weather a strong disadvantage if there is danger of grounding on a lee shore
- A vessel downwind of another, in attempting to attack upwind, is constrained to trim sail as the relative wind moves forward and cannot point too far into the wind for fear of being headed. The helm is typically more responsive on a downwind course. Sailing upwind involves frequent changes of sail: more tiring for the crew, more chance for mishap, and more taxing for the helm.
- A ship with the weather gage, turning downwind to attack, may alter course at will to bring starboard and port guns to appropriate elevations.

The term has had a literary rebirth in the popular seafaring novels of C.S. Forester, Patrick O'Brian and Alexander Kent. One of the last times that weather gage was perhaps a factor in a surface naval engagement was in the Battle of the Denmark Strait in 1941, where the German battleship Bismarck and the heavy cruiser Prinz Eugen held the weather gage over the British battleship HMS Prince of Wales and the battlecruiser HMS Hood. Being upwind, the German ships had the advantage that their rangefinders were drier than the British rangefinders facing the spray. The weather restricted the visual range to much less than the gun range.

The weather gage is a critical component of aircraft carrier operations. Most carrier aircraft are easier to launch if the aircraft carrier is steaming into the wind to generate stronger apparent winds across the deck that allows for greater lift to be generated at lower actual speeds. The Battle of the Philippine Sea is a notable incident of the advantage of the weather gage for carrier operations. American carriers were upwind of the Japanese carriers. Every time an American aircraft carrier conducted flight operations, they opened the range to the Japanese fleet. Japanese carriers could conduct flight operations while closing the range to the American fleet.

The concept of weather gage is still useful in modern yacht racing, although the term is rarely used. The sails of a boat disrupt the wind to leeward; this disruption is often called "gas" or "dirty air". An overtaking boat on a downwind course can position itself to focus its dirty air on the boat ahead of it. Conversely, a boat on an upwind course may find itself trapped in the dirty air of a boat immediately to windward. Right-of-way rules give priority to the leeward boat and can make it advantageous to be the boat without the weather gage, especially just before the start or when the boat to leeward can point higher into the wind.

== Weather gauge ==
Gauge and gage are often used as alternative spellings. To the extent that there is a difference, a weather gauge can be a form of meteorological instrumentation for measuring weather quantitatively, such as a rain gauge, thermometer, anemometer, or barometer. A gage is a challenge, and hence an entry into battle, though the word is more commonly embedded in the word engage.
