= Battle of Lowestoft =

1665 naval battle during the Second Anglo-Dutch War

- Part of the Second Anglo-Dutch War
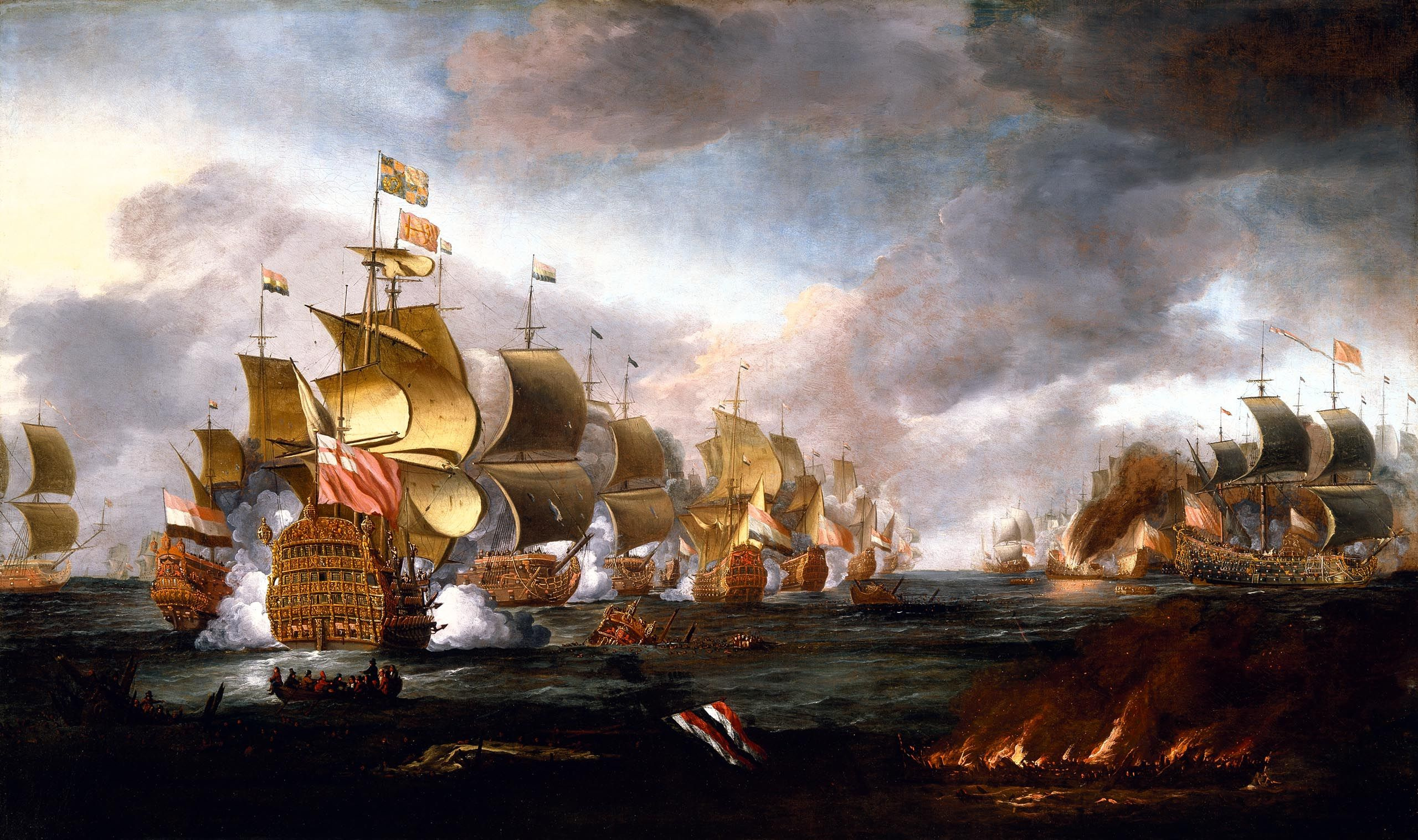
- The Battle of Lowestoft, Adriaen Van Diest
Date	13 June 1665
Location	Off Lowestoft, English Channel 52.05°N 2.40°E
Result	English victory

Belligerents
England	Dutch Republic

Commanders and leaders
Prince Rupert; Duke of York; Earl of Sandwich	Jacob Obdam †; Johan Evertsen; Cornelis Tromp

Strength
109 warships 4,542 guns 22,055 men	103 warships 4,869 guns 21,613 men

Casualties and losses
500 killed and wounded 1 warship captured	2,500 killed and wounded 2,000 captured 3 warships sunk 5 warships destroyed 9 warships captured

The Battle of Lowestoft took place on 13 June [O.S. 3 June] 1665 during the Second Anglo-Dutch War. A fleet of more than a hundred ships of the United Provinces commanded by Lieutenant-Admiral Jacob van Wassenaer, Lord Obdam, attacked an English fleet of equal size commanded by James, Duke of York, forty miles east of the port of Lowestoft in Suffolk.

Although it was a substantial English victory, the escape of the bulk of the Dutch fleet deprived England of the chance of ending the war quickly with a single decisive victory. As a result, the Dutch were able to make good their losses by building new and better-armed ships and improving their organisation and discipline. Their Dutch fleets would not be so badly organised or ill-disciplined in the remaining battles of this war and, in Obdam's replacement, Michiel de Ruyter, the Dutch had gained a superb tactician and leader for the remainder of the war.

== Background ==
The Second Anglo-Dutch War resulted from long-standing commercial tensions between England and the Netherlands. Despite diplomatic negotiations to avoid the outbreak of war, each country refused to compromise, and hostile acts by each side continued. The English ambassador in France reported that Louis XIV would probably evade his treaty obligations and refuse to be drawn into war with England if the Dutch could be provoked into declaring war: following English attacks on Dutch convoys, one off Cádiz and the other in the English Channel, the Dutch Republic did declare war on England on 4 March 1665. At the start of the war, both sides considered an early decisive battle was desirable, as English government finances could not sustain a long war, and as an English blockade of Dutch ports and attacks on their merchant and fishing fleets would soon bring about the ruin of the Dutch economy. After an early English blockade which took place in April and May was broken off through its ships' lack of supplies, the Dutch were desperate to prevent a second blockade. The Grand Pensionary and leading Dutch politician, Johan de Witt and other members of the States-General, formed a commission to supervise Obdam, which gave him detailed instructions comprising 26 articles, ordering him to attack the English aggressively when and where he could do them most damage. However, these instructions gave Obdam little guidance on how he should do so.

Although the Dutch had ordered the construction of many new warships, during and after the First Anglo-Dutch War, including several comparable to the all but the largest English ships to augment the existing fleet, not all of these were completed or fitted out by 1665. To complete Obdam's fleet, eighteen older warships that had been laid up after the First Anglo-Dutch War were reactivated, and several very large Dutch East India Company built hybrid ships were added. These could be used for carrying cargo, as convoy escorts or in battle, although they were not as strongly built as pure warships. Perhaps realising that his fleet was still too inferior in organisation, training, discipline and firepower to challenge the English successfully in a decisive battle, Obdam prepared to postpone the fight until the wind turned favourable in order to seek a limited confrontation, with his fleet in a defensive leeward position from which it could disengage quickly and return to its ports without openly disobeying orders. However, this opportunistic attitude and lack of a clear strategic plan was a significant cause of his defeat and death. The instructions issued by the commission headed by de Witt insisted on specifying that the Dutch fleet's order of battle should involve its division into a seven squadrons with a total of 21 flag officers for political reasons. Each of the five Dutch admiralties had its own set of flag officers, including many recently appointed ones. Each of the three smaller admiralties insisted on having its own squadron, so the larger Admiralties of Amsterdam and the Maas (i.e. Rotterdam) then split their forces in two squadrons, each of similar size to those of the smaller admiralties. This resulted in seven squadrons, each with three flag officers; several were led by Lieutenant Admirals of equal rank to Obdam, who commanded his own squadron as well as the whole fleet.

As the seven squadrons were not subdivided, the 14 subordinate flag officers had no clear function, except as potential replacements for their leaders. In addition, several squadrons had ships or flag officers from more than one admiralty, complicating their chain of command. Both national fleets could only be made as large as they were by employing armed merchants: the English used 24 of these, the Dutch twelve. On 11 June, a ship detached from the English fleet sighted the Dutch fleet sailing from the east with a light following breeze, and the fleet tried to close in on the Dutch against an adverse wind. At 4pm, the strength of the turning tide and a near calm forced the English fleet to anchor, and the Dutch did not make use of the favourable current to attack them, but also anchored, so avoiding battle that day. Obdam certainly wished to fight and had clear orders to do so, but an easterly breeze would prevent the Dutch fleet from retreating if it were outfought, and his waiting for a westerly breeze may have saved the bulk of the Dutch fleet from destruction by allowing it to withdraw after the resulting battle. On 12 June the wind again blew from the east, and again Obdam declined to attack, despite holding the weather gage. The two fleets sailed westward for most of the day, until the wind veered to a southerly, then a southwesterly, direction overnight. By dawn, the wind had strengthened and was from a direction between southwest and south, which slightly favoured the English fleet. Obdam decided to attack and he now approached the enemy, possibly fearing that if the wind became more westerly, it would favour the English fleet even more.

The English fleet of 109 ships carried 4,542 guns and 22,055 men; it consisted of three squadrons:

1. Prince Rupert of the Rhine commanded the van, the White Squadron
2. James himself commanded the centre, the Red Squadron, and
3. Edward Montagu, 1st Earl of Sandwich, commanded the rearguard, the Blue Squadron

The Dutch fleet of 103 ships carrying 4,869 guns and 21,613 men had no fewer than seven squadrons:

1. First squadron, from the Admiralty of Amsterdam, commanded by van Wassenaer himself in Eendracht
2. Second squadron, mainly from the Admiralties of Zeeland and the Maas, commanded by Lieutenant Admiral Johan Evertsen on Hof van Zeeland
3. Third squadron from the Admiralty of Amsterdam, commanded by Lieutenant Admiral Egbert Bartholomeusz Kortenaer on Groot Hollandia
4. Fourth squadron, mainly from the Frisian fleet with some East Indies Company ships, commanded by Lieutenant Admiral Auke Stellingwerf on Sevenwolden
5. Fifth squadron from the Admiralty of Amsterdam, commanded by Vice Admiral Cornelis Tromp on Liefde
6. Sixth squadron, mainly from the Admiralties of Zeeland and the Maas, commanded by Vice Admiral Cornelis Evertsen the Elder on Vlissingen and
7. Seventh squadron from the Admiralty of the Northern Quarter commanded by Vice Admiral Volckert Schram on Wapen van Nassau

== Battle ==
=== Morning ===
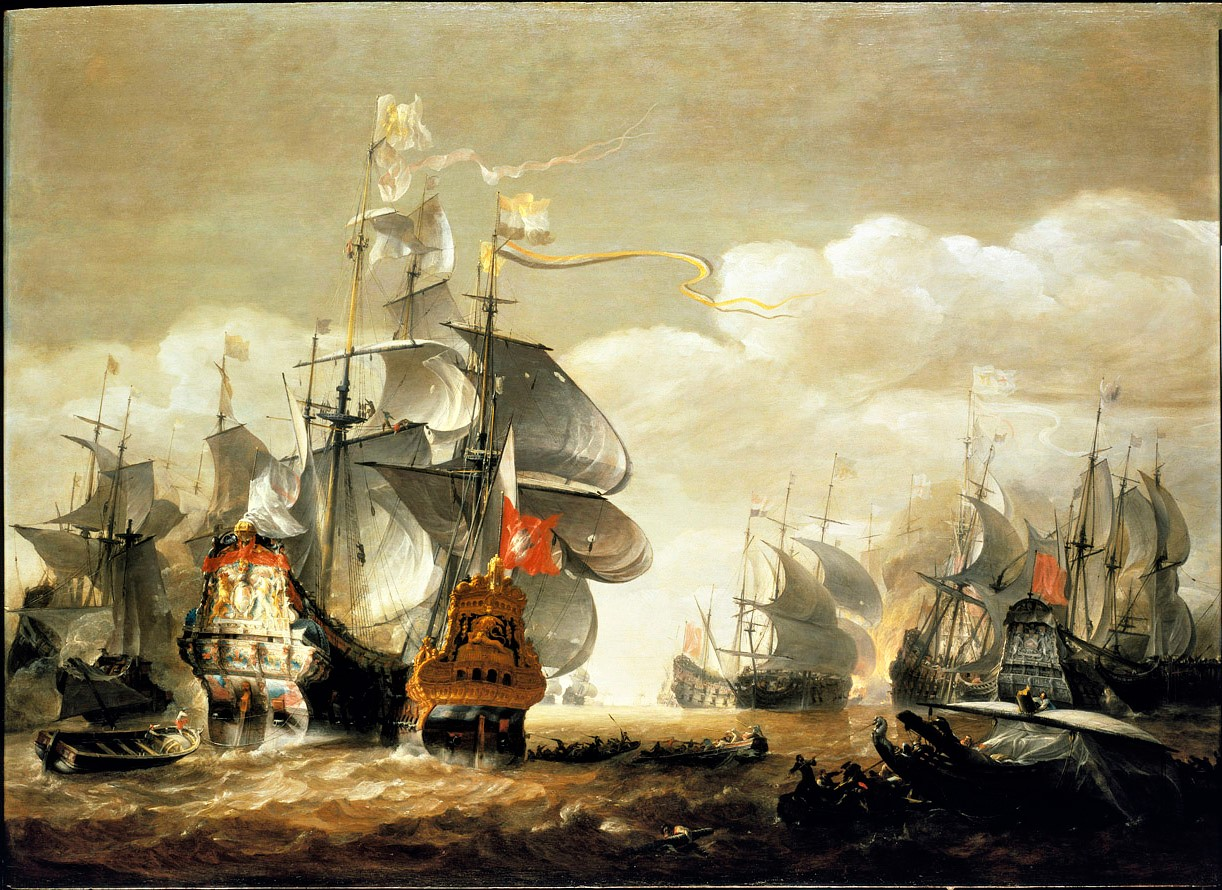
The Battle of Lowestoft, by Hendrik van Minderhout

It is difficult to give a fully coherent account of the battle, and more so to recover the intentions of the commanders, particularly those of Obdam who did not survive the battle. He had, on 12 June, sent all of his silverware and other valuables home, which perhaps shows his state of mind. Although Obdam has been accused of lack both of leadership and tactical insight, masked in earlier battles where Egbert Bartholomeusz Kortenaer, who had been promoted to be a lieutenant-admiral at Lowestoft, had been his flag captain. Although the English found Obdam's behaviour puzzling, his tactical decisions may relate to his appreciation that his out-gunned, poorly organised fleet could only succeed in battle under ideal conditions and needed to be able to disengage if it risked defeat. After their defeat, the surviving Dutch flag officers, in order to exonerate themselves, pretended their fleet had followed the original written orders, blaming misfortune and cowardice among the merchant captains for the disaster. In the early morning of the 13th, both fleets were about 40 miles southeast of Lowestoft, with the Dutch fleet southeast of the English fleet. The wind was described as a "fine chasing gale", implying a strong but not excessive wind, from a direction between southwest and south. Just before dawn, at around 4am, Obdam made a sudden westward dash to regain the weather gage, trying to pass to the south of the English fleet. In Sandwich's account, Sir Christopher Myngs, leading the English van, immediately moved southeast to prevent this, and was able to retain the weather gage, forcing the leading Dutch ships to steer northwest, the two fleets passing in opposite directions but at some distance. As Obdam's move surprised his own fleet, it was left in some confusion. An alternative interpretation was that the wind was blowing from the northwest and van Wassenaer tried to engage the English from a defensive leeward position. However, Warnsinck's detailed account from a Dutch perspective confirms a southwest wind was blowing.

During this first pass, the Great Charity (originally an Amsterdam Directors' ship the Groote Liefde, which was captured during the Battle of Portland in 1653) became isolated to the east of the Dutch line and was boarded and captured by captain Jan den Haen, the later admiral, who immediately returned with his prize to the Netherlands. This obviously unsound practice would be prohibited in the Dutch fleet after this battle. Another English ship, the merchantman John & Abigail was also isolated, but eventually managed to rejoin the English fleet. Later an English victory tune "The Dutch Armado A Meer Bravado" declared: "Fortune was pleasant when she lent the Dutch our 'Charity' a thing they wanted much." After this, there was a second pass that needed each fleet to reverse course. Penn had inserted a new article in the fleet's Fighting Instructions requiring it to tack from the rear, so reversing the order of the fleet, but Penn later recounted that displaying the signal for this manoeuvre was delayed until after the Dutch fleet had already started to turn. Prince Rupert in the van, realising there was a problem, ordered his Red Squadron to reverse course while maintaining the same order, although his leading division under Myngs at first missed Rupert's signal. Penn then cancelled his first order and the Duke led the centre and rear of his squadron to the northwest, but his leading division under Lawson ignored his admiral's turn until the Blue Squadron under Sandwich began its own turn. This left a large gap to the rear of Rupert's White Squadron. Fortunately for the English, the Dutch fleet was sufficiently far to the north to be unable to take immediate advantage of this gap and, from 6am to 7am, the two fleets were not engaged.

Penn's solution to the developing Dutch threat, was bold: soon after 7am he steered the Royal Charles and the bulk of the Red Squadron to the west to form a second battleline to prevent Obdam gaining the weather gage. The Dutch made no attempt to do so, whether because of Penn's manoeuvre or because their ships could not steer sufficiently westward against a southwesterly wind. In addition, Sandwich's Blue Squadron had largely closed the gap left by Rupert's squadron, and had formed in a rather disordered line behind him, with Lawson's division following Sandwich. The fighting during this pass was at a closer range than in the first one, and the Dutch ships attempted to break through the English line: although three of their ships temporarily succeeded, they were soon forced back. Once the whole Dutch fleet was opposite the English, James and Penn decided to attempt the manoeuvre of tacking from the rear a second time. This required careful coordination and timing, but it was achieved under fire, such that Lawson's division now led Sandwich, with Rupert in the rear. Following this, the two fleets were now moving in the same northwesterly direction at the same speed from about 8am. Up to this point, casualties had been relatively light, but in the heavy fighting that followed, the Frisian commander, Lieutenant-Admiral Auke Stellingwerf, was cut in two and the veteran Lieutenant-Admiral Kortenaer, probably the most competent Dutch commander present, was fatally wounded, both by cannonballs. Quartermaster Ate Stinstra then took command of Kortenaer's ship.

All reports of the stage of the battle from late morning to midday are fragmentary. Although the English fleet had become disarranged through executing its tacking manoeuvres, the Dutch were in greater disarray and many Dutch ships failed to remain in a coherent line of battle. In theory, their being in a leeward position would have given the Dutch guns greater range, allowing them to destroy the rigging of the English ships from a safe distance with chain shot, but in reality the seven squadrons began to block each other's line of fire. In addition, those flag officers and captains most hungry for battle quickly left the less enthusiastic officers and older ships behind, while company ships were untrained in the tactics of fighting in formation. As far as can be established, Kortenaer's squadron led the Dutch fleet, ranged against Lawson, followed by Johan Evertsen and Obdam, who were mainly opposing Sandwich's squadron, with Tromp and Cornelis Evertsen towards the rear, facing Rupert. The ships of the Dutch fourth and seventh squadrons were scattered throughout the line, and most of the English Red Squadron formed a separate line to the west of the main area of combat, remaining almost out of range of Dutch gunfire for several hours. Around midday, Lawson's flagship, the Royal Oak, left the line having suffered significant damage, with Lawson himself wounded. He was quickly replaced by Joseph Jordan, who soon returned the flagship to lead its division.

=== Afternoon ===
The long gunnery contest continued until around 2pm, with the Dutch putting significant pressure on the English Blue Squadron, while holding their own elsewhere, because much of the Red Squadron was largely inactive. However, James and Penn began to send reinforcements to assist Sandwich around noon. The fiercest fighting of the early afternoon was between Obdam's and Sandwich's squadrons, the latter of which was concentrating its fire and heavily damaging the opposing Dutch ships. Obdam's flagship Eendracht and about five other large Dutch ships tried to break through Sandwich's squadron, and men from the giant Dutch East Indies ship Oranje under its captain Bastian Senten boarded and temporarily took over one of Sandwich's ships, the Montague. However James and Penn sent the Old James of 68 guns under Earl of Marlborough against the Oranje, whiled he and Penn sailed the Royal Charles against the Eendracht in support of Sandwich's flagship Prince Royal. These reinforcements forced Senten to recall his boarders and the Dutch to abandon their attempted breakthrough: this attempt and its repulse created considerable disorder among the Dutch ships. Both Sandwich, who was close to the centre of the action and, simultaneously but independently, Rupert further away, noticed the Dutch disarray, and embarked on attacks which were to decide the outcome of the battle. Sandwich attempted to break through the Dutch centre and four of the Dutch ships trying to oppose him ran into one another. As these ships failed to surrender, they were later attacked by an English fireship, and only one escaped being burned. Other Dutch ships retreated. To the north, Tromp and Cornelis Evertsen tried to seize the weather gage from Rupert, who retained it while continuing to inflict severe damage to his opponents.

While these two English attacks were taking place, the Duke of York attacked the Eendracht. A Dutch chain-shot from Obdam's flagship narrowly missed James and killed several of his courtiers on the Royal Charles, the Hon. Richard Boyle (son of Richard Boyle, 1st Earl of Burlington), Viscount Muskerry and the Earl of Falmouth. The last, who was untalented and little regarded was decapitated, leading the poet Andrew Marvell, using the pseudonym John Denham) to write a brutal epitaph: "His shattered head the fearless Duke disdains, and gave the last first proof that he had Brains". However, casualties on the Eendracht were even more severe, with Obdam being killed on its quarterdeck by a cannonball and, a few minutes after his death, at about 3pm, its magazine exploded without warning, destroying the ship and killing all but five of its crew. The loss of the flagship and death of its commander, just as the English Blue and White squadrons were attacking, seriously affected Dutch morale, which was further damaged by the uncertainty over his successor. The next most senior flag officer was Johan Evertsen of Zeeland, who was distrusted by the politicians of the dominant province of Holland, who had therefore nominated Egbert Kortenaer to be Obdam's successor before the battle. Kortenaer had been fatally wounded and was incapable of command, but Stinstra, his flag captain kept Kortenaer's flag as admiral of the third Squadron flying and, unnerved by the explosion of the Eendracht, he fled the battle, followed by many ships of that squadron, which assumed that they should follow their leader's flag. Seeing, as he thought, Kortenaer had abdicated his responsibility, Johan Evertsen raised a pendant showing he commanded the fleet, but Cornelis Tromp, the senior Amsterdam officer also raised a command pendant adding to the confusion, as three ships claimed to be fleet flagship.

By this stage, any semblance of lines of battle had disappeared, and the battle took on the appearance of a gigantic and shapeless mêlée, although the more aggressive English fleet was in fact forcing many of the Dutch ships, unnerved by the loss of the Eendracht or following Kortenaer's flag in the Groot Hollandia, to retreat. A complete Dutch rout was prevented only by what ships rallied to Evertsen or Tromp and the action of the Oranje, which fought off several opponents for around two hours until, shattered and sinking it surrendered and was burned. These Dutch forces allowed the bulk of their fleet, which had lost all cohesion by around 6pm, to gain a headstart on any English pursuit. During this stage, the Earl of Marlborough and the Earl of Portland were killed and the ships of Lawson's division of the Red Squadron and Teddiman's division of the Blue Squadron joined the main battle forcing more Dutch ships to retreat. Between 6pm and 9pm, the larger English ships concentrated, on forcing first Evertsen and then Tromp into retreat and mopping-up Dutch ships too damaged to escape, capturing three. Tromp later claimed that his rearguard action prevented greater losses, as many of the fleeing Dutch ships' crews were demoralised and would not fight any English pursuers. As Sandwich had broken through the Dutch fleet, it disintegrated in its flight into a number of separate bodies, escaping to different ports. Tromp led one group to Texel, followed by Rupert, Johan Evertsen retreated with another contingent to the Maas (French: Meuse) pursued by the rest of the English fleet, and other ships headed for the Scheldt. However, the English commanders did not order a general chase by releasing their faster ships to overtake the slower of the Dutch fugitives, but remained in squadron. At around 9pm, Sandwich even ordered his squadron to shorten sail so that the White Squadron could catch up and the Duke of York assume command.

Much more damaging, however, was the decision taken for the Royal Charles to reduce sail during the night. Significant controversy surrounds this incident, and several explanations have been proposed to explain it. An account which relies on the reported testimonies of Penn and Harman suggests that Lord Henry Brouncker, James' master of the bedchamber, either from fear or because he had promised the Duchess of York to keep the Duke from danger, first approached William Penn, the Captain of the Fleet asking him to slacken sail, reminding him that the Duke was heir presumptive and that his death would be a disaster. Penn refused, stating that only James could order this, but he then went below. Brouncker next approached the captain of the Royal Charles John Harman, this time pretending that the order to take in sail did come from James. When Royal Charles reduced sail in the course of the night, the rest of the English fleet followed suit. According to another account, Penn was said to have remarked that James, having narrowly escaped death in the battle, had lost his nerve completely. Brouncker later fled for his life rather than face a Parliamentary enquiry after the war, which could have condemned him. When, on the morning of 14 June, the fastest English frigates were sent ahead of the main fleet, they captured six Dutch ships, some of which defended themselves honourably, but others offered little resistance: these were in addition to three captures on the previous evening. The results of what had been a notable victory were less than might have been expected, firstly through the rearguard actions of Tromp and Johan Evertsen which allowed many Dutch ships to disengage from the battle and secondly the failure to release the faster frigates from the main fleet in pursuit of the fleeing Dutch, which could have been ordered as early as 6pm. These small but fast ships had taken little part in the main action, but their activities on the morning of 14 June showed what could have been achieved. The controversial slowing-down of the whole fleet at night simply exacerbated this earlier failure.

== Aftermath ==
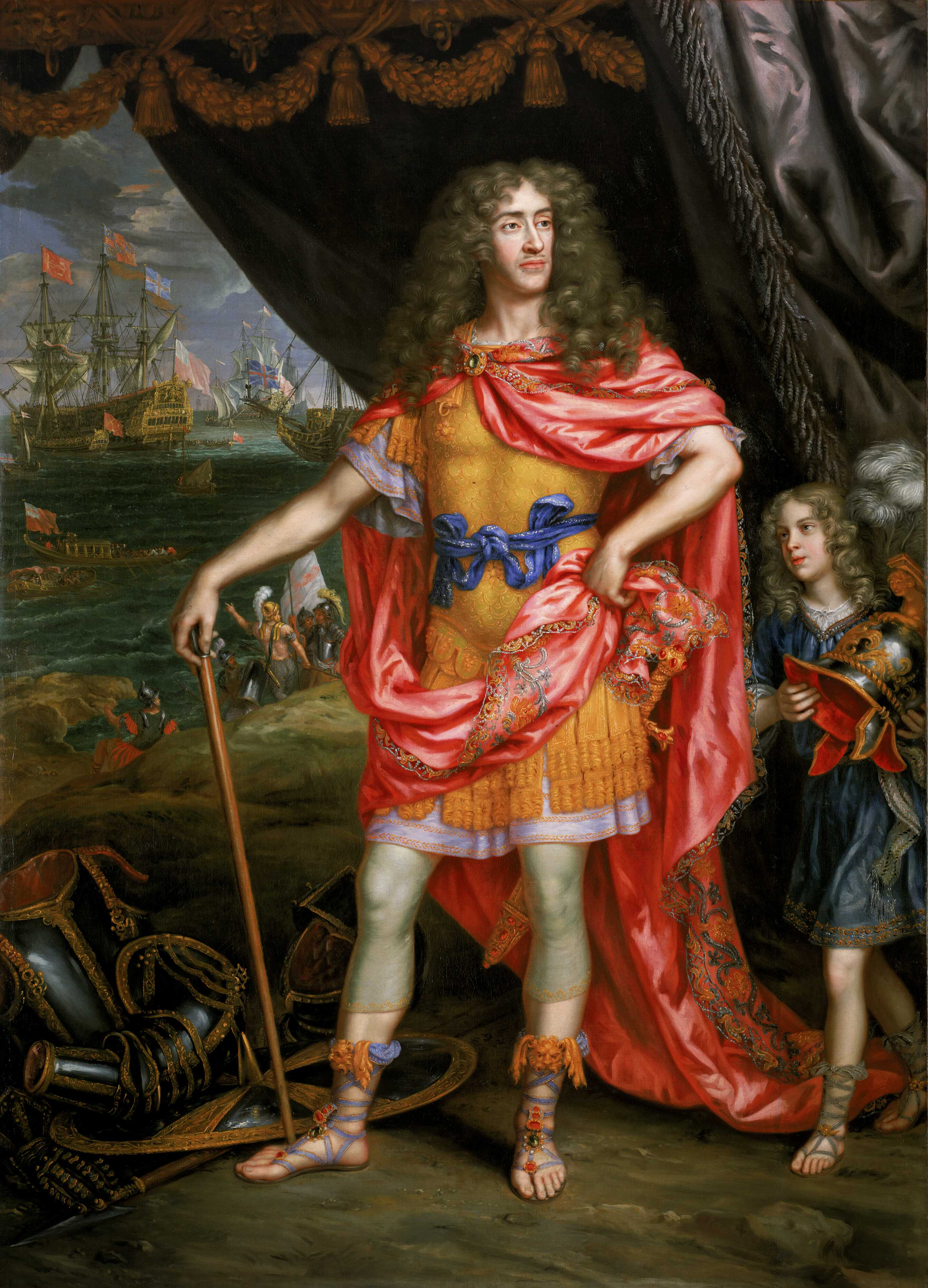
Portrait of James, Duke of York by Henri Gascar, 1673

The English lost only one ship, the captured Great Charity mentioned above. Eight Dutch ships were sunk by the English; six of these were burnt in two separate incidents when they got entangled while fleeing and each group was set ablaze by a fire ship: this happened to the Tergoes entangling with the company ship Maarseveen and the merchantman Swanenburg; also to the Koevorden, the Stad Utrecht and the Prinse Maurits. The earlier mentioned company ship Oranje was set on fire after being reduced to a wreck when fighting off several English ships. The first to attack was one of the Duke of York's squadron, the Mary under captain Jeremiah Smith, which lost 99 men of its crew in this action, followed later by the Royal Oak, the Essex and the Royal Katherine. According to some accounts, the Oranje lost half of its crew of 400 before succumbing, a severely wounded Senten (rumoured to be an expatriate Scotsman) was picked up by an English vessel and shortly after he also died. During the Dutch flight, the English captured nine more ships: Hilversum, Delft, Zeelandia, Wapen van Edam and Jonge Prins; the VOC-ship Nagelboom and the merchants Carolus Quintus, Mars and Geldersche Ruyter. Tromp was captured but escaped. Eight older ships had to be written off later, as the costs of repairing them would have exceeded their value. The English fleet had lost one flag officer, Rear-Admiral Robert Samsun during the battle, while Vice-Admiral Lawson was mortally wounded and died three weeks after the battle. Notable English admirals and captains present at the battle included William Penn in the Royal Charles, Christopher Myngs and George Ayscue.

The escape of most of the Dutch fleet was more significant than its losses, as only its destruction as a fighting force would have given England the early victory it needed. That possibility became more remote as senior Dutch sea officers and politicians began to consider the reasons for the disaster at Lowestoft and identified three principal causes. The first was the lack of discipline that was dealt with by severely punishing the worst offenders while rewarding success. The second was tactical, as the favoured Dutch tactic of the undisciplined mêlée, with individual ships boarding and capturing their opponent and, in many cases, leaving the battle with their prize, was ineffective against English gunnery on ships fighting in line. Although de Ruyter did partially revert to mêlée tactics in the last day of the Four Days Battle., fighting in line became the standard tactic in new Fighting Instructions approved by the States General in August 1665. The final cause was the inferiority of Dutch ships which, though well-constructed, were generally smaller and more lightly armed than those of other maritime nations. Although there had been a significant building programme after the First Anglo-Dutch War, only Eendracht and Groot Hollandia, built as fleet flagship, were comparable to English ships of the third-rate. Although from 1660 the Dutch embarked on an expansion programme, many were smaller ships and only one exceeded the size of the Eendracht, equaling an English second-rate. This building programme was greatly expanded after the outbreak of the war, but none of its ships had been completed by the time of Lowestoft. Compared with the Dutch fleet at the Four Days' Battle in June 1666, Obdam had a fleet comprising many older and smaller vessels and fewer modern ones. It relied strongly on the East Indies Company's ships and other merchantmen, although these did not have the resilience of true warships. There were no East Indies Company ships in the battles of 1666, and the few merchant ships present were not in the line of battle but acted as auxiliaries.

Although Tromp and Evertsen were ordered by the commissioners from the States General to return to sea with as many ships as possible, in the recriminations that followed the battle, Tromp refused, denouncing a number of captains for disobedience or cowardice and the States General formed a commission to inspect the ships and question the captains of those that seemed to have suffered little damage. Although about two dozen ships showed were found to have suffered little damage, only ten captains were charged with cowardice Nine captains were brought to trial: three were shot before the fleet, three exiled and three dismissed from their commands. A tenth captain, Laurens Heemskerck, who had fled from the Netherlands in 1665, fearing he would be tried for cowardice in the battle, was afterwards condemned in absentia to perpetual banishment from the Netherlands. Heemskerck assisted England in planning the attack on the Vlie and later, in 1672, fought on the French side against his countrymen at the Battle of Solebay. Although there was considerable dissatisfaction with the conduct of a number of ships' crews, the States General did not investigate these, considering that the fault lay with their captains. There were also disputes about who should be promoted to fill the places of the two deceased admirals. The Dutch attempted to learn lessons from their defeat. The Admiralty of Zeeland instructed its flag officers and captains to avoid lengthy and disadvantageous gun battles and to practice drills aimed at boarding and capturing enemy ships. In August 1665 the deputies of the States General in discussion with Tromp and other admirals issued revised combat instruction that became the basis of Dutch naval tactics for the rest of the Second Anglo-Dutch War and for the Third Anglo-Dutch War. The main points of these instruction were the division of the fleet into three distinct squadrons, each with a clear chain of command, improved signalling and the application of the principle of the concentration of superior force against part of the enemy fleet. These instructions implicitly criticised the division of the fleet at Lowestoft into seven squadrons with unclear chains of command but also Obdam's cautious tactics.

== See also ==
- Flagmen of Lowestoft
- Glossary of nautical terms : (A–L), (M–Z)

== Bibliography ==
- Bruijn, Jaap R. (2011). The Dutch Navy of the Seventeenth and Eighteenth Centuries. Oxford University Press. ISBN 978-0-98649-735-3
- Fox, Frank L. (2018). The Four Days' Battle of 1666. Seaforth. ISBN 978-1-52673-727-4.
- Rommelse, Gijs. (2006). The Second Anglo-Dutch War (1665-1667): Raison D'état, Mercantilism and Maritime Strife. Uitgeverij Verloren. ISBN 978-9-065-50907-9.
- Van der Aa, A. J. (1867). Biographische Woordenboek der Nederlandenen. Allart.
- Warnsinck, J. C. M. (1942) Van Vloot Voogden en Zeeslagen. Kampen & Zoon
- Weigley, Russel Frank (2004), The Age of Battles: The Quest for Decisive Warfare from Breitenfeld to Waterloo, Bloomington: Indiana University Press, ISBN 978-0-25321-707-3
- Prud'homme van Reine, Ronald Boudewijn (2001). Schittering en Schandaal. Dubbelbiografie van Maerten en Cornelis Tromp [Brilliance and Scandal. Double biography of Maerten and Cornelis Tromp] (in Dutch). Arbeiderspers. ISBN 978-90-295-3572-4.
