= Battle of Portland =

1653 battle of the First Anglo-Dutch War

Coordinates: 50.4°N 2.5°W

- Part of the First Anglo-Dutch War
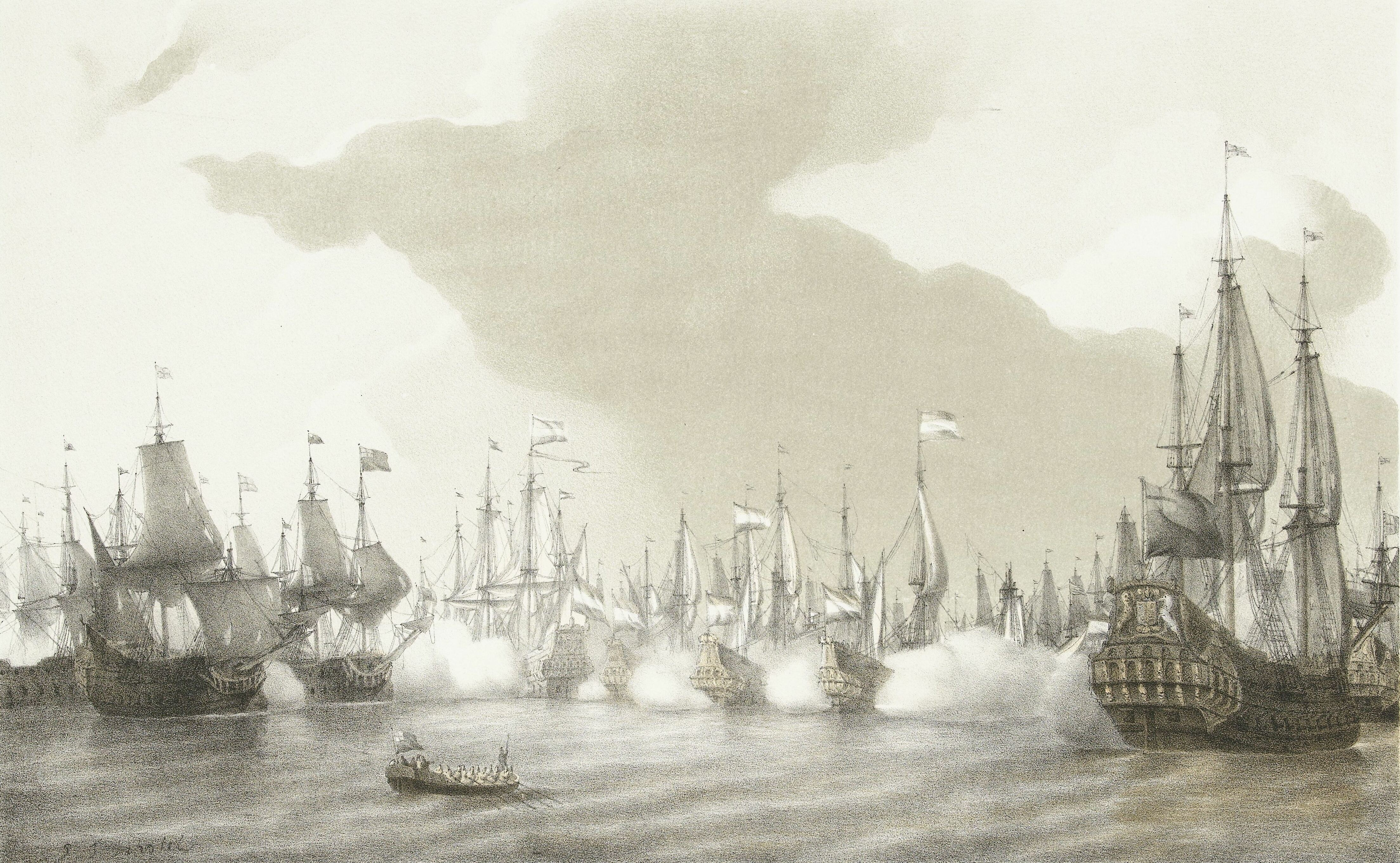
- Three Days Battle, 1653; Petrus Johannes Schotel, c. 1850
Date	28 February – 2 March 1653
Location	Off Isle of Portland, English Channel
Result	English victory

Belligerents
Commonwealth of England	Dutch Republic

Commanders and leaders
(The Protectorate) Robert Blake (The Protectorate) Benjamin Blake (The Protectorate) Richard Deane	Maarten Tromp

Strength
80 warships 12,000 men 2,800 guns	80 warships 8,600 men 2,450 guns

Casualties and losses
3 warships sunk	12 warships sunk

The naval Battle of Portland, or Three Days' Battle, took place during 18–20 February 1653 (28 February – 2 March 1653 (Gregorian calendar)), (Note: During this period in English history dates of events are usually recorded in the Julian calendar, while those the Netherlands are recorded in the Gregorian calendar. In this article dates are in the Julian calendar with the start of the year adjusted to 1 January (see Old Style and New Style dates).) during the First Anglo-Dutch War, when the fleet of the Commonwealth of England under General at Sea Robert Blake was attacked by a fleet of the Dutch Republic under Lieutenant-Admiral Maarten Tromp escorting merchant shipping through the English Channel.

The battle failed to settle supremacy of the English Channel, although both sides claimed victory, and ultimate control over the Channel would only be decided at the Battle of the Gabbard which allowed the English to blockade the Dutch coast until the Battle of Scheveningen, where Admiral Maarten Tromp was killed in a firefight.

== Background ==
The First Anglo-Dutch War was caused by friction between the two naval powers of the century, competing for strategic supremacy over the world's merchant routes. England and the United Provinces had always been 'natural allies' against the Habsburgs, as deemed by the Council of State under the rule of Charles I. It has been argued that had Charles I stayed in power the war between the two nations would have never sprung, as he would never have obtained the necessary funding from parliament. However, the rise of the English Parliament under Oliver Cromwell saw the deterioration of diplomacy between the two as the Dutch stadtholder financially supported the Royalists. During the English Civil War, the Dutch had taken advantage of the internal strife within their neighbours, and greatly expanded their maritime presence throughout the world's merchant harbours and routes, ultimately even challenging English control in its colonies, and the Dutch even boasted of driving all nations out of the sea. Nonetheless, Cromwell did not challenge the Dutch, still consolidating his power at home.

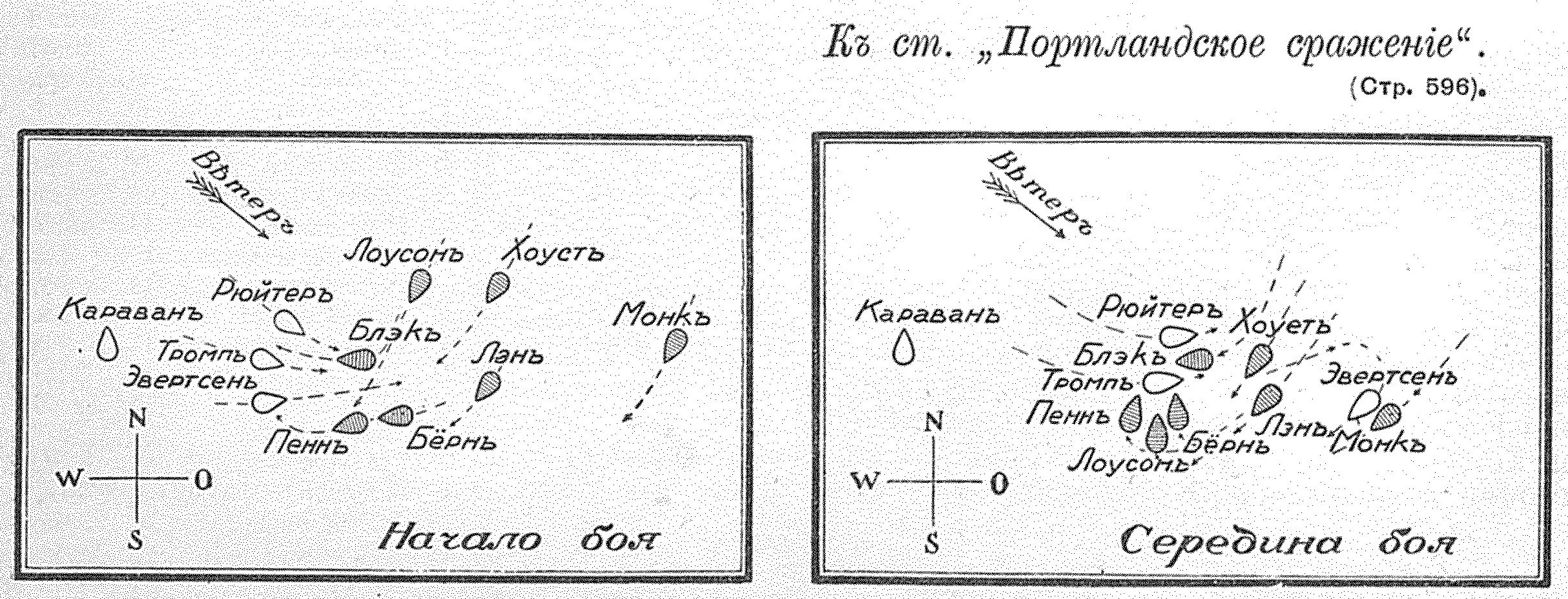
Battle of Portland

This changed when Parliamentary armies finally routed the Royalists at the Battle of Worcester, effectively ending the English Civil War. With Cromwell fully in power, the Parliament passed the Navigation Act 1651, requiring all goods destined to English ports to be transported by English ships, which impacted part of the Dutch ability to trade, since they were cut off from all of England's colonies in the Americas and elsewhere. Later that year the Parliament gave an order which allowed privateers and warships to seize Dutch shipping. Parliament began to enforce its sovereignty over the "British Seas", which granted the Royal Navy dominion from the North Sea to Cape Finisterre. The translation of Parliament's words into action came when Sir George Ayscue folded Barbados into the Commonwealth and seized 27 Dutch merchantmen.

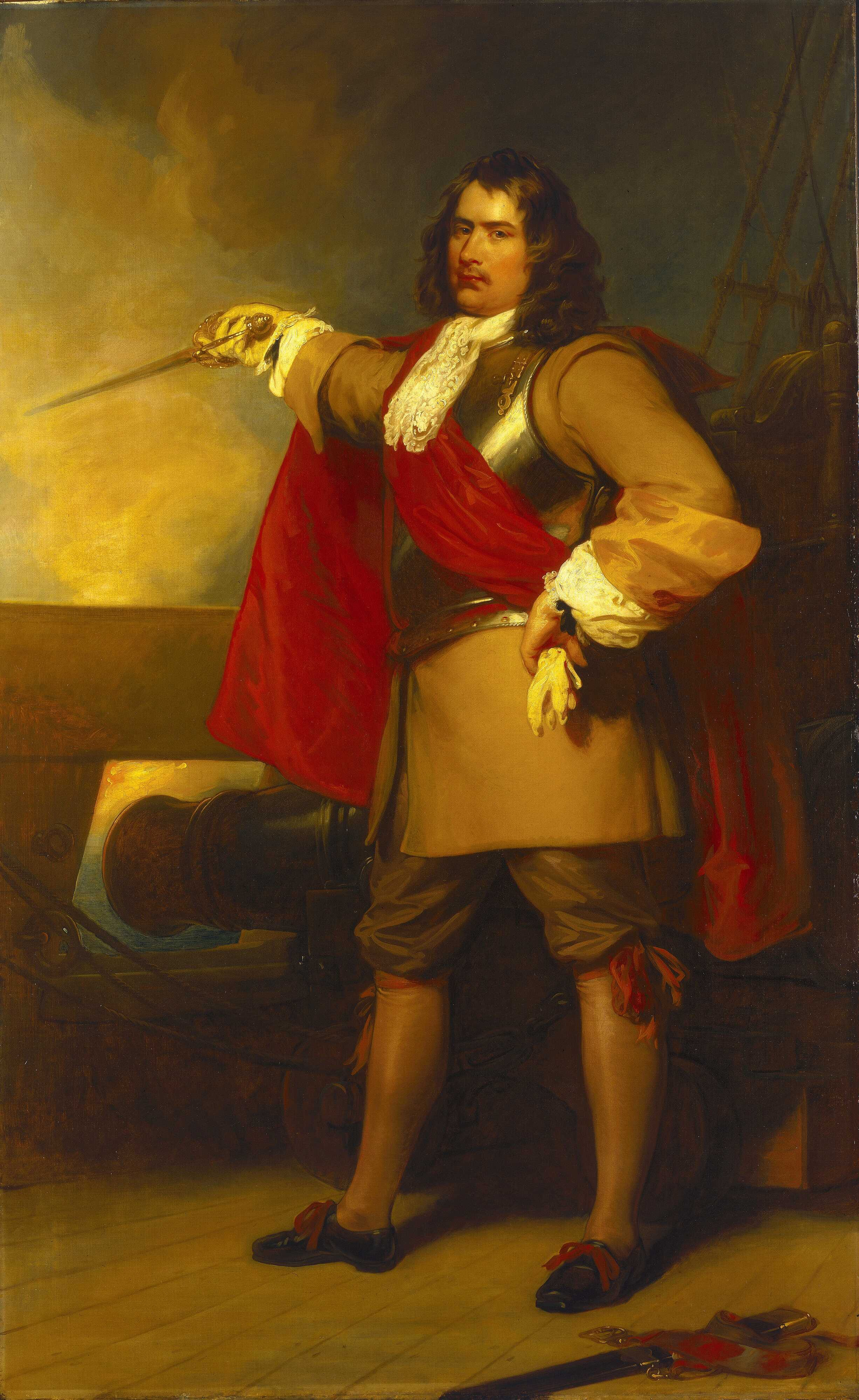
Robert Blake, General at Sea, 1599–1657 by Henry Perronet Briggs, painted 1829.

The Dutch response was divided; the moderate States of Holland pursued a policy of appeasement; but when the negotiations failed and the Navigation Acts were adopted the ferocious Orangist faction became more powerful, and the States General passed a resolution which would allow the Dutch war fleet, to be tripled in size, to protect Dutch interest over the areas in question. This fleet was put under the command of Admiral Maarten Tromp, who had defeated the sixth and final Spanish Armada at the Battle of the Downs, 31 October 1639. That same year, the Dutch signed a treaty with Denmark with the intent to hurt English trade routs. War finally broke out after a confrontation between admirals Robert Blake and Maarten Tromp, May 1652, at the Battle of Dover.

Minor skirmishes followed at the Battle of Plymouth, the Battle of Elba, and the Battle of Kentish Knock. The two fleets met for the first time in a major battle at the Battle of Dungeness, November 1652. The battle turned out to be a failure for the English, forcing them to rethink their naval strategy, led by Admiral Sir Henry Vane and an Admiralty Committee, including developing a tactic that would mark naval warfare for the following century. Taking a page out of the Dutch book the English reorganised each fleet into squadrons for greater tactical control. In fact, the tactic, renamed the line-of-battle tactic, would remain key to English/British naval strategy until the end of the Second World War. The two fleets would meet again off Portland.

== Battle ==
During the first days of February 1653, Tromp escorted a convoy of merchant ships through the Channel and put them safely into the Atlantic Ocean. He set to return to his home port, but first anchored off La Rochelle to repair and resupply his ships and waited for expected merchantmen coming from the Atlantic. He attempted to set sail on 20 February with 152 merchantmen, but was held back for three days by high winds and rough seas. On 24 February Tromp finally set sail, entering the area off Portland four days later where he spotted Blake's fleet attempting to cut them off. Immediately, Tromp set the signal for a general attack and began the offensive with the wind in his favour as he had the weather gauge.

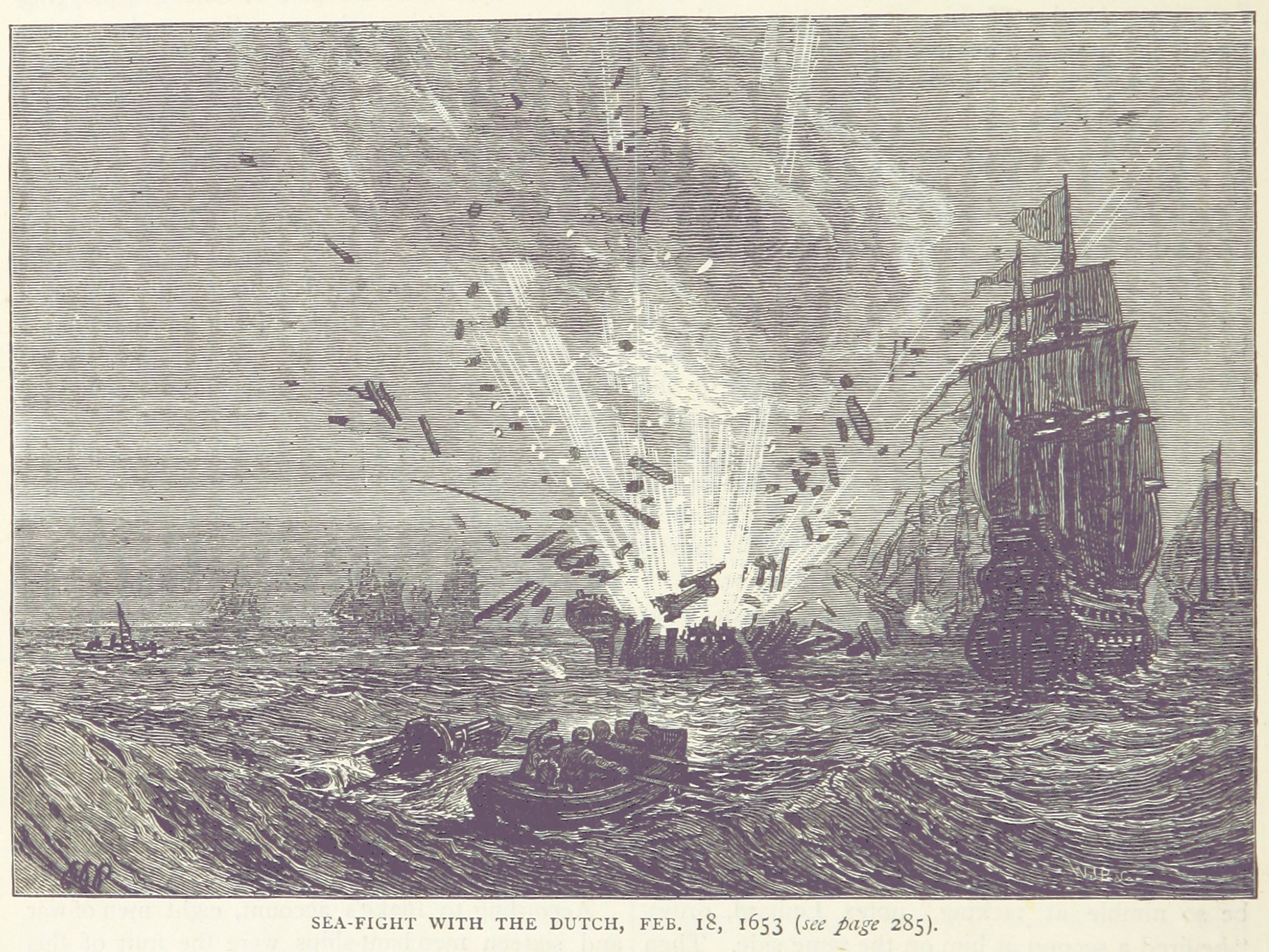
An illustration of the battle

Tromp's flagship, Brederode, met Blake's flagship, Triumph, immediately, sending a broadside at mere metres distance. Turning around, without having received a response from English gunners, he put a second broadside in Triumph's other side, and finally then delivered a third after turning around again. Blake subsequently veered away and decided to fight at long range. Dutch Commodore De Ruyter was able to attack the English rear and engaged the largest English vessel in the fleet, Prosperity, ending in a boarding attempt which was repulsed by the crew of the English vessel the first time around. A second boarding attempt forced the Prosperity to surrender thereafter, however. An attempt to reclaim the ship surrounded De Ruyter, but after an intense fight the Dutch commodore was able to fight his way out. The battle continued for the day with heavy fire exchanged by both sides. Later on 28 February Blake sent a squadron of frigates to intercept and claim the Dutch merchantmen off the coast of La Rochelle. Tromp quickly responded by sending his own captains to intercept the English. Nonetheless, night brought a close to the day's battle.

The following day the English were the first to begin the engagement, with the wind in their favour. The initiative of the English fleet was not gone from the previous day, but five attempts failed to break the Dutch line. The day also saw 12 Dutch merchantmen caught by Blake's frigates after attempting to make a run for it, against Tromp's explicit orders. After the second day most of the Dutch warships were out of powder and shot, and there was none to resupply with.

The third day ended just the same, with a failure to break the Dutch line. Several Dutch captains attempted to flee after completely running out of ammunition but Tromp ended their flight with a few shots across their ships. The battle ended for the day when Blake drew off, after forcing the Dutch to fight to the point where they only had around half an hour worth of shot left. Blake's reasoning for the disengagement has been attributed to the fact that he received a wound to the thigh that day.

On the fourth day the English again attempted to resume action, but they found the sea empty of Dutch warships. Tromp had guided the remainder of his fleet along the coastline, escaping certain defeat the next day, leaving 12 warships and a number of merchantmen behind. Although both sides claimed victory after the battle, the fact remains that it was Tromp who left the field, not Blake, and in the end, it was Blake who was able to commandeer 20 to 40 Dutch merchantmen and at least eight Dutch warships back to his homeport.

== Aftermath ==
The Battle of Portland restored English control over the English Channel. While Dutch propaganda tried to paint the battle as a Dutch victory or a "glorious defeat" and the populace publicly rejoiced at the heroism shown, Admiral Tromp and the other flag officers knew better, all coming home in an extremely dark mood. They concluded that the adoption of line tactics by the English would make it impossible for the Dutch to compensate inferior firepower with better seamanship and they urged the States-General to finally start building real heavy warships instead of replacing losses by recruiting armed merchants. In an attempt to at least keep the North Sea open, an under-equipped Dutch fleet engaged the English again at the Battle of the Gabbard.

== Sources ==
- The Anglo-Dutch Wars of the 17th Century, C.R. Boxer
- The High Seas Battle of Portland, Keith Milton, Military History
- Blok, P.J. (1928). Michiel de Ruyter (PDF) (in Dutch). Martinus Nijhof.
