= English ship Assistance (1650) =

Ship of the line of the Royal Navy

History

Commonwealth of England
- Name: Assistance
- Ordered: December 1649
- Builder: Henry Johnson, Deptford
- Launched: 1650
- Commissioned: 1650
- Honours and awards: Kentish Knock 1652; Portland 1653; Gabbard 1653; Porto Farina 1655; Santa Cruz 1657

Kingdom of England
- Name: Assistance
- Acquired: Restoration May 1660
- Honours and awards: Lowestoft 1665; Vagen 1665; Four Days' Battle 1666; Orfordness 1666; Martinique 1667

Great Britain
- Acquired: 1707 Act of Union
- Fate: Sunk as breakwater 14 December 1745

General characteristics as built
- Class & type: 50-gun Fourth-rate
- Tons burthen: 513 26/94 tons bm
- Length: 121 ft 0 in (36.9 m) gundeck; 101 ft 6 in (30.9 m) keel for tonnage
- Beam: 30 ft 10 in (9.4 m)
- Draught: 15 ft 6 in (4.7 m)
- Depth of hold: 15 ft 5 in (4.7 m)
- Sail plan: ship-rigged
- Complement: 180 in 1653; 170 in 1666
- Armament: 40 guns 1653; 46 guns 1666; 22 × culverins (LD); 20 × demi-culverins (UD); 4 × sakers (QD) (2 sakers added in 1677); 50 guns in 1685; 22 × culverins (LD); 22 × demi-culverins (UD); 6 × sakers (QD)

General characteristics after 1687 rebuild
- Class & type: 48-gun Fourth-rate
- Tons burthen: 567 20/94 tons bm
- Length: 121 ft 5.5 in (37.0 m) (gundeck); 102 ft 0 in (31.1 m) keel for tonnage
- Beam: 32 ft 4 in (9.9 m)
- Depth of hold: 13 ft 0 in (4.0 m)
- Sail plan: ship-rigged
- Armament: 42 guns in 1688; 20 × culverins (drakes) (LD); 18 × demi-culverins (UD); 4 × sakers cutts (QD); 46 guns in 1696 survey; 17 × culverins (LD); 21 × demi-culverins (UD); 8 × sakers (QD)

General characteristics after 1699 rebuild
- Class & type: 50/44-gun Fourth-rate
- Tons burthen: 607 62/94 tons bm
- Length: 119 ft 7 in (36.4 m) (gundeck); 103 ft 4 in (31.5 m) keel for tonnage
- Beam: 33 ft 3 in (10.1 m)
- Depth of hold: 12 ft 0 in (3.7 m)
- Sail plan: ship-rigged
- Armament: 50/44 guns 1703 establishment; 20/18 × 12-pounder guns (LD); 20/18 × 6-pounder guns (UD); 6/4 × 6-pounder guns (QD); 2 × 6-pounder guns (Fc)

General characteristics after 1710-13 rebuild
- Class & type: 1706 Establishment 50-gun Fourth-rate
- Tons burthen: 709 65/94 tons bm
- Length: 132 ft 1.5 in (40.3 m) gundeck; 108 ft 11 in (33.2 m) keel for tonnage
- Beam: 35 ft 0 in (10.7 m)
- Depth of hold: 14 ft 0.5 in (4.3 m)
- Propulsion: Sails
- Sail plan: ship-rigged
- Complement: 285 (wartime); 185 (peacetime)
- Armament: 50 guns; 22/18 × 12-pounder guns (LD); 22/18 × 6-pounder guns (UD); 8/6 × 6-pounder guns (QD); 2 × 6-pounder guns (Fc)

General characteristics after 1720-26 rebuild
- Class & type: 1719 Establishment 50-gun Fourth-rate
- Tons burthen: 750 17/94 tons bm
- Length: 134 ft 0 in (40.8 m) gundeck; 109 ft 8 in (33.4 m) Keel for tonnage
- Beam: 36 ft 1.5 in (11.0 m)
- Depth of hold: 15 ft 2 in (4.6 m)
- Propulsion: Sails
- Sail plan: ship-rigged
- Complement: 285 personnel
- Armament: 50 guns: 22 × 18-pounder guns (LD); 22 × 9-pounder guns (UD); 4 × 6-pounder guns (QD); 2 × 6-pounder guns (Fc)

The Assistance was one of six 40-gun fourth-rate frigates, ordered in December 1649 and built for the Commonwealth of England under the 1650 Programme; the others were the Foresight, Pelican, Reserve, Advice and Centurion. After the Restoration of the monarchy in 1660 she was incorporated into the navy of the Kingdom of England. During her time in the Commonwealth Navy she partook in the First Anglo-Dutch War being present in the battles of Kentish Knock, Portland and The Gabbard. In the Mediterranean she was present at the Battle of Santa Cruz and the bombardment of Porto Farina, In the Second Anglo-Dutch War she was involved in the Battle of Lowestoft, Battle of Vagen and the St James Day Fight. She did not participate in fleet actions after this. She spent the rest of her service life undergoing several rebuilds and plying the waters as a cruiser protecting British trade and projecting British sovereignty. After nearly 95 years of Service she was sunk as a break water at Sheerness at the end of 1745.

Assistance was the first named vessel in the English and Royal Navy.

== Construction and specifications ==
She was ordered in December 1649 to be built under contract at Deptford by Master Shipwright Henry Johnson. She was launched in 1650. Her dimensions were gundeck 121 feet 0 inches (36.9 metres) with 101 feet 6 inches (30.9 metres) keel for tonnage with a breadth of 30 feet 10 inches (9.4 metres) and a depth of hold of 15 feet 5 inches (4.7 metres). Her tonnage was 513 26/94 tons. She was remeasured at a later date and her dimensions changed to gundeck 121 feet 5 inches (37.0 metres) with 102 feet 0 inches (31.1 metres) keel for tonnage with a breadth of 32 feet 4 inches (9.9 metres) and a depth of hold of 13 feet 0 inches (4.0 metres). Her tonnage was 567 tons. Her mean draught was 15 feet 6 inches (4.7 metres).

Her gun armament in 1653 was 40 guns. In 1666 her armament was 46 guns and consisted of twenty-two culverins (Note: The culverin was a gun of 4,500 pounds with a 5.5-inch bore firing a 17.5-pound shot with a twelve-pound powder charge) on the lower deck (LD), twenty demi-culverins (Note: The demi-culverin was a gun of 3,400 pounds with a four-inch bore firing a 9.5-pound shot with an eight-pound powder charge) on the upper deck, four sakers (Note: The sacar or saker was a gun of 1,400 pounds with a 3.5-inch bore firing a 4-pound shot with a 4-pound powder charge) on the quarterdeck (QD). In 1677 she had 2 more sakers added bringing her gun total to 48 guns. In 1685 her guns were established at 50 guns. She now carried twenty-two culverins, twenty-two demi-culverins and six sakers. Her manning was 180 personnel in 1653 and 170 in 1666.

She was completed with a first cost of £3,386.10.0d (Note: The cost accounting for inflation of approximately £589,700 in reference to today) or 522 tons @ £6.10.0d (Note: The cost accounting for inflation of approximately £1,100 in reference to today) per ton.

== Commissioned service ==
=== Service in the Commonwealth Navy ===
She was commissioned in 1650 under the command of Captain John Bourne for service at the Downs and the east coast of England.

==== First Anglo-Dutch War ====
England declared war on 30 June 1652. Her first battle was the Battle of Kentish Knock where she was a member of Rear-Admiral Nehemiah Bourne's Squadron on 28 September 1652. Her next fight was at the Battle of Portland on 18 February 1653 as Flagship of Rear Admiral John Bourne, Rear-Admiral of the Blue. She was taken briefly by the Dutch but was quickly recaptured. Later in 1653 she was under command of Captain William Crispin. She was at the Battle of the Gabbard as a member White Squadron, Center Division on 2–3 June 1653. Her last battle of the war was the Battle of Scheveningen off Texel as a member White Squadron, Center Division on 31 July 1653. She then spent the winter of 1653/54 in the Western Approaches. on 5 (or 8) April 1654 the war was concluded with the 1st Treaty of Westminster.

In 1654 she was under the command of Captain Thomas Sparling until 1660. In 1659 she was on operations in the Sound.

=== Service after the Restoration May 1660 ===
On 20 May 1661 she was Captain Edward Wye With the Earl of Sandwich's Squadron in the Straits. On 10 April 1662 Captain William Berkeley took over after the death of Captain Wye on the 9th. Captain Zachary Brown took command on 15 September 1664.

==== Second Anglo-Dutch War ====
She partook in the Battle of Lowestoft as a Blue Squadron, Rear Division on 3 June 1665. One year later she partook in the Four Days' Battle as a Blue Squadron, Van Division from 1 to 4 June 1666. On 25 July 1666 as a member White Squadron, Center Division she participated in the St James Day Battle. She sailed with Rear-Admiral Sir John Harmon's Squadron for the West Indies. She was involved in the attack on Martinique on 24/25 June 1667. The Second Anglo-Dutch war ended on 31 July 1667.

On 1 January 1671 Captain John Hubbard II took command. she was in action against the Algerines resulting in the death of Captain Hubbard on 19 July 1671. On 20 August 1871 Captain John Wilgress took over until his death on 9 September 1671, then in 1672 Captain Ralph Lesselles (possibly). Captain Richard Munden held command from 7 January 1673 until 7 November 1674. During his command she was at the recapture of St Helena in May 1673. She returned to Home Waters in late 1674. On 15 May 1675 she was under Captain William Houlding with Narborough's Squadron in the Mediterranean. Captain Thomas Gardner held command from 5 November 1677 until his death on 13 April 1679. During this time she was in the English Channel and later moved to the Mediterranean. On 13 June 1679 she was under Captain James Barber until 4 December 1679. From 18 May 1680 until 27 July 1682 Captain Sir Robert Robinson held command for service in Newfoundland. In 1687 she was taken in hand for a rebuilt at Deptford.

=== Rebuild at Deptford 1687 ===
She was rebuilt by Robert & John Castle of Deptford in 1687. She was floated out of dock in late 1687. Her dimensions were gundeck 121 feet 5.5 inches (37.0 metres) with 102 feet 0 inches (31.1 metres) keel for tonnage with a breadth of 32 feet 4 inches (9.9 metres) and a depth of hold of 15 feet 0 inches (4.6 metres). Her tonnage was 567 20/94 tons.

Her gun armament in 1688 was 40 guns and consisted of twenty culverins (drakes) (Note: Drakes are a lightweight cannon that fired mainly grapeshot) on the lower deck (LD), eighteen demi-culverines on the upper deck, four saker cutts (Note: The cutt was a gun that had been shortened due to damage) on the quarterdeck (QD). Under a 1696 survey her guns were 46 guns. She now carried seventeen culverins, twenty-one demi-culverins and eight sakers.

=== Service after 1687 Rebuild ===
She was commissioned in July 1687 under Captain Lawrence Wright until 1689. In 1690 she was under Captain Richard Keigwin in the West Indies. Captain Keigwin died on 21 June 1690. She was under Captain Francis Maynard through 1691/92. in 1693 Captain Phineas Bowles took command for a Newfoundland convoy. Captain Edward Littlejohn took command in 1694 for the English Channel and cruising. During 1695/96 she was under Captain Thomas Robinson for service in the North Sea. Captain James Davidson in 1697 escorted a convoy to Iceland. In 1700 she was taken in hand for a rebuilt at Deptford.

=== Rebuild at Deptford Dockyard 1699 ===
She was ordered on 29 April 1699 to be rebuilt at Deptford Dockyard under the guidance of Master Shipwright Samuel Miller. She was floated out of dock in 1699. Her dimensions were gundeck 119 feet 7 inches (36.4 metres) with 103 feet 4 inches (31.5 metres) keel for tonnage with a breadth of 33 feet 3 inches (10.1 metres) and a depth of hold of 12 feet 0 inches (3.7 metres). Her tonnage was 607 62/94 tons.

Her gun armament in accordance with the 1703 establishment was 48 guns and consisted of twenty/eighteen 12-pounder guns on the lower deck (LD), twenty/eighteen 6-pounder guns on the upper deck, four 6-pounder guns on the quarterdeck (QD) and two 6-pounder guns on the foc's'le (Fc).

=== Service after 1699 Rebuild ===
She was commissioned in 1701 under the command of Captain John Graydon. In 1702 she was under Captain Robert Arris and sailed with Commodore John Leake's squadron to Newfoundland at the outbreak of the War of the Spanish Succession. Commodore Leake sent her to destroy the fortifications of the isle of Saint Pierre. Captain John Edwards was in command between 1703 and 1705. She was in the North Sea in 1705. From 1706 to 1707 she went to Jamaica under the command of Captain Barrow Harris. In July 1708 she was under Captain Caesar Brooks. 1709 she had a new commander, Captain Abraham Tudor until he was killed in action against Duguay-Trouin's Squadron on 2 March 1709. Later in the year she was commanded by Captain William Gray. In 1712 she was sent to Limehouse for another rebuilding.

=== Rebuild at Limehouse 1712 ===
She was ordered on 15 October 1710 to be rebuilt by William Johnson of Limehouse on the River Thames. Her keel was laid on 23 June 1710 and launched on 16 February 1713. She was completed around March 1713 at Deptford Dockyard. Her dimensions were gundeck 132 feet 1.5 inches (40.3 metres) with 108 feet 11 inches (33.2 metres) keel for tonnage with a breadth of 35 feet 0 inches (10.7 metres) and a depth of hold of 14 feet 0.5 inches (4.3 metres). Her tonnage was 709 65/94 tons.

Her gun armament in accordance with the 1706 establishment was 50 guns and consisted of twenty-two/eighteen 12-pounder guns on the lower deck (LD), twenty-two/eighteen 6-pounder guns on the upper deck, 8/6 6-pounder guns on the quarterdeck (QD) and two 6-pounder guns on the foc's'le (Fc).

=== Service after 1713 Rebuild ===
She was commissioned in 1714 under the command of Captain Edward Vernon for Norris's Fleet in the Baltic. During the Winter of 1716/17 she took Ambassador to Turkey. In 1719 she was under the command of Captain Edward Holland for service with Norris's Fleet in the Baltic. On her return she was sent to Woolwich to be dismantled for rebuilding.

=== Rebuild at Woolwich Dockyard 1720-25 ===
She was ordered on 27 January 1720 to be rebuilt at Woolwich Dockyard under the guidance of Master Shipwright John Hayward. Her keel was laid in January 1721 and launched on 25 November 1725. She was completed for sea on 9 March 1726. Her dimensions were gundeck 134 feet 0 inches (40.8 metres) with 109 feet 8 inches (33.4 metres) keel for tonnage with a breadth of 36 feet 1 inch (11.0 metres) and a depth of hold of 15 feet 2 inches (4.6 metres). Her tonnage was 750 17/94 tons.

Her gun armament in accordance with the 1706 establishment was 50 guns and consisted of twenty-two 18-pounder guns on the lower deck (LD), twenty-two 9-pounder guns on the upper deck, four 6-pounder guns on the quarterdeck (QD) and two 6-pounder guns on the foc's'le (Fc).

=== Service after 1720-25 Rebuild ===
She was commissioned in 1726 under the command of Captain Nicholas Eaton for Wager's Fleet in the Baltic. Later in the fall she was under Captain George Proctor with Wager's Fleet in the Straits of Gibraltar in 1727. She was fitted as a guardship in 1728. In 1728 she was under Captain Thomas Graves as guardship a Plymouth from 1728 through 1730. During 1729 she was prepared for service in the Mediterranean. She underwent a small repair at a cost of 1,850.10.2d (Note: The cost accounting for inflation of approximately £401,100 in reference to today) at Plymouth from May to June 1732. She recommissioned in 1738 under Captain John Wynnell for service in Home Waters. In 1740 she was under Captain John Russel with Haddock's Fleet in the Mediterranean in March 1740 then Norris's Fleet from July to September 1740. Captain Roger Martin took command in 1741 for service with Norris's Fleet in 1741. She went to Jamaica under Captain Smith Callis in 1742. She was at La Guayra on 18 February 1743 and at Porto Cabello on the 16th and 24 April 1744. She was ordered Home to pay off in 1745.

== Disposition ==
After nearly 95 years of service she sunk as a breakwater at Sheerness by Admiralty Order (AO) 10 January 1746 on 14 December 1745
