= English ship Foresight (1650) =

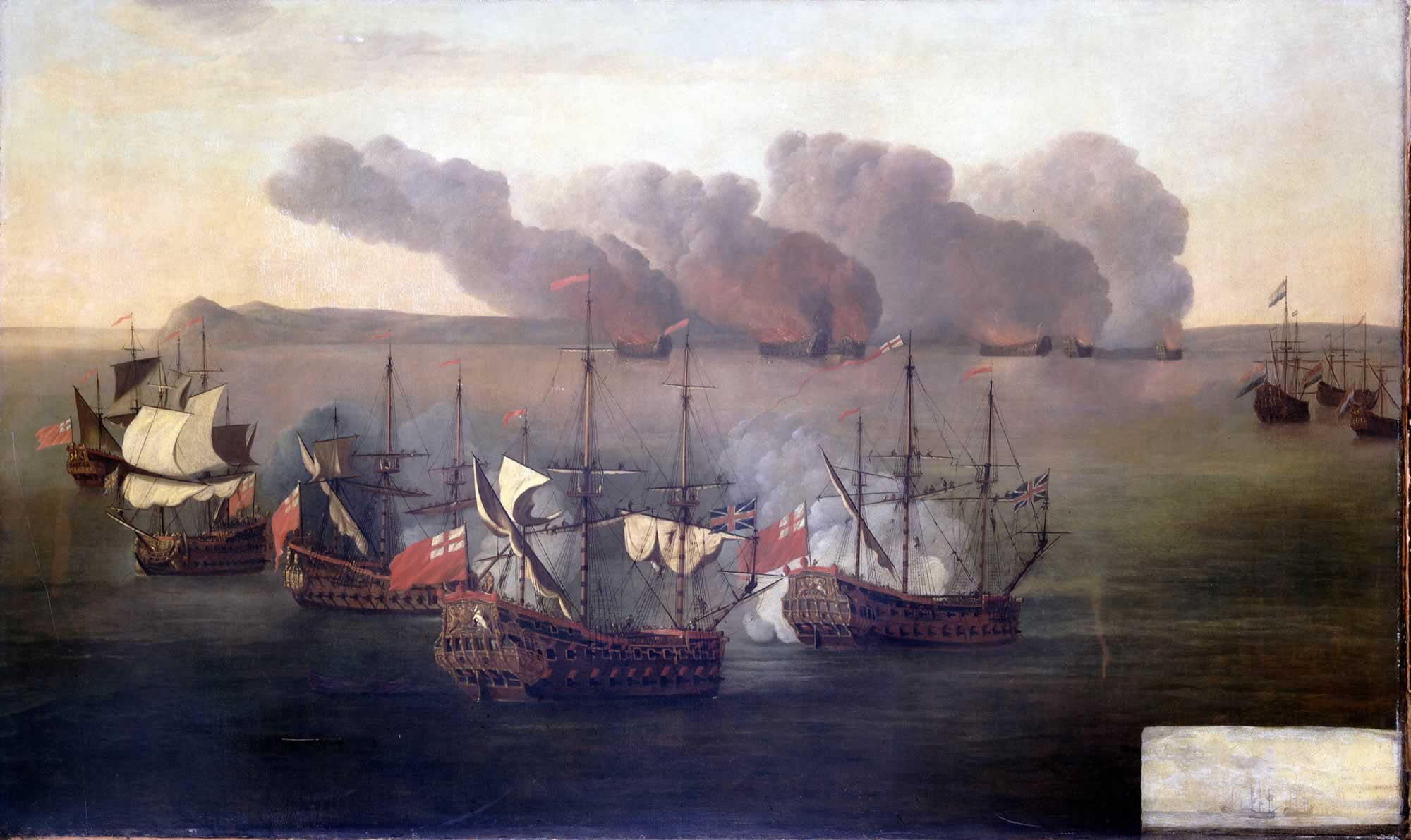
- Commodore Richard Beach and Dutch Admiral Van Ghent in a joint task force destroy six Barbary ships near Cape Spartel, Morocco, 17 August 1670, Jersey is the second left ship shown

History

Commonwealth of England
- Name: Foresight
- Ordered: 24 December 1649
- Builder: Jonas Shish, Deptford Dockyard
- Launched: 1650
- Commissioned: 1650
- Honours and awards: Kentish Knock 1652; Dungeness 1652; Portland 1653; Gabbard 1653; Scheveningen 1653; Porto Farina 1655; Santa Cruz 1657

Kingdom of England
- Name: Foresight
- Ordered: 24 December 1649
- Builder: Jonas Shish, Deptford Dockyard
- Launched: 1650
- Commissioned: 1650
- Honours and awards: Vagen 1665; Orfordness 1666; Schooneveld 1673; Texel 1673
- Fate: Wrecked, 4 July 1698

General characteristics
- Class & type: 40-gun Fourth rate
- Tons burthen: 513 24/94 tons bm
- Length: 121 ft 0 in (36.9 m) gundeck; 101 ft 6 in (30.9 m) keel for tonnage
- Beam: 30 ft 10 in (9.4 m)
- Draught: 14 ft 6 in (4.4 m)
- Depth of hold: 15 ft 5 in (4.7 m)
- Sail plan: ship-rigged
- Complement: 180 in 1653; 170 in 1666
- Armament: 42 guns 1653; 46 guns 1666; 22 × culverins (LD); 20 × demi-culverins (UD); 4 × sakers (QD) (2 sakers added in 1677); 52 guns in 1685; 22 × culverins (LD); 22 × demi-culverins (UD); 4 × sakers (QD); 4 × minions

The Foresight was one of six fourth-rate frigates ordered in December 1649 and built for the Commonwealth of England under the 1650 Programme; the others were the Assistance, Pelican, Reserve, Advice and Centurion. After the Restoration of the monarchy in 1660 she was incorporated into the Navy of the Kingdom of England. During her time in the Commonwealth Navy she partook in the First Anglo-Dutch War being present in the battles of Dungeness, Kentish Knock, Portland, The Gabbard and Scheveningen. She was also present at the Battle of Santa Cruz and the bombardment of Porto Farina, In the Second Anglo-Dutch War she was involved in the Battle of Vagen and the St James Day Fight. During the Third Anglo-Dutch War she participated in the battles of Schooneveld and Texel. For the remainder of her career she was in the West Indies, the Mediterranean and North American waters. She was wrecked south of Cuba in July 1698.

Foresight was the second named vessel since it was used for a 36-gun ship built in 1570 and sold in 1604.

== Construction and specifications ==
She was ordered on 24 December 1649 to be built at Deptford Dockyard under the guidance of Master Shipwright Jonas Shish. She was launched in 1650. Her dimensions were gundeck 121 feet 0 inches (36.9 metres) with 101 feet 6 inches (30.9 metres) keel for tonnage with a breadth of 30 feet 10 inches (9.4 metres) and a depth of hold of 15 feet 5 inches (4.7 metres). Her tonnage was 513 26/94 tons. She was remeasured at a later date and her dimensions changed to 102 feet 0 inches (31.1 metres) keel for tonnage with a breadth of 31 feet 1 inch (9.5 metres) and a depth of hold of 12 feet 9 inches (3.9 metres). Her tonnage was 522 tons. Her mean draught was 14 feet 6 inches (4.4 metres).

Her gun armament in 1653 was 42 guns. In 1666 her armament was 46 guns and consisted of twenty-two culverins (Note: The culverin was a gun of 4,500 pounds with a 5.5-inch bore firing a 17.5-pound shot with a twelve-pound powder charge) on the lower deck (LD), twenty demi-culverines (Note: The demi-culverin was a gun of 3,400 pounds with a four-inch bore firing a 9.5-pound shot with an eight-pound powder charge) on the upper deck, four sakers (Note: The sacar or saker was a gun of 1,400 pounds with a 3.5-inch bore firing a 4-pound shot with a 4-pound powder charge) on the quarterdeck (QD). In 1677 she had 2 more sakers added, bringing her gun total to 48 guns. In 1685 her guns were established at 52 guns. She now carried twenty-two culverins, twenty-two demi-culverins, four sakers and four minions. (Note: The minion or 4-pounder was a gun of 1,000 pounds with a 3.5-inch bore firing a 5.5-pound shot with a 5.5-pound powder charge) Her manning was 180 personnel in 1653 and 170 in 1666.

She was completed with a first cost of £3,393 (Note: The cost accounting for inflation of approximately £532,900 in reference to today.) or 522 tons @ £6.10.0d (Note: The cost accounting for inflation of approximately £1,000 in reference to today.) per ton.

== Commissioned service ==
=== Service in the Commonwealth Navy ===
She was commissioned in 1650 under Samuel Howett for service at the Downs and east coast. She was with Admiral William Penn's squadron in November 1650. She sailed to the Mediterranean with Admiral Penn's squadron in early 1652. The squadron returned to Home Waters in mid 1652. She partook in the Battle of Kentish Knock on 28 September 1652 and followed it by the Battle of Dungeness on 29 December 1652. In 1653 she was under the command of Captain Richard Stayner. She was at the Battle of Portland on 18 February 1653. She was a member of White Squadron, Center Division at the Battle of the Gabbard on 2/3 June 1653. This was followed by the Battle of Scheveningen off Texel on 31 July 1653. She spent the winter of 1653/54 in the English Channel. In early 1654 she came under the command of Peter Mootham and was with Robert Blake's Fleet in the Mediterranean. She was at the bombardment of Porto Farina, Tunis on 4 April 1665. She also partook in the Battle of Santa Cruz on 20 April 1657.

=== Service after the Restoration May 1660 ===
On 1 October 1661 Sir Thomas Allin was her commander for a voyage to Cadiz, Spain. On 9 August 1662 she was under command of Captain Packington Brooke until 25 September 1663. Captain Brooke was reappointed on 2 November 1664. She was at the Battle of Vagen near Bergen, Norway on 2 August 1665. She suffered 14 killed including Captain Brooke and 54 wounded. On 18 September 1665 Captain Hugh Seymour took command. He was killed at the St James Day Fight (she was a member of Red Squadron, Center Division) on 25 July 1666. On 27 July 1666 Captain John Finch took command. She captured the French ship Le Rubis on 18 September 1666. 6 November 1666 Captain Richard Goodlad took command until 31 January 1668. On 30 May 1668 Captain James Cartaret took command but he died on 6 July 1668. On 17 May 1669 she was under Captain John Hayward with Sir Thomas Allin's Squadron in the Mediterranean.

On 4 February 1672 Captain Richard James took command. She partook in the Battle of Schooneveld as a member of Blue Squadron, Center Division on 28 May 1673 followed by the Battle of Texel as a member of Blue Squadron on 11 August 1673. On 8 September 1674 She came under command of Captain William Davis for service at Jamaica in 1675. On 16 November 1677 she was under command of Captain Francis Willshaw in the Mediterranean in 1678. On 11 January 1680 her new commander was Captain Sir Robert Robinson followed by Captain Henry Killigrew on 28 January 1680 for service in the Mediterranean. She returned to Home Waters and paid off in February 1682. She recommissioned on 22 November 1682 under Captain David Trotter, who died on 15 July 1683. On 8 February 1684 She was under command of Captain George Aylmer for service in the Mediterranean. In March 1687 she was under command of Captain Lawrence Wright for service in Jamaica. July 1687 she was under Captain Sir John Narborough. Lieutenant Stanley was her commander with Dartmouth's Fleet in October 1688. Captain Daniel Jones took over in 1689 and was in action off the Isles of Scilly on 4 October 1689. Captain Basil Beaumont had command in 1690 then Captain Thomas Gillam in 1691. During the period of 1693/94 she was under command of Captain Isaac Townsend for service at Virginia. In 1694 she was under Captain J. Manston while refitting in July 1694. Captain Hovenden Walker took command in 1695 for defence of a convoy in the English Channel on 30 April 1695. In 1697 she was under Captain Charles Richards for service in Jamaica.

== Loss ==
Foresight was ordered home to be placed for sale. She was wrecked on the Jardine Rocks, south of Cuba, on 4 July 1698
