= 1650 Programme Group =

Class overview
- Name: 1650 Programme
- Builders: five by contract; Deptford Dockyard
- Operators: Kingdom of England; Royal Navy
- Preceded by: 1649 Programme Group
- Succeeded by: 1651 Programme Group
- Built: 1649 - 1650
- In service: 1650 - 1745
- Completed: 6
- Lost: 5
- Retired: 1

General characteristics
- Type: 34-gun Fourth Rate
- Tons burthen: 511 16/94 tons (bm)
- Length: 100 ft 0 in (30.48 m) keel for tonnage
- Beam: 31 ft 0 in (9.45 m)
- Sail plan: ship-rigged
- Complement: 150/1652, 160/1653
- Armament: 34 guns

The 1650 Programme of six 510-ton Fourth Rate vessels was initiated by the Council of State on 16 November 1649. On 2 January 1650 the Admiralty Committee confirmed that six 'frigates' had been ordered at a cost of 6.10.0d per ton. The ships would be built under contract with the exception of one ship built in Dockyard. The ships were all named by 16 August 1650 and launched by the end of the year. Each ship was to carry initially 34 guns and 150 men, although this would increase over time

== Design and specifications ==
The construction of one vessel was assigned to Deptford Dockyard with the remainder contracted to private builders. The contract dimensional data was a keel length of 100 ft 0 in (30.48 m) and a breadth of 31 ft 0 in (9.45 m), producing a builder's measurement tonnage of 511 16/94 tons at a contract price of 6.10.0d (Note: The cost accounting for inflation of approximately £1,000 in reference to today) per ton; the actual measurements as built are set out below. Soon after their first service, most were modified to have a forecastle added (to protect the upper deck, but not to carry guns) and were girdled (another layer of timbers added on each side), increasing their breadth (and consequently their BM tonnage) and enabling them to carry a heavier armament without jeopardising their stability. The ships were originally to have 34 guns and a manning level of 150, however, this was later increased to 40 guns with 180 men by December 1653, and for the surviving ships by 1666 to 46 guns with 170 men (in Foresight and Assistance) or to 48 guns with 180 men (in Reserve, Advice and Centurion). The guns were generally culverins (Note: The culverin was a gun of 4,500 pounds with a 5.5 inch bore firing a 17.5 pound shot with a twelve pound powder charge) on the lower deck (LD), demi-culverins (Note: The demi-culverin was a gun of 3,400 pounds with a four inch bore firing a 9.5 pound shot with an eight pound powder charge) on the upper deck and sakers (Note: The sacar or saker was a gun of 1,400 pounds with a 3.5 inch bore firing a 4 pound shot with an 4 pound powder charge) on the quarterdeck (QD).

== Ships of the 1650 Programme Group ==
Name	Builder	Launch year	Gundeck length	Keel length	Original breadth	Original burthen tonnage	Breadth after girdling	Tonnage after girdling	Careers and fates
Foresight (1650)	Jonas Shish, Deptford Dockyard	1650	121 ft 0in	101 ft 6 in	30 ft 10 in	51326/94	31 ft 1 in	52159/94	Wrecked 4 July 1698 about 50 miles south of Cuba
Assistance (1650)	Henry Johnson, Deptford	1650	121 ft 5.5 in	101 ft 6 in (102ft after girdling)	30 ft 10 in	51326/94	32 ft 4 in	56720/94	Rebuilt Deptford 1687; Rebuilt Deptford Dockyard 1699; Rebuilt Limehouse 1712; Rebuilt Woolwich Dockyard 1720–25; Sunk as breakwater December 1745
Reserve (1650)	Peter Pett II, Woodbridge, Suffolk	1650	118 ft 4in	100 ft 0 in	31 ft 1 in	51387/94	32 ft 10 in	57359/94	Rebuilt at Deptford 1700–01; Foundered 27 November 1703 off Gorleston, Norfolk in the Great storm of 1703
Advice (1650)	Peter Pett II, Woodbridge, Suffolk	1650	118 ft 6in	100 ft 0 in	31 ft 2 in	51664/94	32 ft 0 in	54464/94	Rebuilt at Woolwich 1700–01; Taken by six French privateers off Great Yarmouth on 27 June 1711
Pelican (1650)	John Taylor, Wapping, London	1650	n/a	100 ft 0 in	30 ft 8 in	50022/94	n/a	n/a	Accidentally burnt at Portsmouth on 13 February 1656
Centurion (1650)	Peter Pett I, Ratcliffe, London	1650	n/a	104 ft 0 in	31 ft 0 in	53158/94	n/a	n/a	Wrecked 25 December 1689 in Plymouth Sound
