= John Graydon =

Vice-Admiral John Graydon
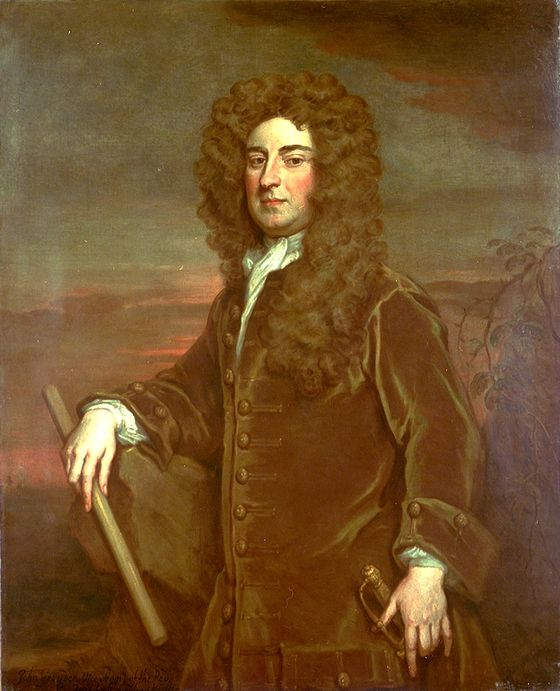
- Portrait of Graydon by Godfrey Kneller
- Born: c. 1666; Holborn, London, England
- Died: 12 March 1726; Fordwich, Kent
- Military career
- Allegiance: England; Great Britain
- Branch: Royal Navy
- Service years: –1726
- Rank: Vice-admiral
- Commands: HMS Soldado; HMS Defiance; HMS Hampton Court; HMS Vanguard; HMS Assistance; HMS Triumph; HMS Lancaster; Jamaica Station
- Conflicts: Nine Years' War; Battle of Bantry Bay; Battle of Beachy Head (1690); Action at Barfleur; War of the Spanish Succession; Battle of Cádiz (1702); Battle of Vigo Bay

Vice-Admiral John Graydon (c. 1666 – 12 March 1726) was a Royal Navy officer who served in the Nine Years' War and War of the Spanish Succession.

== Life ==
In June 1686 Graydon was appointed lieutenant of HMS Charles Galley; in May 1688 first lieutenant of HMS Mary, and in October was advanced to the command of the sixth-rate 16 gun HMS Soldado previously HMY Suadadoes. In her he took part in the battle of Bantry Bay on 1 May 1689, and was shortly afterwards promoted to HMS Defiance, which he commanded in the battle of Beachy Head, 30 June 1690. In 1692 he commanded HMS Hampton Court in the action at Barfleur. From 1694 to 1695 he was appointed Commander-in-Chief, Portsmouth and with the grand fleet through 1695.

From 1695 to 1697 he commanded HMS Vanguard, also with the grand fleet. In April 1701 in HMS Assistance he convoyed the trade to Newfoundland, and seeing the trade thence into the Mediterranean was back in England by the spring of 1702. In June, while in command of HMS Triumph at Portsmouth, he was promoted to be rear-admiral of the blue, and ordered out to join Sir George Rooke on the coast of Spain. He was with him in the attempt on Cadiz, and in the destruction of the enemy's ships at the Battle of Vigo Bay; and having his flag in HMS Lancaster returned home in company with Sir Cloudesley Shovell in charge of the prizes. The following January he was promoted to be vice-admiral of the white, and appointed commander-in-chief of a squadron sent out to the Jamaica Station.

He sailed with special orders to make the best of his way out, to collect such force, both of ships and troops, as might be available, and going north to reduce the French settlement of Placentia. A few days after he sailed, on 18 March, he fell in with a squadron of four French ships of force clearly inferior to the five with him. Graydon, however, considered that he was bound by his instructions to avoid all chances of delay; he allowed them to pass him unhindered, and did not pursue. He arrived at Barbados on 12 May, and at Jamaica on 4 June but the necessity of refitting, the condition of several of the ships, some of which had been long on the station, the want of stores, and the bad feeling with the locals, all combined to delay the expedition. It did not reach Newfoundland till the beginning of August. From that time for thirty days it was enveloped in a dense fog; it was 3 September before the fleet was again assembled, and then a council of war, considering the lateness of the season, the bad condition of the ships, the sickly state of the men, the want of provisions, and the strength of the enemy at Placentia, decided that the attack ought not to be made. On 24 September the fleet accordingly sailed for England; the weather was very bad, the ships were scattered, and singly reached home in the course of October.

The expedition had been an evident failure, and the neglect to engage the French squadron passed on the outward voyage appeared culpable; and a committee of the House of Lords reported that Graydon by his conduct had been a prejudice to the queen's service and a great dishonour to the nation, and recommended that he should 'be employed no more in her majesty's service'. He was not tried, but was condemned on hearsay. Graydon was virtually cashiered, his pension was stopped, and he was not reinstated. He died on 12 March 1726.

His portrait, a half-length by Sir Godfrey Kneller, is in the Painted Hall at Greenwich, to which it was presented by George IV.

== Sources ==
- Cundall, Frank (1915). Historic Jamaica. West India Committee.

This article incorporates text from a publication now in the public domain: "Graydon, John". Dictionary of National Biography. London: Smith, Elder & Co. 1885–1900.
