= Richard Carter (Royal Navy officer) =

English naval officer (died 1692)

Rear-Admiral Richard Carter
- Died: 19 May 1692 (O.S.)
- Burial place: Portsmouth, Hampshire
- Military career
- Allegiance: Kingdom of England
- Service: Royal Navy
- Service years: 1672–1692
- Rank: Rear-Admiral of the Blue
- Conflicts: Williamite War in Ireland; Battle of Bantry Bay; Nine Years' War; Battle of Beachy Head; Battle of Barfleur †

Richard Carter (died 1692) was an English officer in the Royal Navy. He is said to have been lieutenant of the Cambridge in 1672, with Captain Herbert, and to have been promoted from her by Prince Rupert to command the Success, from which, early in 1673, he was moved to the Crown. In April 1675 he was appointed to the Swan, and in January 1678 was moved into the Centurion, which was employed in the Mediterranean against the Barbary corsairs.

In August 1688 he was appointed to the Plymouth, continued in her during and after the Glorious Revolution, and commanded her in the Battle of Beachy Head. During the summer of 1691 he commanded the Vanguard, and early in the following year was promoted to be rear-admiral of the Blue squadron.

In April 1692 he was sent with a few ships to scour the coast of France and survey La Hague, and returned to the fleet in time to take part in the Battle of Barfleur. At the start of the action a light wind kept Carter's Blue squadron away from the rest of the fleet; but later a shift of wind brought his ships among the French, and he was killed in the fighting.

Carter was buried at Portsmouth with ceremonial honour. He had been lieutenant-governor of Southsea Castle since 1682. Allegations of Jacobite leanings were made against him, but never proved.

== Career ==
Richard Carter was a servant of Sir Frescheville Holles and was commissioned first lieutenant of the Cambridge, commanded by Holles, on 8 January 1672. After Holles's death at the Battle of Solebay, Carter continued lieutenant of the Cambridge, under Captain Herbert, afterwards Earl of Torrington, and was promoted from her by Prince Rupert to command the Success on 6 February 1673. From 5 June 1673 he commanded the Crown of 42 guns but was discharged on 10 October 1674.

In June 1674 he was detached, together with the Nightingale, commanded by Captain Harris, to cruise off the coast of Zealand. On their return to the fleet they fell in with three large Dutch frigates at about 3 a.m. on 8 June. The Dutch ships, the largest of which mounted 44 guns, the two others 30 guns each, had the advantage of the weather gage. About five o'clock the action commenced, and continued with great spirit on both sides for three hours, when the Dutch finding the contest evidently to their disadvantage, thought proper to haul their wind and make for their own coast, which they were fortunate enough to reach notwithstanding the English ships pursued them for seven hours with all the sail they could make. (Note: "Whitehall, June 10.—We have advice that two of his majesty's frigates, the Crown and the Nightingale, having been sent our by his highness, prince Rupert, to cruise in their return from the coast of Zealand, met, the 8th instant, to the eastward of the Galloper, about three in the morning, with three Dutch men of war, which were to windward of them, the biggest of forty-four guns, and the other two of thirty guns a-piece. About five in the morning our frigatees engaged them, and fought them as briskly as a leeward wind would give them leave: they fought three hours; but the Dutch finding our ships too hot for them, and having received some damage, made all the sail they could towards our own coast, ours chacing them seven hours, but finding they could not come up with them gave over the case and are come in.")

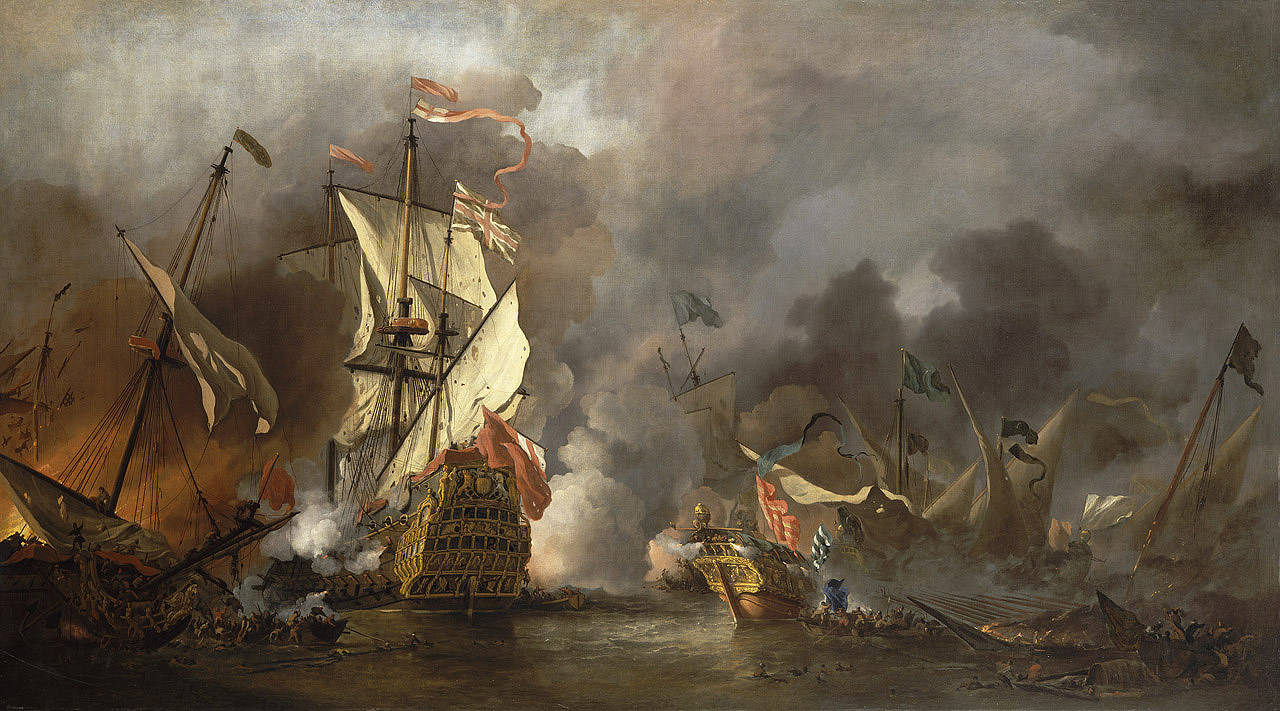
An English Ship in Action with Barbary Vessels, 1678

In April 1675 (Note: 12 April 1675.) Carter was appointed captain of the Swan; from which ship he was, on 11 January 1678, (Note: 7 January 1678.) removed into the Centurion. He was sent to the Straits in March 1678, under the orders of Sir John Ernley, in the Defiance, as convoy to a fleet of merchant ships. In November 1679 he served on shore, under his old commander, Captain Herbert, in the defence of English Tangier, then severely pressed by the Moors. In this service he was lightly wounded. Centurion was employed in the Mediterranean, more especially against the Barbary corsairs, till she was paid off on 24 October 1681. Carter was appointed lieutenant-governor of Southsea Castle on 26 February 1682.

In August 1688 (Note: 3 August 1688.) he was appointed to the Plymouth, a third-rate, and continued in her during and after the Glorious Revolution. He commanded her in the Battle of Bantry Bay on 11 May 1689 and in her led the van of the Red squadron in the Battle of Beachy Head on 30 June 1690. At Beachy Head he was one of the few English commanders of the Red squadron who were enabled, from the form in which the French fleet was drawn up, to get near enough to receive considerable damage; by that means he escaped the censure even of the Dutch. (Note: "As for what concerns the English, most certainly, unless it were some few vessels that fought against Torrington's order, the rest did nothing at all."—Evertz. Letter to the States General.)

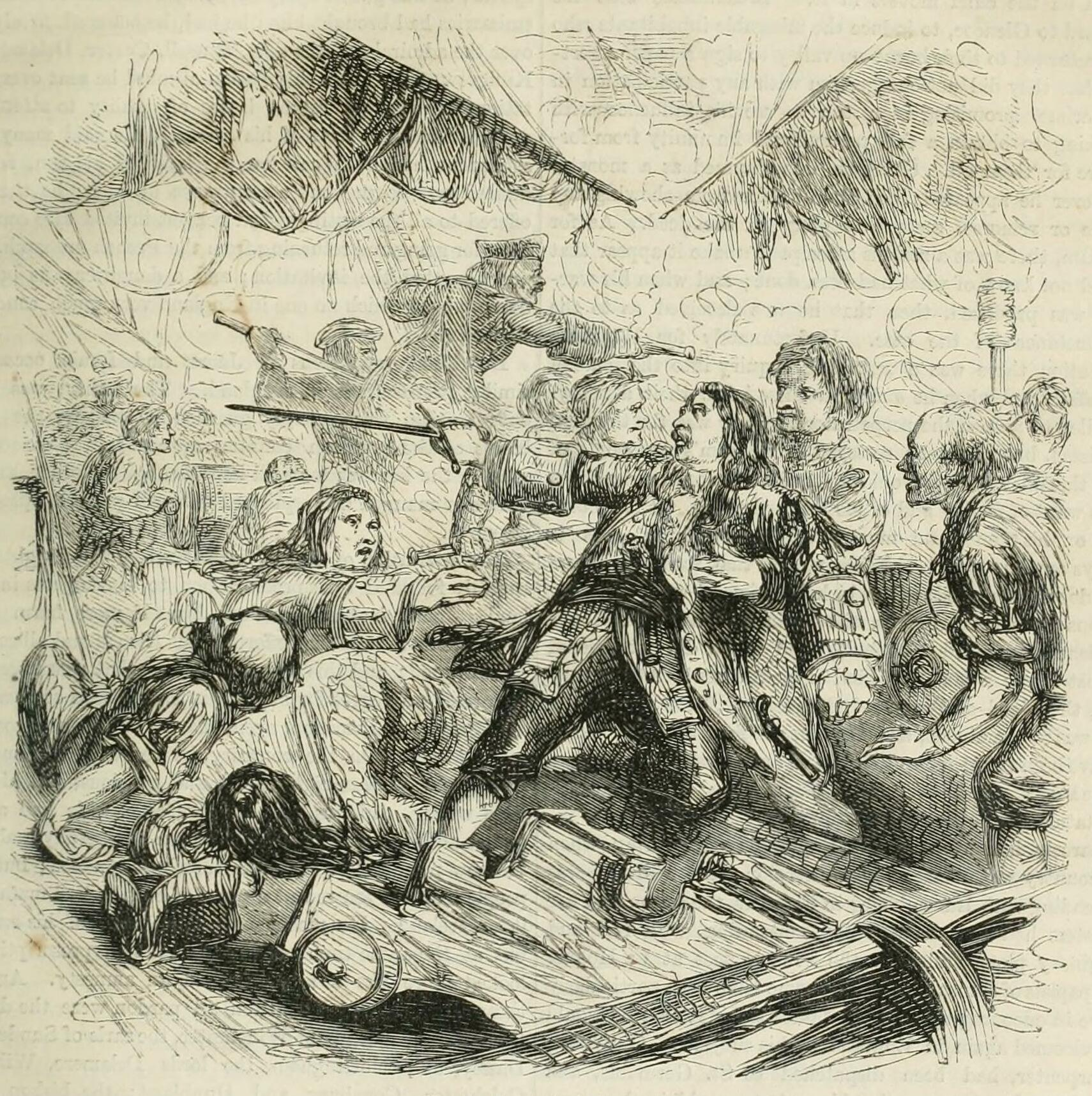
Death of Admiral Carter, 1860

From 21 January 1691 he commanded the Vanguard, a ship of the second-rate, and on 29 January 1692 was promoted to be rear-admiral of the Blue squadron. In April 1692 (Note: 14 April 1692.) he was sent to cruise off the coast of France in command of a squadron. The object of the expedition was to destroy any single ships or small squadron he might discover, under Cape la Hogue, or off Havre, and to survey La Hague on the French coast. Information having been received that the French were preparing to put to sea in great force, orders for his return to the fleet, were dispatched after him. (Note: 20 and 23 April.) He met Sir Ralph Delaval, (Note: 9 May.) who had been detached, with a small squadron, in search of him; and they both joined Admiral Russel and the fleet before the Battles of Barfleur and La Hougue. (Note: 13 May.)

Carter took part in the Battle of Barfleur on 19 May. At the beginning of the action a light wind kept the Blue squadron some distance to leeward, and hopelessly out of the fight; but towards the afternoon a shift of wind permitted it to lay up to the enemy, and eventually to get to windward of them, thus placing them between two fires. By about 6 p.m. Carter in the Duke and the rest of his ships were engaged with the enemy as the tide carried them among the French. There was for a short time some sharp fighting, in which Carter lost a leg. He was struck by a splinter of one of his own yardarms, and fell dying on the deck. He would not be carried below. He would not let go his sword. "Fight the ship", were his last words: "fight the ship as long as she can swim". He died of his wounds at 10 p.m.

The body of the admiral was brought on shore with every mark of honour; the ships of his division fired twenty-two gun salutes as his remains were rowed ashore. He was buried at Portsmouth on 3 June 1692, with a great display of military pomp and ceremony. His widow, Mary, was granted a pension of 200l. per annum.

== Appraisal ==
It was openly stated by many, both before and after his death, that Carter was in the interest of King James, that his taking service under William was a pretence, and that he had received 10,000l. to take his division over to the French in April 1692. Laughton, writing in 1887, opposes this view: "In life Carter was a poor man, and he died poor; so far from attempting to hand his division over to the enemy, he fell while executing the manoeuvre which insured their ruin, and as he died his last words were an exhortation to his men to fight bravely, fight to the last. The story may be pronounced a libel on a brave man."

== Sources ==
- Ames, Richard (1692). An elegy on the death of that brave sea-commander, Reer-Admiral Carter, who was unfortunately kill'd in the famous ingagement with the French fleet, on the 20th of May, 1692. London: printed for Richard Baldwin, MDXCCII [i.e. 1692].
- Charnock, John (1794). "Harris, Joseph". "Carter, Richard". Biographia Navalis. Vol. 1. London: Printed for R. Faulder. pp. 233–234, 389–392.
- Howitt, William (1860). John Cassell's Illustrated History of England. Vol. 4. London: Cassell, Peter, and Galpin. pp. 61–64.
- Macaulay, Thomas Babington (1887). The History of England from the Accession of James II. Vol. 4. Philadelphia: Porter & Coates. pp. 304, 315, 317, 321–322.
- Laughton, J. K.; Le Fevre, Peter (2008). "Carter, Richard (d. 1692), naval officer". Oxford Dictionary of National Biography (online ed.). Oxford University Press. doi:10.1093/ref:odnb/4798. (Subscription, Wikipedia Library access or UK public library membership required.)
- The London Gazette. No. 2767. 16–19 May 1692. p. 1.
- The London Gazette. No. 2773. 6–9 June 1692. p. 2.

Attribution:

- This article incorporates text from a publication now in the public domain: Laughton, John Knox (1887). "Carter, Richard". In Stephen, Leslie (ed.). Dictionary of National Biography. Vol. 9. London: Smith, Elder & Co. pp. 205–206.
