= Battle of Bantry Bay =

1689 battle of the Nine Years' War

- Part of the Nine Years' War and Williamite War in Ireland
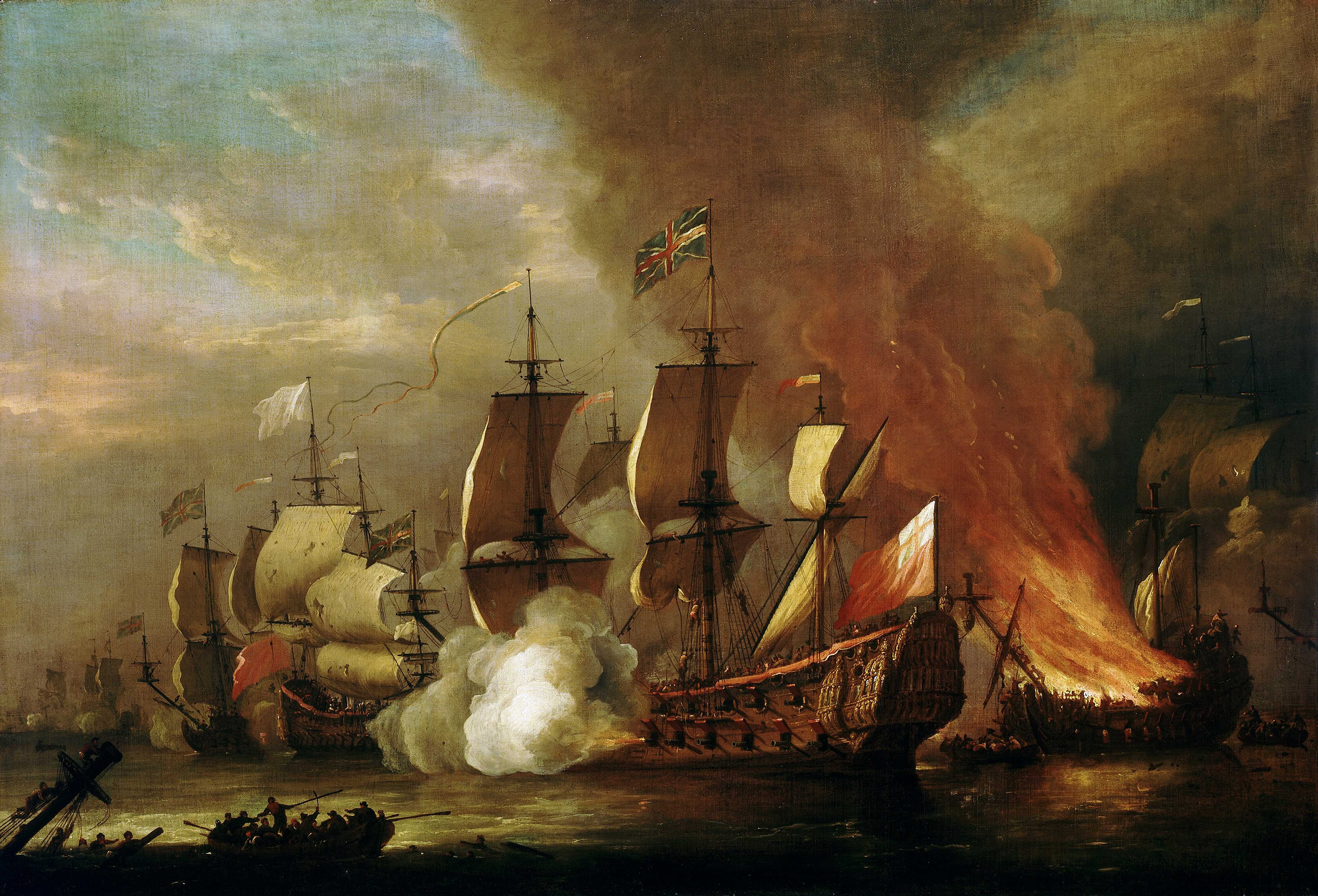
- Possible painting of the battle by Adriaen van Diest
Date	11 May 1689
Location	Bantry Bay 51°39′N 9°43′W
Result	French victory

Belligerents
France	England

Commanders and leaders
François Châteaurenault	Arthur Herbert

Strength
19–22 warships	24 warships

Casualties and losses
40 killed 93 wounded	94 killed c. 300 wounded

The Battle of Bantry Bay was on 11 May 1689, a week before the declaration of the Nine Years' War between the English and French navies. The English were commanded by Admiral Arthur Herbert, while the French were under the command of François Louis Rousselet de Châteaurenault. Apart from the inshore operations during the siege of La Rochelle, the battle was the first time English and French navies had fought a fleet action since 1545.

The battle, fought near the southern Irish coast, ended somewhat inconclusively. The French, endeavouring to supply King James II in his attempt to re-establish his throne, had managed to unload their supplies for James's campaign in Ireland. Although the French failed to follow up their tactical success with strategic gain, Châteaurenault's fleet inflicted considerable damage on Herbert's ships.

== Background ==
Following the Glorious Revolution of 1688, James II of England lost his throne to William, Prince of Orange. The new William III reigned jointly with his wife Mary. James fled to France and was given succour by his co-religionist, Louis XIV, but was determined to regain his throne. In this endeavour Louis was willing to support James, primarily for two reasons: firstly, he fervently believed in the Stuart king’s God-ordained right to the English throne; secondly, and primarily, the war in Ireland would divert William's energy and forces away from the Spanish Netherlands, a theatre which would later become the main focus for both William's and Louis's efforts during the conflict.

While in France, James built up an army to support his Lord Deputy in Ireland, the Earl of Tyrconnell. James had already sent financial help, but it was not until March 1689 that he was ready to sail in person to lead the campaign. After landing in Kinsale with 100 French officers and about 2,500 mixed troops, James, together with Tyrconnell – whom he now made a duke – travelled to Dublin. James hoped to quickly establish control over Ireland before pressing on to Scotland or England, but this was impossible while Protestant strongholds in northern Ireland remained outside his control. The campaign, therefore, urgently required supplies and equipment from France, but English Parliamentarians, acutely worried of the situation developing in Ireland, were determined to use the Royal Navy and frustrate James’s designs.

== Battle ==
Battle of Bantry Bay, 11 May 1689.

The newly appointed commander-in-chief of the English main fleet, Arthur Herbert, did not go to sea until the beginning of April, leaving behind a number of ships which had mutinied for overdue pay. Herbert's fleet of 19 ships sailed on 4 April; it was off Cork by 12 April, seeking to intercept enemy vessels. The French fleet, consisting of 24 third- and fourth-rate vessels, two frigates, a number of fireships, and transports carrying weapons and supplies for James’s campaign, left the port of Brest on 6 May.

As the French approached southern Ireland Herbert's squadron had made offloading supplies at Kinsale impossible, thus forcing François Louis Rousselet de Châteaurenault to anchor his fleet in Bantry Bay, joining up with a further three French frigates there. The following morning on 11 May, as the French were landing 1,500 men with money, arms and ammunition, Admiral Herbert’s fleet came into view. The French weighed anchor, and a running battle ensued in the confined waters of the bay. Initially the two fleets opposed each other in parallel lines but Châteaurenault, enjoying the weather gage, drove Herbert from the bay into the open sea. The ensuing battle – which in total lasted four hours – was somewhat inconclusive, but the French had protected the transports which managed to unload. When the French broke off the action late in the afternoon in order to return to the anchorage, Herbert's ships were too damaged to follow, and he had suffered many casualties.

== Ships involved ==
The French squadron comprised:

- François 48, Capt. Pannetier
- Vermandois 60, Capt. Charles-François de Machault de Belmont
- Duc 50, Capt. Colbert-Saint-Mars
- Fendant 52, Capt. de Réals
- Saint Michel 56, Chef d'escadre Jean Gabaret
- Fort 56, Capt. le chevalier de Rosmadec
- Léger 40, Capt. le chevalier de Forbis
- Précieux 52, Capt de Salanpart
- Capable 48, Capt. de Bellefontaine
- Arrogant 58, Capt de la Harteloire
- Diamant 54, Capt. le chevalier de Coëtlogon
- Ardent 66, Capt. Desnos Champmeslin (flagship of Lieutenant-general François Louis Rousselet de Châteaurenault)
- Furieux 60, Capt. Desnos
- Faucon 40, Capt le chevalier d'Hervault
- Modéré 50, Capt. le marquis de Saint-Hermine
- Entreprenant 56, Capt. de Beaujeu
- Courageux 56, Chef d'escadre Job Forant
- Neptune 46, Capt. de Pallière
- Arc en Ciel 44, Capt. de Perrinet
- Excellent 60, Capt. de Lavigerie
- Sage 52, Capt. de Vaudricourt
- Oiseau 40, Capt. Duquesne Guition
- Emporté 42, Capt. Roussel
- Apollon 56, Capt. Montortier

There were also 5 frigates and 10 fireships.

The English squadron comprised:

- Defiance 64, Capt. John Ashby
- Portsmouth 46, Capt. George St Loe
- Plymouth 60, Capt. Richard Carter
- Ruby 48, Capt. Frederick Froud
- Diamond 48, Capt. Benjamin Walters
- Advice 48, Capt. John Granville
- Mary 62, Capt. Matthew Aylmer
- Saint Albans 50, Capt. John Layton
- Edgar 64, Capt. Cloudesley Shovell
- Elizabeth 70, Capt. David Mitchell (flagship of Admiral Arthur Herbert)
- Pendennis 70, Capt. George Churchill
- Portland 50, Capt. George Aylmer
- Deptford 54, Capt. George Rooke
- Woolwich 54, Capt. Ralph Sanderson
- Dartmouth 36, Capt. Thomas Ley
- Greenwich 54. Capt. Christopher Billopp
- Cambridge 70, Capt. John Clements
- Antelope 48, Capt. Henry Wickham
- York 60, Capt. Ralph Delavall
- There were also 2 bomb vessels (Firedrake and Salamander)
- and a fireship (previously HMY Saudadoes -re-commissioned as HMS Soldado) commanded by John Graydon (c.1666–1726).

== Aftermath ==
The fleets withdrew: Châteaurenault returned to Brest on 18 May, seizing on the way seven Dutch merchant vessels bound from the West Indies. Herbert sailed for the Scilly Isles, before reaching Spithead, via Plymouth, on 22 May. For both the French and English however, the battle was equally unsatisfactory. Although the damage sustained to Herbert’s ships was enough to lay his squadron up for two months in Portsmouth (during which time the Irish waters were completely uncovered), Châteaurenault failed to press his advantage – much to the dismay of his junior flag-officers, Job Forant and Jean Gabaret. King William was also unsatisfied with the outcome; nevertheless, he created Herbert Earl of Torrington, mainly in recognition of his work the previous year during the 'Glorious Revolution'. Moreover, the King knighted two of Herbert’s captains, John Ashby who had led the van, and Cloudesley Shovell, and ordered a gratuity of ten shillings a head for the seamen. James, meanwhile, had begun the Siege of Derry, the capture of which would open communications with Jacobite forces in Scotland; three French frigates under Captain Duquesne were assigned to support him. In response, the Scottish parliament commissioned two small cruisers, the Pelican and the Janet to oppose the French squadron, but, on 20 July, they were both taken by Duquesne in the North Channel.

The Allies now began to build up their naval strength in the Channel; the fleet would soon comprise 34 English and 20 Dutch ships of the line, with four frigates and 17 fireships. After rendezvousing with victuallers, the Anglo-Dutch squadrons patrolled south of Kinsale to prevent further French supplies reaching Ireland. However, when the French Brest fleet – now joined by Tourville’s squadron of 20 rated vessels and four frigates – set sail on 15 August, it cruised in the Bay of Biscay, posing no threat to England or English communications with Ireland. The French, therefore, were unable to prevent Admiral Rooke relieving the siege of Derry on 10 August, or, forestall Marshal Schomberg's army from England landing near Carrickfergus on 23 August. With Schomberg's reinforcements, the Williamite army opposing James in Ireland now amounted to some 40,000 troops.
