= Prins Willem =

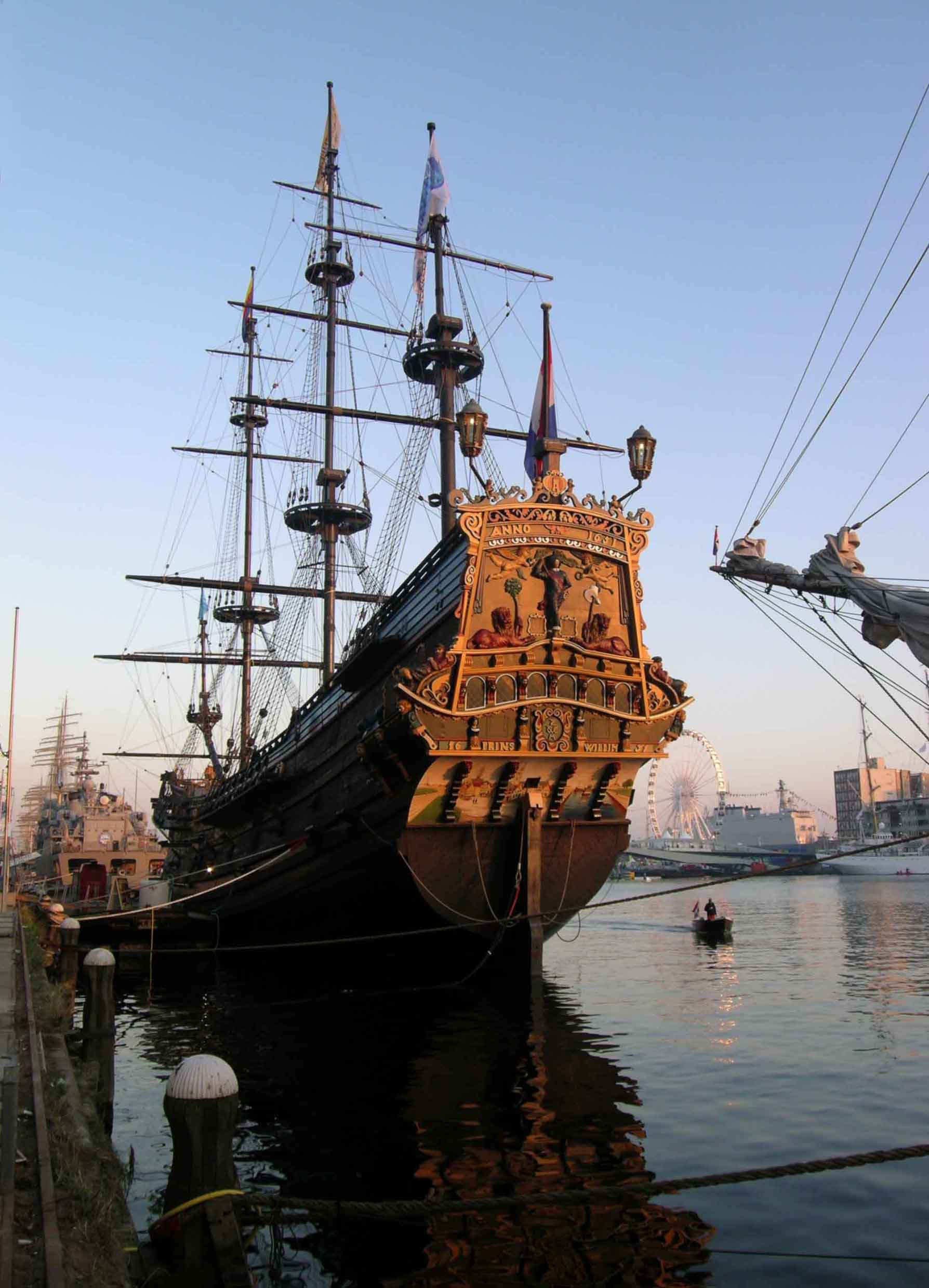
- The 1985 replica of the Prins Willem in 2005

History

Dutch Republic
- Name: Prins Willem
- Owner: Dutch East India Company
- Launched: 1650
- Fate: Sank, 1662

General characteristics
- Tons burthen: 1200 tons
- Length: 51 m (167 ft) (68 m (223 ft) overall)
- Beam: 14.3 m (47 ft)
- Draught: almost 4 m (13 ft)
- Sail plan: Full-rigged ship
- Armament: 24 guns, later 40 guns

The Prins Willem (Dutch pronunciation: [prɪns ˈʋɪləm]), also spelled Prins Willim, was a 17th-century East Indiaman of the Dutch East India Company. She was their largest ship at the time. The ship made her first voyage to the Dutch East Indies in 1651. After several voyages, she sank near Madagascar in 1662. A replica of the Prins Willem was built in 1985, but she was destroyed by fire in 2009.

== History ==
The ship Prins Willim was built in 1650 in Middelburg in the Dutch Republic. Curiously, the name on the ship was Prins Willim. Two possible reasons have been advanced: the ship's name is Middle Dutch or the lack of space for the name caused the "e" to be changed to a shorter "i".

The ship was the flagship of Witte de With in the Battle of the Kentish Knock during the First Anglo-Dutch War.

The ship sank near Madagascar in 1662.

== Replicas ==
In the same period as the building of the original ship also a replica in 1:50 scale was built. This model still survives and is on permanent exhibition in the Dutch national museum Rijksmuseum Amsterdam. In 1978 this model was fully restorated and a replica of the same scale was constructed.

A full size replica with the same name was built in 1984–85 at the Dutch shipyard Amels in Makkum for the Nagasaki Holland Village (長崎オランダ村, Nagasaki Oranda Mura) theme park in Seihi, Nagasaki Prefecture, Japan. The building cost was 1.4 billion yen.

In 2003, Huis Ten Bosch K. K., the operating company of Nagasaki Holland Village declared bankruptcy and the replica was sold to a Dutch company for 130 million yen.

In 2004, the replica became part of the theme park Cape Holland in Den Helder, the Netherlands.

In 2009, the bowsprit of the Prins Willim replica was being restored.

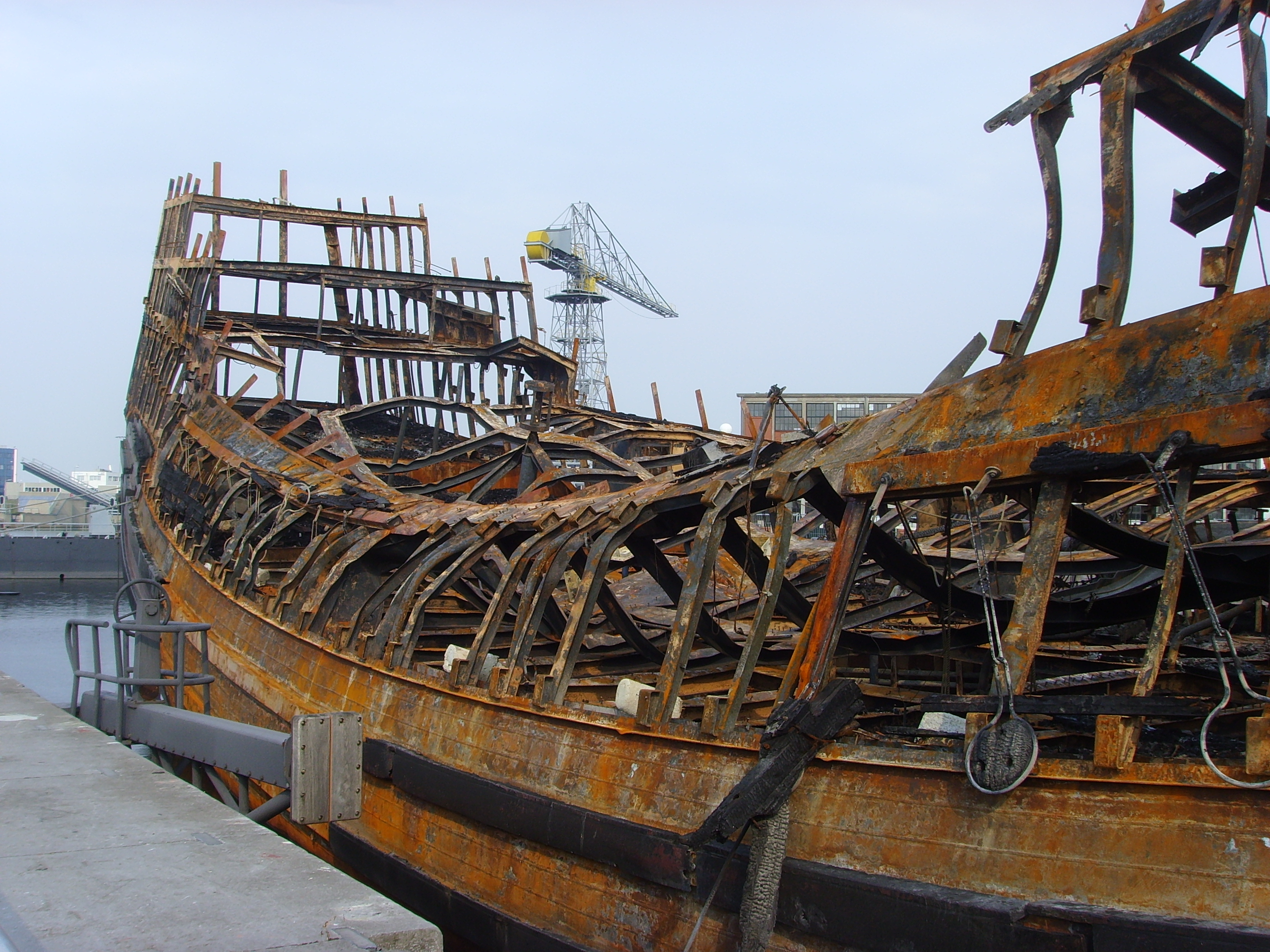
The replica ship after the fire in 2009

On the morning of 30 July 2009, the replica was lost to fire, probably due to an electric malfunction. The owner of the ship, the Libéma company, decided on a restoration. In 2014 the ship was dismantled, as the restoration turned out to be too expensive.
