= Battle of the Kentish Knock =

1652 naval battle of the First Anglo-Dutch War

- Part of First Anglo-Dutch War
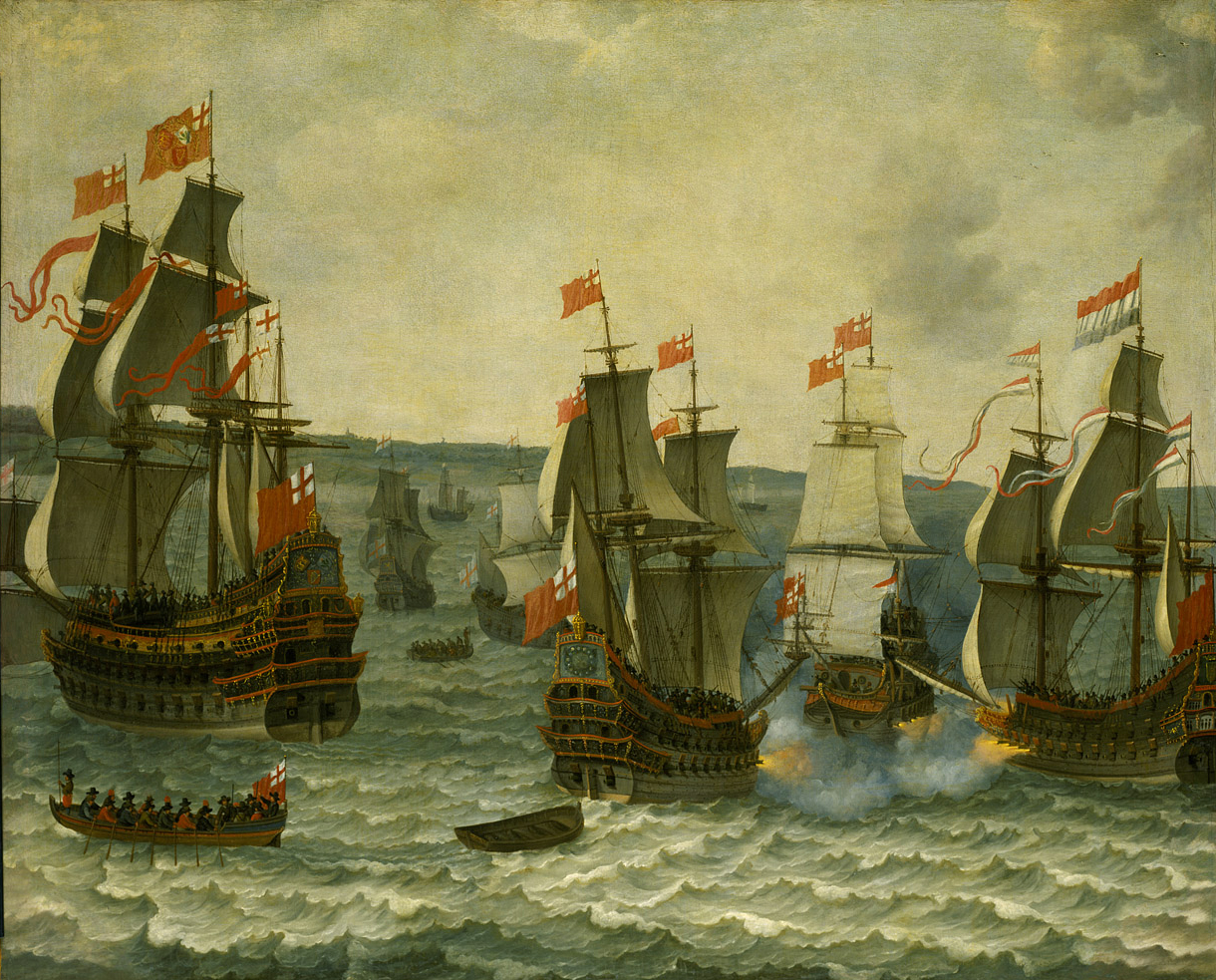
- Action between ships in the First Dutch War, 1652–1654 by Abraham Willaerts, may depict the Battle of the Kentish Knock. It is a pastiche of popular subjects of naval painting of the time: on the right Brederode duels Resolution; on the left the enormous Sovereign
Date	28 September 1652
Location	Off Kentish Knock 51.5°N 1.2°E
Result	English victory

Belligerents
Dutch Republic	Commonwealth of England

Commanders and leaders
(Dutch Republic) Witte Corneliszoon de With	(Commonwealth of England) Robert Blake (Commonwealth of England) Benjamin Blake (Commonwealth of England) Prince Rupert

Strength
62 ships 1,900 guns 7,000 sailors	68 ships 2,400 guns 10,000 sailors

Casualties and losses
2 ships	light

The Battle of the Kentish Knock (or the Battle of the Zealand Approaches) was a naval battle between the fleets of the Dutch Republic and England, fought on 28 September 1652 (8 October Gregorian calendar), (Note: During this period in English history dates of events are usually recorded in the Julian calendar, while those the Netherlands are recorded in the Gregorian calendar. In this article dates are in the Julian calendar with the start of the year adjusted to 1 January (see Old Style and New Style dates).) during the First Anglo-Dutch War near the shoal called the Kentish Knock in the North Sea about thirty kilometres east of the mouth of the river Thames. The Dutch fleet, internally divided on political, regional and personal grounds, proved incapable of making a determined effort and was soon forced to withdraw, losing two ships and many casualties. In Dutch the action is called the Slag bij de Hoofden.

== Backgrounds ==
Dutch Lieutenant-Admiral Maarten Tromp had been suspended by the States-General of the Netherlands after his failure to bring the English to battle off the Shetland Islands in August, and replaced as supreme commander of the confederate Dutch fleet by the Hollandic Vice-Admiral Witte de With of the Admiralty of the Maze. This caused an immediate rift between the provinces of Holland and Zealand as De With was the personal enemy of the commander of the Zealandic fleet, Vice-Admiral Johan Evertsen, who himself had quit service because of a conflict with the States-General. Earlier tensions had been moderated by the fact that both Tromp and Evertsen were staunch Orangists, but De With was a loyal servant of the States regime that had dominated Dutch politics since the death of stadtholder William II of Orange.

De With, having for months advocated a more aggressive naval policy aimed at destroying the enemy fleet instead of passively defending the merchant convoys against English attack, now saw an opportunity to concentrate his forces and gain control of the seas. He set out to attack the English fleet at anchor at The Downs near Dover, departing from the Schooneveld on 25 September 1652, and joined the squadron of Vice-Commodore Michiel de Ruyter. The fleet was immediately hit by a storm damaging many vessels. De With also had to protect the trade routes and discovered that nine of De Ruyter's ships, that had been on sea for two months, had to return to port for repairs. De Ruyter suggested that under the circumstances it was better to simply keep luring away the English from merchant fleets while declining to really fight, but De With insisted on delivering a decisive battle, stating: "I shall lustily lead the fleet to the enemy; the devil may bring it back again!".

== Battle ==
When the fleets finally met on 28 September, the United Provinces had 62 ships and about 1,900 cannon and 7,000 men; the Commonwealth of England 68 ships under General at Sea Robert Blake with about 2,400 cannon and 10,000 men. The van of the Dutch fleet was to be commanded by Michiel de Ruyter, the centre by De With himself and the rear by temporary Rear-Admiral Gideon de Wildt of the Admiralty of Amsterdam.

On the morning of 28 September the Dutch fleet, approaching from the east, had the previous evening been again scattered by a gale and was still dispersed when around noon it saw Blake coming out in force from the south. Having the weather gauge because of a south-south-western breeze, Blake intended to exploit this excellent opportunity for a direct attack on the disordered Dutch.

Having hurriedly assembled his force around 14:30, with the exception of five vessels that had drifted too far to the north, De With now wanted to transfer his flag from the smaller Prinses Louise to the Brederode, Tromp's former flagship and the most powerful vessel of the Dutch fleet. However, to his mortification, Tromp's crew refused to let him on board, addressing De With the invective 'green cheese' and even threatening to fire a salvo on his boat if he did not stop waving around his commission papers from the States-General: he had a very bad reputation among common sailors – indeed hundreds had already deserted when it became known he would be supreme commander. Zealandic Commodore Cornelis Evertsen the Elder, the brother of Johan Evertsen, was called in to negotiate but to no avail. When the enemy fleet was within half a mile distance, De With was forced to hoist his flag on the large but slow VOC-ship Prins Willem where he found the majority of its officers drunk and the crew to be consisting of untrained men.

Action was joined at about 17:00 when Blake, himself moving his flag from the too large Sovereign to the more manoeuvrable Resolution (the former HMS Prince Royal), engaged the Dutch. Blake intended to break the Dutch line, but on the approach of the English fleet the mass of Dutch ships began to give way to the east. At the same time the wind slackened considerably. As a result, both fleets slowly passed each other in opposite tack. This was very unfavourable for the Dutch; normally being in a leeward position would have given them a longer range, but with such gentle winds this advantage was absent while the English ships were larger and better armed than their opponents, inflicting severe damage. Nevertheless, some English ships at first got into trouble: the Sovereign and James ran aground on the Kentish Knock sandbank and only with much difficulty worked themselves free; the Resolution and the Dolphin, venturing too far forward, became isolated and surrounded but were saved by the encroachment of the other English vessels. The Prins Willem was disabled, meaning that De With was greatly hampered in his efforts to lead his forces. But soon, by 19:00, the fighting stopped due to the onset of darkness, the fleets just having finished this single manoeuvre. At this moment one Dutch ship, the Maria, had been captured while another captured ship, the Gorcum, was abandoned by the English in a sinking condition but re-occupied and saved by the Dutch. The Burgh van Alkmaar blew up. Several Dutch ships, their morale shaken by the devastating English fire, left their formation.

The next day, early in the morning, about ten Dutch ships, mostly commanded by captains from Zealand who resented the domination of Holland and severely disliked De With, had broken off the engagement and simply sailed home. This is usually attributed to the fact that De With in the battle council in the morning of the second day had called all Zealandic captains cowards and had warned them that in Holland there was still sufficient wood left to erect gallows for any of them. The situation had become hopeless for the Dutch who now had 49 ships left in their fleet while the English fleet had during the night been reinforced to 84, yet De With still wanted to make a last effort.

On his directions the Dutch fleet, now positioned to the southeast of the English force, sailed farther south in the hope of gaining the weather gauge. This design failed however: first some ships, with difficulty beating up the wind, coursed too far to the west and were badly mauled by the fire of the English rear; and hardly had the Dutch fleet moved to its intended position when it all proved to have been in vain because the wind turned to the northeast, giving the English the weather gauge again. Michiel de Ruyter and Cornelis Evertsen now managed to convince De With to accept the inevitable and the Dutch fleet late in the afternoon withdrew to the east followed by Blake; as De With angrily described it: "like a herd of sheep fleeing the wolves". Assisted by a westerly De With and De Ruyter nicely covered the retreat with a dozen ships and the Dutch would not lose any more vessels.

The English fleet halted its pursuit when the Flemish shoals were reached; De With now decided to quickly repair the fleet at sea in the Wielingen basin and then make another attempt at defeating the enemy. This order was met with utter disbelief by his fellow flag officers. De Ruyter tactfully pointed out: "Such courage is too perilous". Understanding he was alone in his opinion De With at last agreed to withdraw the fleet to Hellevoetsluis, where it arrived on 2 October (12 October).

== Aftermath ==
The Dutch recognized after their defeat that they needed larger ships to take on the English, and instituted a major building program of sixty ships that would only be completed some years after the conflict, first seeing major action in the Battle of the Sound. According to De With this, besides a lack of a sufficient number of fireships, had been the main cause of the Dutch failure; he pointed out that many a light English frigate could outshoot the average Dutch warship. However, according to public opinion there was only one to blame for the defeat: De With himself. As one of the more polite pamphlets put it, a week after the battle:

From this disorder and unwillingness to fight it can be seen and noticed what difference it makes whether one has or appoints a Head of a fleet who is judicious, polite and popular – or whether one imposes on the men a Head who is unloved, despised by the men and unsavoury to them. Vice-Admiral De Witt is, we all know this, an excellent soldier and bold Sailor, who fears no danger, nor even death itself. Likewise Commodore de Ruyter is an audacious and fearless Hero, who would not hesitate to engage the worst of enemies, heeding no danger. Notwithstanding all of this, we also know that Admiral Tromp possesses all these same qualities; and besides these uncommon virtues: of being an extraordinary careful, Godfearing and virtuous man who does not call his men dogs, devils, or devil's brood; but children, friends, comrades and similar loving and endearing words to address them with. By which he so much endears those serving under him that they, as they say, would go through fire for him and risk their lives, yes, by manner of speech, would not hesitate to fight the devil. If such a loved and respected Head is then kept from the fleet and replaced by those who displease the men, now it is shown what calamity and disaster this brings with it.

The same evening of the 12th the States-General learned of the defeat, they sent a letter to both Tromp and Johan Evertsen, asking them to return.

The English believed that the Dutch had been all but defeated, and sent twenty ships away to the Mediterranean, a mistake that led to a defeat at the Battle of Dungeness but did not prevent the defeat of the not yet reinforced English Mediterranean fleet at the Battle of Leghorn. In the former battle the Dutch were led again by Tromp; De With had suffered a mental breakdown and would be officially replaced as supreme commander in May 1653.

== Ship lists ==
No complete lists exist and especially the order of battle of the English fleet is poorly known. The Dutch list differs in detail from particular lists of ships from late September 1652 from Witte de With's journal and other archival sources. Known ships include:

=== England (Robert Blake) ===
- Sovereign 106
- Resolution 88
- James 66
- Triumph 60
- Vanguard 58
- Andrew 56
- Speaker 54
- Lion 50
- Convertine 44
- Garland 44
- Advice 42
- Diamond 42
- Foresight 42
- Pelican 42
- Ruby 42
- Assistance 40
- Assurance 40
- Dragon 40
- London 40 (hired merchantman)
- Nonsuch 40
- President 40
- Richard and Martha 40 (hired merchantman)
- Portsmouth 38
- Anthony Bonaventure 36 (hired merchantman)
- Hound 36 (ex-?)
- Guinea 34
- Hercules 34 (hired merchantman)
- Lisbon Merchant 34 (hired merchantman)
- Convert 32 (ex-French)
- Mary 32 (flyboat)
- Exchange 30 (hired merchantman)
- Cullen 28 (hired merchantman)
- Prudent Mary 28 (hired merchantman)
- Advantage 26 (ex-Dutch)
- Falmouth 26 (ex-Dutch)
- Sampson 26 (ex-Dutch)
- Martha 25 (hired merchantman)
- Golden Dove 24 (hired merchantman)
- Old Warwick 24
- Pearl 24
- Acorn 22 (hired merchantman)
- Cygnet 22
- Little President 22
- Nightingale 22
- Gift 16+ (hired merchant pink)
- Paradox 12
- Renown 10 (fireship)

=== Dutch Republic (Witte de With) ===
United Provinces

Ship name
Commander
Guns
Notes
Brederode
Abel Roelantsz
54
Admiralty of the Maze
Prins Willem
Vice-Admiral De With, flagcaptain Jacob Gaeuw
56
Middelburg Chamber of the VOC
Henriëtte Louise or Prinses Louijse
Commodore De Ruyter, flagcaptain Pieter Marcussen
48
Middelburg Chamber of the VOC
Vrede
acting Rear-Admiral Gideon de Wildt
42
Admiralty of Amsterdam
Aartsengel Michiel
Emmanuel Zalingen
40
Admiralty of Amsterdam
Graaf Willem
Rear-Admiral Jan Gideonszoon Verburgh
40
Admiralty of Amsterdam
Groningen
Abraham van der Hulst
40
Admiralty of Amsterdam
Vogelstruys
Douwe Aukes
40
Amsterdam Chamber of the VOC
Vrede
Pieter Salomonszoon
30 (also 40)
Amsterdam Chamber of the VOC
Prins te Paerd or Prins
Corstiaen Corstiaensen
38
Rotterdam Directorate
Drie Coningen
Lucas Aelbrechtssen or Albertszoon
36
Admiralty of Amsterdam
Engel Gabriël
Isaac Sweers
36
Admiralty of Amsterdam
Prinses Louise
De With on second day
36
Admiralty of the Maze or Rotterdam
Zeelandia
Lieutenant-commandeur Nicolaes Marrevelt
36
Admiralty of Amsterdam
Hollandia
Albert Claessen de Graeff
32
Admiralty of Amsterdam
Amsterdam
Adriaan Kempen
30
Admiralty of Zealand
Faeme
Cornelis Loncke
30
Admiralty of Zealand
Gorcum
Jan Jacobsen van Nes, schipper Willem Arentsz Warmont
30
Admiralty of the Maze or Rotterdam; captured and recaptured
Gouden Leeuw
Jacob Adriaensen Penssen
30
Middelburg Directorate
Haes in 't Veldt
Leendert den Haen
30
Stad Middelburg
Haes
Bastiaen Centsen
30
Vlissingen Directors
Liefde
Frans Crijssen Mangelaer
30
Z
Maria
Claes Sael
30
Admiralty of Amsterdam; captured
Wapen van Enckhuysen
Gerrit Femssen
30
Admiralty of the Northern Quarter
Witte Lam
Cornelis van Houten
30
Amsterdam Directorate
Arke Troijane
Abraham van Campen
28
Amsterdam Directorate
Breda
acting Rear-Admiral Adriaan Bruynsveld
28
Admiralty of Friesland
Zeeuwsche Leeuw
Commodore Cornelis Evertsen the Elder
28
Admiralty of Zealand
Campen
Joris van der Zaen
40
Admiralty of Amsterdam
Gelderland
Cornelis van Velsen
28
Admiralty of Amsterdam
Gouda
Jan Egbertsen Ooms
28
Admiralty of Amsterdam
Leyden
Cornelis Holla
28
Admiralty of Amsterdam
Prins Maurits
Cornelis Pietersen Taenman
28
Admiralty of the Noorderkwartier
Sint Franscisco
Stoffel Juriaenssen
28
Amsterdam Directorate
Sint Pieter
lieutenant-commandeur Jan Janssen van der Valck
28
Rotterdam Directorate
Star
Jacob Paulussen Cort
28
Admiralty of Amsterdam
Westergo
lieutenant-commandeur Tijmen Claessen
28
Admiralty of Friesland
Zeeridder
Gilles Janssen
28
Admiralty of Zealand
Zutphen
Ewout Jeroensen
28
Admiralty of Amsterdam
Dubbele Arend
Allert Janssen, lieutenant Teunis Post
26
Vlissingen Directorate
Kasteel van Medemblick
Gabriël Antheunissen
26
Admiralty of the Noorderkwartier
Sint Jan
Laurens Lispensier
26
Admiralty of Zealand
Ter Goes
Cornelis Cuyper
26
Admiralty of Zealand
Achilles
Dirk Schey
28
Admiralty of Amsterdam
Burgh van Alkmaer or Wapen van Alkmaer
Gerrit Nobel
28
Admiralty of the Noorderkwartier; blown up
Hector van Troijen
Reinier Sekema
24
Admiralty of Friesland
Hollandsche Tuyn
Hilbrandt Jeroensen
24
Admiralty of Amsterdam
Monnick
Arent Dircksen
24
Admiralty of the Noorderkwartier
Sandenburg
Pieter Gorcum
24
Admiralty of Zealand
Frisia
Schelte Wiglema
28
Admiralty of Friesland
Eenhoorn
Laurens Josiassen

fireship
Graaf Sonderlandt
Hendrick Janssen

fireship
Vergulde Buys
Ary Cornelissen

fireship
Vos
Jan Jacobsen

fireship
