= HMS Triumph (1698) =

90-gun second rate ship

History

Great Britain
- Name: Triumph
- Builder: Robert Lee, Chatham Dockyard
- Launched: 2 March 1697
- Renamed: HMS Prince, 1714
- Fate: Broken up, 1773
- Notes: Participated in: Battle of Lagos

General characteristics as built
- Class & type: 90-gun second rate ship of the line
- Tons burthen: 1482 44/94 bm
- Length: 160 ft 1 in (48.8 m) (gundeck)
- Beam: 46 ft 1.5 in (14.1 m)
- Depth of hold: 18 ft 3 in (5.6 m)
- Sail plan: Full-rigged ship
- Complement: 90 gun, comprising: 22 demi-cannons; 30 culverins; 36 sakers; 2 × 3-pounders

General characteristics after 1750 rebuild
- Class & type: 1741 proposals 90-gun second rate ship of the line
- Tons burthen: 1677 bm
- Length: 168 ft (51.2 m) (gundeck)
- Beam: 48 ft (14.6 m)
- Depth of hold: 20 ft 2 in (6.1 m)
- Propulsion: Sails
- Sail plan: Full-rigged ship
- Armament: 90 guns: Gundeck: 26 × 32 pdrs; Middle gundeck: 26 × 18 pdrs; Upper gundeck: 26 × 12 pdrs; Quarterdeck: 10 × 6 pdrs; Forecastle: 2 × 6 pdrs

HMS Triumph was a 90-gun second rate ship of the line of the Royal Navy, launched at Chatham Dockyard on 2 March 1697. She was renamed HMS Prince in 1714.

Triumph was commissioned in February 1702 as the flagship of Admiral Sir George Rooke. Rooke's flag captains were William Bokenham and John Fletcher, though Bokenham was transferred to another vessel five months later. In November 1702 the ship passed to Rear-Admiral Sir John Graydon, with Captain Richard Hughes as flag-captain. After a voyage with Rooke's squadron to the Spanish port of Cádiz, the ship was paid off in December and her crew dispersed to other vessels.

Triumph was recommissioned in March 1703 under Captain James Stewart, as the flagship of Admiral Cloudisley Shovell. She was assigned to cruise off the Spanish Mediterranean coastline, and was again paid off in March 1704.

She was renamed Prince in 1714. On 13 December 1742 Prince was ordered to be taken to pieces and rebuilt at Chatham, according to the 1741 proposals of the 1719 Establishment. She was relaunched on 8 August 1750.

Prince continued to serve until 1773, when she was broken up.

== Sources ==
- Lavery, Brian (1983) The Ship of the Line – Volume 1: The development of the battlefleet 1650–1850. Conway Maritime Press. ISBN 0-85177-252-8.
- Michael Phillips. Triumph (90) (1698). Michael Phillips' Ships of the Old Navy. Retrieved 1 February 2008.
- Winfield, Rif (2009). British Warships in the Age of Sail: 1603–1714. Seaforth Publishing. ISBN 9781848320406.
