= HMY Saudadoes =

English royal yacht

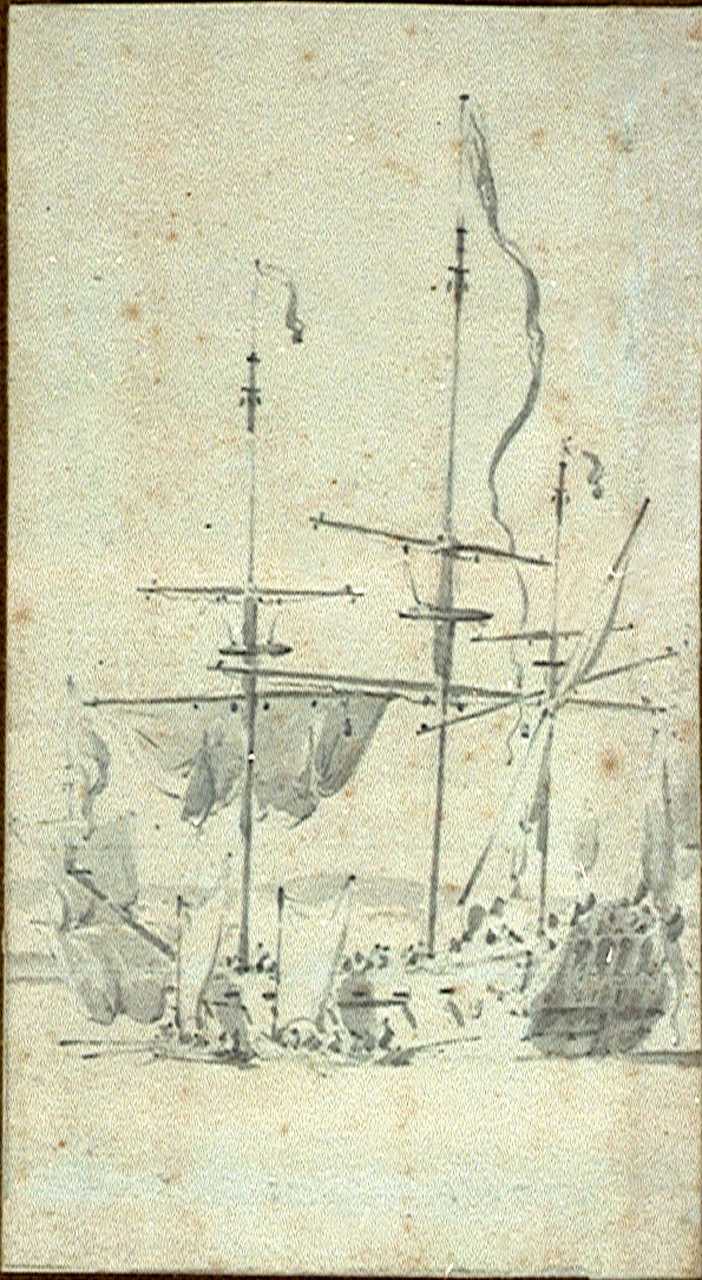
Saudadoes circa 1677

HMY Saudadoes was a royal yacht built in 1670 on the orders of King Charles II of England for his Queen, Catherine of Braganza. It was used for pleasure trips on the River Thames and to maintain communications with the Queen's homeland of Portugal, making the journey twice.

== Service ==
As built the yacht had an approximate tonnage of 86 tons, drawing 8 feet (2.4 m), with a beam of 18 feet (5.5 m) and a length overall of 50 feet (15 m). The vessel was more than doubled in tonnage to 188 tons when rebuilt in 1674, becoming a sixth-rate of 16 guns. This "rebuild" may in fact denote the transfer of the name to a completely different vessel:

"This vessel is supposed to have been commissioned as a substitute for a yacht, and specially destined to the queen's use. The idea appears in some measure confirmed, by a note relative to captain Jennifer's appointment, in which it is said to have been made by the queen herself."

Captain John Jennifer was appointed to command Saudadoes in December 1674. He later commanded HMS Edgar at the Battle of Beachy Head in 1690.

Saudadoes after being re-built in 1674, was commissioned as HMS Saudadoes (some sources spell the name Soldado) under command of John Graydon taking part in the Battle of Bantry Bay in May 1689, as a fireship. The 'Soldado's coxswain, a young sailor John Dann, later deserted and joined Henry Every in what became known as the most profitable raid in history.

In September 1692 she captured a French ship which was renamed HMS Saudadoes Prize.

== Name ==
The vessel's unusual name is Portuguese (correctly Saudades). The name was evidently chosen by Queen Catherine herself, and gives an insight into her character expressing deep feelings of wistful longing for an absent person or place left behind. The spelling of this ship's name in naval documents varies: usually Saudadoes, but sometimes Sandadoe, Sandadoes, Sandados, Saudados, Soldadoes, Soldados, Suadades, or Suadadoes.
