= English ship Plymouth (1653) =

Ship of the line of the Royal Navy

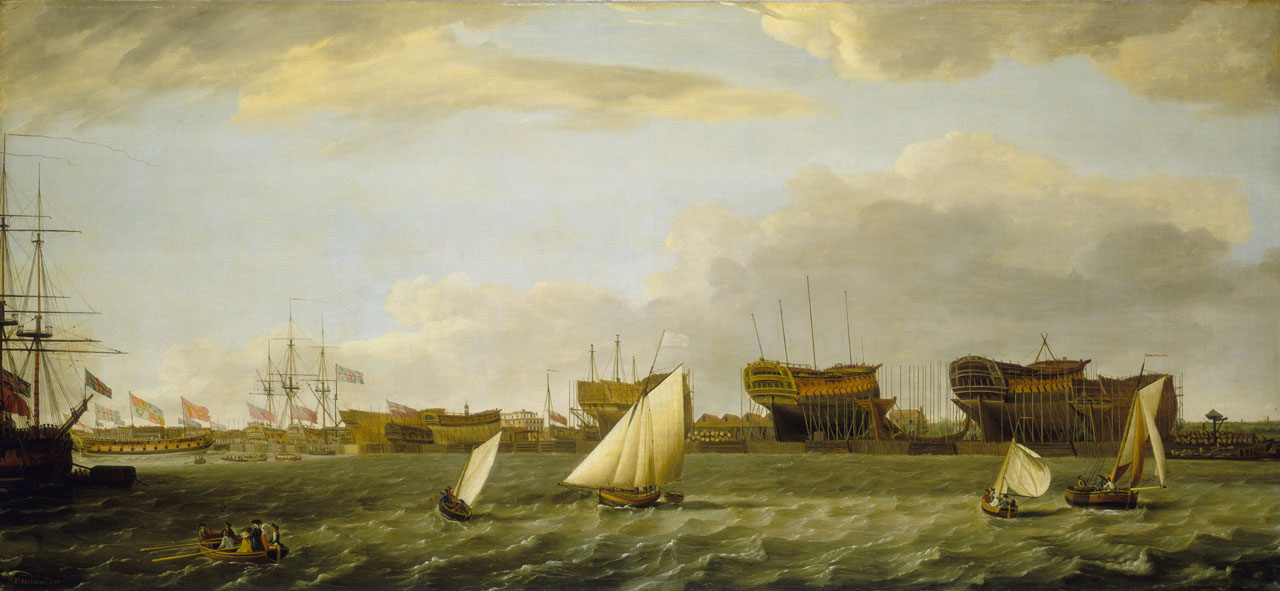

History

England
- Name: HMS Plymouth
- Namesake: Plymouth
- Builder: Taylor, Wapping
- Launched: 1653
- Honours and awards: Participated in: Action of 14 April 1655; Battle of Santa Cruz de Tenerife; Battle of Lowestoft; Action of 1 September 1665; Four Days Battle; St James Day Battle; Battle of Solebay; Battle of Texel; Action of November 1678; Battle of Bantry Bay; Battle of Beachy Head; Battle of Barfleur; Action of 18 January 1695; Action of 5 February 1697
- Fate: Foundered, 1705

General characteristics as built
- Class & type: Speaker-class frigate
- Tons burthen: 74149/94 (bm)
- Length: 116 ft (35.4 m) (keel)
- Beam: 34 ft 8 in (10.6 m)
- Depth of hold: 14 ft 6 in (4.4 m)
- Propulsion: Sails
- Sail plan: Full-rigged ship
- Armament: 52 guns (at launch); 60 guns (1677)

General characteristics after 1705 rebuild
- Class & type: 60-gun fourth-rate ship of the line
- Tons burthen: 83331/94 bm
- Length: 140 ft 5 in (42.8 m) (gundeck)
- Beam: 38 ft 3 in (11.7 m)
- Depth of hold: 15 ft 7 in (4.7 m)
- Propulsion: Sails
- Sail plan: Full-rigged ship
- Armament: 60 guns of various weights of shot

HMS Plymouth was a 52-gun third-rate frigate, built for the navy of the Commonwealth of England and launched at Wapping in 1653. By 1677 her armament had been increased to 60 guns.

Plymouth was rebuilt at Blackwall Yard in 1705 as a 60-gun fourth-rate ship of the line. She sunk later that year and was lost.
