= English ship Centurion (1650) =

Ship of the line of the Royal Navy

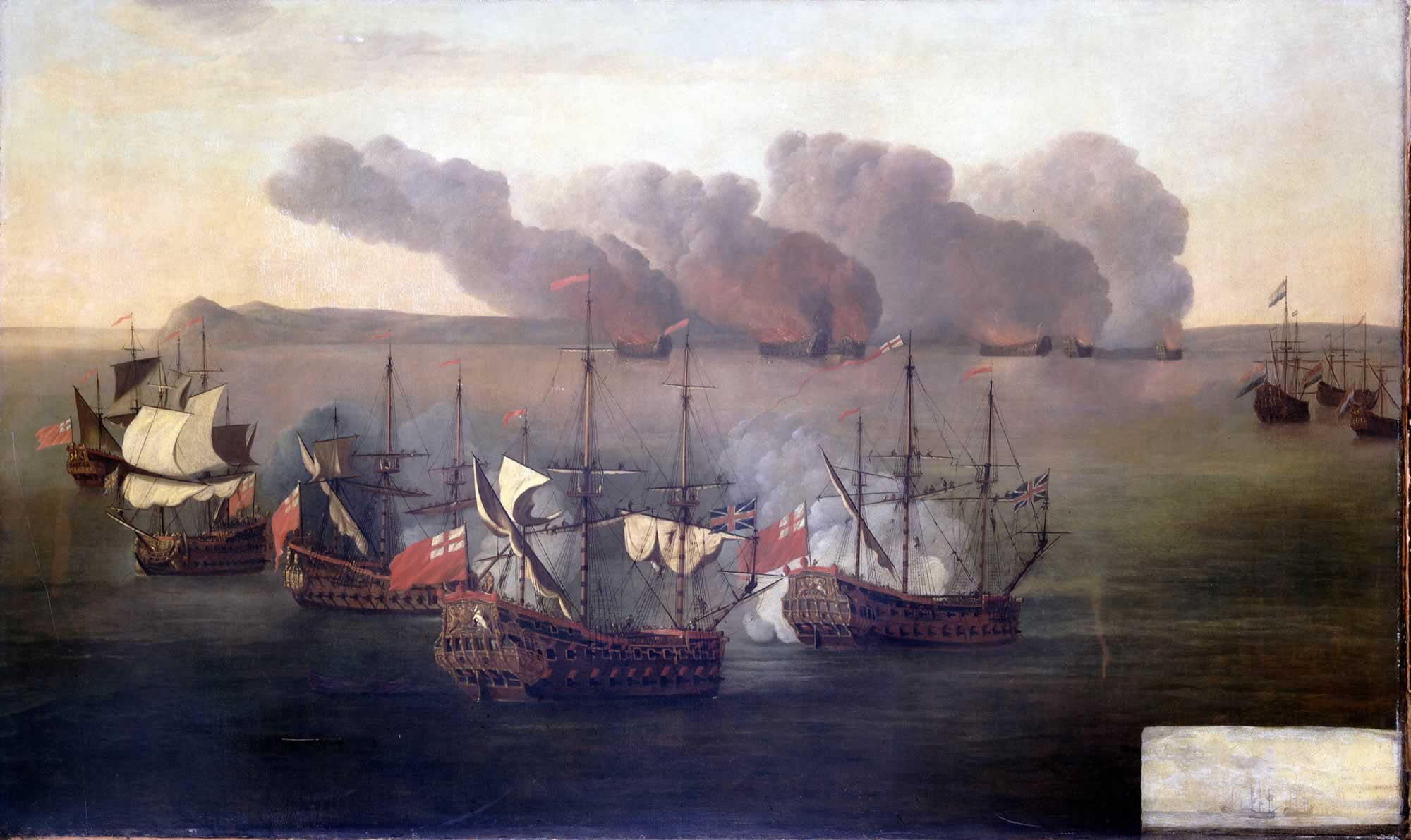
- Commodore Richard Beach and Dutch Admiral Van Ghent in a joint task force destroy six Barbary ships near Cape Spartel, Morocco, 17 August 1670, Centurion is at the far left

History

Commonwealth of England
- Name: Centurion
- Ordered: December 1649
- Builder: Peter Pett I, Ratcliffe
- Launched: 1650
- Commissioned: 1650
- Honours and awards: Dover 1652; Portland 1653; Gabbard 1653; Scheveningen 1653; Santa Cruz 1657

Kingdom of England
- Acquired: May 1660
- Honours and awards: Lowestoft; Orfordness 1666
- Fate: Wrecked in a storm 25 December 1689

General characteristics
- Class & type: 42-gun Fourth rate
- Tons burthen: 531 58/94 tons (bm)
- Length: 104 ft 3 in (31.8 m) keel for tonnage
- Beam: 31 ft 0 in (9.4 m)
- Depth of hold: 15 ft 6 in (4.7 m)
- Propulsion: Sails
- Sail plan: ship-rigged
- Complement: 180 personnel; 230/200/150 personnel in 1688
- Armament: 50 guns – 1653; 48 guns – under 1666 establishment; 22 × culverins (LD); 20 × demi-culverins (UD); 6 × sakers (QD); 1681 52 guns; 22 × culverins (LD); 22 × 8-pounder guns (UD); 8 × Minions (QD); 1685 Establishment; 22 × culverin drakes (LD); 22 × 8-pounder guns (UD); 6 × saker cutts (QD)

HMS Centurion was one of six 40-gun fourth-rate frigates, built for the Commonwealth of England under the 1650 Programme, she would be transferred to the navy of the Kingdom of England upon the Restoration of the monarchy in May 1660. When commissioned she partook in the First Anglo-Dutch War. After the first war ended she was in the Mediterranean fighting the Algerines at the Battle of Santa Cruz. She fought the battles of Dover, Portland, the Gabbard, and Scheveningen. During the Second Anglo-Dutch War she partook in the battles of Lowestoft and Orfordness. Following the second war she spent her time either in North America or the Mediterranean. She was wrecked in a storm in December 1689.

Centurion was the first named vessel in the English and Royal Navy.

== Construction and specifications ==
She was one of six frigates ordered in December 1649. She would be built under contract by Peter Pett I of Ratcliffe at a contract price of £6.10.0d (Note: The cost accounting for inflation of approximately £1,000 in reference to today) per ton. She was launched in 1650. Her dimensions were 104 feet 0 inches (31.7 metres) keel for tonnage with a breadth of 31 feet 0 inches (9.4 metres) and a depth of hold of 15 feet 6 inches (4.7 metres). Her tonnage was 531 58/94 tons.

Her gun armament in 1653 was 50 guns. In 1666 her armament was 48 guns and consisted of twenty culverins (Note: The culverin was a gun of 4,500 pounds with a 5.5-inch bore firing a 17.5-pound shot with a twelve-pound powder charge) on the lower deck (LD), twenty-two demi-culverines (Note: The demi-culverin was a gun of 3,400 pounds with a four-inch bore firing a 9.5-pound shot with an eight-pound powder charge) on the upper deck two 6-pounder guns (Note: The 6-pounder gun was a weapon of Dutch manufacture. These guns were highly favoured by the British and used and copied extensively) and four sakers (Note: The sacar or saker was a gun of 1,400 pounds with a 3.5-inch bore firing a 4-pound shot with a 4-pound powder charge) on the quarterdeck (QD). In 1677 her gun establishment was unchanged except now the upper deck was supposed to have 8-pounder guns but she actually carried 6-pounder guns. By 1681 her gun count had risen to 52 guns consisting of twenty-two culverins, twenty-two 8-pounder guns (Note: The 8-pounder gun was a weapon of Dutch manufacture. These guns were not liked by the British and were used only when there was no other option) and eight minions. (Note: The minion was a gun of 1,000 pounds with a 3.5-inch bore firing a 4-pound shot with a 4-pound powder charge) Under the 1685 Establishment her guns had dropped to 50 guns consisting of twenty-two culverin drakes, (Note: Drakes are a lightweight cannon that fired mainly grapeshot) twenty-two 8-pounder guns and six saker cutts. (Note: The cutt was a gun that had been shortened due to damage) Her manning was 180 personnel in 1653 and remained so until 1688 when it was 230/200/150 personnel.

She was completed at an initial cost of £3,451.10.0d. (Note: The cost accounting for inflation of approximately £542,100 in reference to today)

== Commissioned service ==
=== Service in the Commonwealth Navy ===
She was commissioned in 1650 under the command of Captain William Penn. In 1651 she was under Captain John Lawson for service in Scottish Waters. Later in the year she sail with William Penn's Squadron to the Mediterranean.

==== First Anglo-Dutch War ====
In 1652 she was under Captain Walter Wood. She was at the Battle of Dover on 19 May 1652. She followed that with the Battle of Portland as a member of Robert Blakes Squadron on the 18 February 1653. She was involved in the Battle of the Gabbard as a member of White Squadron, Van Division on 2–3 June 1653. She partook in the Battle of Scheveningen as a member of White Squadron, Van Division on 25 July 1653. Later in 1653 she was under Captain Robert Nixon for the winter of 1653/54 on the Dutch coast.

She joined Robert Blake's Fleet in the Mediterranean in 1655. In 1656 she was under the command of Captain Anthony Spatchurst. She was at the Battle of Santa Cruz on 20 April 1657. During 1659/60 she was under command of Captain Francis Parke for operations in the Sound.

=== Service After the Restoration May 1660 ===
Later in 1660 she was under the command of Captain John Coppin. On 22 March 1661 she under Captain Christopher Myngs until 2 September 1663, taking part in the successful raid on Santiago de Cuba.

==== Second Anglo-Dutch War ====
On 17 August 1664 she was under command of Captain Robert Moulton. As a member of Blue Squadron, Center Division she participated in the Battle of Lowestoft on 3 June 1665. On 13 June 1665 she was under Captain Daniel Helling. On 25 August 1665 she was under command of Captain Mark Harrison. Captain John Hubbard took over on 22 February 1666. She partook in the St James Day Battle as a member of White Squadron, Van Division from 25 June to 6 July 1666. Captain Charles Wylde took over on 7 July 1666 until 19 March 1667.

In 1668 She was under command of Captain William Coleman. On 9 April 1669 she was under Captain Peter Bowen sailing with Sir Thomas Allin's squadron in the Mediterranean. On 1 February 1673 Captain Wylde took command once more (until 3 October 1674) remaining in the Mediterranean. Captain Roger Strickland was her commander from 23 November to 24 December 1677. Captain Richard Carter was her commander from 11 January 1678 to 24 October 1681. Captain Ralph Wrenn took over on 12 June 1682 for a Newfoundland convoy in 1682 then for service in Home Waters until 17 August 1685. In August 1688 she returned to active service under Captain Thomas Ashton quickly followed by Captain Francis Wheeler in September and later in 1688 Captain Edward Elliot. On 21 April 1689 she came under command of Captain Basil Beaumont.

== Loss ==
She was wrecked in a storm in Plymouth Sound on 25 December 1689.
