= English ship Reserve (1650) =

Ship of the line of the Royal Navy

History

Commonwealth of England
- Name: Reserve
- Ordered: December 1649
- Builder: Peter Pett II, Woodbridge
- Launched: 1650
- Commissioned: 1650

Kingdom of England
- Name: Reserve
- Launched: 1650
- Acquired: May 1660
- Honours and awards: Lowestoft 1665; Four Days' Battle 1666; Orfordness 1666; Barfleur 1692
- Fate: Foundered off Yarmouth 27 November 1703

General characteristics as built
- Class & type: 40-gun Fourth-rate
- Tons burthen: 513 87/94 tons bm
- Length: 118 ft 4 in (36.1 m) gundeck; 100 ft 0 in (30.5 m) keel for tonnage
- Beam: 31 ft 1 in (9.5 m)
- Depth of hold: 15 ft 6.5 in (4.7 m)
- Sail plan: ship-rigged
- Complement: 180 personnel
- Armament: 44 guns in 1653; 48 in 1666; 22 × culverins (LD); 20 × demi-culverins (UD); 6 × sakers (QD) (2 sakers added in 1677); 48 guns in 1685; 22 × culverins (LD); 22 × demi-culverins (UD); 4 × sakers (QD)

General characteristics after 1700/01 rebuild
- Class & type: 50-gun Fourth-rate
- Tons burthen: 579 80/94 tons bm
- Length: 117 ft 6 in (35.8 m) gundeck; 96 ft 5 in (29.4 m) keel for tonnage
- Beam: 33 ft 7.5 in (10.2 m)
- Depth of hold: 13 ft 0 in (4.0 m)
- Sail plan: ship-rigged
- Armament: 50/46 guns 1703 Establishment; 20/18 × 12-pounder guns (LD); 20/18 × 6-pounder guns (UD); 6/4 × 6-pounder guns (QD); 2 × 6-pounder guns (Fc)

HMS Reserve was one of six 40-gun fourth-rate frigates, built for the Commonwealth of England under the 1650 Programme, after the Restoration of the monarchy in 1660 she was incorporated into the navy of the Kingdom of England. She partook in no major Fleet actions during the First Anglo-Dutch War. After the Restoration during the Second Anglo-Dutch War she partook in the Battle of Lowestoft, the Four Days' Battle and the St James Day Battle. She spent the bulk of her service either in the Mediterranean or at Newfoundland. She foundered off Yarmouth in November 1703.

Reserve was the first named vessel in the English and Royal Navies.

== Construction and specifications ==
She was ordered in December 1649 to be built under contract by Peter Pett II at Woodbridge on the River Thames. She was launched in 1650. Her dimensions were gundeck 118 feet 0 inches (36.0 metres) with 100 feet 0 inches (30.5 metres) keel for tonnage with a breadth of 31 feet 1 inch (9.5 metres) and a depth of hold of 15 feet 6.5 inches (4.7 metres). Her tonnage was 513 87/94 tons. She was remeasured at a later date and her dimensions changed to gundeck 118 feet 4 inches (36.1 metres) with 100 feet 0 inches (30.5 metres) keel for tonnage with a breadth of 31 feet 10 inches (9.7 metres) and a depth of hold of 12 feet 8 inches (3.9 metres). Her tonnage was 573 tons.

Her gun armament in 1653 was 44 guns. In 1666 her armament was 48 guns and consisted of twenty-two culverins (Note: The culverin was a gun of 4,500 pounds with a 5.5-inch bore firing a 17.5-pound shot with a twelve-pound powder charge) on the lower deck (LD), twenty demi-culverines (Note: The demi-culverin was a gun of 3,400 pounds with a four-inch bore firing a 9.5-pound shot with an eight-pound powder charge) on the upper deck and six sakers (Note: The sacar or saker was a gun of 1,400 pounds with a 3.5-inch bore firing a 4-pound shot with a 4-pound powder charge) on the quarterdeck (QD). In 1685 her guns were established at 48 guns. She now carried twenty-two culverins, twenty-two demi-culverins and four sakers Her manning was 180 personnel in 1653 and 1666.

She was completed with a first cost of £3,334 (Note: The cost accounting for inflation of approximately £501,200 in reference to today.) or 513 tons @ £6.10.0d (Note: The cost accounting for inflation of approximately £900 in reference to today.) per ton.

== Commissioned service ==
=== Service in the Commonwealth Navy ===
She was commissioned in 1650 under the command of Captain Robert Clarke for the North Coast. Later in 1653 she was under Captain Robert Taylor. In 1654 Captain Robert Plumleigh was in command for operations in the Sound in 1659. Then she sailed to Newfoundland for fishery protection in 1660.

=== Service after the Restoration May 1660 ===
From 9 August 1662 until 29 September 1663 she was under the command of Captain Robert Holmes. Captain John Hayward held command from 4 September 1664 until 2 April 1665.

==== Second Anglo-Dutch War ====
Captain John Tyrwitt took command on 4 April 1665. She was at the Battle of Lowestoft as a member of White Squadron, Center Division on 3 June 1665. She arrived at the Four Days' Battle on 4 June 1666 with Prince Rupert's Squadron as a member of the Rear Division. She partook in the St James Day Battle as a member of Blue Squadron, Rear Division on 25 July 1666. Captain Ralph Lassels held command from 23 September 1666 until 19 January 1667 when Captain Christopher Gunman took over. The Second Anglo-Dutch War ended on 31 July 1667.

Captain Gunman remained in command until 3 August 1668. Captain Thomas Elliot held command from 23 August to 15 January 1672. Captain Jasper Grant was her commander from 28 April 1672 until 14 October 1673. She went to the Mediterranean in 1673, when he was relieved of command then dismissed from the Navy by court-martial in 1674. Captain Thomas Willshaw took over command on 17 October and remained her commander until 27 June 1674 remaining in the Mediterranean. On 22 March 1675 Captain Edward Russel took command for service in Newfoundland until 19 June 1677. Captain David Lloyd was her commander from 4 June 1678 until 2 June 1679 for service in the English Channel. Captain Lawrence Wright took her to Newfound during his tenure as commander from 3 June 1679 until 5 June 1680. She was under command of Captain Henry Priestman while in the Mediterranean from 14 August to 13 May 1683. She was briefly under the command of Captain George Aylmer from 20 June to 13 August 1685. In August 1685 Captain Dominick Nugent took over command until 3688 as guardship at Portsmouth. In 1689 she was under Captain George Byng until Captain Richard Keigwin took over in June. Captain Thomas Crawley had command from 1691 to 1693. She was in the Mediterranean then at the Battle of Barfleur between 19 and 24 May 1692. Afterwards she escorted a convoy to Newfoundland in 1693. In 1694 she was under command of Captain James Lance at the Nore. In 1696 she came under command of Captain John Moses who first went to Jamaica in 1696, then to Newfoundland in 1697. She was placed for sale in 1698, however, she was ordered rebuilt at Deptford in 1701.

=== Rebuild at Deptford Dockyard 1700-01 ===
She was ordered on 20 May 1700 to be rebuilt at Deptford Dockyard under the guidance of Master Shipwright Fisher Harding. She was launched in 1701. Her dimensions were gundeck 117 feet 6 inches (35.8 metres) with 96 feet 5 inches (29.4 metres) keel for tonnage with a breadth of 33 feet 7.5 inches (10.2 metres) and a depth of hold of 13 feet 0 inches (4.0 metres). Her tonnage was 579 80/94 tons.

Under the 1703 Establishment her armament was 50 guns wartime and 46 guns peacetime and consisted of twenty/eighteen 12-pounder guns on the lower deck (LD), twenty/eighteen 6-pounder guns on the upper deck, six/four 6-pounder guns on the quarterdeck (QD) and two 6-pounder guns on the foc's'le (Fc). Her manning under the 1703 Establishment was 230/200/160 personnel.

=== Service after 1700-01 Rebuild ===
She was commissioned in 1702 under the command of Captain Richard Haddock for service with Leake's squadron in Newfoundland waters. In 1703 she was under command of Captain John Anderson.

== Loss ==
She foundered off Yarmouth on 27 November 1703 during the Great Storm of 1703.
