= English ship Advice (1650) =

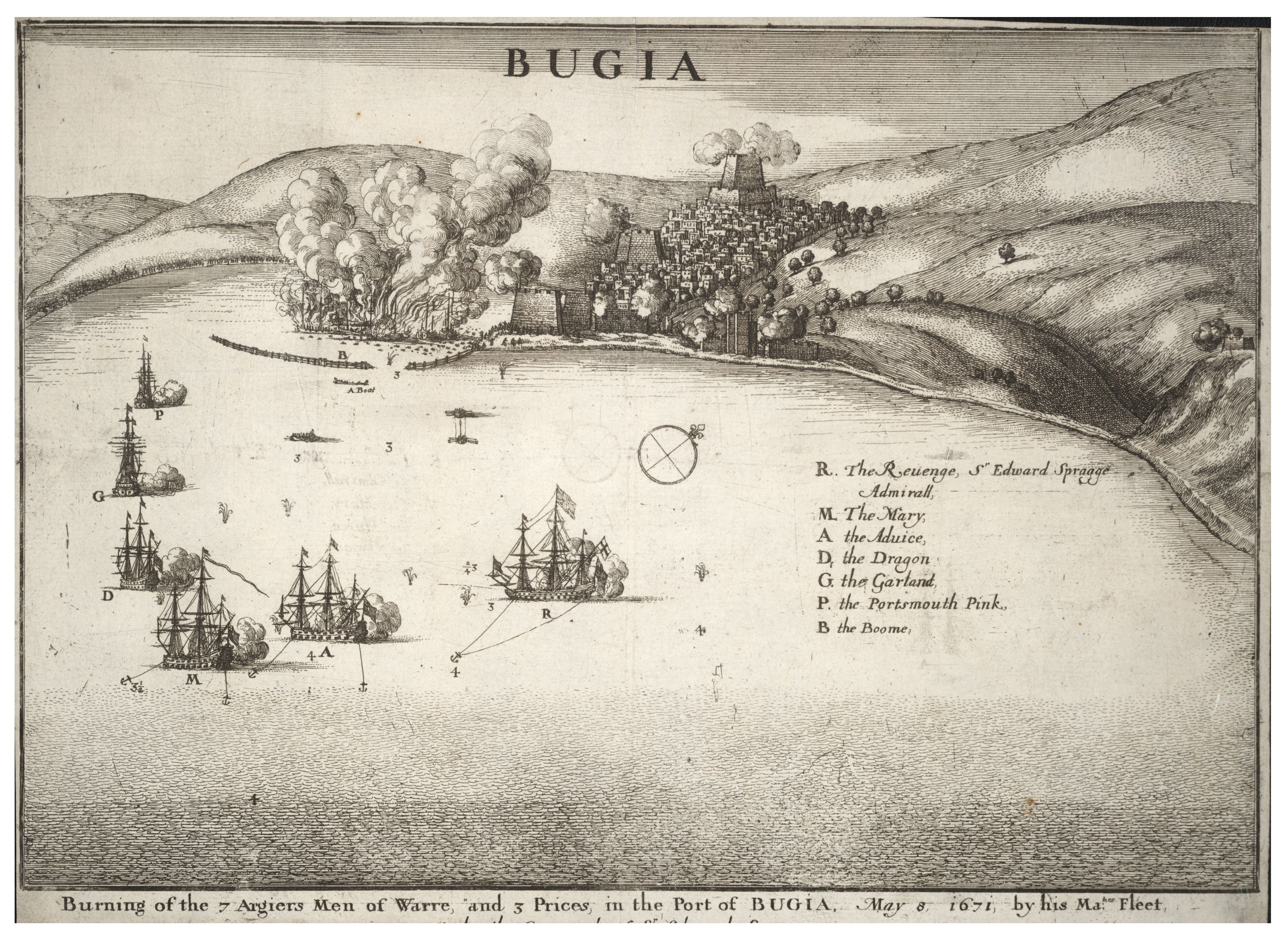
- Advice at the battle of Bugia, 8 May 1671

History

Commonwealth of England
- Name: Advice
- Ordered: December 1649
- Builder: Peter Pett II, Woodbridge
- Launched: 1650
- Commissioned: 1650
- Honours and awards: Kentish Knock 1652; Portland 1653; Gabbard 1653; Scheveningen 1653

Kingdom of England
- Acquired: May 1660
- Honours and awards: Lowestoft; Orfordness 1666; Bugia 1671; Solebay 1672; Schooneveld 1673; Texel 1673; Bantry Bay 1689

Great Britain
- Acquired: 1707 Act of Union
- Captured: 27 June 1711, by French privateers

General characteristics as built
- Class & type: 42-gun Fourth-rate
- Tons burthen: 516 64/94 tons (bm)
- Length: 118 ft 0 in (36.0 m) gundeck; 100 ft 1 in (30.5 m) keel for tonnage
- Beam: 31 ft 2 in (9.5 m)
- Depth of hold: 12 ft 3 in (3.7 m)
- Sail plan: ship-rigged
- Armament: 40 guns (1660); 48 guns (1677); 22 × culverins (LD); 20 × demi-culverins (UD); 4 × sakers (QD)

General characteristics after 1698 rebuild
- Class & type: 50/44-gun fourth-rate
- Tons burthen: 551 86/94 tons (bm)
- Length: 118 ft 0 in (36.0 m) gundeck; 99 ft 3 in (30.3 m) keel for tonnage
- Beam: 32 ft 4 in (9.9 m)
- Depth of hold: 12 ft 1 in (3.7 m)
- Sail plan: ship-rigged
- Armament: 50/44 guns; 20/18 × 12-pounder guns (LD); 20/18 × 6-pounder guns (UD); 6/4 × 6-pounder guns (QD); 2 × 6-pounder guns (Fc)

Advice was one of six 40-gun fourth-rate frigates, built for the Commonwealth of England under the 1650 Programme, she would be transferred to the navy of the Kingdom of England upon the Restoration of the monarchy in May 1660. During her time with the Commonwealth Navy she would fight in two major fleet engagements of the First Anglo-Dutch War, these being the Battle of Portland and the Battle of the Gabbard. After the Restoration she would be involved in the Second Anglo-Dutch War, specifically the Battle of Lowestoft and the St James Day Battle. She would also be present at the attack on the Vlie, better known as Holmes' Bonfire. She would see action against the Algerines at the Battle of Bugia. During the Third Anglo-Dutch War she would do battle at the Battle of Solebay, the Battle of Schooneveld and the Battle of the Texel. She would also do battle against the French at the Battle of Bantry Bay. She would see service in both the West and East Indies before being rebuilt at Woolwich.

Advice was the second named vessel since it was used for a 9-gun pinnace launched at Woolwich Dockyard in 1586 and sold in 1617.

== Construction and specifications ==
She was one of six frigates ordered in December 1649. She would be built under contract by Peter Pett II of Woodbridge at a contract price of £6.10.0d (Note: The cost accounting for inflation of approximately £1,000 in reference to today) per ton. She was launched in 1650. Her dimensions were gundeck 118 feet 6 inches (36.1 metres) with 100 feet 0 inches (30.5 metres) keel for tonnage with a breadth of 31 feet 2 inches (9.5 metres) and a depth of hold of 15 feet 7 inches (4.7 metres). Her tonnage was 516 64/94 tons. She was remeasured at a later date and her dimensions changed to breadth of 32 feet 0 inches (9.8 metres) and a depth of hold of 12 feet 4 inches (3.8 metres) with a draught of 15 feet 0 inches (4.6 metres). Her tonnage was 544 tons.

Her gun armament in 1653 was 42 guns. In 1666 her armament was 48 guns and consisted of twenty-two culverins (Note: The culverin was a gun of 4,500 pounds with a 5.5-inch bore firing a 17.5-pound shot with a twelve-pound powder charge) on the lower deck (LD), twenty demi-culverines (Note: The demi-culverin was a gun of 3,400 pounds with a four-inch bore firing a 9.5-pound shot with an eight-pound powder charge) on the upper deck and six sakers (Note: The sacar or saker was a gun of 1,400 pounds with a 3.5-inch bore firing a 4-pound shot with a 4-pound powder charge) on the quarterdeck (QD). By 1677 her armament had been increased to 48 guns. Her manning was 180 personnel in 1653.

She was complete at an initial cost of 3,334.10.0d. (Note: The cost accounting for inflation of approximately £523,700 in reference to today)

== Commissioned service ==
=== Service in the English Civil War and Commonwealth Navy ===
She was commissioned in 1650 under the command of Captain George Dawkins (until 1652) for the west coast of England.

==== First Anglo-Dutch War ====
She partook in the Battle of Kentish Knock under the command of Captain Dawkins on 28 September 1652. In 1653 she was under Captain John Day for the Battle of Portland on 18 February 1653. Later in 1653 she came under Captain Jeremy Smith for the Battle of the Gabbard where she was a member of Red Squadron, Center Division on 2–3 June 1653. At the Battle of Scheveningen on 31 July 1653 she was a member on Red Squadron, Center Division. In the fall of 1653 she was under Captain Francis Allen (until 1660) and cruised the Dutch coast during the winter of 1653/54. In 1659 she was on operations in the Sound.

=== Service after the Restoration May 1660 ===
In June 1660 she was in the Mediterranean under the command of Captain Allen. In 1663 Captain William Poole was in command until early in 1665. He was reappointed on 8 November 1665 until 5 June 1665. In 1664 he sailed with Sir Thomas Allin's squadron in the Mediterranean.

==== Second Anglo-Dutch War ====
On 3 June 1666 she partook in the Battle of Lowestoft as a member of White Squadron, Rear Division. She was damaged in a collision with Bonaventure on 29 May 1666. Captain Charles O'Bryen took command on 17 July 1666 until 25 November 1667. She partook in the St James Day Battle on 25 July 1666 as a member of Blue Squadron, Rear Division. She followed this with the attack on Dutch shipping in the Vlie estuary (Holmes' Bonfire) on the evening of 9–10 August 1666.

For the period of 1668 through 1670 she was the flagship of Sir John Harman in the Mediterranean. On 17 February 1670 she was temporarily under the command of Captain Henry Narnardiston as Captain Benjamin Young took command on 27 February 1670. Captain Young unfortunately died while in action against seven Algerine pirateers with Guernsey in 1670. On 23 July 1670 Captain John Ashby took command until 30 December 1670. On 12 November 1671 She was under the command of Captain Dominick Nugent. She was at the Battle of Bugia on 8 May 1671.

==== Third Anglo-Dutch War ====
She partook in the Battle of Solebay probably as a member of Red Squadron on 28 May 1672. This was followed a year later with the first and second Battles of the Schooneveld on 28 May 1673 and 4 June 1673. Her last battle in the Third Anglo-Dutch War was the Battle of the Texel on 8 November 1673.

In 1674 she was in the Straits of Gibraltar. From 1678 to 1679 she was under the command of Captain William Houlding as guardship at Portsmouth. In 1688 under Captain Henry Williams, she was with Dartmouth's Fleet in October. Captain John Granville took command in 1689. She was a participant in the Battle of Bantry Bay on 1 May 1689. September 1690 she had a change in commanders when Captain Edward Boys took command. She was in Blue Squadron, Van Division at the Battle of Barfleur between 19 and 22 May 1692. In 1693 Captain Charles Hawkins took command and sailed to the West Indies with Wheeler's Squadron. In 1694 Captain William Harman took command until he was killed in October 1694. In 1695 under Captain Edward Action she was in the East Indies during 1696/97. On her return she was sent to Woolwich for rebuilding in 1698.

=== Rebuild at Woolwich Dockyard 1698 ===
She was ordered to be rebuilt on 24 May 1698 at Woolwich Dockyard under the guidance of Master Shipwright Fisher Harding. She was launched in 1698. Her dimensions were gundeck 118 feet 0 inches (36.0 metres) with 99 feet 3 inches (30.3 metres) keel for tonnage with a breadth of 32 feet 4 inches (9.9 metres) and a depth of hold of 12 feet 1 inch (3.7 metres). Her tonnage was 551 86/94 tons.

She was rated as a 50/44 gun Fourth Rate frigate in 1703. Her armament consisted of twenty/eighteen 12-pounder guns on the lower deck (LD), twenty/eighteen 6-pounder guns on the upper deck, six/four 6-pounder guns on the quarterdeck (QD) and two 6-pounder guns on the foc's'le (Fc). Her manning was 230/200/160 personnel.

=== Service after Rebuild 1698 ===
She was commissioned in 1698 under the command of Robert Wynn. The ship was sent to New England to pick up Captain Kidd ye pirate and bring him to England in April 1700. In 1700 she was under Captain William Cadwell for service in New York until 1702. In 1703 Captain Salmon Morrice took command until 1705. She took an 18-gun vessel (renamed Advice Prize) on 20 May 1704. In August 1705 she was under Captain John Lowen until his court-martial on 27 December 1706, for service in Maryland. 1707 her new commander was Captain Peter Chamberland for service in Newfoundland. She then moved to the North Sea in 1708. In 1710 Captain Lowen was appointed again for further service in the North Sea. In 1711 her commander was Captain Kenneth Sutherland (Lord Duffus).

== Loss ==
On 27 June 1711, while lying in Yarmouth Roads, Advice was attacked by five privateers flying French colours. The French ships lay off Advice's quarter, relieving each other as necessary, and caused a great deal of damage to the sails and rigging. Despite their resistance, Captain Lord Duffus was forced to surrender after two thirds of his crew had been killed or wounded, and he having taken a total of five musket balls to various parts of his body. The privateers took Advice back to Dunkirk.
