= English ship Pelican (1650) =

History

Commonwealth of England
- Name: Pelican
- Ordered: December 1649
- Builder: John Taylor, Wapping
- Launched: 1650
- Commissioned: 1650
- Honours and awards: Kentish Knock 1652; Portland 1653; Gabbard 1653; Scheveninged 1653
- Fate: Accidentally burnt at Portsmouth 13 February 1656

General characteristics
- Class & type: 42-gun Fourth-rate
- Tons burthen: 516 64/94 tons (bm)
- Length: 100 ft 0 in (30.5 m) keel for tonnage
- Beam: 30 ft 8 in (9.3 m)
- Depth of hold: 15 ft 4 in (4.7 m)
- Sail plan: ship-rigged
- Complement: 180 personnel in 1653
- Armament: 42 guns (1653)

The Pelican was one of six 40-gun fourth-rate frigates, built for the Commonwealth of England under the 1650 Programme. After commissioning she partook in the First Anglo-Dutch War being present at the Battles of Kentish Knock, Portland, the Gabbard and Scheveningen. She was accidentally burnt at Portsmouth in early 1656.

Pelican was the fourth named vessel since it was used for an 18-gun ship (privateer), with Drake in 1577, renamed Golden Hind in September 1578, mentioned in 1662 (doubtful if ever in the Navy Royal).

== Construction and specifications ==
She was one of six frigates ordered in December 1649. She would be built under contract by John Taylor of Wapping at a contract price of £6.10.0d (Note: The cost accounting for inflation of approximately £1,100 in reference to today) per ton. She was launched in 1650. Her dimensions were 100 feet 0 inches (30.5 metres) keel for tonnage with a breadth of 30 feet 8 inches (9.3 metres) and a depth of hold of 15 feet 4 inches (4.7 metres). Her tonnage was 500 22/94 tons.

Her gun armament in 1653 was 42 guns. This armament consisted of culverins (Note: The culverin was a gun of 4,500 pounds with a 5.5-inch bore firing a 17.5-pound shot with a twelve-pound powder charge) on the lower deck (LD), demi-culverines (Note: The demi-culverin was a gun of 3,400 pounds with a four-inch bore firing a 9.5-pound shot with an eight-pound powder charge) on the upper deck and sakers (Note: The sacar or saker was a gun of 1,400 pounds with a 3.5-inch bore firing a 4-pound shot with a 4-pound powder charge) on the quarterdeck (QD). Her manning was 180 personnel in 1653.

She was complete at an initial cost of £3,250. (Note: The cost accounting for inflation of approximately £566,000 in reference to today)

== Commissioned service ==
=== Service in the Commonwealth Navy ===
She was commissioned in 1650 under the command of Captain Joseph Jordan for service in Scottish Waters until November when she joined William Penn's Squadron. In 1651 she was with Penn's Squadron in the Mediterranean.

==== First Anglo-Dutch War ====
She was at Ayscue's action on 16 August 1652. She then partook in the Battle of Kentish Knock on 28 September 1652. In 1653 she came under command of Captain John Stoakes. She was with Robert Blake's Fleet at the Battle of Portland on 18 February 1653. After the battle she was temporarily under the Command of Captain John Simmonds until Captain Peter Mootham took command. She participated in the Battle of the Gabbard as a member of Red Squadron, Center Division on 2–3 June 1653. She was a member of Red Squadron, Van Division at the Battle of Scheveningen off Texel on 31 July 1653. Later in 1653 she came under command of Captain William Whitehorse to spend the winter of 1653/54 at St Helens.

In 1655 she came under the command of Captain Robert Storey.

== Loss ==
While anchored at Portsmouth she was accidentally burned on 13 February 1656.
