= John Lawson (Royal Navy officer) =

English naval officer and republican

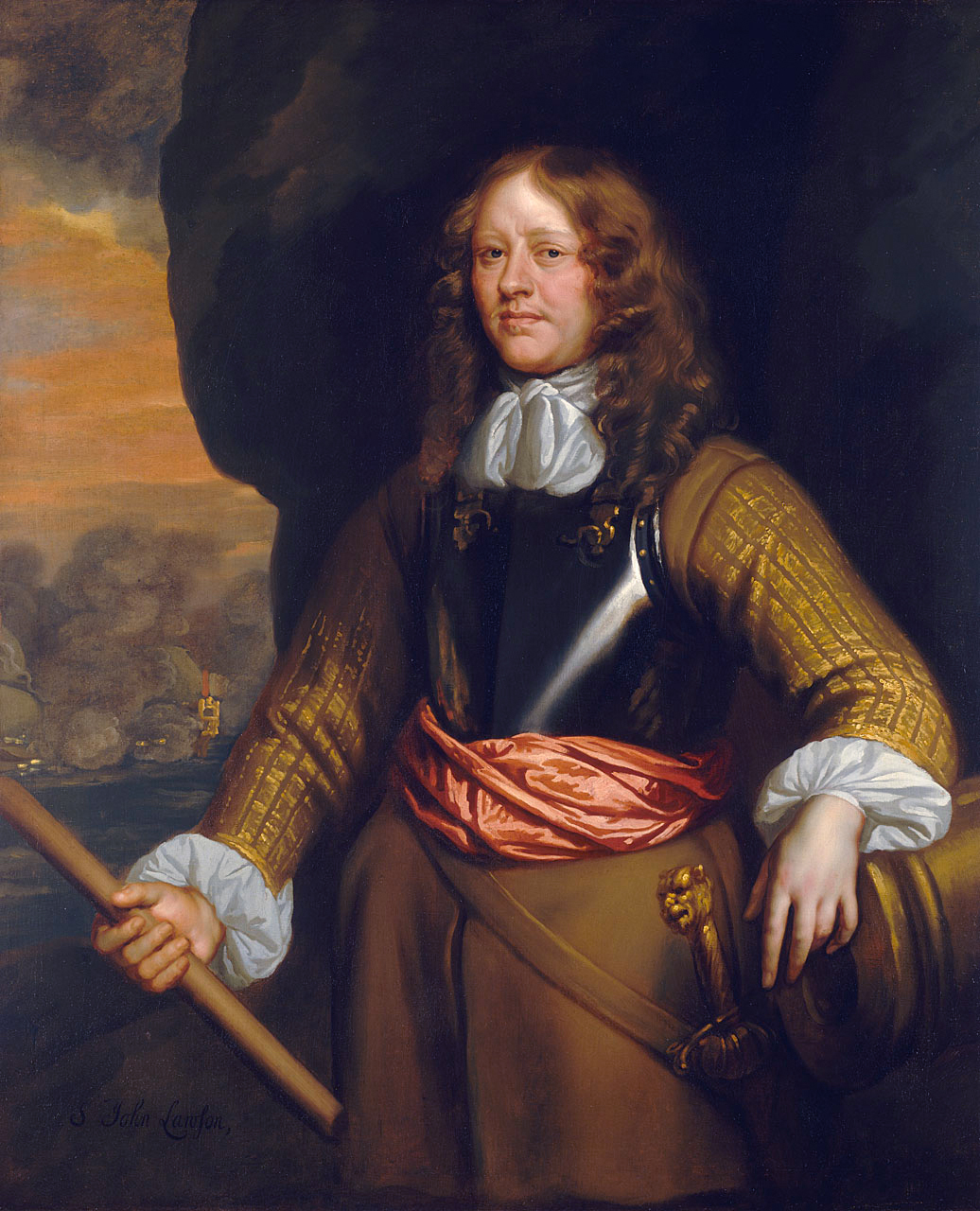
Admiral Sir John Lawson, part of the Flagmen of Lowestoft series by Sir Peter Lely

Sir John Lawson (born c. 1615–1665 at Scarborough, North Yorkshire) was an English naval officer and republican who served in a number of campaigns, including the First Anglo-Dutch War under Admiral Robert Blake, and the Second Anglo-Dutch War in which he died from wounds received in battle.

Lawson was in command of ships in the parliament's service during and after the English Civil War, 1642–6, 1651–3, 1654–6. He was dismissed from the public service, apparently on political grounds in 1656. An anabaptist and republican, he was implicated in the conspiracy of the Fifth Monarchists and arrested in 1657. However, soon released, he was appointed commander-in-chief of the fleet by the Parliament in 1659, commanding as Vice-Admiral aboard the James and later the London, to counter General at sea Edward Montagu. But later on, both co-operated with General George Monck in the restoration of the monarchy in 1660. A grateful King Charles II of England knighted him in 1660.

In June 1661, with his flag in the Swiftsure, Lawson accompanied Montagu, now earl of Sandwich, to the Mediterranean to stem the burgeoning corsair activity. Lawson was present when Sandwich and the Earl of Peterborough took over Tangier and he bought property in the new English possession; Lawson had been enthusiastic in support of taking Tangier when questioned by the King. When Sandwich went to Lisbon to conduct the new Queen Catherine of Braganza to England, Lawson remained in command of a strong squadron with instructions to coerce Algiers, Tunis, and Tripoli into observing treaties not to molest English shipping. After capturing several corsair ships, releasing some two hundred captives and selling about the same number of Moors into slavery, he compelled them to renew the treaties. He returned to England for the winter of 1662–3, and again for that of 1663–1664; and the Algerines, seizing the opportunity, recommenced their piracies. In May, Lawson was again in the Mediterranean, and captured a large corsair of 34 guns (which was put into service as HMS Fountain) at Algiers, but before the corsairs could be further reduced he was ordered home.

Commissioned as the Vice-Admiral of the Red Squadron for the Second Anglo-Dutch War in 1665, and with his flag in HMS Royal Oak, he died on 25 June at Greenwich of a wound received at the Battle of Lowestoft on 3 June which became gangrenous.

Attribution
