= Flagmen of Lowestoft =

Collection of paintings by Peter Lely

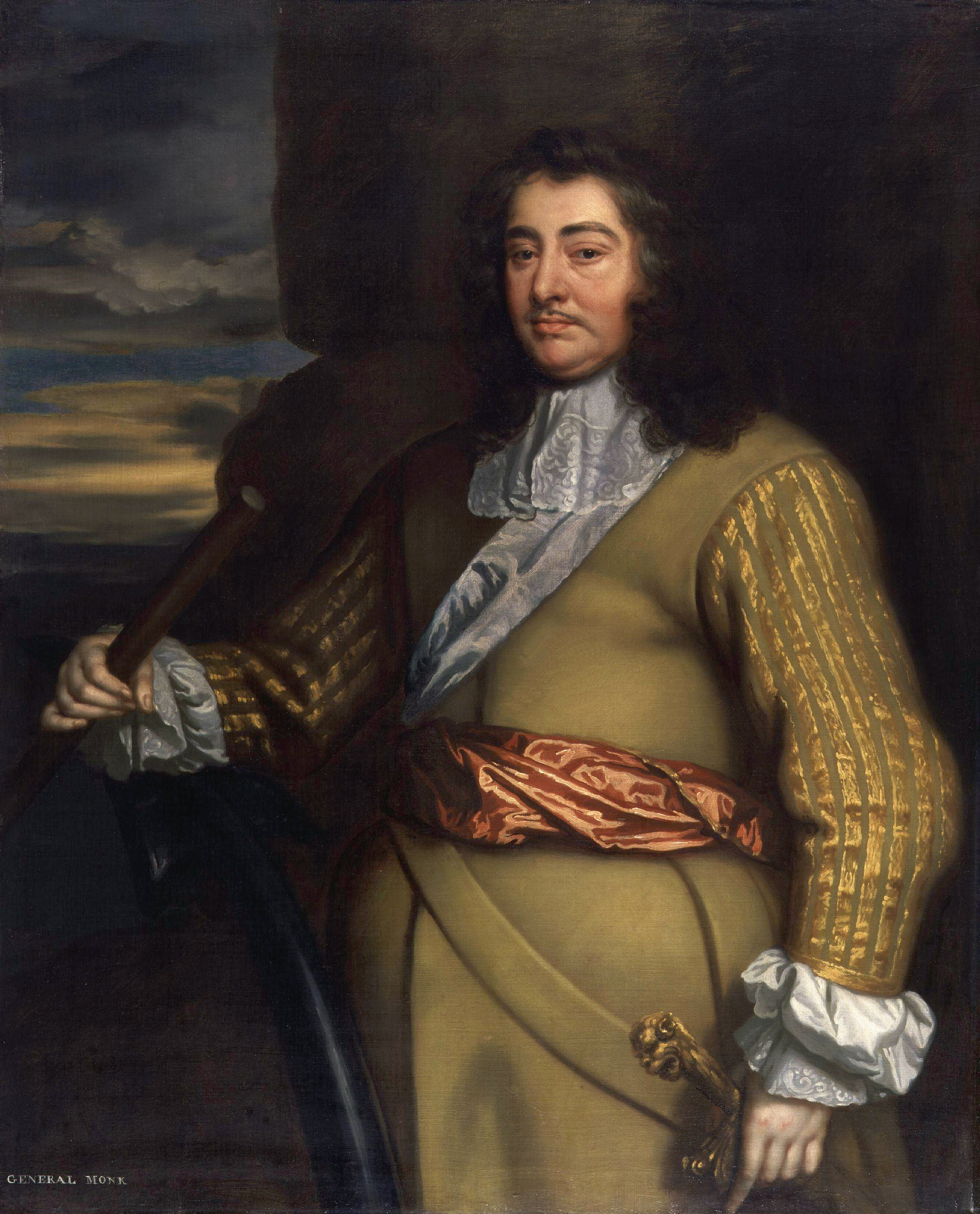
Portrait of George Monck, 1st Duke of Albemarle by Sir Peter Lely, a typical example of the Flagmen series

The Flagmen of Lowestoft are a collection of thirteen paintings by Sir Peter Lely, painted in the mid-1660s. They were originally part of the Royal Collection, though most were given to Greenwich Hospital in the nineteenth century, and are now in the National Maritime Museum in London. The paintings are of prominent naval officers, most of them of flag rank, who had fought at the Battle of Lowestoft in 1665. Lely at the time was Principal Painter to King Charles II.

== Creation ==
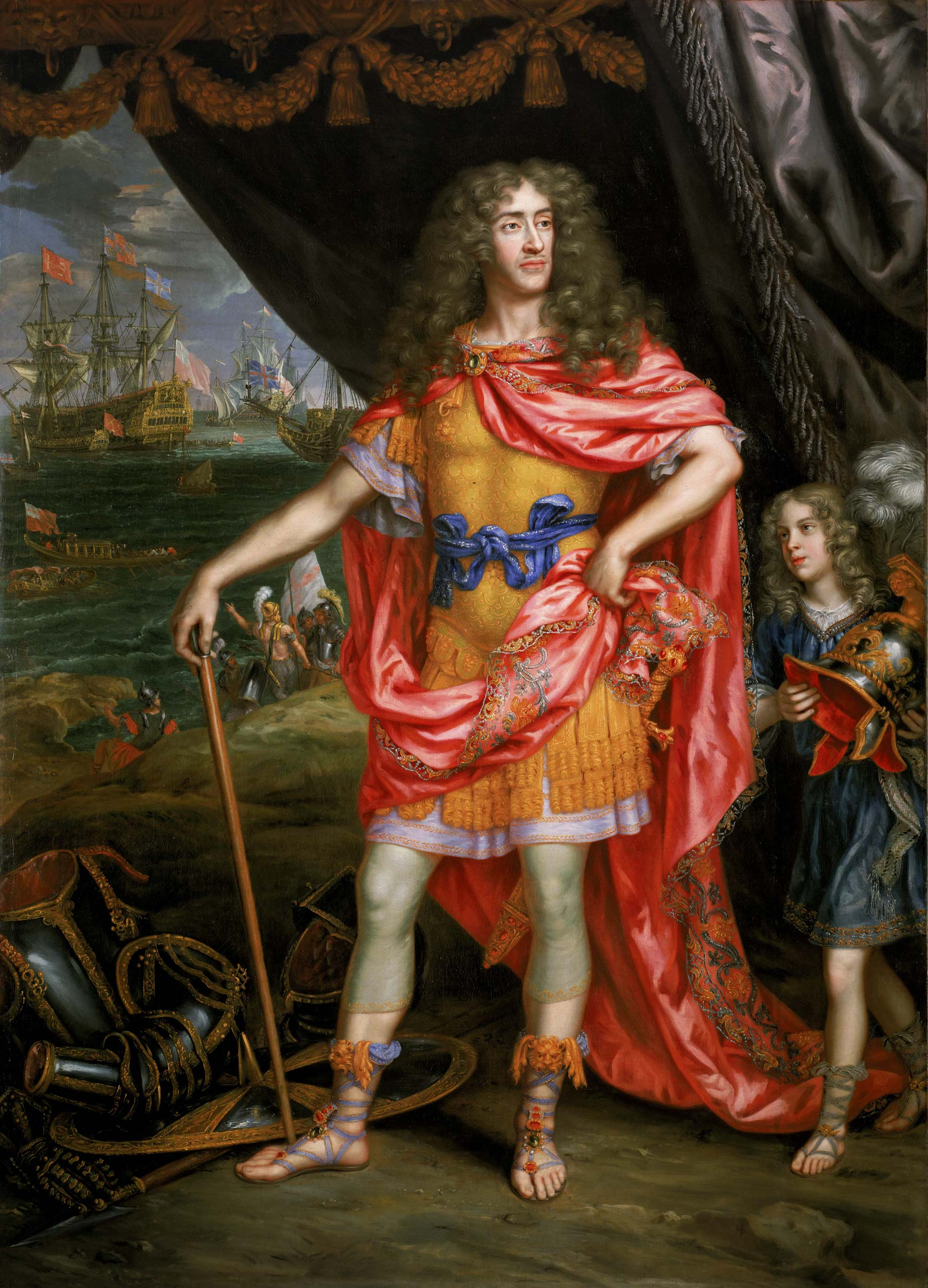
c. 1672–1673 portrait of James, Duke of York by Henri Gascar. James commissioned the series "to hang in his chamber" (in the words of Pepys).

The paintings were commissioned from Lely by James, Duke of York, brother of King Charles II, in late 1665. James had commanded the English fleet against the Dutch at the Battle of Lowestoft on 13 June 1665, and the portraits were intended to commemorate those who had served under him as junior flag officers and captains of some of the ships. Lely, Principal Painter to King Charles II, was working on the series known as the 'Windsor Beauties' at the time for James's wife, Anne Hyde, Duchess of York. The full set consists of thirteen portraits of admirals and senior officers, or 'Flaggmen' as they were known at the time.

Diarist and naval administrator Samuel Pepys visited Lely's studio on 18 April 1666, writing

I to Mr. Lilly's [sic], the painter; and there saw the heads, some finished and all begun, of the Flaggmen in the late great fight with the Duke of Yorke against the Dutch. The Duke of Yorke hath them done to hang in his chamber, and very finely they are done indeed.

He noted that work had begun on all but three portraits, those of the Earl of Sandwich, Sir Jeremiah Smith and Sir William Penn, had yet to be started. The absence of Lawson's portrait in Pepys's list may indicate that this was a later addition to the original commission, Lawson having died on 25 June 1665 of a wound he received in the battle. Since Lawson was already dead and the portrait had not been begun by 1666, it was possibly a posthumous addition to the set. To create unity and emphasise the portraits as being part of a group, Lely painted them in an identical format, all three-quarter length, and on canvases measuring roughly 50 inches (130 cm) by 40 inches (100 cm).

== Appraisal ==
Art historian Ellis Waterhouse assessed the series and declared that 'In such works Lely's splendid prose borders upon the poetry of the great masters'. Brandon Henderson wrote

Strength, depth of character, and psychological interest characterize these portraits, in which Lely brings forth honest and direct likenesses, dramatic gestures, serious-mindedness, dignity and pride. Each portrait in the series is remarkably individual, with fresh and varied poses, costume, attributes and experiences.

Lely's series acted as a 'precedent and a paradigm' for Sir Godfrey Kneller's Kit-cat portraits, 42 portraits of members of the Kit-Cat Club, painted between 1697 and 1721, albeit half-length and on a different size of canvas, later known as the Kit-cat.

== Donation ==
Thirteen individual portraits were created for the Royal Collections. In 1824 King George IV donated 31 paintings with naval connections to Greenwich Hospital, in support of the hospital's director, Edward Hawke Locker, who aimed to establish a naval gallery. Eleven of the flagmen portraits were included in the donation. The exceptions were the portraits of Admiral Sir John Lawson and Prince Rupert, which were retained in the Royal Collection. A copy of Lawson's portrait was instead presented in lieu of the original. George's successor, King William IV, presented an extended full-length copy of the Prince Rupert portrait to the Hospital in 1835. The portraits are now held by the successor of Greenwich Hospital, the National Maritime Museum.

== Portraits ==
Name	Life	Dimensions	Position	Year	Image
George Monck, 1st Duke of Albemarle	(1608–1670)	127 x 101.5 cm	Deputy Lord High Admiral to James, Duke of York	1665–66	
Sir Thomas Allin, 1st Baronet	(1612–1685)	127 x 101.5 cm	Vice-Admiral in the centre division of the red squadron	1665	
Sir George Ayscue	(c. 1615–1672)	127 x 101.5 cm	Vice-Admiral in the rear division of the blue squadron	1665–66	
Sir William Berkeley	(1639–1666)	127 x 101.5 cm	Rear-Admiral in the rear division of the red squadron	1665–66	
Sir John Harman	(d. 1673)	127 x 101.5 cm	Flag captain to James, Duke of York aboard HMS Royal Charles	1666	
Sir Joseph Jordan	(1603/4–1685)	127 x 101.5 cm	Rear-Admiral in the van division of the red squadron	1666	
Sir John Lawson	(c.1615–1665)	127 x 101.5 cm	Vice-Admiral in the van division of the red squadron		
Sir Christopher Myngs	(c.1625–1666)	127 x 101.5 cm	Vice-Admiral in the van division of the white squadron	1665–66	
Sir William Penn	(1621–1670)	127 x 101.5 cm	Captain of the Fleet to James, Duke of York aboard HMS Royal Charles	1665–66	
Prince Rupert of the Rhine	(1619–1682)	127 x 101.5 cm^{[a]}	Admiral of the White squadron	1665–66	
Edward Montagu, 1st Earl of Sandwich	(1625–1672)	127 x 101.5 cm	Admiral of the Blue squadron	1666	
Sir Jeremiah Smith	(d. 1675)	127 x 101.5 cm	Commander of HMS Mary in the centre division of the red squadron	1666	
Sir Thomas Teddeman	(c.1620–1668)	127 x 101.5 cm	Rear-Admiral in the rear division of the blue squadron	1666	

== Notes ==
a. The dimensions and details are for Lely's original portrait, still held in the Royal Collection. The image is however the full-length copy presented to Greenwich Hospital.
