= Peter Lely =

Dutch painter (1618–1680)

Sir Peter Lely
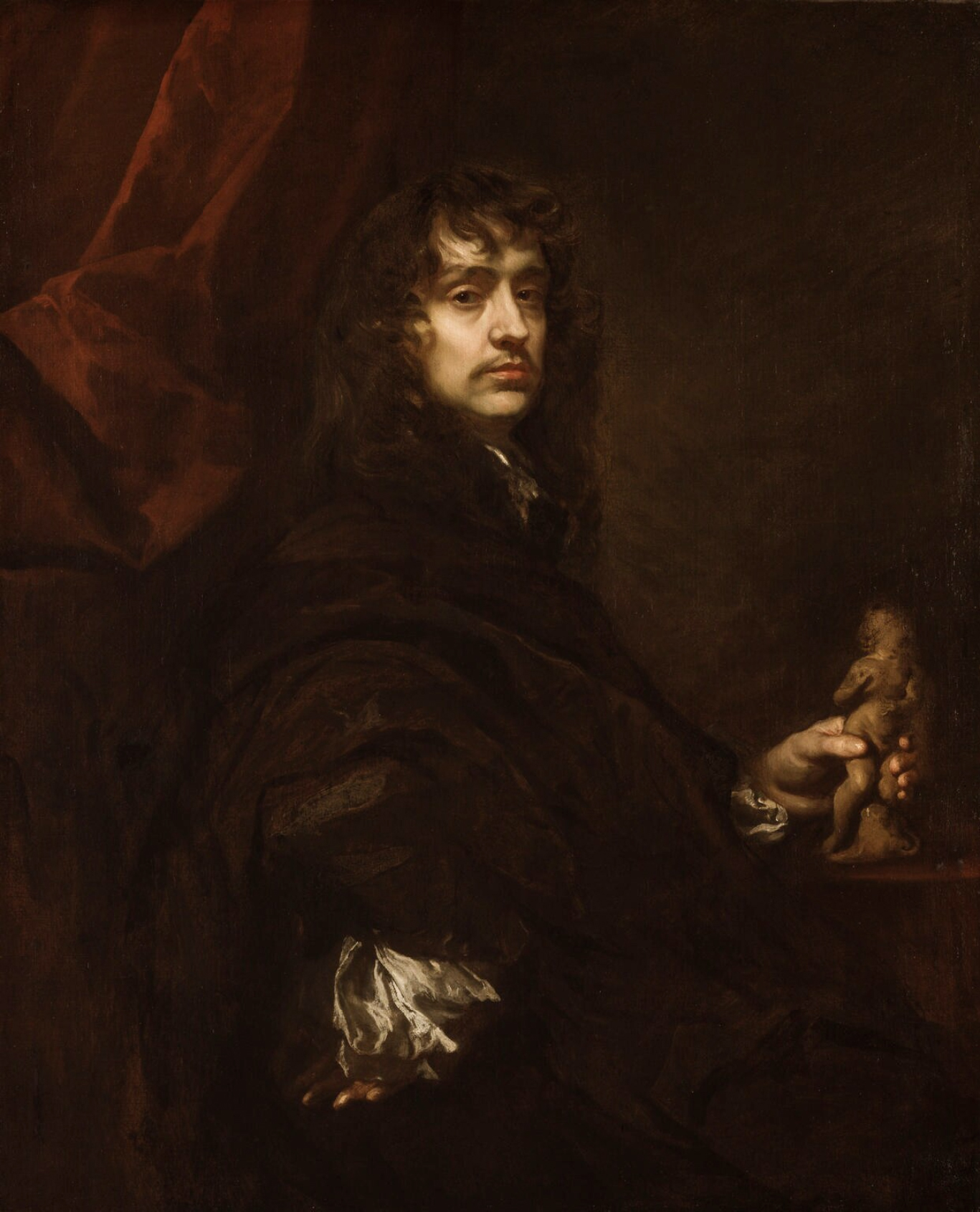
- Self-portrait, c. 1660
- Born: Pieter van der Faes; 14 September 1618; Soest, Duchy of Cleves, Holy Roman Empire
- Died: 30 November 1680 (aged 62); Covent Garden, England
- Known for: Painting

Sir Peter Lely (Dutch: [ˈliːlɪ]; 14 September 1618 – 30 November 1680) was a painter of Dutch origin whose career was nearly all spent in England, where he became the dominant portrait painter to the court. He became a naturalised English subject and was knighted in 1680 by King Charles II.

== Life ==
Lely was born Pieter van der Faes on 14 September 1618 to Dutch parents in Soest in Westphalia, where his father was an officer serving in the armed forces of the Elector of Brandenburg. He studied painting in Haarlem, where he may have been apprenticed to Pieter de Grebber. He became a master of the Guild of Saint Luke in Haarlem in 1637. He is reputed to have adopted the surname "Lely" (also occasionally spelled Lilly) from a heraldic lily on the gable of the house where his father was born in The Hague.

He arrived in London in around 1643, His early English paintings, mainly mythological or religious scenes, or portraits set in a pastoral landscape, show influences from Anthony van Dyck and the Dutch baroque. Lely's portraits were well received, and he succeeded Anthony van Dyck (who had died in 1641) as the most fashionable portrait artist in England. He became a freeman of the Painter-Stainers' Company in 1647 and was a portrait artist to Charles I. His talent ensured that his career was not interrupted by Charles's execution, and he served Oliver Cromwell, whom he painted "warts and all", and Richard Cromwell. In the years around 1650 the poet Sir Richard Lovelace wrote two poems about Lely, "Peinture" and "See! What a clouded majesty! ..."

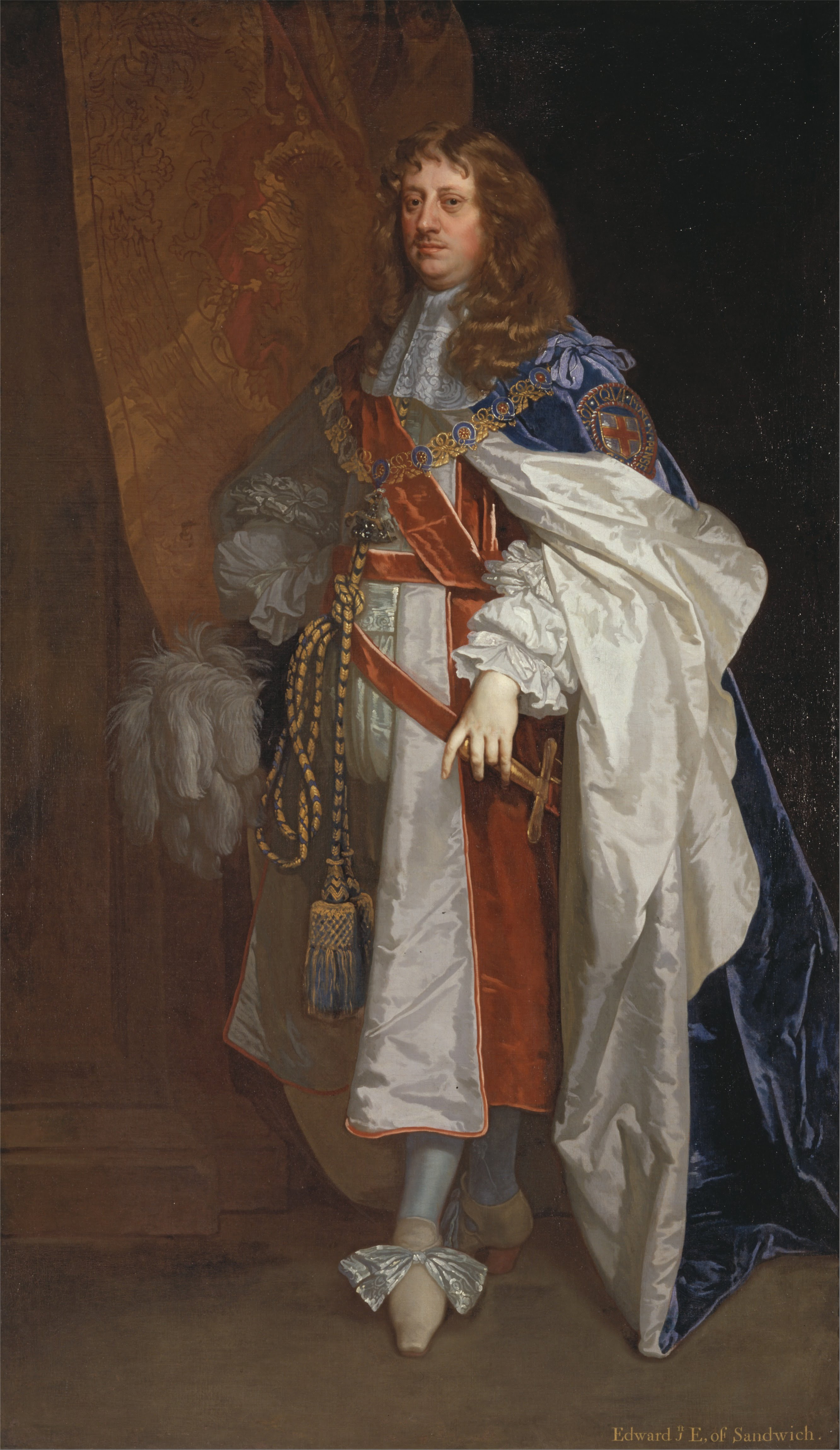
Peter Lely – Edward Montagu, 1st Earl of Sandwich

After the English Restoration in 1660, Lely was appointed as Charles II's Principal Painter in Ordinary in 1661, with a stipend of £200 per year, as van Dyck had enjoyed in the previous Stuart reign. Lely became a naturalised English subject in 1662. The young Robert Hooke came to London to follow an apprenticeship with Lely before being given a place at Westminster School by Richard Busby. Lely was knighted in 1680.

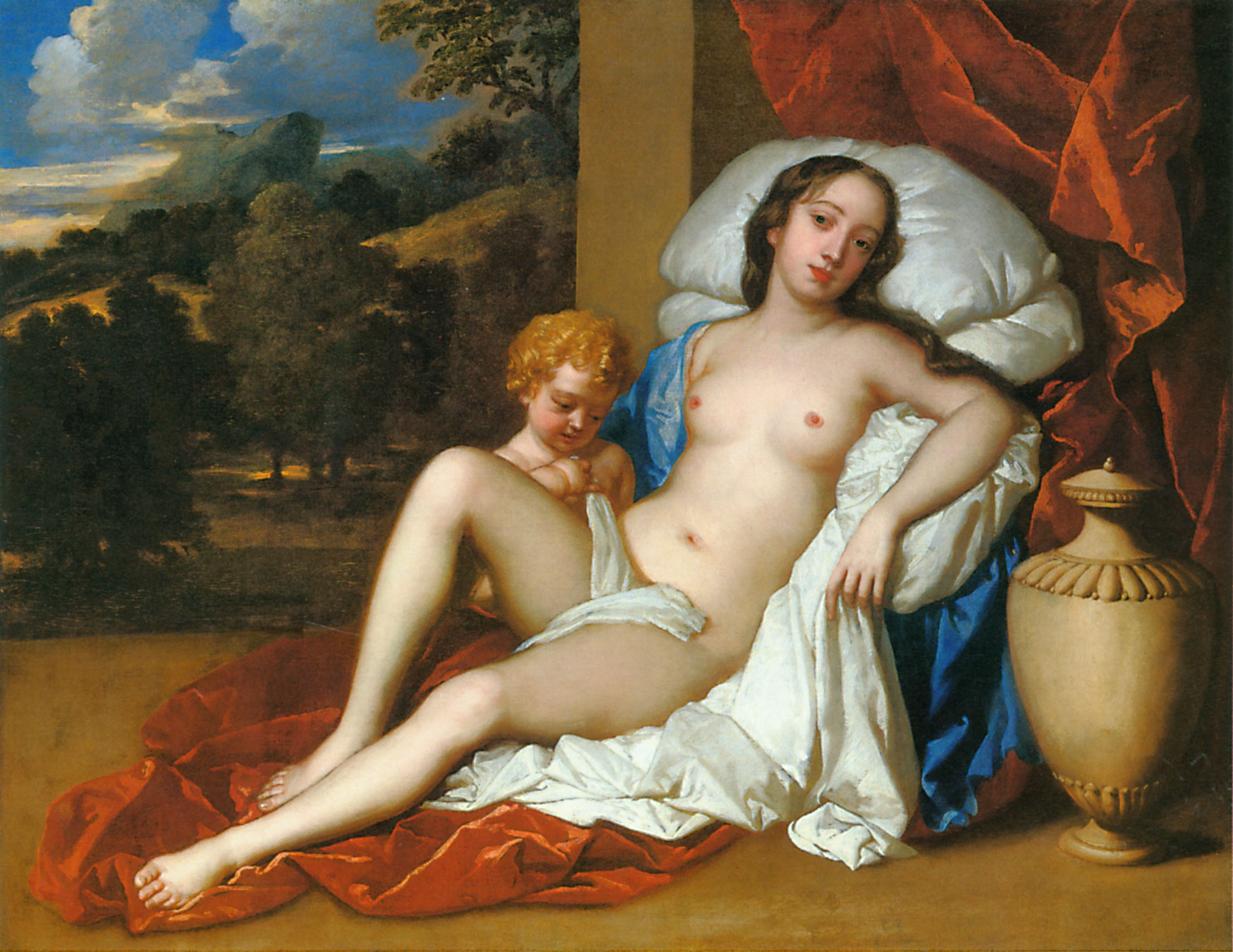
Long-time mistress of Charles II of England, Nell Gwynne as Venus, with her son, Charles Beauclerk, as Cupid.

Demand was high, and Lely and his large workshop were prolific.

After Lely painted a sitter's head, his pupils would often complete the portrait in one of a series of numbered poses. As a result, he is the first English painter who has left "an enormous mass of work", although the quality of studio pieces is variable. As Brian Sewell put it:

There may well be thousands of these portraits, ranging from rare prime originals of often quite astonishing quality, to crass workshop replicas by assistants drilled to imitate Lely's way with the fashionable face and repeat the stock patterns of the dress, landscapes, flowers, musical instruments and other essential embellishments of portraiture. On Lely's death in 1680 his executors employed a dozen such slaves to complete for sale the many unfinished canvases stacked about his studio. It is these half-and-half and hardly-at-all Lelys that line the corridors of the indigent aristocracy whose houses are now administered by the National Trust, and no sight is more aesthetically and intellectually numbing, unless it is a corridor of Knellers.

Among his most famous paintings are a series of 10 portraits of ladies from the Royal court, known as the Windsor Beauties, formerly at Windsor Castle but now at Hampton Court Palace; a similar series for Althorp; a series of 12 of the admirals and captains who fought in the Second Anglo-Dutch War, known as the "Flagmen of Lowestoft", now mostly owned by the National Maritime Museum in Greenwich; and his Susannah and the Elders at Burghley House.

His most famous non-portrait work is probably Nymphs by a Fountain in Dulwich Picture Gallery.

Lely played a significant role in introducing the mezzotint to Britain, as he realized its possibilities for publicising his portraits. He encouraged Dutch mezzotinters to come to Britain to copy his work, laying the foundations for the English mezzotint tradition.

Lely lived from about 1651 to 1680 at No. 10–11 Great Piazza, Covent Garden. He was knighted in 1679. Lely died on 30 November 1680 at his easel in Covent Garden, while painting a portrait of the Duchess of Somerset; it is believed he likely died after a stroke. Sir Peter was buried at St Paul's Church, Covent Garden on 7 December 1680, and his funerary inscription is now lost.

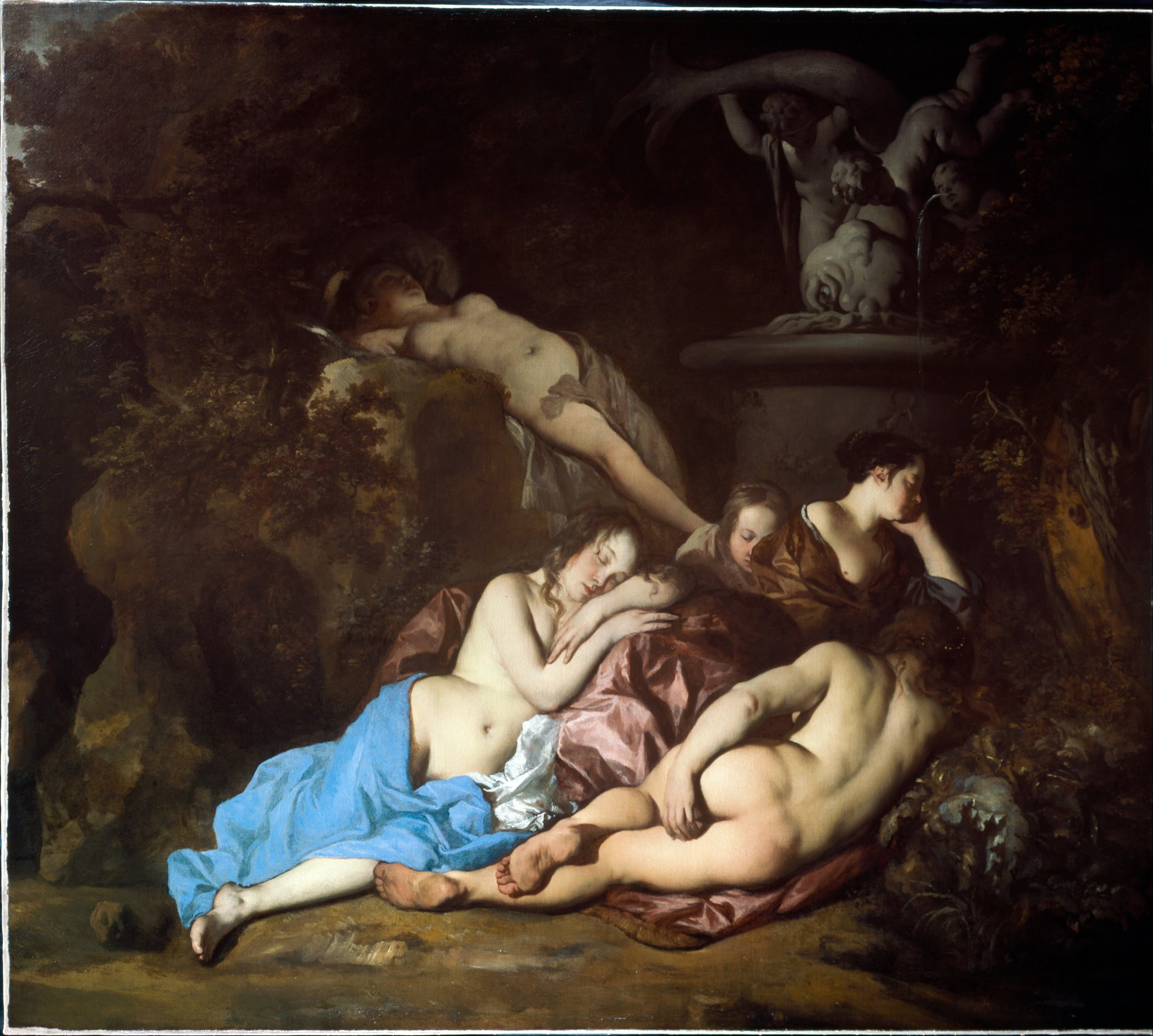
Nymphs by a Fountain, an atypical mythological work

== Legacy ==
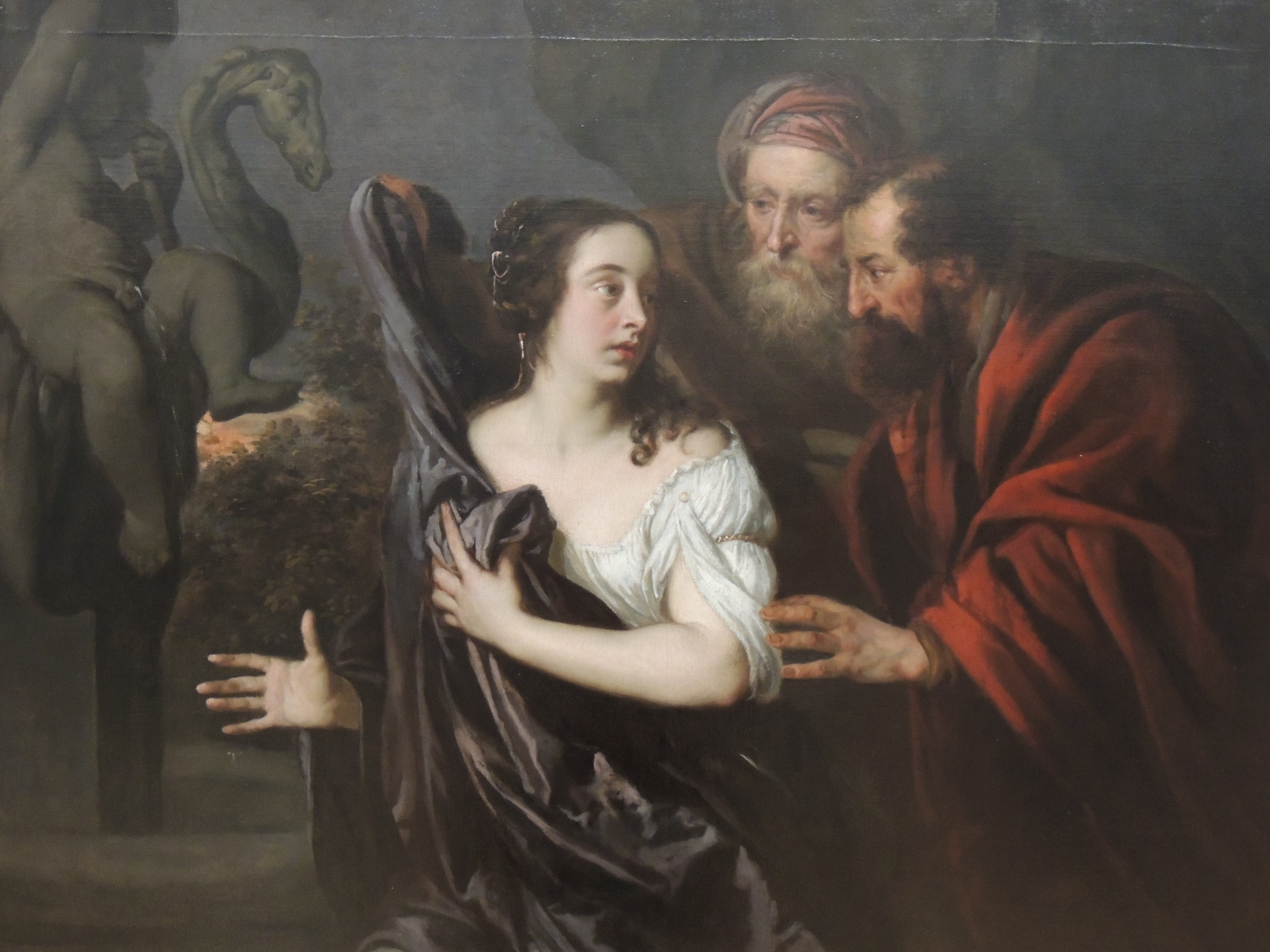
Susanna and the Elders, 1650–5.

In his lifetime, Lely was known as a skillful connoisseur of art. His collection of Old Masters, including Veronese, Titian, Claude Lorrain and Rubens, and a fabulous collection of drawings, was broken up and sold after his death, raising the immense sum of £26,000. Some items in it which had been acquired by Lely from the Commonwealth dispersal of Charles I's art collections, such as the Lely Venus, were re-acquired by the Royal Collection.

He was replaced as court portraitist jointly by John Riley and Sir Godfrey Kneller, also a German-born Dutchman, whose style drew from Lely's but reflected later Continental trends.

A horse was also named after him, finishing fourth in the 1996 Grand National.

== Style ==
Lely was first and foremost a portraitist. He painted both men and women, but with a greater inclination towards the latter, whose cleavage was often accentuated, sometimes to the point of having one breast fully exposed (such as in Margaret Hughes's earlier portrait, seen below).

The loss in 1929 of a "family portrait by Sir Peter Lely" was reported in the fire at Pit House, Farley Heath, Albury.

== Gallery ==
Peter Lely's works

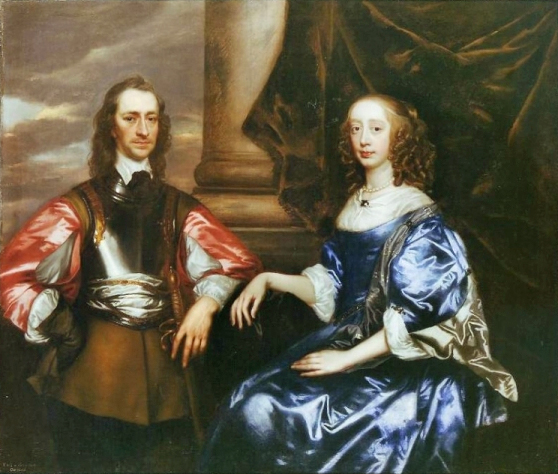
Earl and Countess of Oxford

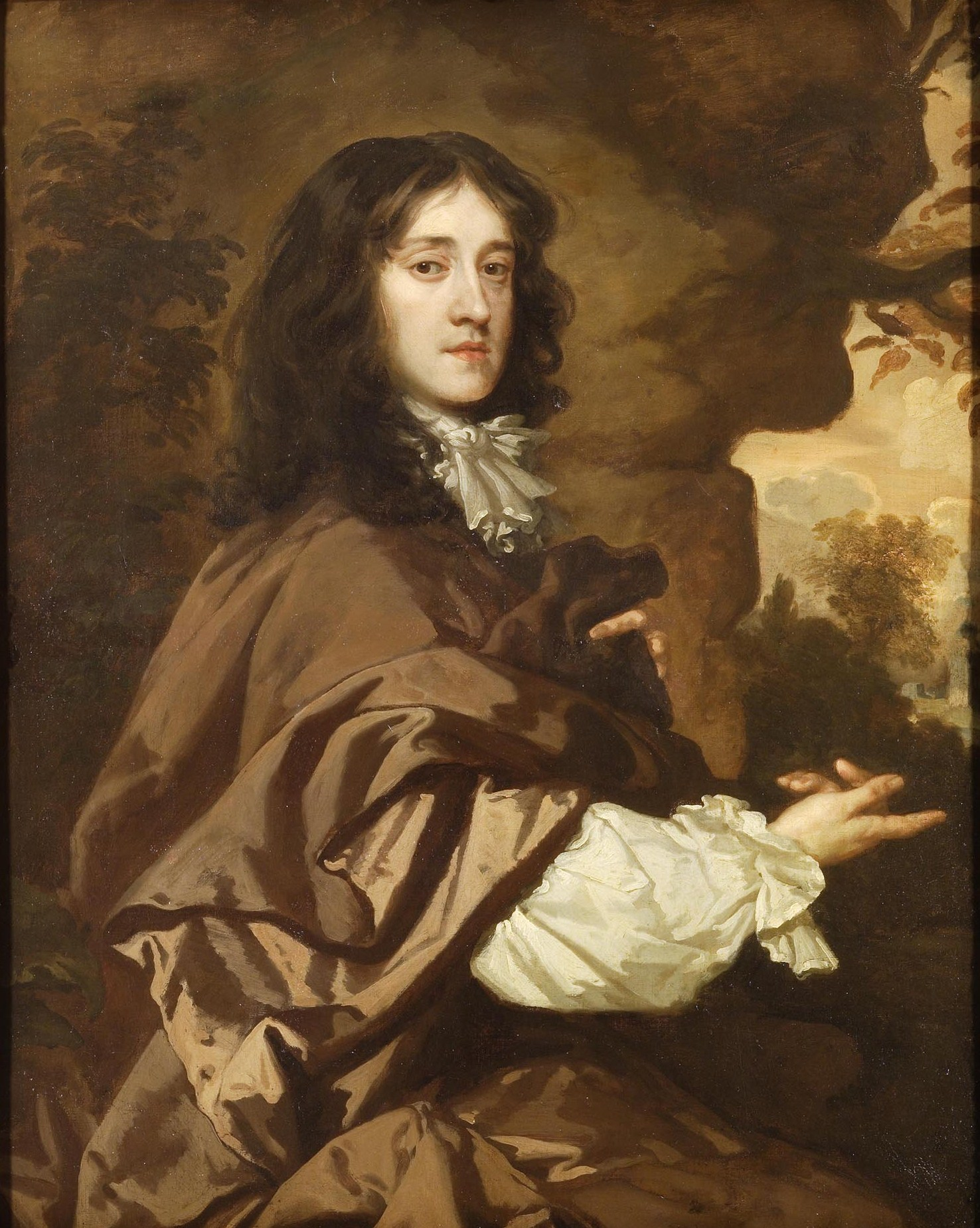
Sir Robert Worsley, 3rd Baronet

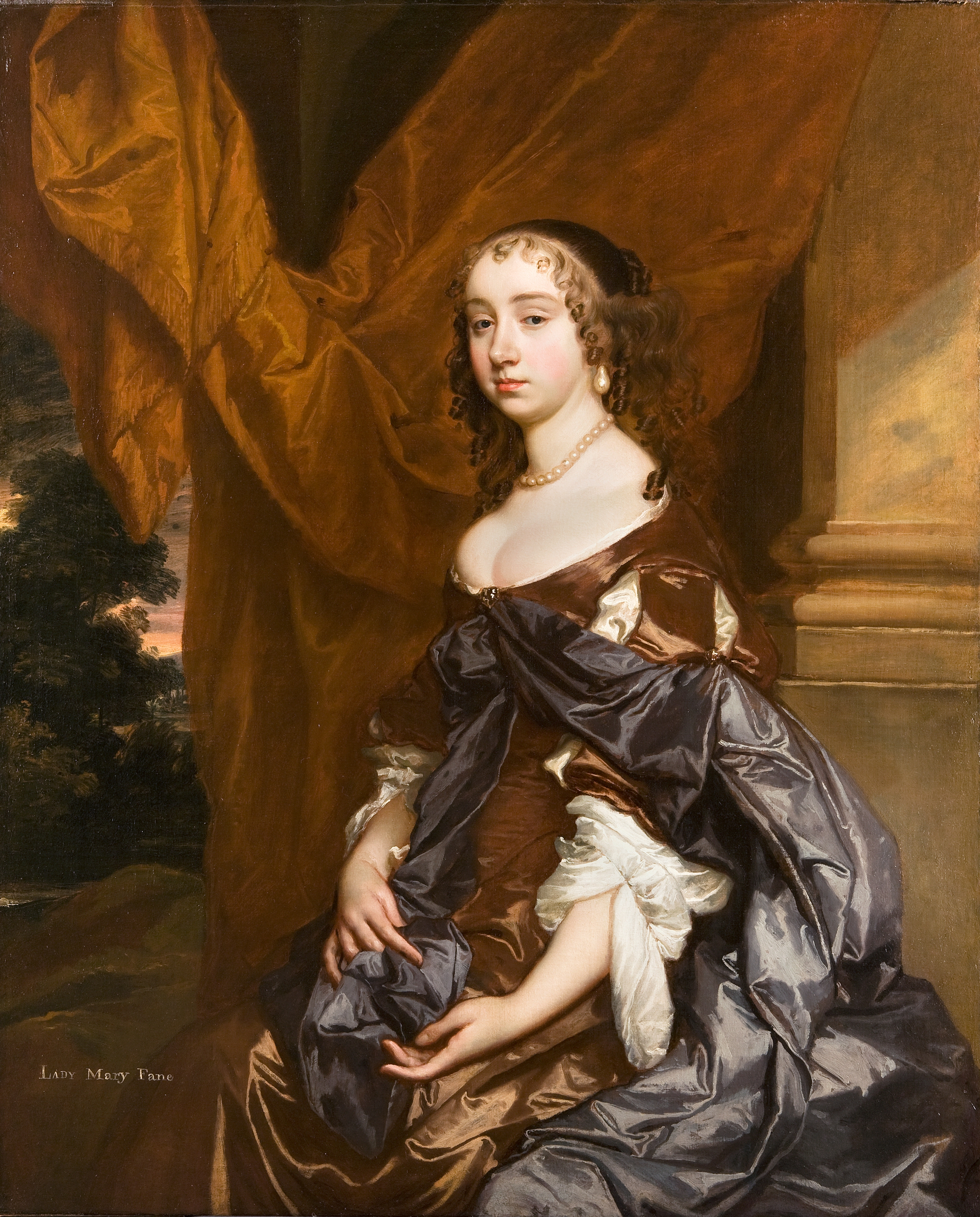
Lady Mary Fane by Sir Peter Lely

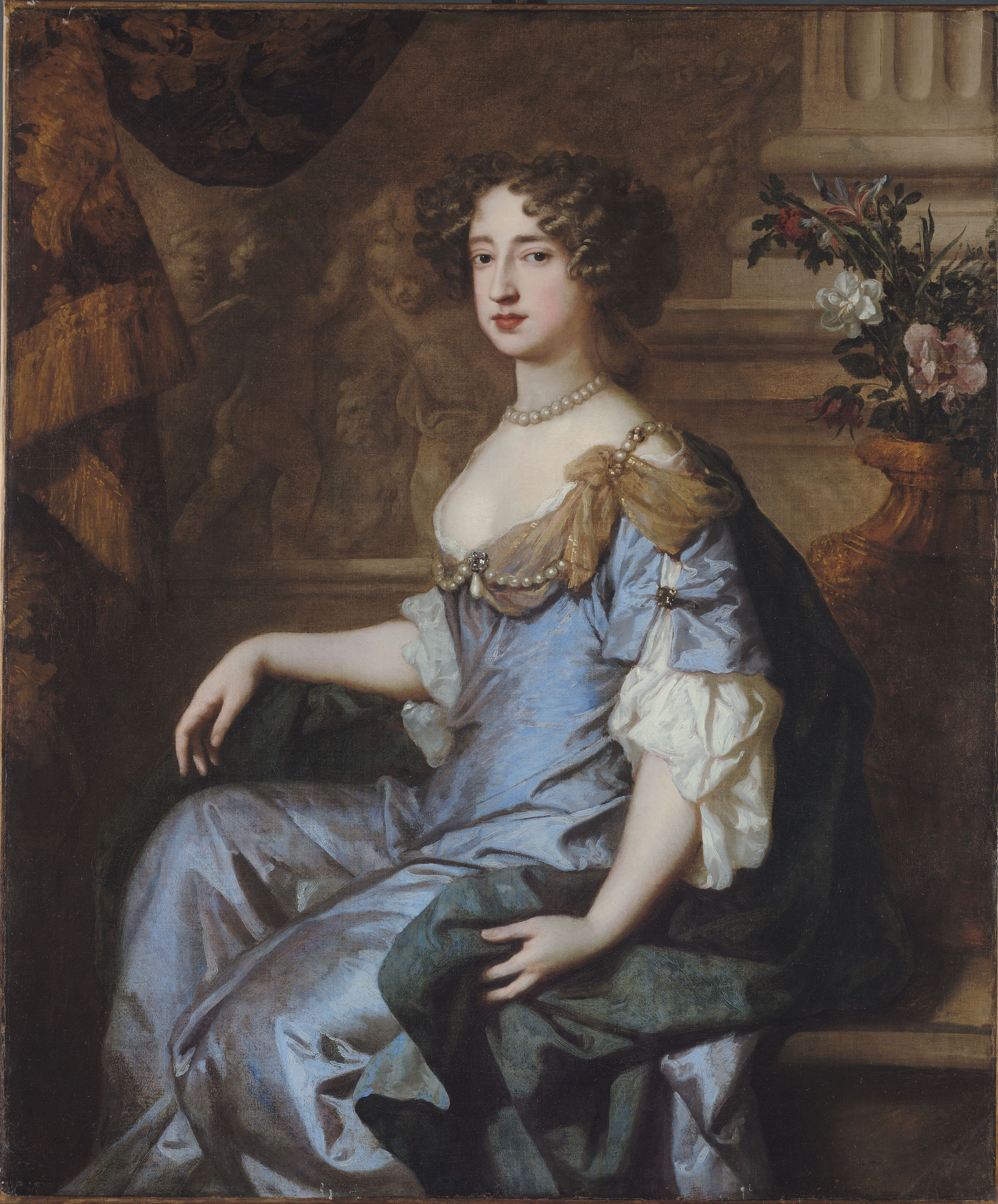
Queen Mary II

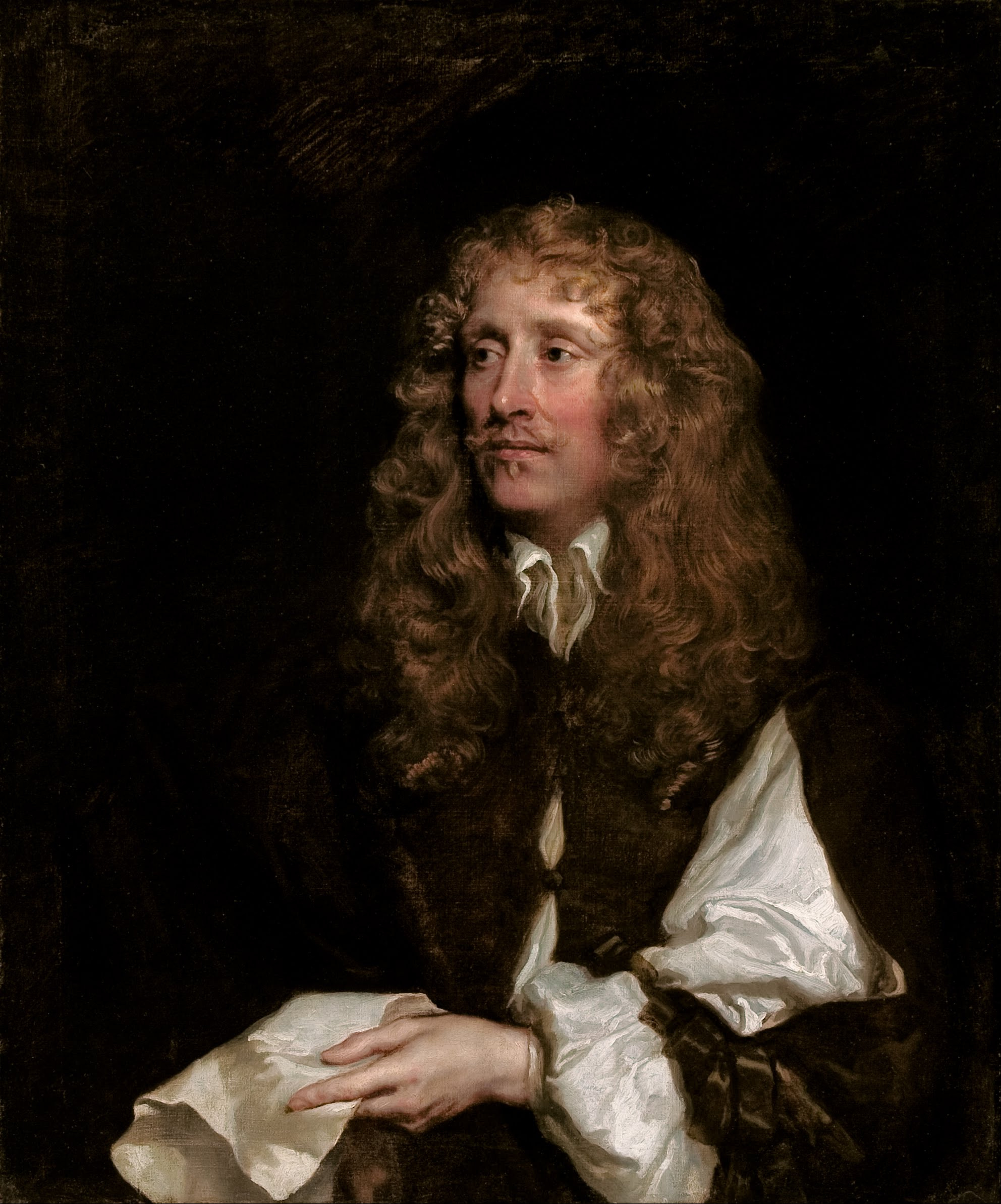
Portrait of a man, thought to be George Booth, Lord Delamere, 1660

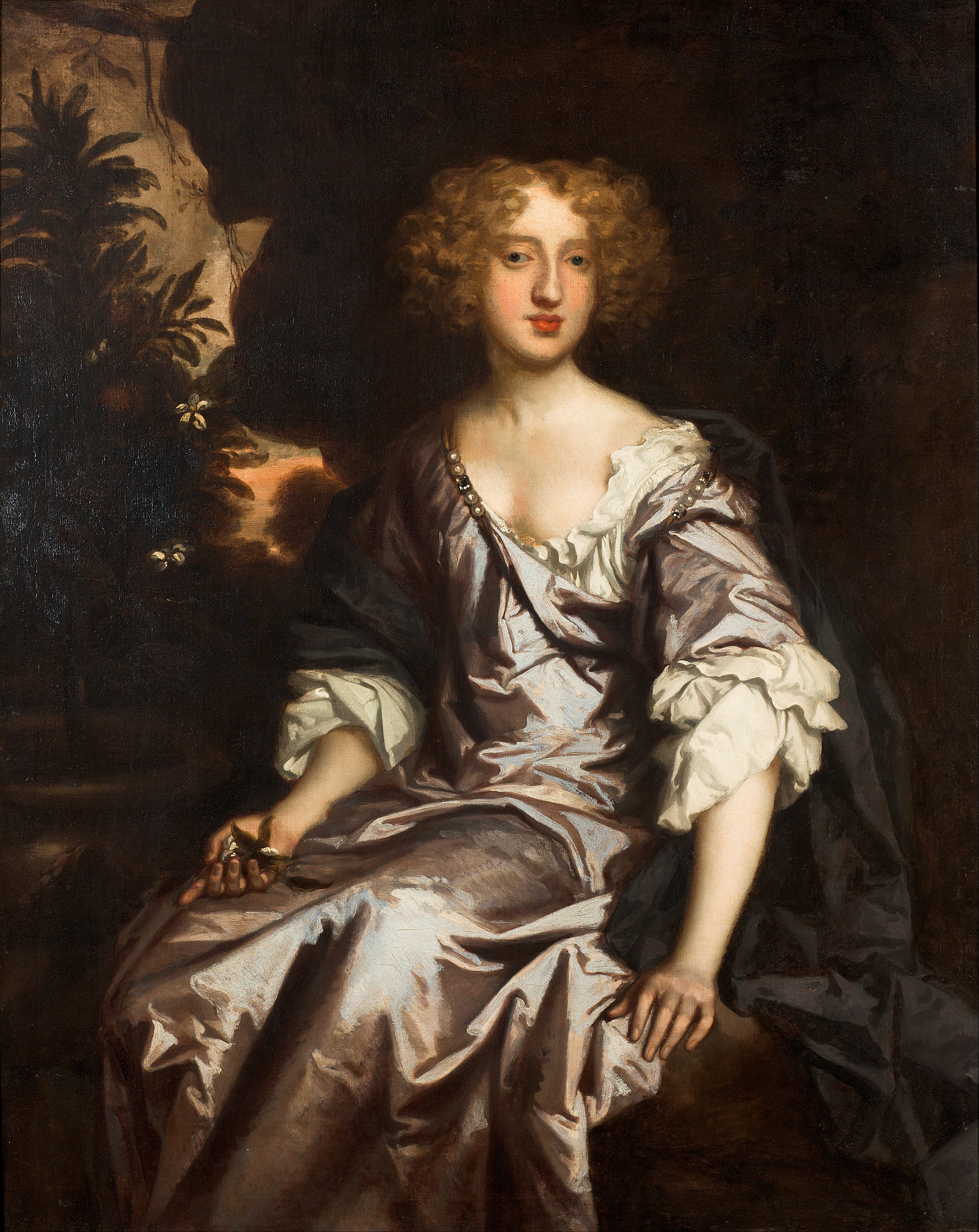
Portrait of Lady Elizabeth Strickland, née Pile

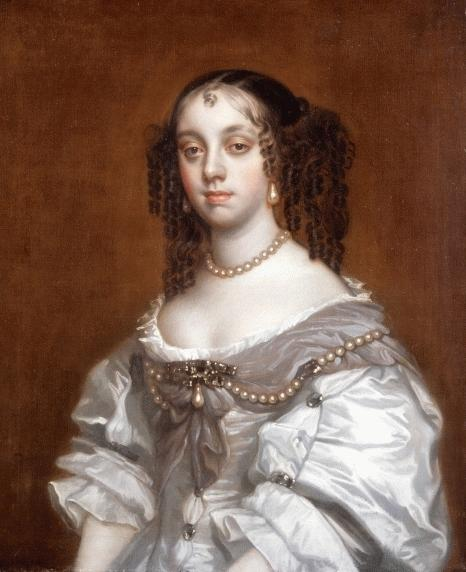
Catherine of Braganza, Queen of England 1665

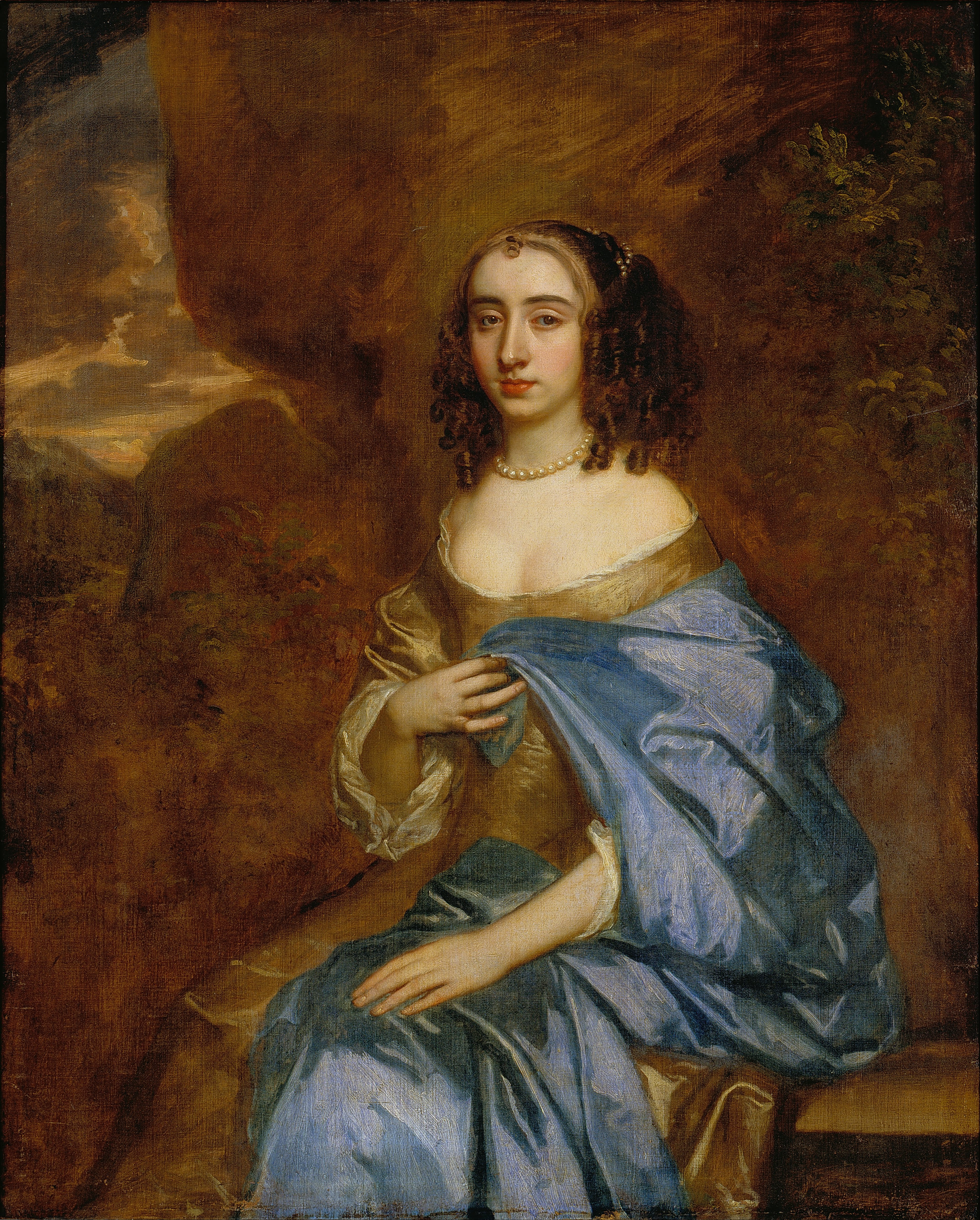
Portrait of a Lady with a Blue Drape, circa 1660

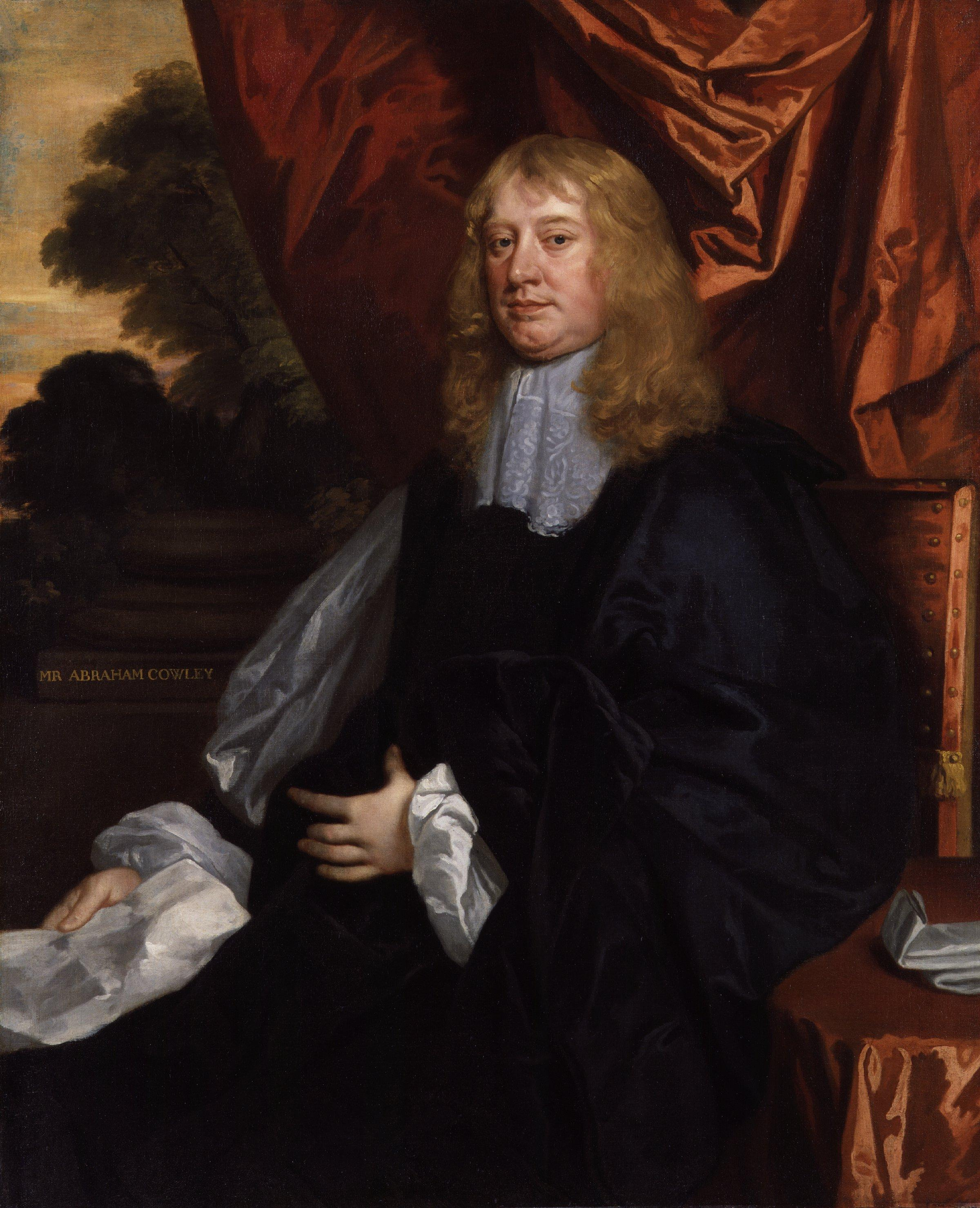
Abraham Cowley, c. 1665–66

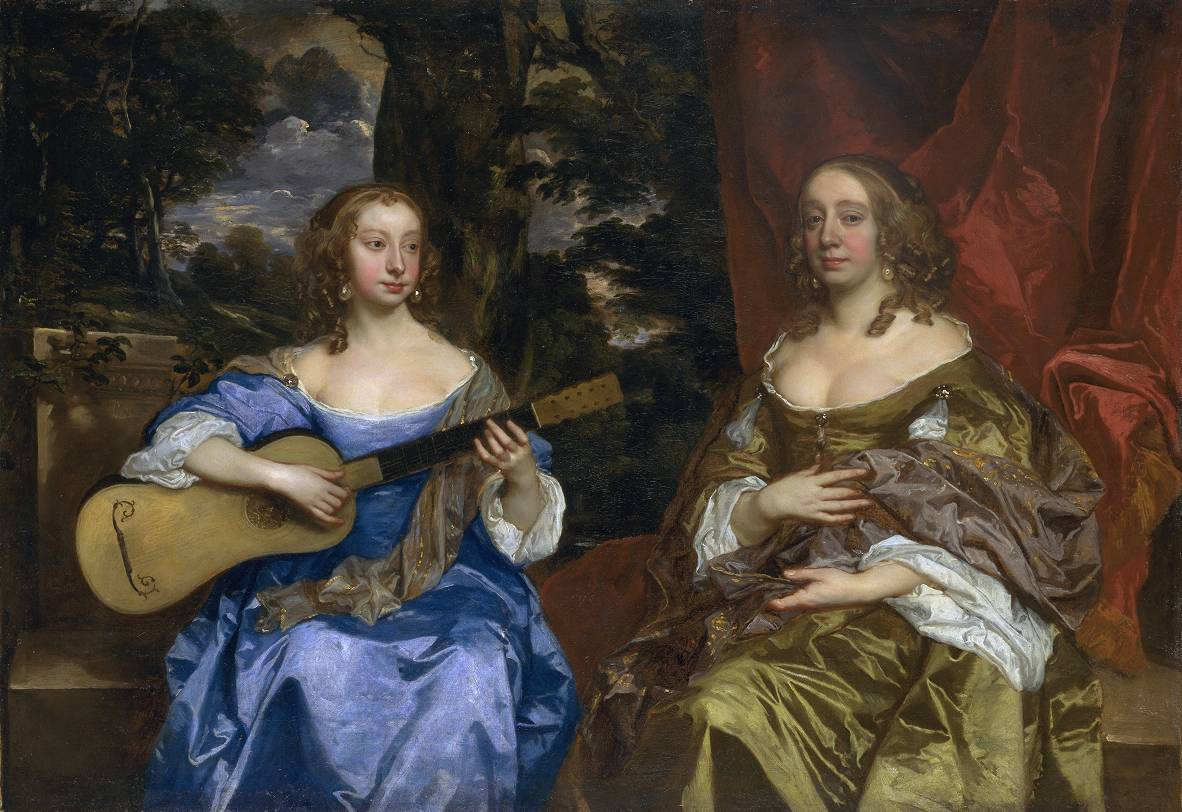
Two ladies from the Lake family, 1650.

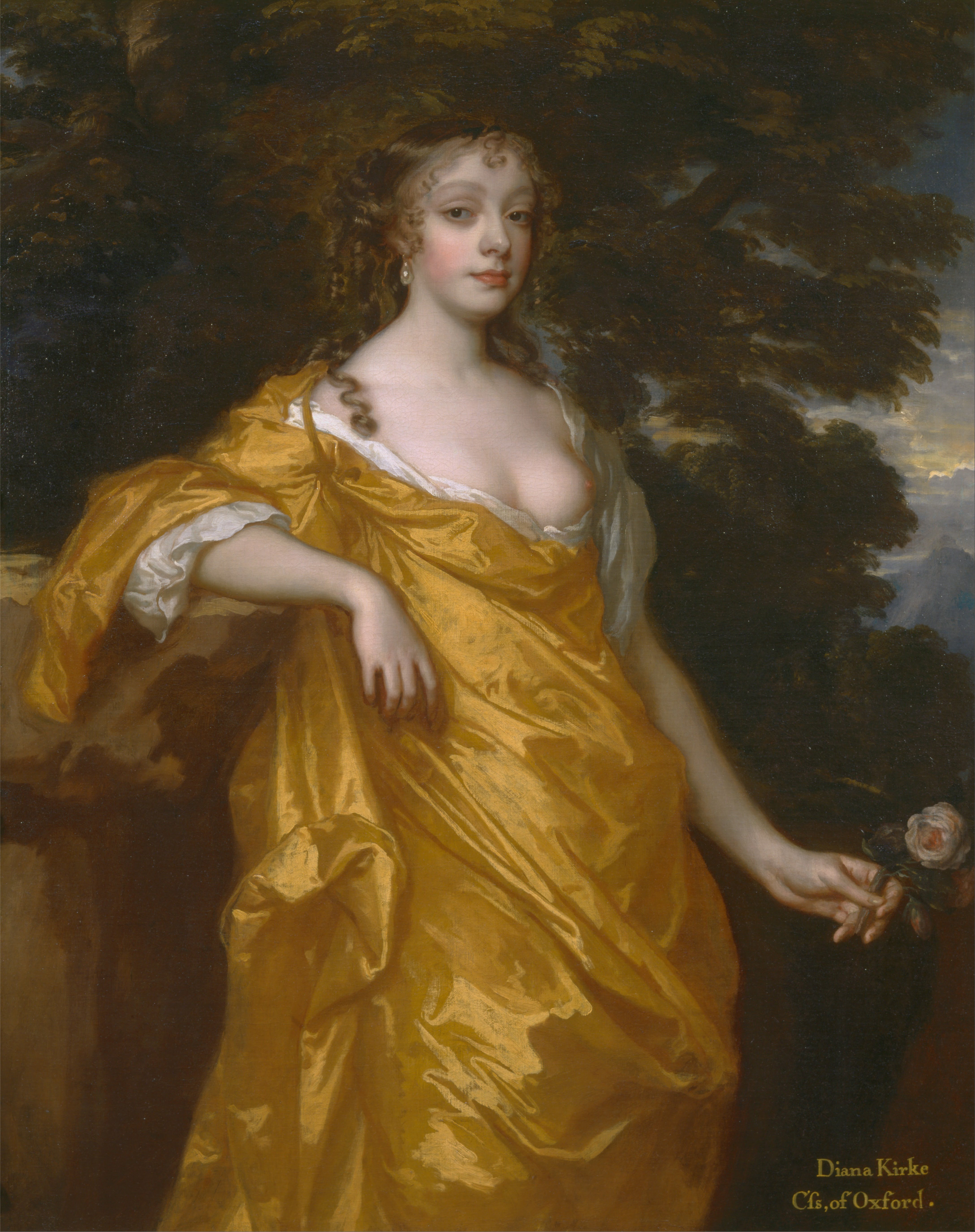
Diana Kirke, later Countess of Oxford, 1665

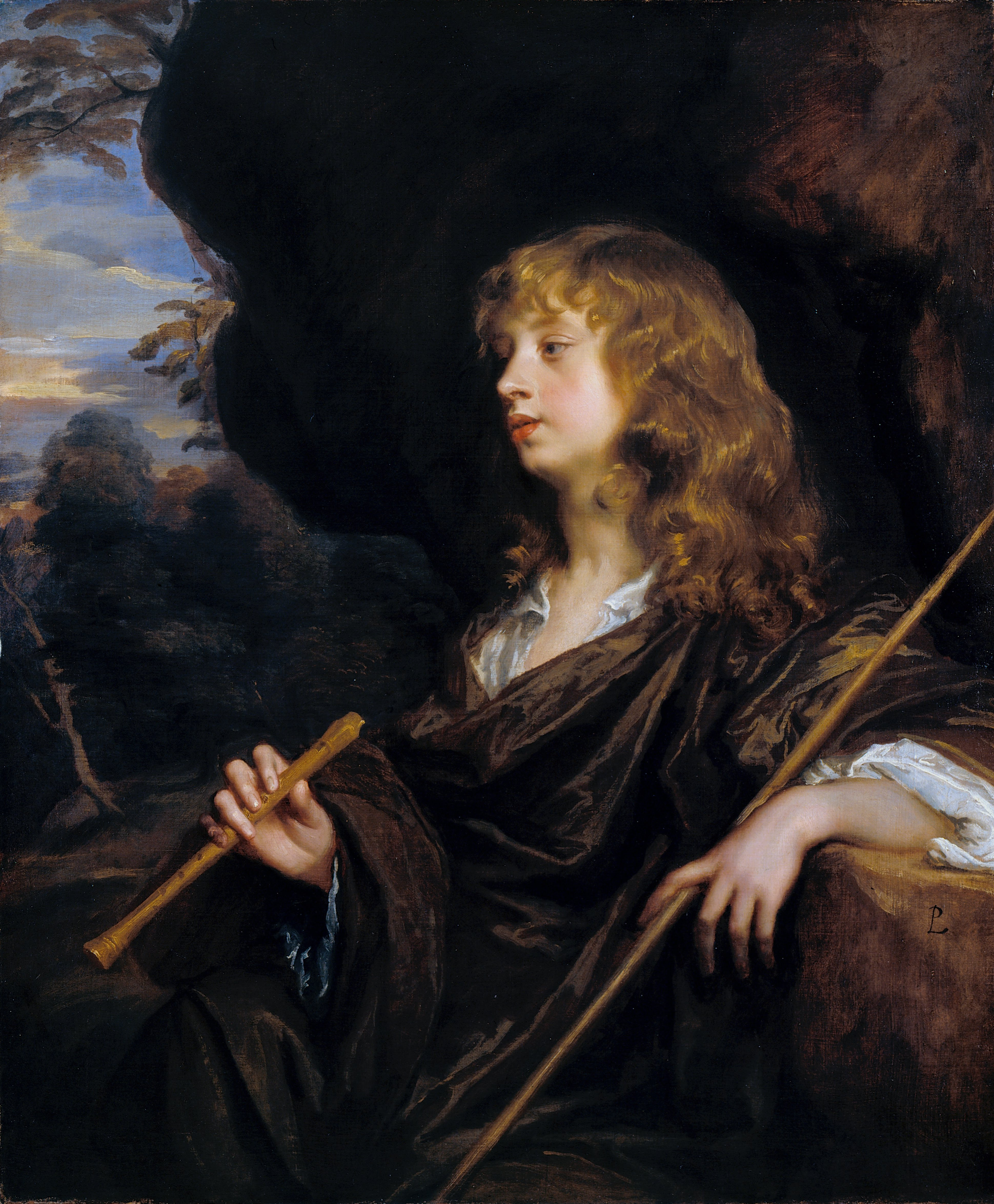
A Boy as a Shepherd

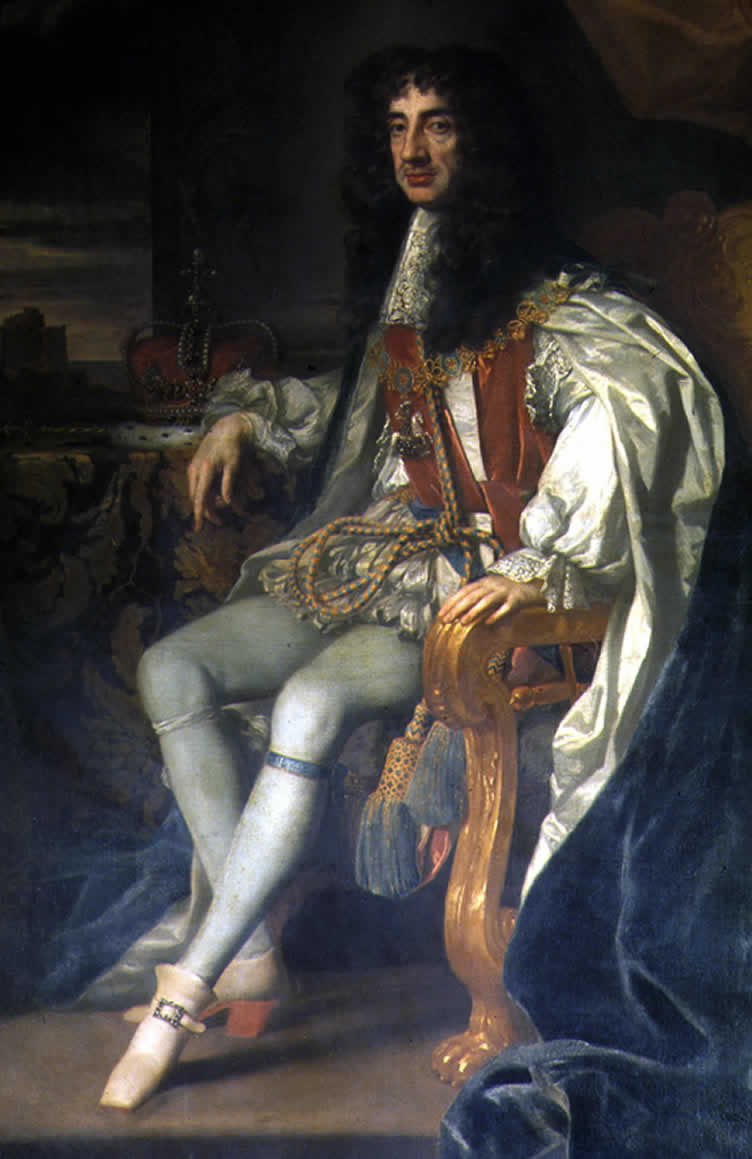
Charles II of England, c. 1675

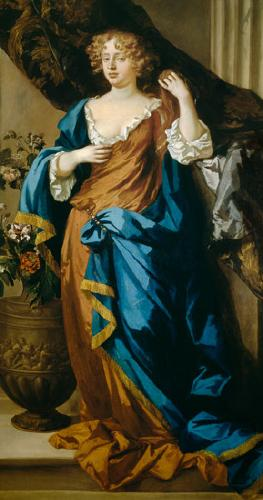
Jane Howard, Duchess of Norfolk

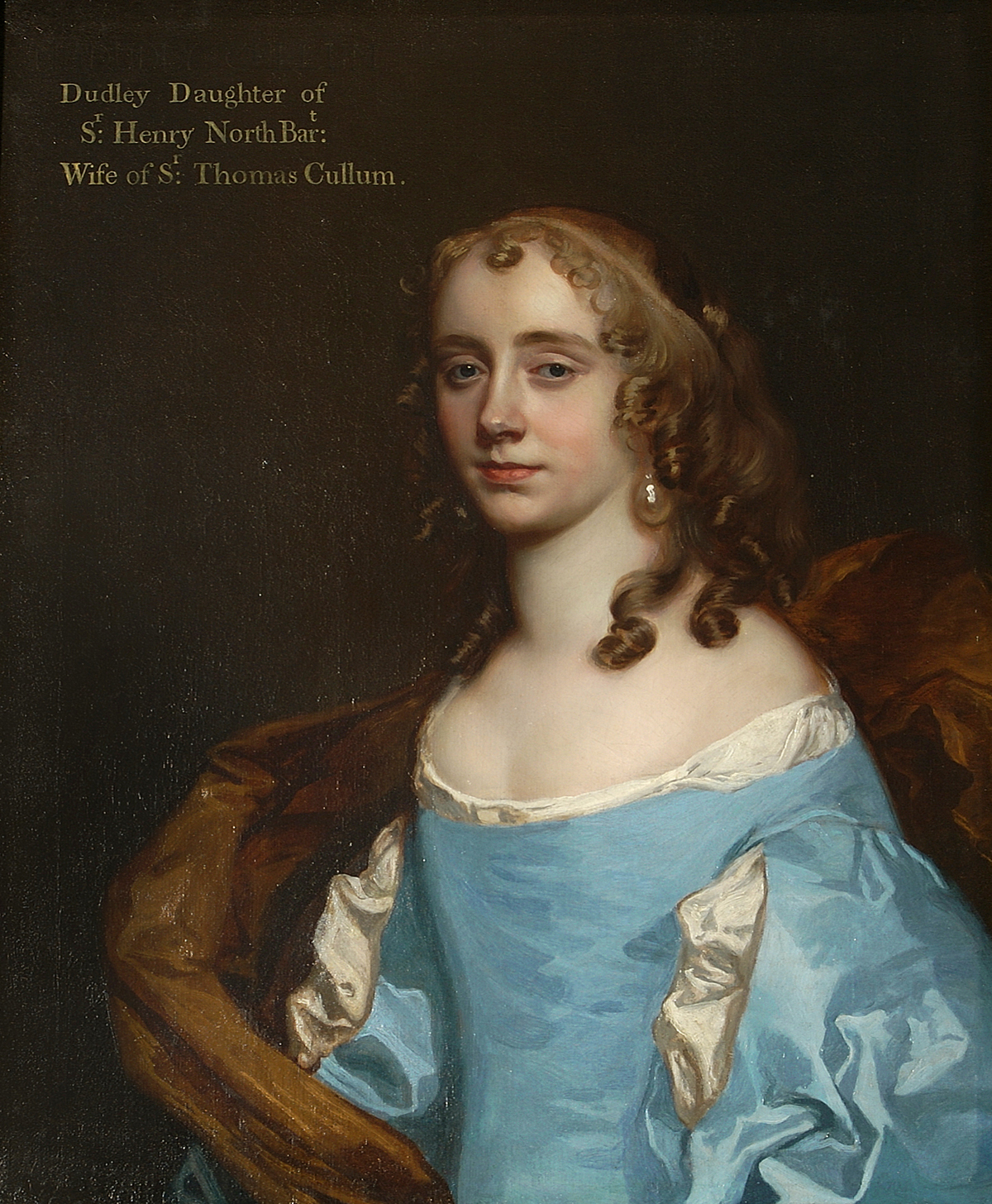
Dudley, Daughter of Sr. Henry North, Bart., Wife of Sir Thomas Cullum

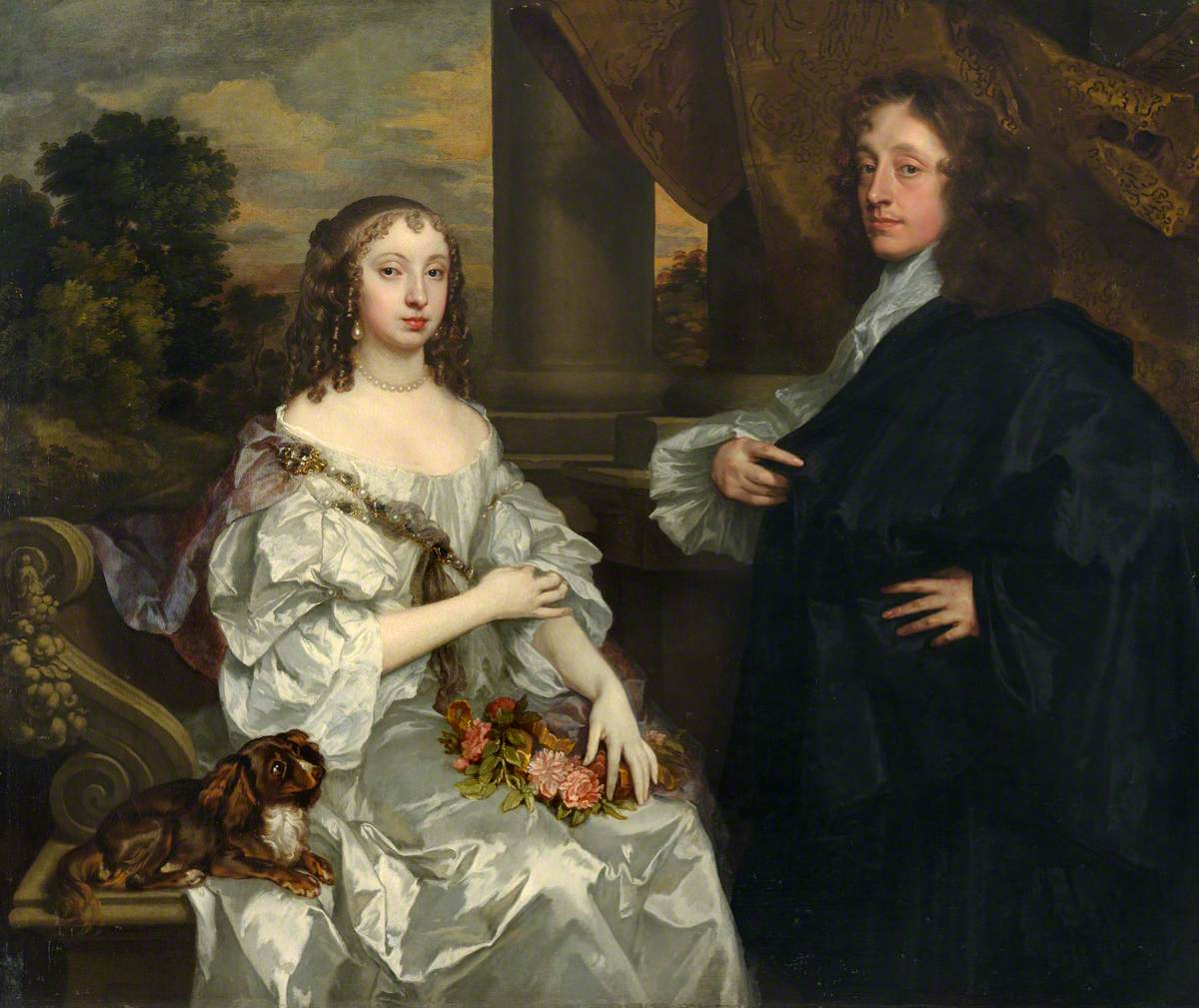
Sir Thomas Fanshawe of Jenkins and his wife Margaret

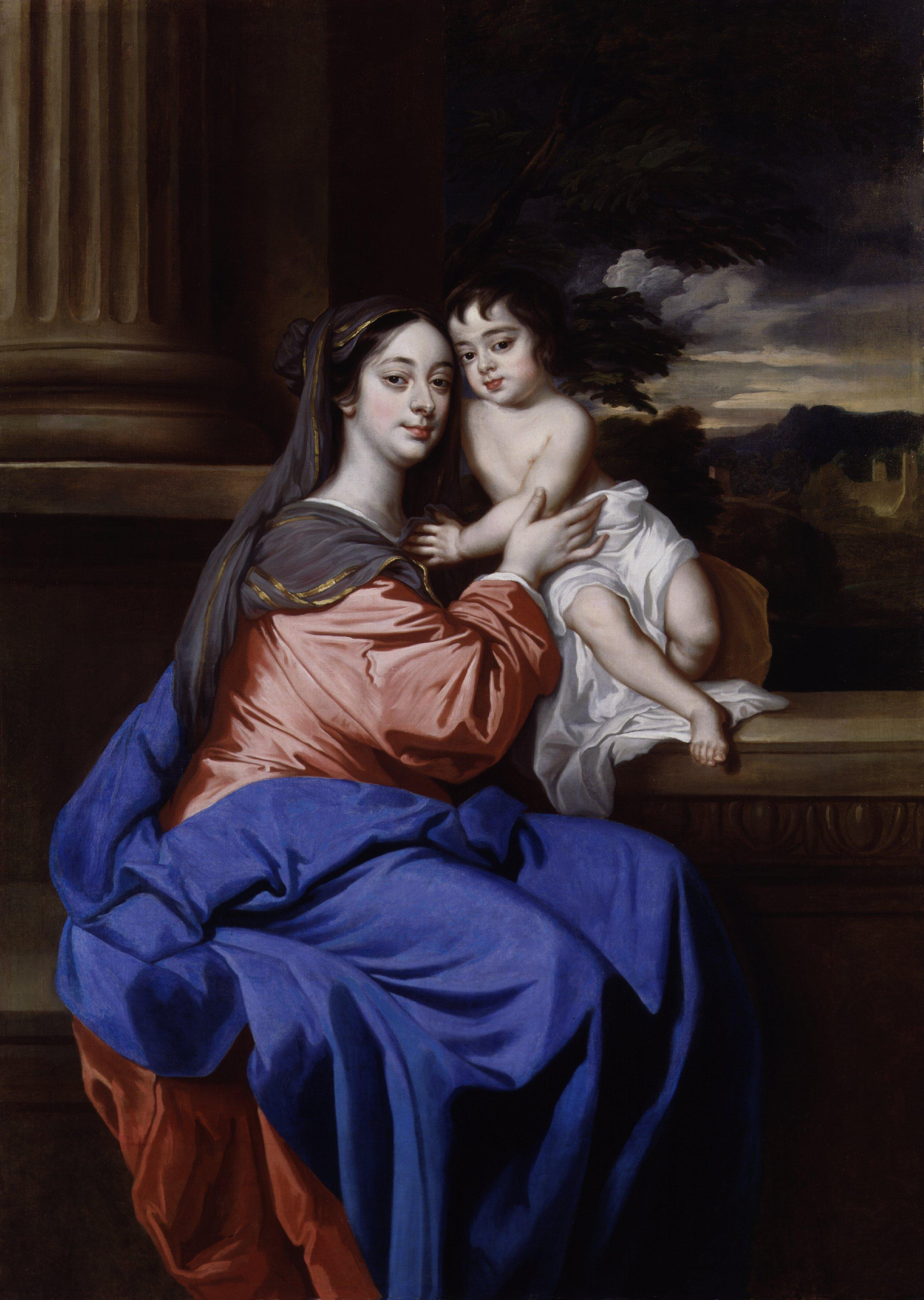
Madonna and Child by Sir Peter Lely

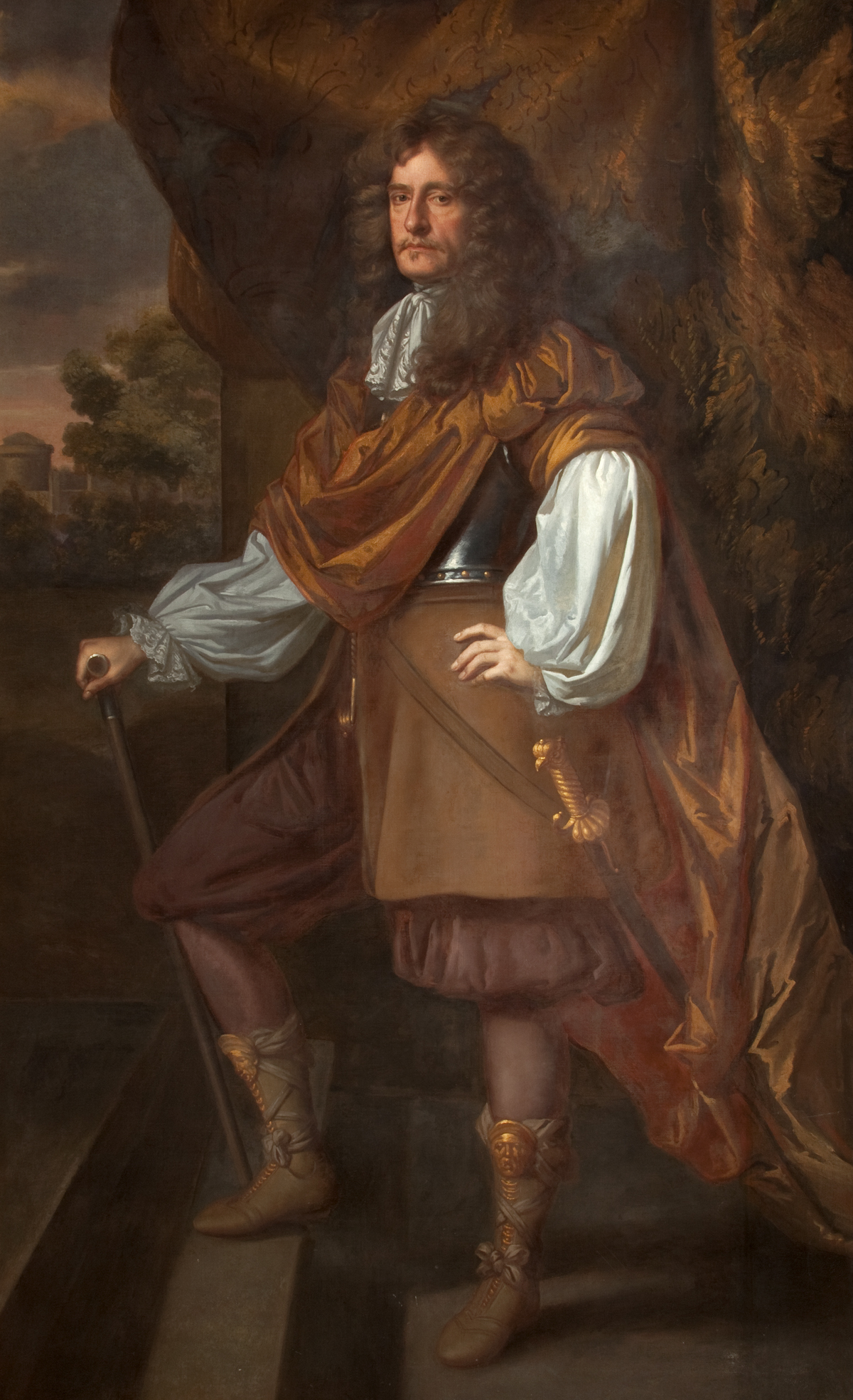
Sir William Ashburnham

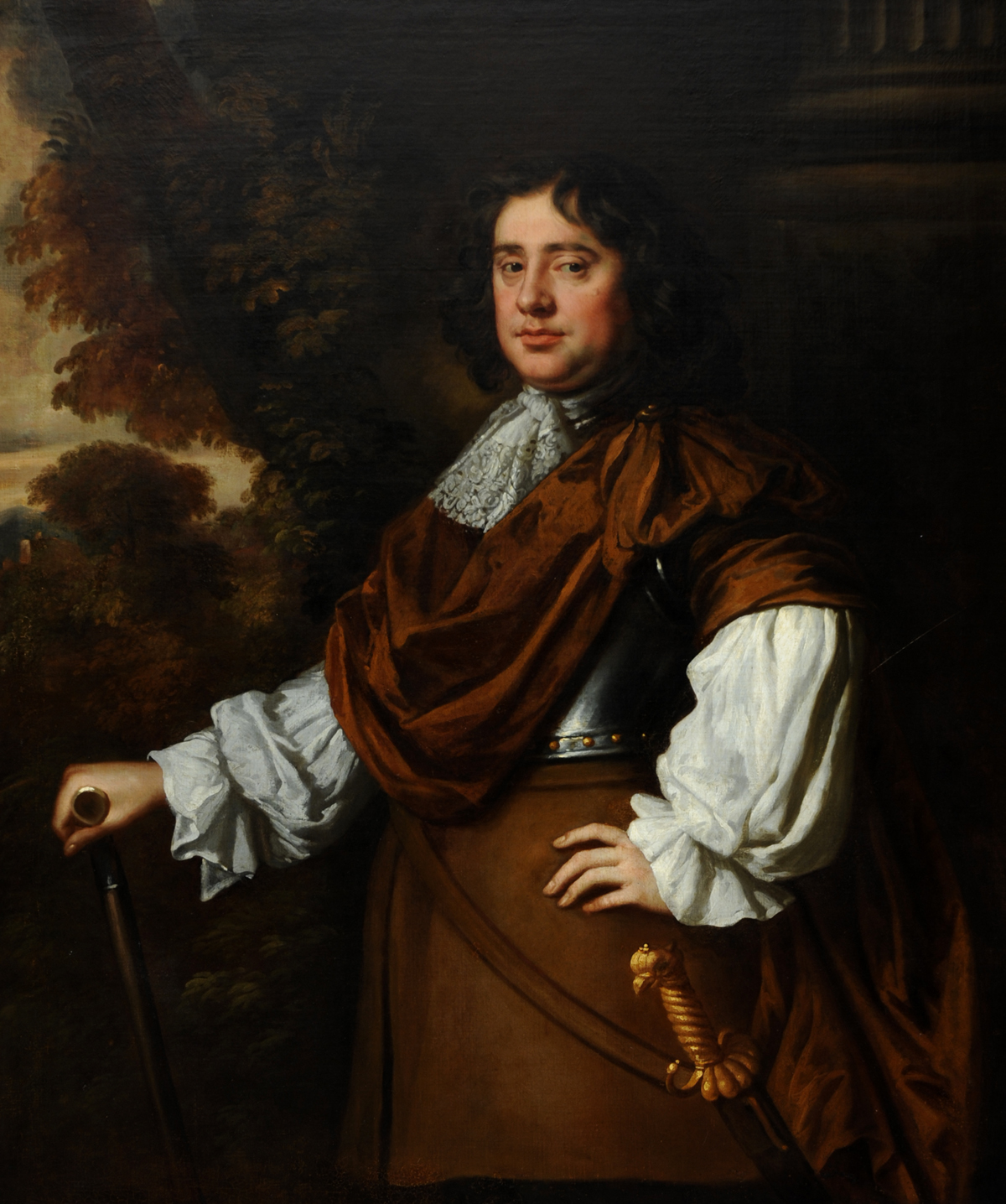
John Graham, 1st Viscount Dundee

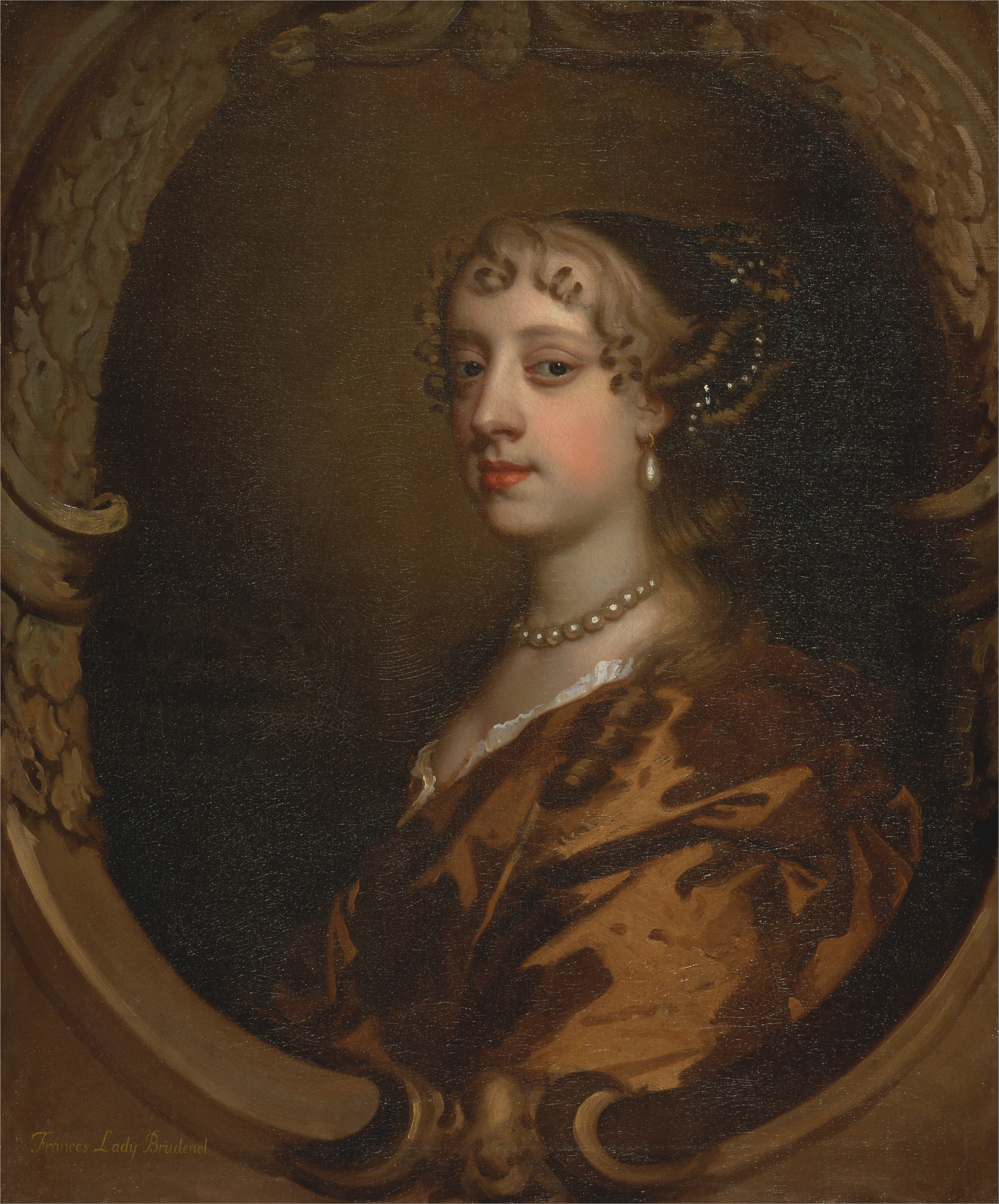
Lady Frances Savile, Later Lady Brudenell

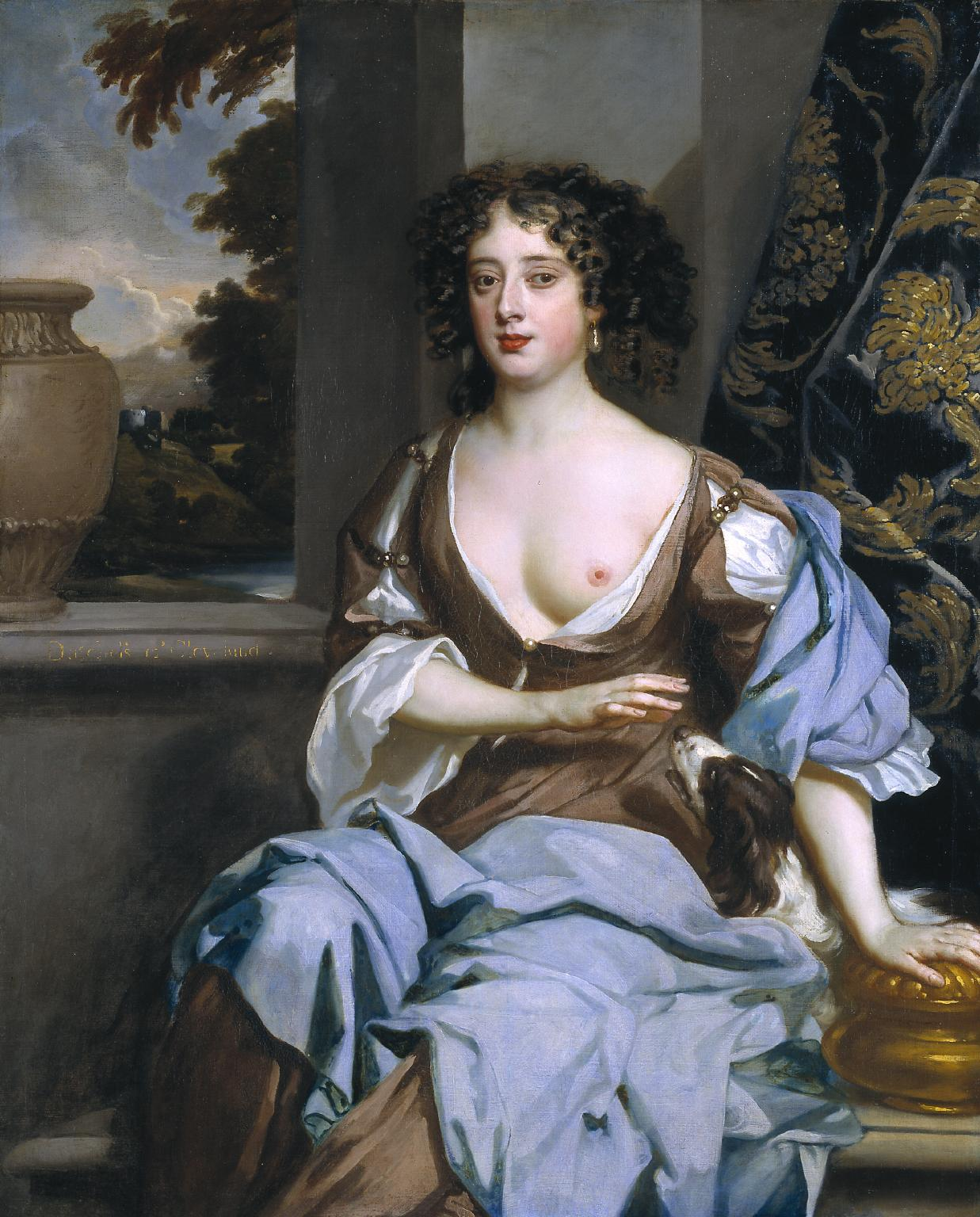
Portrait of Margaret Hughes c. 1670.

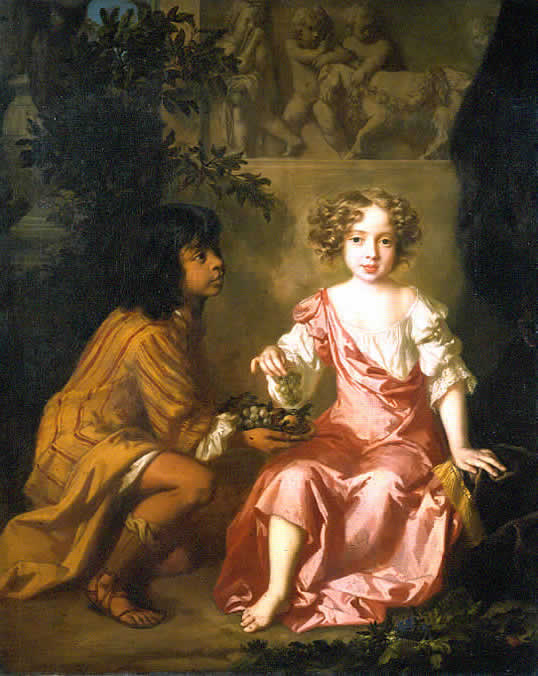
Portrait of Charlotte Lee, Countess of Lichfield 1674

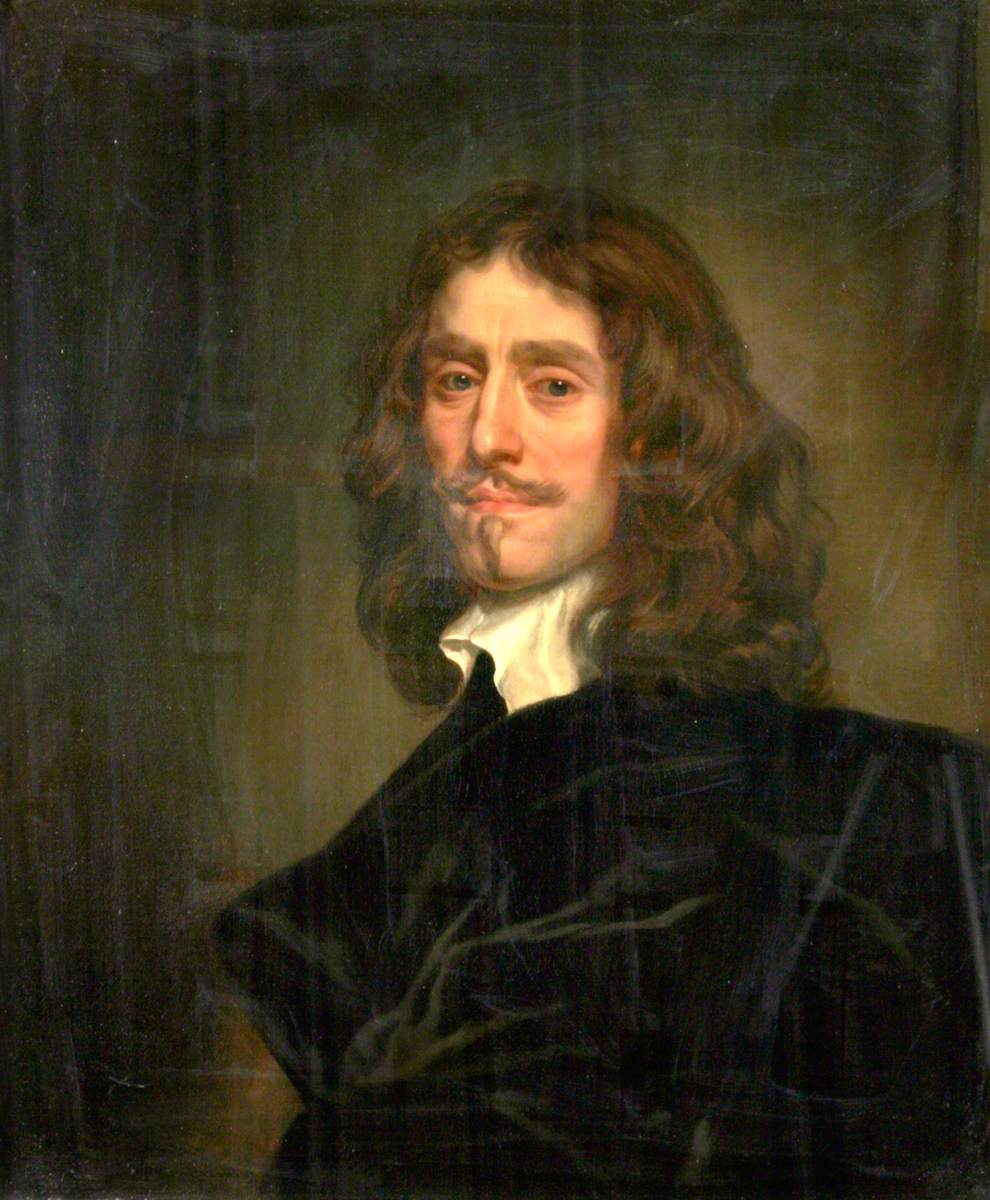
Sir John Holland, 1st Baronet

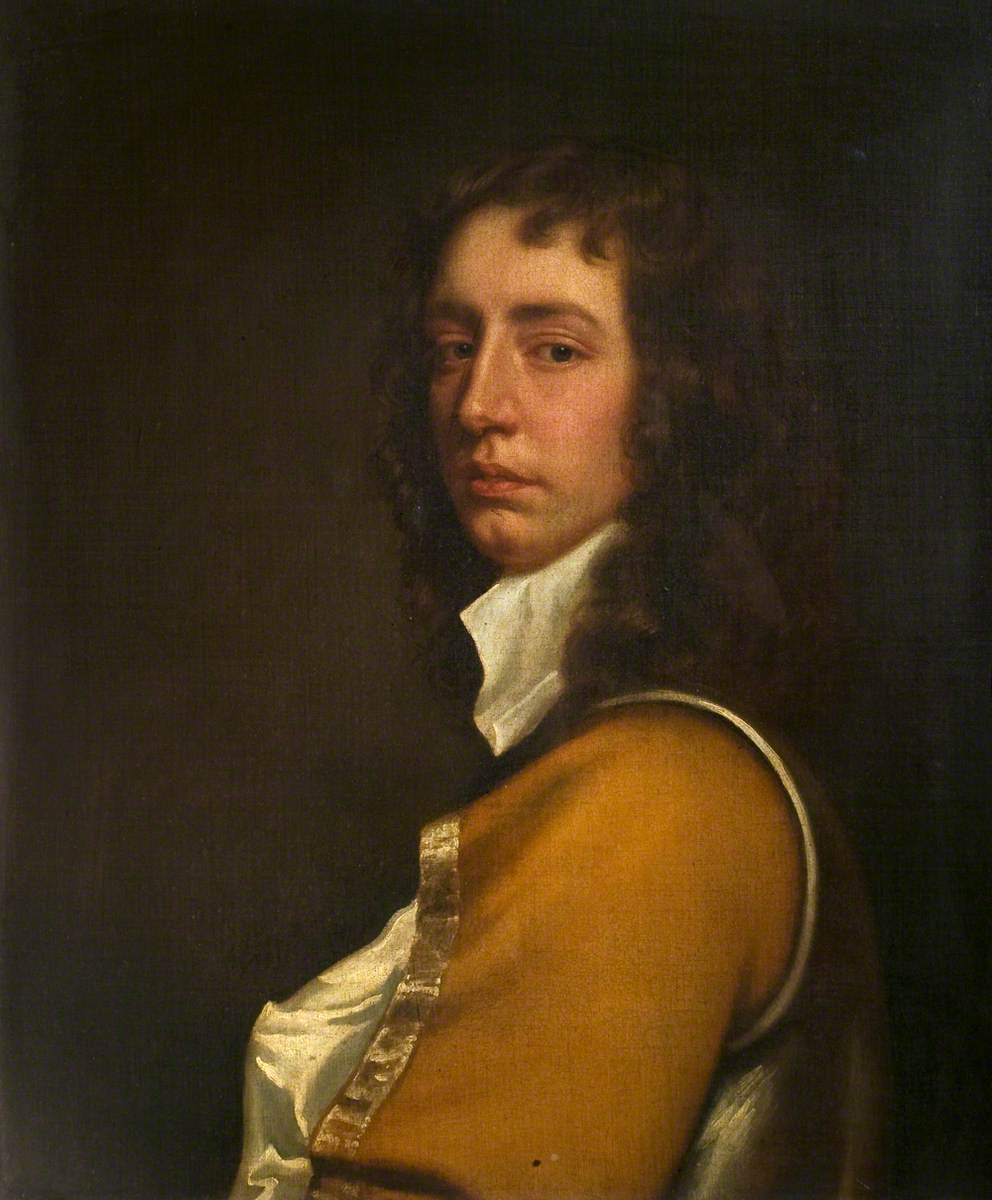
Sir Thomas Lee, 1st Baronet

== General references ==
- Cust, Lionel Henry (1893). "Lely, Peter" . In Lee, Sidney (ed.). Dictionary of National Biography. Vol. 33. London: Smith, Elder & Co. pp. 19–21.
- Dethloff, Diana (21 May 2009). "Lely, Sir Peter (1618–1680)". Oxford Dictionary of National Biography (online ed.). Oxford University Press. doi:10.1093/ref:odnb/16419. (Subscription, Wikipedia Library access or UK public library membership required.)
- "Sir Peter Lely". Britannica.com. 11 September 2018.
- Marciari-Alexander, Julia Mary. "Self-Fashioning and Portraits of Women at the Restoration Court: The Case of Peter Lely and Barbara Villiers, Countess of Castlemaine, 1660–1668." Ph.D. dissertation—Yale University, 1999. Proquest dissertations 9954266.
- Millar, Oliver (2002) [1996]. "Lely, Sir Peter". Grove Dictionary of Art. Vol. 19. London. pp. 119–125. The entry includes a bibliography.
- Millar, Oliver (1978). Sir Peter Lely 1618–80. London: National Portrait Gallery.
- Rossetti, William Michael (1911). "Lely, Sir Peter" . Encyclopædia Britannica. Vol. 16 (11th ed.). p. 408.
- Waterhouse, Ellis (1978). Painting in Britain 1530 to 1790 (Fourth ed.). New York: Viking Penguin.
- Whinney, Margaret; Millar, Oliver (1957). English Art 1625–1714. Oxford: Clarendon Press.

Court offices
Preceded by Anthony van Dyck	Principal Painter in Ordinary to the King; 1661–1680	Succeeded by Godfrey Kneller
