= List of ship launches in the 1650s =

The list of ship launches in the 1650s includes a chronological list of some ships launched from 1650 to 1659.

	Ship	Class / type	Builder	Location	Country	Notes
1650	Advice	Fourth rate	Peter Pett	Woodbridge	Commonwealth of England	For Commonwealth Navy.
1650	Assistance	Fourth rate	Henry Johnson	Deptford	Commonwealth of England	For Commonwealth Navy.
1650	President	Fourth rate	Peter Pett	Deptford Dockyard	Commonwealth of England	For Commonwealth Navy.
1650	Centurion	Fourth rate	Peter Pett	Ratcliff	Commonwealth of England	For Commonwealth Navy.
1650	Fairfax	Speaker-class frigate	Peter Pett	Deptford	Commonwealth of England	For Commonwealth Navy.
1650	Foresight	Fourth rate	Joshua Shish	Deptford Dockyard	Commonwealth of England	For Commonwealth Navy.
1650	Nonsuch	Ketch			Commonwealth of England	For Hudson's Bay Company.
1650	Pelican	Speaker-class frigate	John Taylor	Wapping	Commonwealth of England	For Commonwealth Navy.
1650	Portsmouth	Fourth rate	Peter Pett	Deptford	Commonwealth of England	For Commonwealth Navy.
1650	Prins Willem	East Indiaman		Middelburg	Dutch Republic	For Vereenigde Oostindische Compagnie.
1650	Reserve	Fourth rate	Peter Pett Jr.	Woodbridge	Commonwealth of England	For Commonwealth Navy.
1650	Sophia Amalia	Ship of the line	James Robbins	Hovedøen	Denmark-Norway	For Royal Dano-Norwegian Navy.
1650	Speaker	Speaker-class frigate	Christopher Pett	Deptford Dockyard	Commonwealth of England	For Commonwealth Navy.
1651	Laurel	Fourth rate	John Tippetts	Portsmouth Dockyard	Commonwealth of England	For Commonwealth Navy.
1651	Worcester	Third rate	Burrell	Deptford Dockyard	Commonwealth of England	For Commonwealth Navy.
1651	Mermaid	Fifth rate	Matthew Graves	Limehouse	Commonwealth of England	For Commonwealth Navy.
1651	Sapphire	Fourth rate	Peter Pett	Ratcliff	Commonwealth of England	For Commonwealth Navy.
1651	Vendôme	First rate	Laurent Hubac	Brest	Kingdom of France	For French Navy.
15 March 1652	Ruby	Fourth rate	Peter Pett	Deptford	Commonwealth of England	For Commonwealth Navy.
November 1652	Kentish	Fourth rate	Henry Johnson	Deptford	Commonwealth of England	For Commonwealth Navy.
November 1652	Sussex	Fourth rate			Commonwealth of England	For Commonwealth Navy.
Spring 1652	Antelope	Great frigate		Woolwich Dockyard	Commonwealth of England	For Commonwealth Navy.
1652	Diamond	Fourth rate	Peter Pett	Deptford Dockyard	Commonwealth of England	For Commonwealth Navy.
1652	Drake	Fourth rate	Phineas Pett	Deptford Dockyard	Commonwealth of England	For Commonwealth Navy.
1652	Martin	Sixth rate	Phineas Pett	Portsmouth Dockyard	Commonwealth of England	For Commonwealth Navy.
1652	Merlin	Sixth rate		Chatham Dockyard	Commonwealth of England	For Commonwealth Navy.
May 1653	Newcastle	Fourth rate	Phineas Pett Jr.	Ratcliffe	Commonwealth of England	For Commonwealth Navy.
September 1653	Fairfax	Speaker-class frigate	John Taylor	Chatham Dockyard	Commonwealth of England	For Commonwealth Navy.
1653	Preston	Fourth rate	Carey	Woodbridge	Commonwealth of England	For Commonwealth Navy.
1653	Bristol	Fourth rate	John Tippetts	Portsmouth Dockyard	Commonwealth of England	For Commonwealth Navy.
1653	Hampshire	Fourth rate	Phineas Pett Jr.	Deptford	Commonwealth of England	For Commonwealth Navy.
1653	Leeuwin	Jacht			Dutch Republic	For Vereenigde Oostindische Compagnie.
1653	Lelie	Galiot			Dutch Republic	For Vereenigde Oostindische Compagnie.
1653	Plymouth	Speaker-class frigate	Taylor	Wapping	Commonwealth of England	For Commonwealth Navy.
1653	Portland	Fourth rate	James Taylor	Wapping	Commonwealth of England	For Commonwealth Navy.
1653	Gainsborough	Fourth rate	Thomas Taylor	Pitchouse	Commonwealth of England	For Commonwealth Navy.
1653	Vergulde Draeck	East Indiaman			Dutch Republic	For Vereenigde Oostindische Compagnie.
1653	Wapen van Holland	East Indiaman		Amsterdam	Dutch Republic	For Vereenigde Oostindische Compagnie.
1653	Yarmouth	Fourth rate	Edmund Edgar	Great Yarmouth	Commonwealth of England	For Commonwealth Navy.
21 February 1654	Winsby	Fourth rate	Peter Pett	Deptford	Commonwealth of England	For Commonwealth Navy.
22 May 1654	Tredagh	Third rate	Phineas Pett	Ratcliffe	Commonwealth of England	For Commonwealth Navy.
1654	Agathe	Merchantman			Dutch Republic	For private owner.
1654	Bridgewater	Speaker-class frigate	Chamberlain	Deptford	Commonwealth of England	For Commonwealth Navy.
1654	Arnhem	East Indiaman		Amsterdam	Dutch Republic	For Vereenigde Oostindische Compagnie.
1654	Essex	Speaker-class frigate	Chamberlain	Deptford	Commonwealth of England	For Commonwealth Navy.
1654	Maidstone	Fourth rate	Munday	woodbridge	Commonwealth of England	For Commonwealth Navy.
1654	Nantwich	Fourth rate	Francis Baylie	Bristol	Commonwealth of England	For Commonwealth Navy.
1654	Newbury	Speaker-class frigate	Graves	Limehouse	Commonwealth of England	For Commonwealth Navy.
1654	Taunton	Fourth rate	William Castle	Rotherhithe	Commonwealth of England	For Commonwealth Navy.
1654	Dover	Fourth rate	Castle	Shoreham-by-Sea	Commonwealth of England	For Commonwealth Navy.
1654	Jersey	Fourth rate	Starling	Maldon	Commonwealth of England	For Commonwealth Navy.
1654	Lyme	Speaker-class frigate	John Tippetts	Portsmouth Dockyard	Commonwealth of England	For Commonwealth Navy.
1654	Torrington	Speaker-class frigate	Henry Johnson	Blackwall Yard	Commonwealth of England	For Commonwealth Navy.
1654	Gloucester	Speaker-class frigate	Matthew Graves	Limehouse	Commonwealth of England	For Commonwealth Navy.
1654	Langport	Speaker-class frigate	Bright	Horsleydown	Commonwealth of England	For Commonwealth Navy.
1653	Marston Moor	Speaker-class frigate	Johnson	Blackwall Yard	Commonwealth of England	For Commonwealth Navy.
12 April 1655	Naseby	First rate	Peter Pett Jr.	Woolwich Dockyard	Commonwealth of England	For Commonwealth Navy.
1655	Dartmouth	Fifth rate	John Tippetts	Portsmouth Dockyard	Commonwealth of England	For Commonwealth Navy.
June 1656	London	Second rate	Taylor	Chatham Dockyard	Commonwealth of England	For Commonwealth Navy.
1656	Dunbar	Second rate	Callis	Deptford	Commonwealth of England	For Commonwealth Navy.
26 May 1658	Richard	Second rate	Christopher Pett	Woolwich	Commonwealth of England	For Commonwealth Navy.
February 1659	Leopard	Fourth rate	Jonas Shish	Deptford Dockyard	Commonwealth of England	For Commonwealth Navy.
1659	Monck	Third rate	John Tippetts	Portsmouth Dockyard	Commonwealth of England	For Commonwealth Navy.
1650s	Eendragt	Ship of the line	Jan Salomonszoon van den Tempel	Dordrecht	Dutch Republic	For Dutch Navy.
1650s	Hilversum	Third rate			Dutch Republic	For Dutch Navy.

== Bibliography ==
- Colledge, J. J.; Warlow, Ben & Bush, Steve (2020). Ships of the Royal Navy: The Complete Record of all Fighting Ships of the Royal Navy from the 15th Century to the Present (5th revised and updated ed.). Seaforth Publishing. ISBN 978-1-5267-9327-0.
