= John Chicheley =

Rear-Admiral Sir John Chicheley
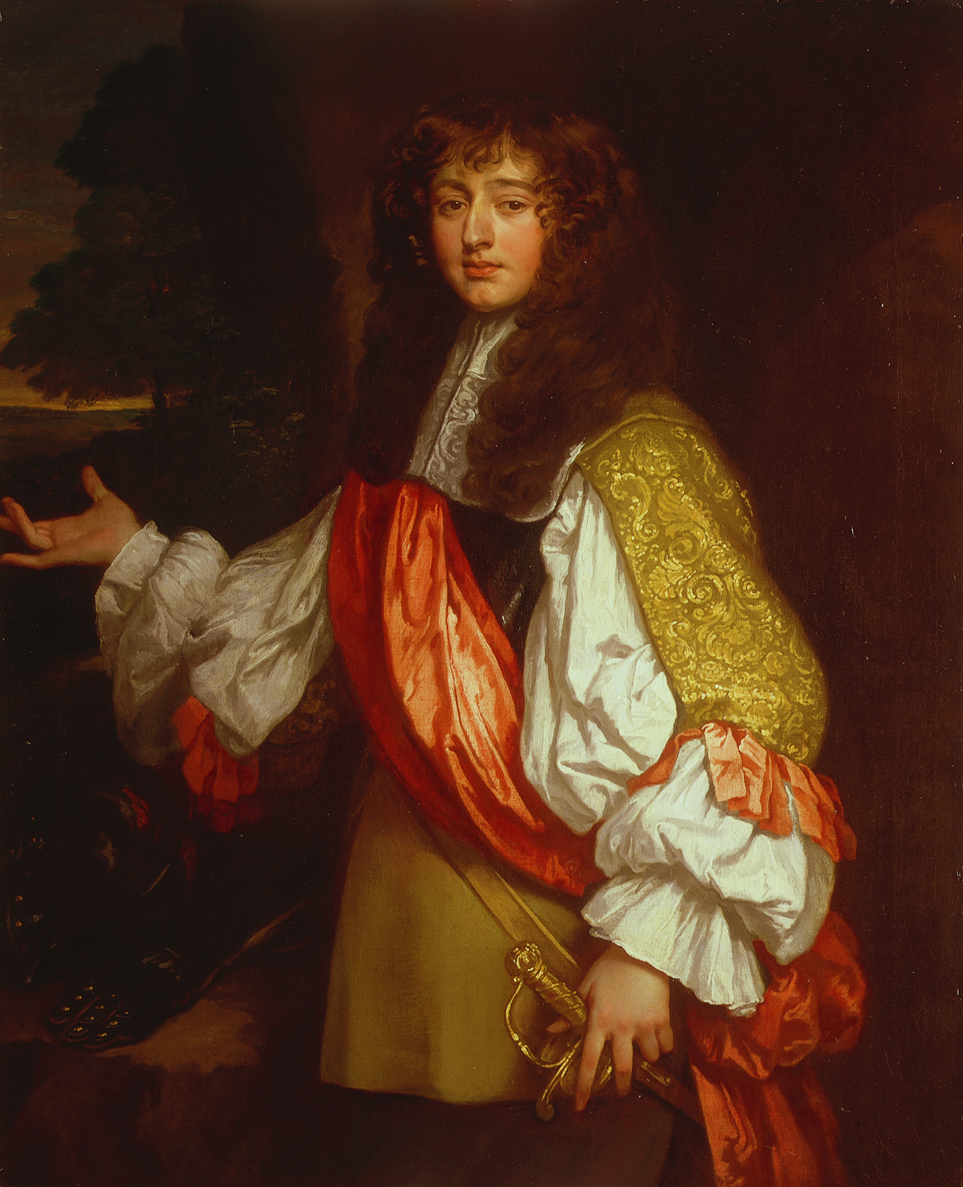
- Sir John Chichley by Jacob Huysmans
- Born: c. 1640
- Died: 20 March 1691 (aged 50–51)
- Military career
- Allegiance: Kingdom of England
- Branch: Royal Navy
- Service years: 1657–1691
- Rank: Rear-Admiral
- Commands: HMS Milford; HMS Bristol; HMS Phoenix; HMS Antelope; HMS Fairfax; HMS Rupert
- Conflicts: Franco-Dutch War

Rear-Admiral Sir John Chicheley (c. 1640 – 20 March 1691) was a Royal Navy officer. He commanded a squadron at the Battle of Schooneveld in June 1673 and the Battle of Texel in August 1673 during the Franco-Dutch War. He went on to be Commissioner of the Ordnance and then Senior Naval Lord. He was also a Member of Parliament.

== Naval career ==
Born the second son of Thomas Chicheley of Wimpole, Chicheley entered the Inner Temple to study the law in 1657. Promoted to lieutenant in 1662 and to post-captain in 1663, he took command of the sixth-rate HMS Milford in August 1664, of the fourth-rate HMS Bristol in September 1664 and of the fourth-rate HMS Phoenix in December 1664. He went on to command the fourth-rate HMS Antelope in October 1665, the third-rate HMS Fairfax in July 1666 and the third-rate HMS Rupert in August 1668. He served as an envoy to the Spanish Netherlands in 1670 and then took command of the third-rate HMS Dreadnought in 1671.

Promoted to rear admiral in 1672, Chicheley commanded a squadron at the Battle of Schooneveld in June 1673 and the Battle of Texel in August 1673 during the Franco-Dutch War. He was elected to the Parliament of England as MP for Newton, Lancashire from 1679 to 1681, 1685 to 1687 and 1689 to 1691.

Chicheley joined the Board of Admiralty under Prince Rupert in September 1677 but stood down to become Commissioner of the Ordnance in May 1679. He resigned as Commissioner of the Ordnance in January 1682 and returned to the Admiralty Board. After advancement to Senior Naval Lord in January 1690, he retired from the Board in June 1690. Chicheley died suddenly on 20 March 1691 and was buried at St Giles in the Fields in London.

== Family ==
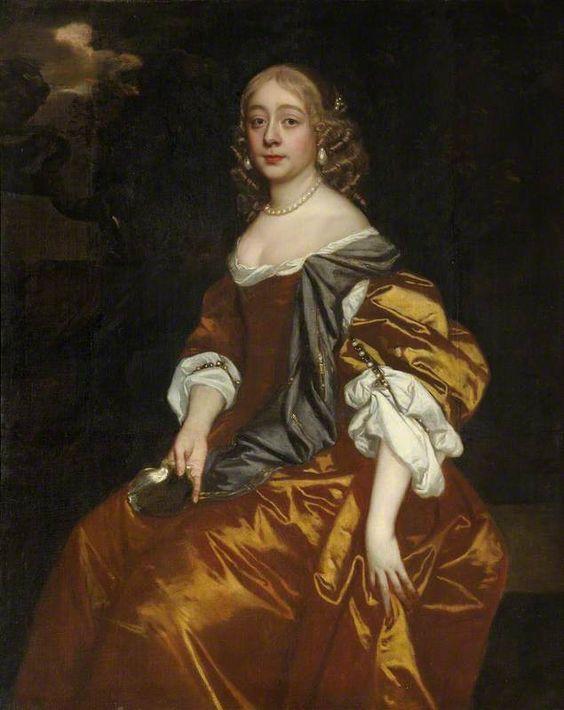
Lady Chicheley

Chicheley married Isabella, the daughter and coheiress of Sir John Lawson of Alresford, Essex, and the widow of Daniel Norton of Southwick, Hampshire. They had four sons (two of whom predeceased him) and two daughters.

== Sources ==
- Rodger, N.A.M. (1979). The Admiralty. Offices of State. Lavenham: T. Dalton Ltd. ISBN 0900963948.

Parliament of England
Preceded by Richard Legh; Lord Gorges of Dundalk	Member for Newton; 1679–1691; With: Andrew Fountaine; Peter Legh; Francis Cholmondeley; George Cholmondeley	Succeeded by John Bennet; George Cholmondeley
Military offices
Preceded by Arthur Herbert	Senior Naval Lord; January 1690–June 1690	Succeeded by Edward Russell
