= HMS York =

Ten ships of the Royal Navy have borne the name HMS York after the city of York, the county seat of Yorkshire, on the River Ouse.

- HMS York (1660), 52-gun Speaker-class frigate launched 1654 as Marston Moor; renamed York upon the Restoration 1660; ran aground and wrecked 1703
- HMS York (1706), 60-gun fourth rate launched 1706; sunk 1751 at Sheerness as a breakwater
- HMS York (1753), 60-gun fourth rate launched 1753; broken up 1772
- HMS York (1777), 12-gun sloop-of-war Betsy captured from the Americans; purchased into the Royal Navy March 1777; captured by the French, 1778; recovered by the British; recaptured by the French, July 1779; renamed Duc D'York; armed with eighteen, 4-pounder guns; broken up 1783
- HMS York (1779), was the former East Indiaman Pigot, which the Royal Navy purchased in 1779 for use as storeship in the West Indies; sold in 1781 to local buyers in India.
- HMS York (1796), 64-gun third rate, intended to be the East Indiaman Royal Admiral; purchased on the stocks 1796 and converted; lost 1804
- HMS York (1807), 74-gun third rate launched 1807; converted to a convict ship 1819; broken up 1854
- HMS York (1915), a former merchant ship used as an armed boarding steamer in the First World War
- HMS York (90), York-class cruiser launched 1928; damaged by Italian motor launches and scuttled in Crete May 1941; scrapped 1952
- HMS York (D98), Type 42 destroyer launched 1982; Decommissioned in 2012

== Battle Honours ==
- Lowestoft 1665
- Orfordness 1666
- Sole Bay 1672
- Schooneveld 1673
- Texel 1673
- Louisbourg 1758
- Martinique 1809
- Atlantic 1939
- Norway 1940
- Mediterranean 1940–41
- Malta Convoys 1941

== See also ==
- HMCS York, Canadian Forces Naval Reserve division in Toronto, Ontario
- HMS Duke of York, several ships of this name
