= John Ashby (Royal Navy officer) =

Admiral Sir John Ashby
- Born: 1646; Italy
- Died: 12 June 1693 (aged 46–47); Portsmouth
- Burial place: Lowestoft
- Military career
- Allegiance: Kingdom of England
- Branch: Royal Navy
- Service years: 1693
- Rank: Admiral
- Commands: HMS Advice; HMS Rainbow; HMS Pearl; HMS Lion; HMS Rose; HMS Dunkirk; HMS Constant Warwick; HMS Mary Rose; HMS Montague; HMS Henrietta; HMS Mordaunt; HMS Defiance
- Conflicts: Third Anglo-Dutch War; Battle of Schooneveld; Battle of Texel; The Glorious Revolution; War of the English Succession; Battle of Beachy Head; Action at Barfleur; Battle of La Hogue

Admiral Sir John Ashby (1646 – 12 June 1693) was an officer of the Royal Navy, who rose to the rank of Admiral. Ashby was the fourth son of Robert Ashby and his wife Alice, who was a sister of Sir Thomas Allin. He grew up in Suffolk where his father was involved in business.

== Early career ==
After Ashby entered the navy he was promoted quickly to lieutenant of HMS Adventure from November 1665 to June 1666. He was subsequently a lieutenant aboard HMS Princess in 1668 before being promoted to first comment on the ketch HMS Deptford in October that year.

== Later career ==
In June 1669 he was given command of HMS Advice, followed by HMS Rainbow between 1670 and 1672. Ashby then was given command of HMS Pearl in January 1672 and remained there for only a year. Once aboard Pearl he fought his first battle at Schooneveld. His second battle was also at Schooneveld, but this time in HMS Lion, serving in Prince Rupert's division of the Red Squadron. His third battle was the Battle of Texel on 11 August 1673, where he fought again in HMS Lion.

From 1674 to 1679 he commanded four more ships in American waters, and played a part in numerous battles concerning the Virginian Revolution. From 1681 to 1684 he commanded HMS Mary Rose escorting the Levant trade. In May 1685 Ashby became the governor of Sandgate Castle.

Sir John also commanded HMS Montague as she was mobilized to counter the rebellion of the Duke of Monmouth followed by the guardship HMS Henrietta, and then HMS Mordaunt, the latter in response to the threatened invasion by William of Orange. Ashby was eventually convinced to command HMS Defiance for William of Orange, as he was persuaded of the need to fight the 'popish oppression' of the current king, James II. After William III was crowned, he knighted Ashby on-board his flagship on 16 May 1689 and made him rear admiral of the Red Squadron soon after. He also presented Ashby with a diamond watch.

== Admiralty ==
In the battle of Beachy Head Ashby served as vice-admiral of the red, flying his flag on HMS Berwick. His conduct was praised by Queen Mary. After the battle he was named joint admiral of the fleet with Sir Richard Haddock and Henry Killigrew.

At the battles of Battle of Barfleur and La Hogue he commanded HMS Victory as Admiral of the Blue. He was called before the House of Commons of England after Barfleur to give an account of why he had not done more to annihilate the French fleet. He was pardoned after he gained the support of Admiral Edward Russell.

From 1690 until his death three years later Ashby served on the Navy Board as Controller of Storekeepers Accounts. Ashby died on 12 June 1693 in Portsmouth and was buried at Lowestoft. In his will he left most of his possessions to his brother, and the rest to cousins and naval colleagues.
