= HMS Mordaunt =

Ship of the line of the Royal Navy

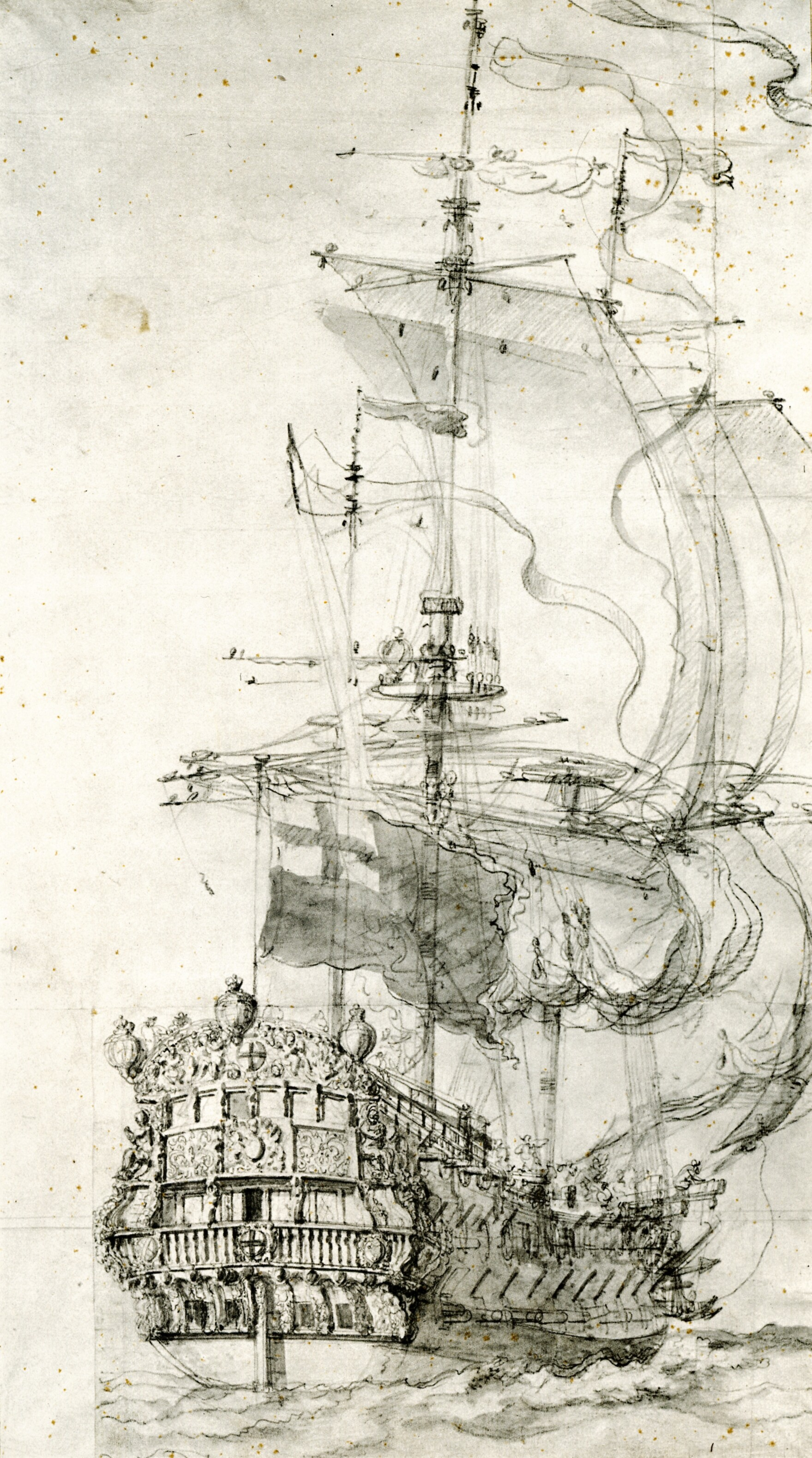
- Drawing of Mordaunt by Willem van de Velde the Elder

History

England
- Name: Mordaunt
- Builder: William Castle, Deptford
- Launched: 1681
- Acquired: 7 October 1682
- Commissioned: 20 May 1684
- In service: 1684–1693
- Fate: Sank off Cuba, 21 November 1693

General characteristics
- Class & type: 46-gun ship of the line
- Tons burthen: 567 26/94 (bm)
- Length: 122 ft 6 in (37.3 m) (gundeck); 101 ft 9 in (31.0 m) (keel)
- Beam: 32 ft 4.5 in (9.9 m)
- Depth of hold: 13 ft 0 in (4.0 m)
- Sail plan: Full-rigged ship
- Complement: 230 at commissioning (wartime)
- Armament: 46 guns comprising: Lower deck: 20 × 12-pounder guns; Upper deck: 18 × 8-pounder guns; Quarterdeck: 8 × 5 1/4-pounder sakers
- Notes: In peacetime, Mordaunt carried one fewer pair of guns on each deck, i.e only 40 guns and only 150 men.

HMS Mordaunt was a 46-gun ship of the line of the Royal Navy, launched at Deptford in 1681 and in active service during the Nine Years' War with France. After extensive service in both European and Caribbean waters, Mordaunt foundered off the coast of Cuba on 21 November 1693.

== Construction ==
Plans for the vessel's construction were developed in the late 1670s by a private syndicate headed by Charles Mordaunt, 3rd Earl of Peterborough, with the publicised intention that she be used solely as a merchantman. A contract for her construction was issued in 1680 to William Castle, a commercial shipwright at Deptford, initially on behalf of the syndicate and then solely in the name of Charles Mordaunt. Castle set to work immediately, and construction proceeded apace. As built, the new ship was 122 ft 6 in (37.3 m) long with a 101 ft 9 in (31.0 m) keel, a beam of 32 ft 4.5 in (9.868 m), and a hold depth of 13 ft 0 in (4.0 m). She was a large vessel, measuring 567 26/94 tons burthen. Castle included a total of 56 gun ports in Mordaunt's design, but several were too constrained by internal fittings to house a gun, and in practice the vessel was not capable of carrying more than 48 cannons.

William Castle died in 1681 and construction was completed by his son, William Castle the Younger.

The vessel's stern featured a carved crest displaying the Mordaunt family coat of arms: a chevron beneath three stars.

== Civilian career ==
Even with 48 guns, Mordaunt would be very heavily armed for a merchant craft, and there were public rumours that she was actually intended as a private warship. In early 1681 Spain's Ambassador to England wrote to Admiralty expressing his fear that the vessel would be sold to the Elector of Brandenburg, who was assembling a fleet to prey on Spanish shipping. Admiralty responded by issuing a warrant on 30 June 1681 for the seizing of the vessel, accompanied by a request that Mordaunt attend the Admiralty Court to explain his intentions in having her constructed. In advance of the hearing, Admiralty itself advised the court that Mordaunt was "built frigate-fashion and is as good a ship as His Majesty's ship [the 48-gun] Tyger." Charles Mordaunt appeared before the court in July to attest that the vessel was indeed a merchantman, and that the heavy armament was simply to enable her to sail without convoy protection. The Court resolved to return the vessel to Mordaunt but obliged him to guarantee that she would not be used for military purposes.

The vessel was completed in 1681, and a crew of 200 were hired and brought aboard. Problems then arose with their pay, with the ship's company lodging a civil action for non-payment of wages in 1682. Admiralty again seized the vessel while this claim was being heard, but simultaneously entered negotiations for her purchase. The sale was completed on 7 October 1682, with the vessel entering Navy service as HMS Mordaunt. Her crew were offered a transfer into naval service to accompany their ship, and most agreed; the civil claim was settled in their favour in May 1683 but the outstanding wages were never subsequently paid.

== Naval career ==
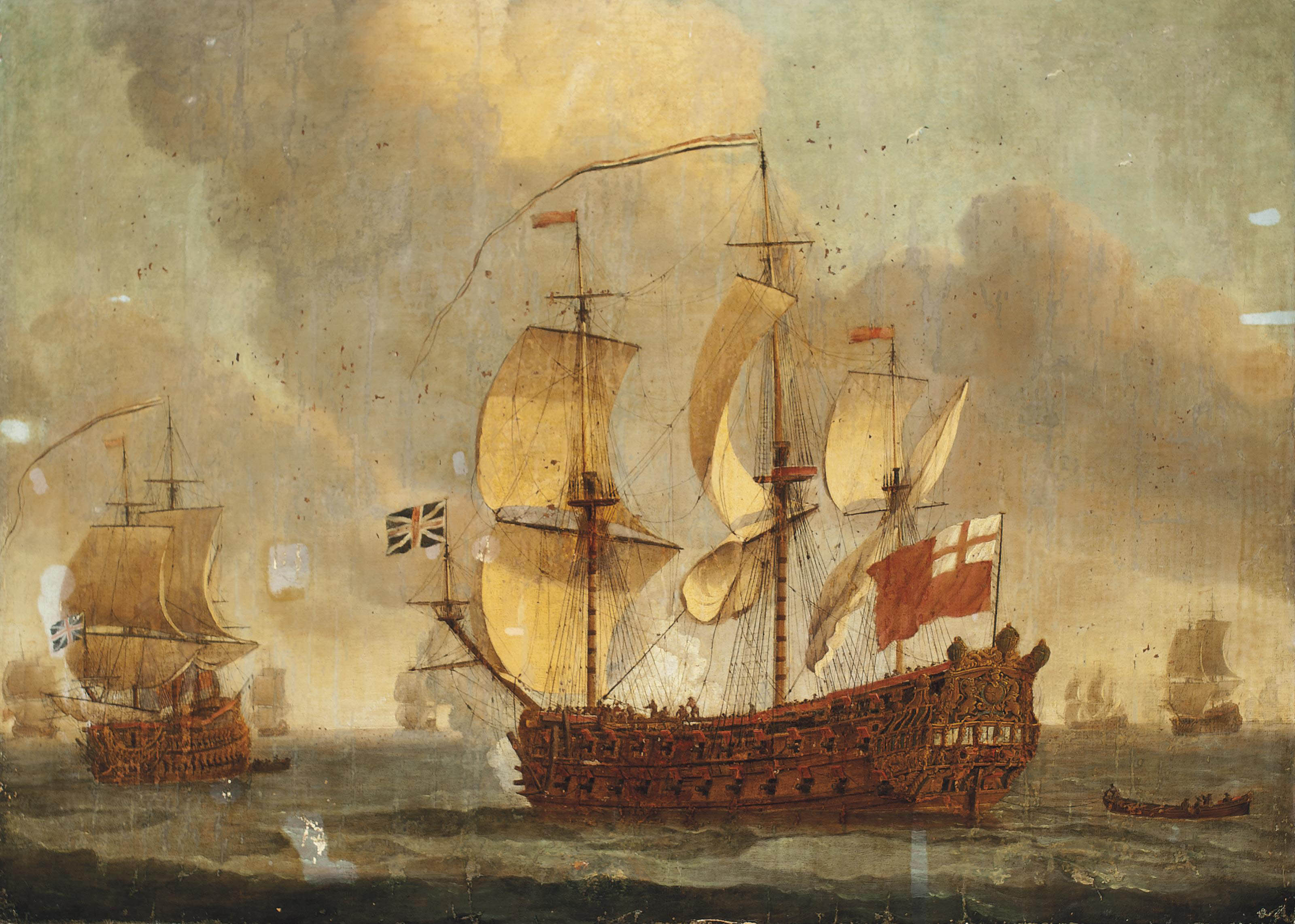
An English Fourth Rate ship-of-the-line, thought to be the 46-gun Mordaunt, announcing her departure from the Fleet anchorage (Willem van de Velde the Elder)

The newly purchased vessel was sailed to Deptford Dockyard in late 1682, for fitting out as a Royal Navy ship of the line. She remained at Deptford throughout 1683, finally being commissioned into active service on 20 May 1684 under the command of Captain Henry Killigrew. The War of the Reunions had broken out in Europe, but Britain was at least temporarily at peace and Mordaunt was sent to cruise along the coastline of West Africa as protection for Britain's regional merchant and slave-trading interests. She returned to England in 1685, where she remained for the next two years. Killigrew left the vessel in 1687, with command transferring to Captain John Ashby.

Her first listed commander is Captain Henry Killigrew, who took her off the west coast of Africa. In 1685 she returned to Britain and was involved in the suppression of the Argyll Uprising later that year, in which she must have captured the Sophia, as her crew were awarded a share of the £5000 prize paid by the English government in August 1685.

On 4 October 1689 near the Scilly Isles, under Captain John Tyrrell, together with HMS Foresight and HMS Lively Prize, she was involved in an unwise attack on 12 French men-of-war, in which all British ships were damaged and the Lively Prize was captured.

In April 1690 the Mordaunt crossed the Atlantic and sailed to the West Indies. In January 1692 she joined HMS Norwich and HMS Diamond in Barbados under overall command of Commodore Ralph Wrenn. The ships were sent to search for the French squadron somewhere around Barbados. Unsuccessful, they returned to Carlisle Bay on 5 February and on 17 February sailed to Jamaica.

On 22 February 1692, now under Captain Henry Boteler, she was involved in a battle alongside Norwich and Diamond again, but additionally joined by HMS Mary and HMS Antelope, in which they engaged eighteen French ships, including Le Vermandois, Le Vaillant and La Légère, off the island of Desirade. Mordaunt was damaged in the attack and Ralph Wrenn (on Norwich) wounded, dying a few days later.

In June 1692 she went to Jamaica, where HMS Swan had been wrecked, so her crew were split between the Mordaunt and HMS Guernsey. In April 1693 she unsuccessfully pursued French privateers. Later in the same month she returned from Porto Bello with 100,000 pieces of eight from the Assiento.

In May 1693 the Council of Jamaica ordered the careening of the Mordaunt. At this stage she was under command of Captain Francis Maynard and a debate began as to whether or not she be allowed to return to England. She was obliged to stay in Jamaica and in July was sent to harass the French around Hispaniola, returning to Jamaica in October.

On her final mission she was escorting a convoy when she was struck by a storm off the coast of Cuba. She sank with all hands (around 230 men), including Captain Maynard, on 21 November 1693.
