= English ship Winsby =

Ship of the line of the Royal Navy

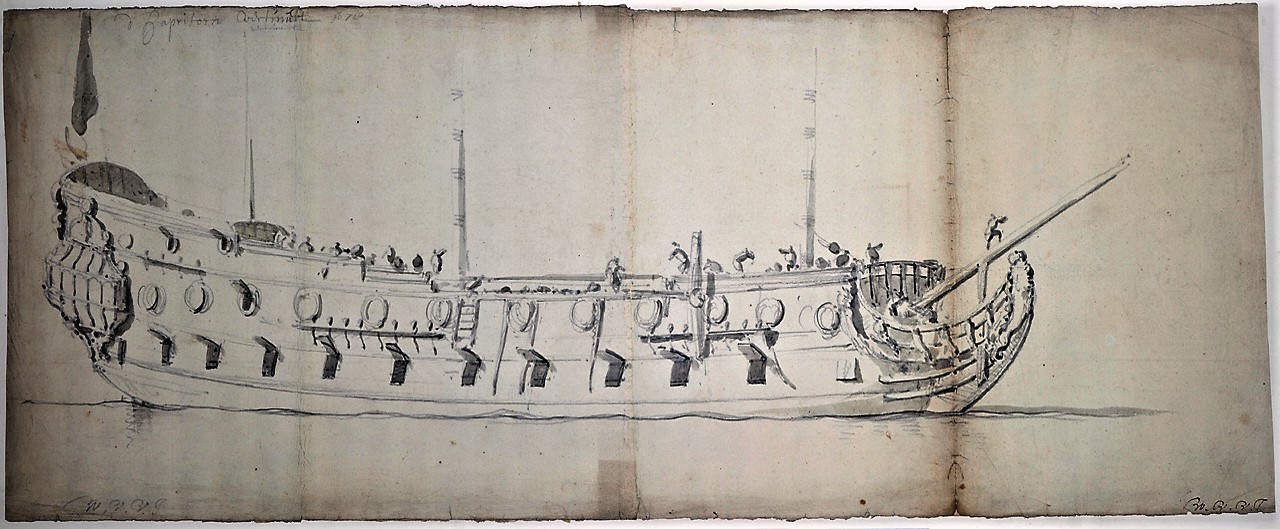
- A freely and accurately made drawing of HMS Happy Return by Willem van de Velde the Elder or his son of the same name, Royal Museums Greenwich

History

Commonwealth of England
- Name: Winsby
- Ordered: 27 December 1652
- Builder: Edmund Edgar, Yarmouth
- Launched: 21 February 1654

History

England
- Renamed: HMS Happy Return, 1660
- Captured: 1691, by the French

France
- Acquired: 1691

General characteristics
- Class & type: Fourth-rate frigate
- Tons burthen: 605
- Length: 104 ft (31.7 m) (keel)
- Beam: 33 ft 2 in (10.1 m)
- Draught: 17 ft 0 in (5.2 m)
- Depth of hold: 13 ft 2 in (4.0 m)
- Propulsion: Sails
- Sail plan: Full-rigged ship
- Armament: 44 guns (1660); 54 guns (1677)

The English ship Winsby (renamed HMS Happy Return in 1660) was a 44-gun fourth-rate frigate, built for the navy of the Commonwealth of England at Great Yarmouth, and launched in February 1654. Winsby was named for the Parliamentarian victory at the Battle of Winceby (1643).

After the restoration of the monarchy in 1660, Winsby was renamed, as her original name was incompatible with the restored Stuart monarchy.

== Construction and commissioning ==
The frigate Winsby was a fourth rate, named after the Battle of Winceby (1643). She was ordered by the Commonwealth on 27 December 1652. The ship was launched on 21 February 1654.

The English ship Winsby cost the navy £3,932. It was built at Great Yarmouth in Norfolk under the direction of master shipwright Edmund Edgar. She had a length at the gun deck of 104 ft (31.7 m), a beam of 33 ft 2 in (10.1 m), a draught of 17 ft 0 in (5.2 m), and a depth of hold of 13 ft 2 in (4.0 m). The ship's tonnage was 605 tons burthen. Originally built for 50 guns, by 1666 she was carrying 52 guns (8 sakers, 22 culverins, and 22 demi-culverins). By 1685, this had changed to 48 guns (22 culverins, 20 demi-culverins and 6 demi-culverin cutts). The ship had a crew of 190 officers and ratings in 1666.

== Career ==
Winsby was commissioned in 1654 under Captain Joseph Ames (until 1660), and fought at the Battle of Santa Cruz (20 April 1657). During 1659 she was in operations in the Sound.

Winsby was renamed after the restoration of the monarchy in 1660, as her original name was incompatible with the restored Stuart monarchy. Under Ames, Happy Return served in the North Sea in June 1660. In September that year she came under the command of Captain John Tyrwhit. Robert Moulton was captain from 31 May 1664 to 16 August 1664. From 4 October 1664 to 25 August the following year she was under Captain James Lambert—under Lambert she fought at the Battle of Lowestoft (Red squadron, Centre division) on 3 June 1665, and at the Battle of Vägen on 3 August that year. From 28 August 1665 to 11 June 1666, Henry Cuttance was her captain. Happy Return took part in the Four Days' Battle (White squadron, Van division), 1–4 June 1666. From 12 June 1666 to 11 October 1667, she was under Captain Francis Courtney.

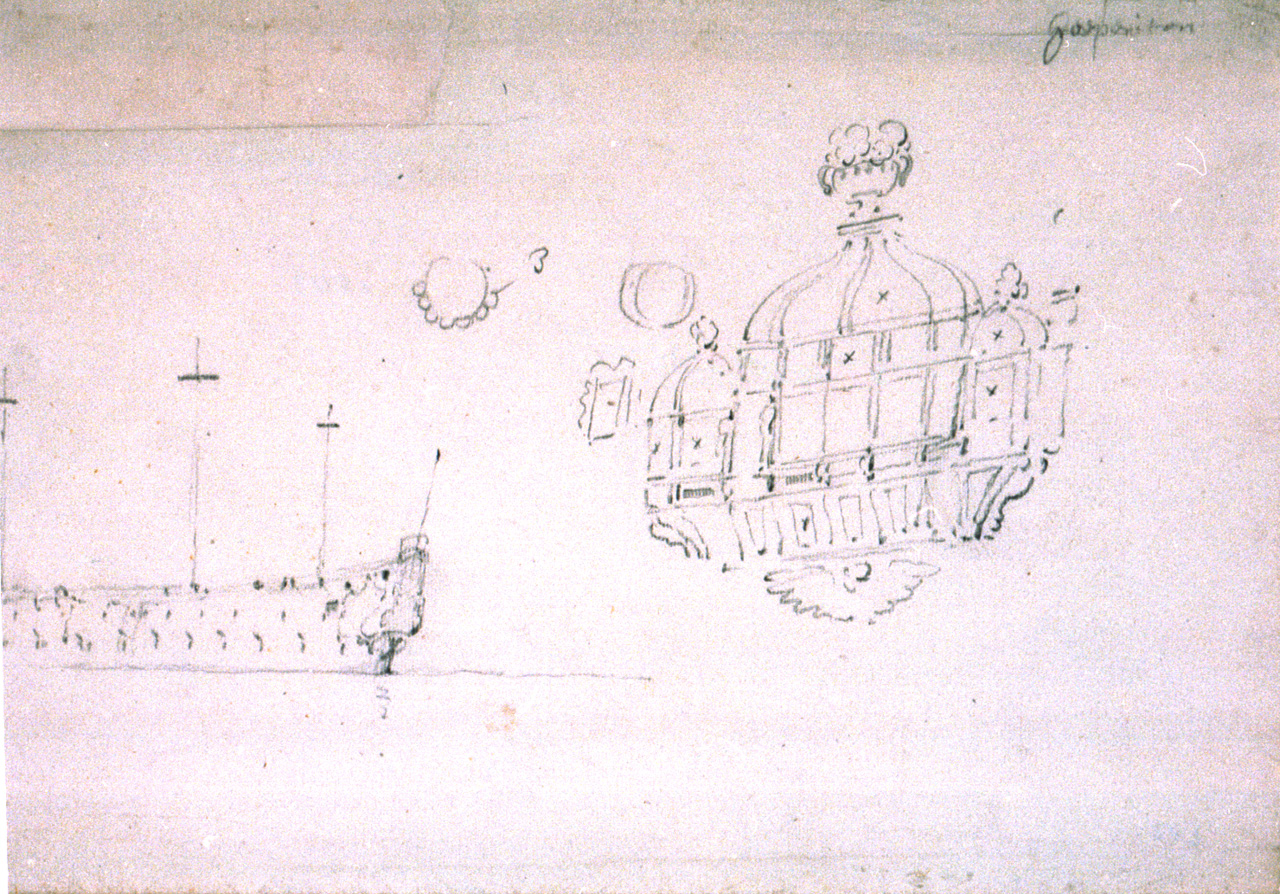
Willem van de Velde the Younger (c. 1685), The quarter-gallery of the Happy Return, Royal Museums Greenwich

Happy Return fought in both Battles of Schooneveld (25 May and 4 June 1673). By 1677. her armament had been increased from 44 to 54 guns. In 1678 she was operating in the Mediterranean, and took part in the expedition to Tangier in 1681. In 1685 she was in home waters and back in the Mediterranean, where she returned in 1690. on 22 April 1690 she captured the 32-gun ship La Vierge de Grace. The following year she saw convoy service off Barfleur

Happy Return was amongst those warships led by HMS Gloucester which was commissioned to convey James Stuart, Duke of York (the future King James II of England) to Scotland. On 6 May 1682, Gloucester struck a sandbank off the Norfolk coast, and quickly sank. The Duke was saved, but as many as 250 people drowned, including members of the royal party.

On 4 November 1691, Happy Return was captured by French privateers off Dunkirk, and was renamed the Hereux Retour.

== Sources ==
- Davies, J.D. (2008). "Berry, Sir John". Oxford Dictionary of National Biography (online ed.). Oxford: Oxford University Press. doi:10.1093/ref:odnb/2265. OCLC 56568095. (Subscription, Wikipedia Library access or UK public library membership required.)
- Jowitt, Claire (2022). "The Last Voyage of the Gloucester (1682): The Politics of a Royal Shipwreck". The English Historical Review. 137 (586): 728–762. doi:10.1093/ehr/ceac127.
- Lavery, Brian (1983). The Ship of the Line. Vol. 1: The Development of the Battlefleet 1650–1850. Conway Maritime Press. ISBN 978-0-85177-252-3.
- Seymour, Michael (1990). Laughton, L. G. Carr; Anderson, Roger Charles; Perrin, William Gordon (eds.). "Warships' Names of the English Republic, 1649–1659". The Mariner's Mirror. 76 (4). London: Society for Nautical Research: 317–324. doi:10.1080/00253359.1990.10656319. ISSN 0025-3359.
- Winfield, Rif (2003). British Warships in the Age of Sail 1603–1714: design, construction, careers and fates. Barnsley, UK: Seaforth Publishing. ISBN 978-1-84832-040-6.
