= French ship Vendôme (1651) =

Ship of the line of the French Navy

History

France
- Name: Vendôme
- Namesake: César de Bourbon, Duc de Vendôme
- Owner: French Royal Navy
- Builder: Laurent Hubac, in Brest Dockyard
- Laid down: 1647
- Launched: 1651
- Completed: 1654
- Out of service: 1667
- Renamed: Victorieux on 24 June 1671
- Fate: Taken to pieces in 1679

General characteristics
- Class & type: ship of the line
- Tonnage: 1,450 tons
- Length: 150 French feet (Note: The (pre-metric) French foot was 6.575% longer than the equivalent English foot.)
- Beam: 40 French feet
- Draught: 17½ French feet
- Depth of hold: 17½ French feet
- Decks: 3 gun decks
- Complement: 600 (later 550), +9 officers
- Armament: 72 guns: 12 × 24-pounder long guns + 14 × 18-pounder long guns on lower deck; 14 × 18-pounder long guns + 12 × 12-pounder long guns on middle deck; 14 × 8-pounder long guns on upper deck (6 forward of and 8 aft of the unarmed midships section of this deck); 6 × 4-pounder long guns on poop (later removed)
- Armour: Timber

Vendôme was a 72-gun ship of the line of the French Royal Navy, the smallest ship to be classed as a First Rank ship in the French Navy. She was built at Brest Dockyard, designed and constructed by Laurent Hubac. She was nominally a three-decker, but in practice the upper deck was divided into armed sections aft and forward of the unarmed waist, making the upper deck equivalent to a quarterdeck and forecastle.

== Service history ==
Vendôme was commissioned in March 1665, began reconstruction at Brest Dockyard in August 1665, and became the flagship of the Ponant (Atlantic) Fleet under chef d'escadre Abraham Duquesne on 29 April 1666.

== Disposal ==
Her name was technically altered to Victorieux on 24 June 1671, but this was not put into practice as she was condemned on 17 July 1671 and she became a careening hulk at Brest until condemned in 1679.
