= HMS Helverson =

Frigate of the Royal Navy

History

England
- Name: HMS Helverson
- Launched: 1655
- In service: Captured from the Dutch during the Battle of Lowestoft on 13 June 1665
- Renamed: Previously Hilversum; renamed Helverson on capture
- Fate: Sunk as blockship on 12 June 1667 during the Raid on the Medway

General characteristics
- Class & type: third rate frigate
- Tons burthen: 597 tons
- Length: 136 ft (41 m)
- Beam: 34 ft (10 m)
- Complement: 258
- Armament: 60 guns

HMS Helverson was formerly Hilversum of the Admiralty of Amsterdam. She was built around 1655 as a third rate frigate.

Hilversum was attacked in the Battle of Lowestoft by the fireship HMS Bramble, under Captain Napthali Ball. Hilversum was captured by other British ships as the crew of the Hilversum fought the fire.

Renamed HMS Helverson, the ship was sunk to block the River Medway from the invading Dutch fleet on 12 June 1667. The Dutch fleet was attempting to raid the docks at Chatham Dockyard. John Evelyn drew a sketch 'A scheme of the 12th of June 1667' depicting the position of HMS Helverson. She has been the only ship of the Royal Navy to be called HMS Helverson.
