= English ship Fairfax (1653) =

Naval frigate of the Commonwealth of England

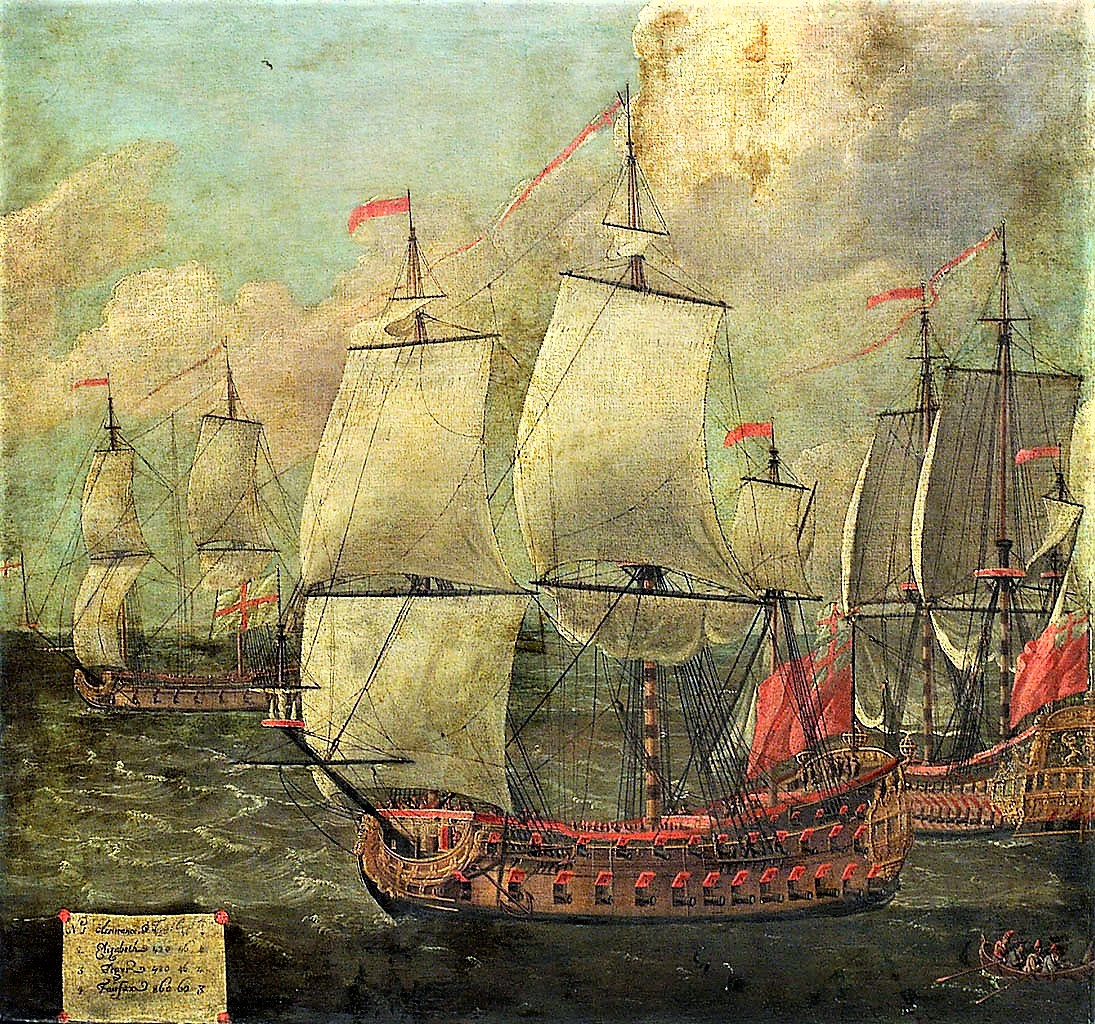
- The Fairfax (at the forefront), with Elizabeth astern of her, and Assurance or Tiger to her left, a painting attributed to Isaac Sailmaker

History

England
- Name: Fairfax
- Namesake: Thomas Fairfax
- Builder: John Taylor, Chatham
- Laid down: March 1653
- Launched: September 1653
- Commissioned: September 1653
- In service: 1653–1660
- Stricken: 1660

England
- Name: HMS Fairfax
- Acquired: 1660
- Commissioned: 1660
- In service: 1660–1674
- Honours and awards: Participated in: Battle of Lowestoft, 1664
- Fate: Broken up, 1674.

General characteristics
- Class & type: Speaker-class frigate
- Tons burthen: 78935/94 (bm)
- Length: 118 ft (36.0 m) (keel)
- Beam: 34 ft 9 in (10.6 m)
- Depth of hold: 14 ft 4 in (4.4 m)
- Propulsion: Sails
- Sail plan: Full-rigged ship
- Armament: 52 guns from 1660; 66 guns from 1666; 72 guns from 1672

Fairfax was a third rate frigate of the navy of the Commonwealth of England from 1653 to 1660. With the restoration of the English monarchy in 1660 she was recommissioned as HMS Fairfax and served with the Royal Navy until 1674.

== Construction ==
Fairfax was constructed between March and September 1653 by shipwright John Taylor of Chatham, at a total cost of £7,065. She was a replacement for the Fairfax of 1650, which had burnt to the waterline in 1652, and like her was named after the Parliamentary forces leader Thomas Fairfax (Lord Fairfax of Cameron). The unburnt portion of this earlier vessel was retained and built upon to construct the new ship.

As built, Fairfax was 120 ft 0 in (36.58 m) along her keel with a beam of 35 ft 2 in (10.72 m) and a hold depth of 14 ft 6 in (4.42 m). She was a large vessel, measuring 789 35/94 tons burthen with a draft of 17 ft 6 in (5.33 m). Her crew complement at launch was not recorded. However at the time of her transfer to the Royal Navy in 1660 she carried 220 men, rising to 300 in 1666 and 400 in 1672.

From 1660 Fairfax carried 52 guns. In 1666 this was increased to 66, comprising twenty-two demi-cannons, four culverins, twenty-six 12-pounders and fourteen 5 1/4-pounder sakers. A further substantial increase in armament occurred in 1672, with the replacement of the unwieldy demi-cannons and an increase in total weaponry to 72 guns. Her lower deck was fitted with twenty-six iron-cast 24-pounders, supported by twenty-four 12-pounders on the upper deck. Fourteen brass sakers were placed along the quarterdeck with another four in the forecastle. Two additional sakers and two 12-pounder cannons, were located in the captain's cabin running the length of the stern.

== Commonwealth service ==
Fairfax was launched in September 1653 for service in the First Anglo-Dutch War. Her first commander was Captain Edward Blagg, but he was superseded within three months by Captain John Lawson. Lawson held the captaincy until 1655, when he was replaced in turn by Blagg. Under Blagg's renewed command Fairfax played an active role in the Battle of Santa Cruz on 20 April 1657. Blagg was replaced in 1658 by Captain Thomas Whetstone, with Fairfax assigned to the Commonwealth squadron stationed in the Mediterranean.

== Royal Navy service ==
The English monarchy was restored to power in 1660, and Fairfax was promptly commissioned into the Royal Navy under a new commander, Captain Thomas Tiddeman. From 1661 the frigate was part of Lord Sandwich's Mediterranean fleet, and was off Tangier in May of that year and Algiers in January 1662. In October 1664 she was under the command of Captain Robert Salmon during the Battle of Lowestoft. Salmon died in October 1665 and was replaced by Captain John Watley, who died four weeks later and was replaced in turn by Captain Christopher Myngs.

In 1673, after thirteen years of Royal Navy service, Fairfax struck a sandbank off the English coast. She was refloated a month later, but was found to be unserviceable. Transported to Woolwich Dockyard, she was broken up in 1674 and her timbers reused in other vessels.
