= Speaker-class frigate =

Class of third rate based on Speaker

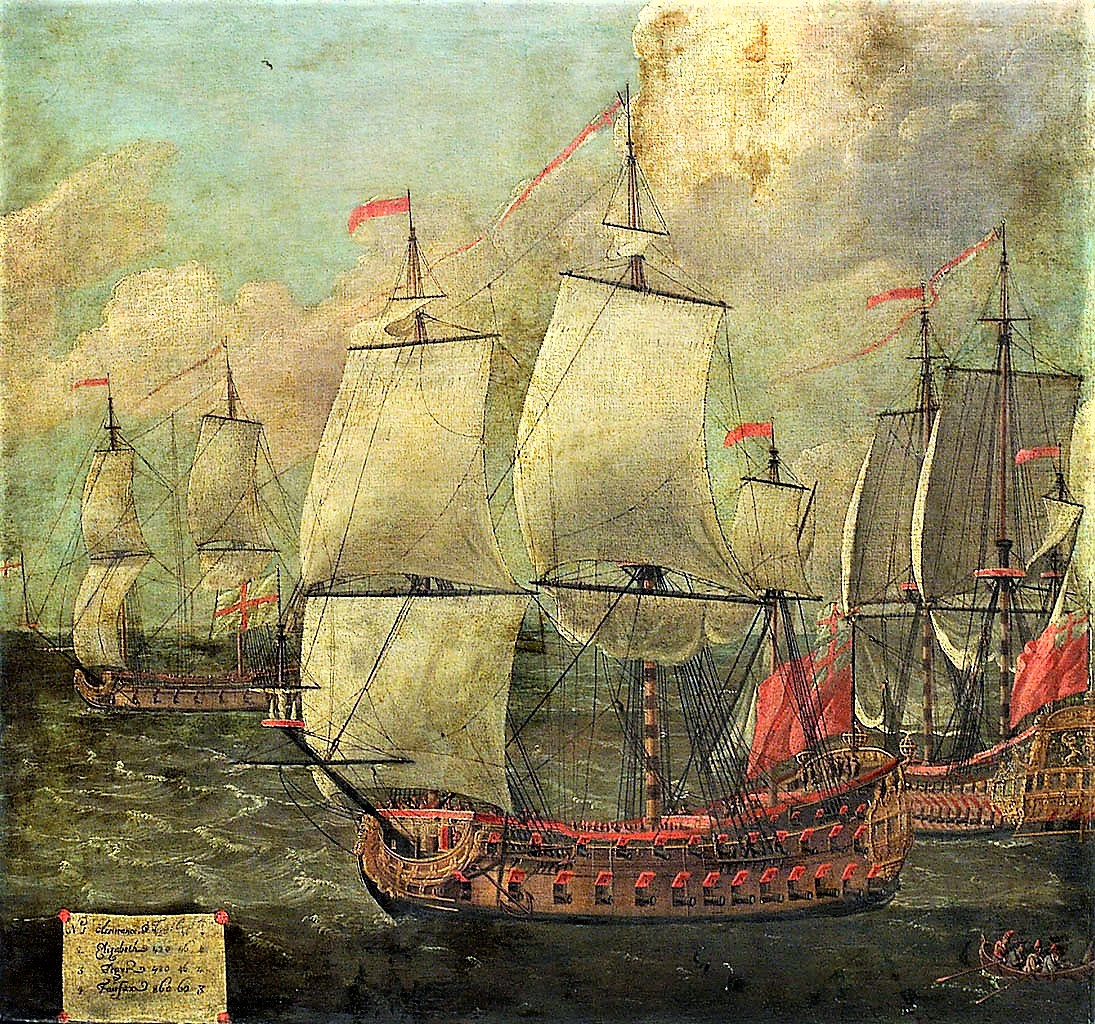
A group of warships with HMS Fairfax (launched in 1653) at the fore, Royal Museums Greenwich

The Speaker-class frigate was a type of English ship built early in the First Dutch War of 1652. The English government of the day, after it recognised the usefulness of large ships, ordered 30 new frigates to be built (although only 20 were actually contracted for), of which nine were to be Third Rates of 52 guns each. An early example of a large frigate, Speaker, launched in April 1650, provided the prototype for the class.

All nine were ordered in December 1652, and (together with the somewhat longer Essex ordered earlier in April before the outbreak of war), were launched in 1653 and 1654. The Speaker-class warships were about 750 tons and carried between 48 and 56 cannon. Their introduction caused the Dutch navy, which was still reliant on the use of armed merchant ships, to become obsolete. Speaker-class ships had much in common with the old Great Ships planned in 1618, being of a similar size, with two decks and a large number of guns. The class set the pattern for all the two-deck ships built up to the 19th century.

The third rate frigates in the Speaker-class built as part of the 1652 programme were Plymouth, Torrington, Newbury, Bridgewater, Lyme, Marston Moor, Langport, Tredagh, and Gloucester. The somewhat larger Fairfax was built under the 1653 Programme as a replacement for the previous ship of that name lost early in 1653.

== Sources ==
- Dull, Jonathan R. (2009). The Age of the Ship of the Line: British and French Navies 1650–1815. Barnsley, UK: Pen & Sword Books Limited. ISBN 978-18483-2-549-4.
- Lavery, Brian (1983). The Ship of the Line. Vol. 1: The Development of the Battlefleet 1650–1850. Conway Maritime Press. ISBN 978-0-85177-252-3.
- Lavery, Brian (2015). The Ship of the Line: a history in ship models. Barnsley, UK: Pen & Sword Books Limited. ISBN 978-18483-2-214-1.
