= Lelie =

17th Century Dutch ship

History

Dutch Republic
- Name: Lelie
- Owner: Dutch East India Company; Chamber of Amsterdam
- Completed: 1653
- Fate: Wrecked

General characteristics
- Class & type: East Indiaman
- Type: Galiot
- Length: 30m

Lelie was a 17th-century East Indiaman galiot of the Dutch East India Company.

During her first voyage to Batavia Dutch East Indies, she wrecked at Texel in January 1654. 60 crew members who tried to save themselves drowned, the people who stayed onboard were rescued and also the cargo was rescued. The wreck was found in 1997 and several items with historic value are salvaged.

== Ship details ==
Lelie was a galiot, built in 1653 in Amsterdam for the Chamber of Amsterdam. She was 30 meters long.

== History and fate ==
After being launched in 1653, she was from November 1653 prepared for her first voyage to Batavia, Dutch East Indies. During this voyage she would be part of a fleet.

In January 1654 she was at the Texel roadstead. On or around 12 January 1654, during a storm, she lost her anchor and foundered. She fell to its side. Sixty sailors tried to save themselves by getting off the ship, but they all drowned. The sailors who remained on board were rescued, together with the cargo. They were transferred with four chests of money to Roos, another VOC ship in the fleet.

== Aftermath ==
The Heeren XVII, the central government of the Dutch East India Company, met to discuss the accident of the Lelie, and the repair of the Goudsbloem, another ship that had lost its mast during the storm. It was decided to salvage both ships. The costs of salvage would be paid by the Chamber of Enkhuizen. In the following weeks, the Heeren XVII had a meeting to discuss the wages that the survivors of the Lelie should receive. The Chamber of Enkhuizen eventually paid this, as well as the wages of the salvors.

== Wreck ==
In August 1997 the wreck was discovered by diver Hans Eelman, at a depth of 7 metres. Several items were salvaged, including a Jacob's staff dated 1653, tobacco boxes with an inscription of the Royal Palace of Amsterdam and a complete four-wheeled vehicle used to carry and manipulate a cannon (in Dutch called rolpaard). The vehicle is specifically conserved. Items have been described by Rijksdienst voor het Cultureel Erfgoed in 2012.
