= English ship Kentish (1652) =

17th century 40-gun fourth-rate frigate of the Commonwealth of England Navy

History

Commonwealth of England
- Name: Kentish
- Owner: British government
- Ordered: 1 April 1652
- Builder: Henry Johnson, Deptford
- Launched: November 1652

England
- Name: HMS Kent
- Owner: Royal Navy
- Acquired: 1660
- Fate: Wrecked, 15 October 1672

General characteristics
- Class & type: frigate (fourth rate)
- Tons burthen: 601 tons
- Length: 107 ft (32.6 m) (keel)
- Beam: 32 ft 6 in (9.9 m)
- Depth of hold: 13 ft 6 in (4.1 m)
- Sail plan: Full-rigged ship
- Complement: 180 in 1653
- Armament: 40 guns in 1652; 46 guns by 1666

The English ship Kentish (changed to HMS Kent after the Restoration of the monarchy in 1660) was a 40-gun fourth-rate frigate of the Commonwealth of England Navy, built by contract at Deptford (not in the Dockyard) and launched in November 1652.

Kentish was commissioned in early 1653 under Captain Jacob Reynolds and saw active service in the Battle of Portland on 18 February that year, and the Battle of the Gabbard from 2 June. Command was then passed to Captain Edward Witheridge, with Kentish returned to Chatham for the winter. In early 1654 she was assigned to the British squadron in the Mediterranean, where she remained until mid-1655. Her most famous action was on 4 April 1655, when she attacked a squadron of Tunisian warships lying in Porto Farina, on the Barbary Coast. She defeated both the ships and the on-shore fort to win her third battle honour.

She served in both the First and Second Dutch Wars with distinction. As the Royal Navy ship HMS Kent, she was involved in the Battle of Lowestoft on 13 June 1665, and the St. James's Day Battle on 25 July 1666. She was wrecked in October 1672 off Cromer.

In 2007, when the wreck of HMS Gloucester was found 28 miles (45 km) off the Norfolk coast, the finding of the ship's bell ruled out the possibility of the wreck being HMS Kent, the only other Royal Navy ship of the period to be shipwrecked in the area.

== Sources ==
- Lavery, Brian (1983). The Ship of the Line. Vol. 1: The Development of the Battlefleet 1650–1850. Conway Maritime Press. ISBN 978-0-85177-252-3.
- Winfield, Rif (2009). British Warships in the Age of Sail 1603–1714: design, construction, careers and fates. Barnsley, UK: Seaforth Publishing. ISBN 978-1-84832-040-6.
