= English ship Nantwich =

Ship of the line of the Royal Navy

History

England
- Name: Nantwich
- Namesake: Battle of Nantwich; Declaration of Breda
- Builder: Baylie, Bristol
- Launched: 1654
- Renamed: HMS Breda, 1660
- Fate: Wrecked, 1666

General characteristics
- Class & type: Fourth Rate frigate
- Tons burthen: 511
- Length: 100 ft (30.5 m) (keel)
- Beam: 31 ft (9.4 m)
- Depth of hold: 12 ft 8 in (3.9 m)
- Propulsion: Sails
- Sail plan: Full-rigged ship
- Armament: 40 guns of various weights of shot

The Nantwich was a 40-gun Fourth rate frigate of the English Royal Navy, originally built for the navy of the Commonwealth of England at Bristol by Francis Baylie, and launched in 1654.

After the Restoration in 1660, she was renamed HMS Breda. She was wrecked in 1666.
