= English ship Bridgewater (1654) =

Ship of the line of the Royal Navy

History

England
- Name: Bridgewater
- Namesake: Siege of Bridgwater (1645); Anne, Duchess of York
- Ordered: December 1652
- Builder: Chamberlain, Deptford Dockyard
- Launched: December 1653
- Renamed: HMS Anne, June 1660
- Fate: Accidentally blown up, 1673

General characteristics
- Class & type: Speaker-class frigate
- Tons burthen: 74269/94 bm
- Length: 116 ft 9 in (35.6 m) (keel)
- Beam: 34 ft 7 in (10.5 m)
- Depth of hold: 14 ft 2 in (4.3 m)
- Propulsion: Sails
- Sail plan: Full-rigged ship
- Armament: 52 guns of various weights of shot

The Bridgewater was a 52-gun third rate Speaker-class frigate built for the navy of the Commonwealth of England at Deptford Dockyard, and launched in December 1653.

After the Restoration in 1660, the Bridgewater was taken into the new Royal Navy, and her name was changed to HMS Anne, renamed after Anne Hyde, the wife of James, Duke of York. During the Second Anglo-Dutch War, she took part in the Battle of Lowestoft on 3 June 1665, the Four Days' Battle on 1-4 June 1666, and the St James's Day Fight on 25 July 1666. Her reconstruction was carried out during the second Dutch war by Christopher Pett in Woolwich.

During the Third Anglo-Dutch War she took part in the Battle of Solebay on 28 May 1672, the two Battles of Schooneveld on 28 May and 4 June 1673, and the Battle of Texel on 11 August 1673. The ship was accidentally blown up at Sheerness on 2 December 1673.
