= English ship Newbury (1654) =

Ship of the line of the Royal Navy

History

England
- Name: Newbury
- Namesake: First Battle of Newbury
- Ordered: December 1652
- Builder: Matthew Graves, Limehouse
- Launched: 3 June 1654
- Renamed: HMS Revenge, 1660
- Fate: Condemned, 19 September 1678

General characteristics
- Class & type: Speaker-class frigate
- Tons burthen: 76559/94 bm
- Length: 117 ft 6 in (35.8 m) (keel)
- Beam: 35 ft (10.7 m)
- Depth of hold: 14 ft 5 in (4.4 m)
- Propulsion: Sails
- Sail plan: Full-rigged ship
- Armament: 52 guns (at launch); 62 guns (1677)

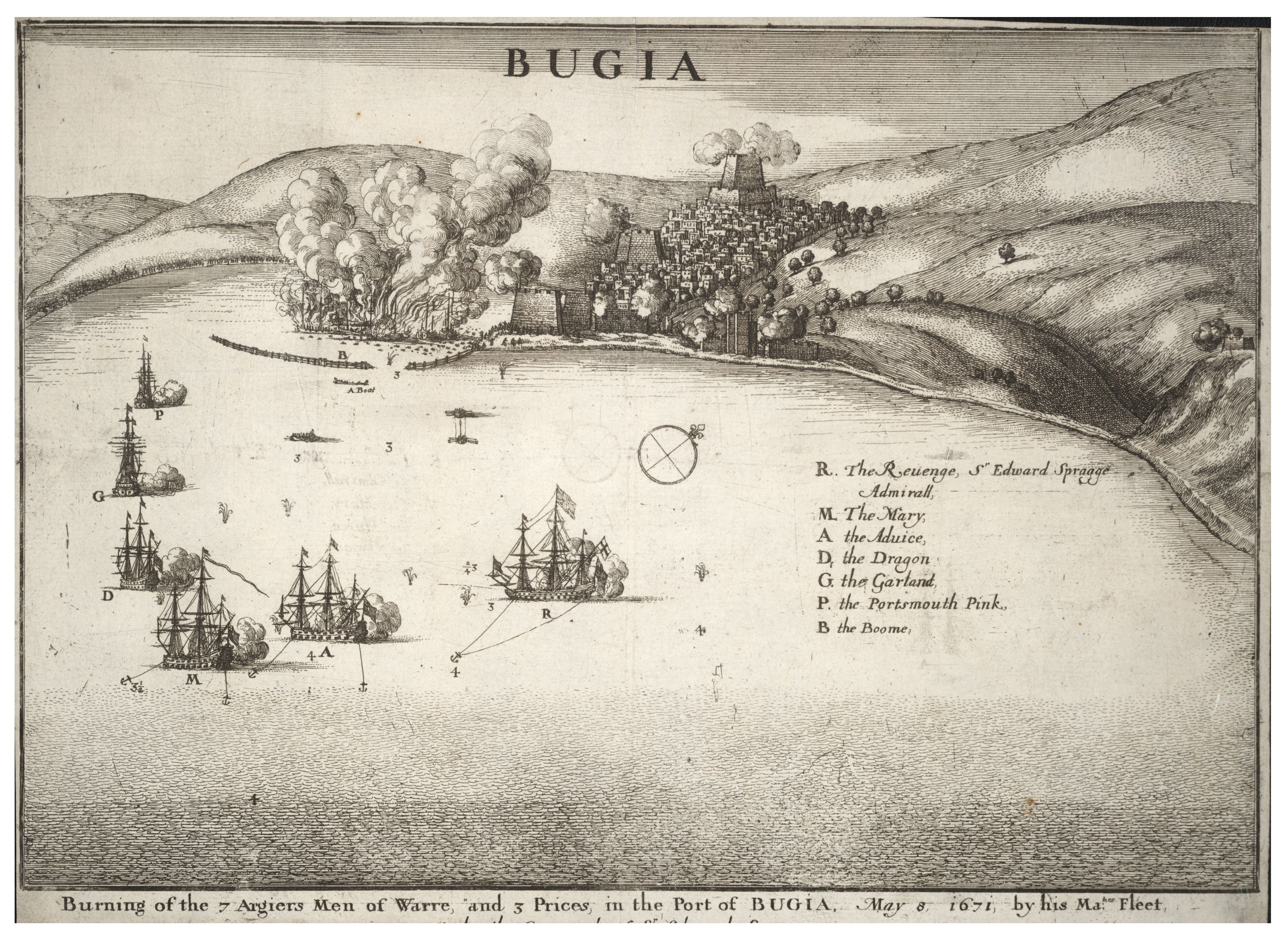
Revenge at the Battle of Bugia, 8 May 1671

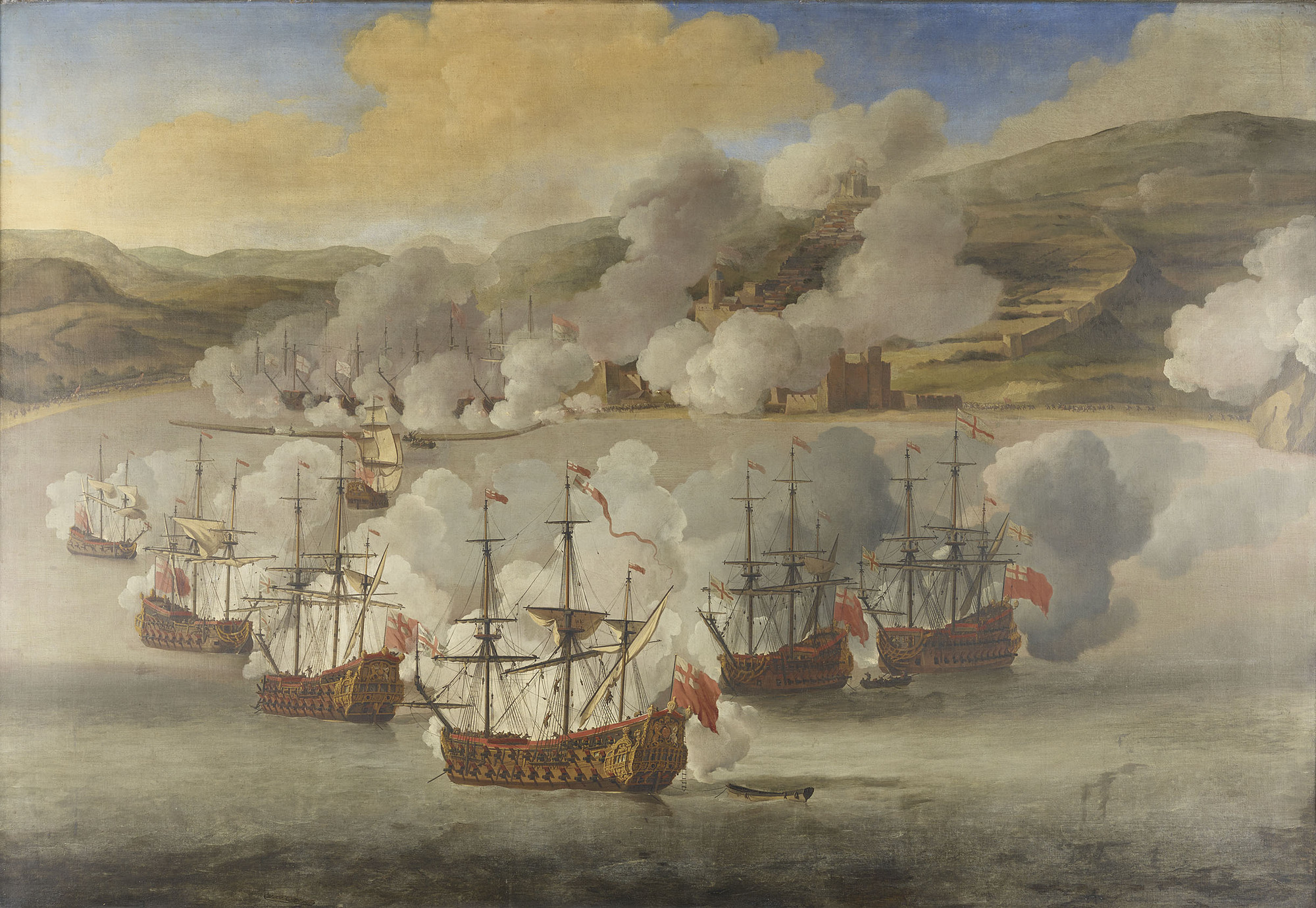
Attack on Shipping in Bugia, 8 May 1671

Newbury was a 52-gun third rate Speaker-class frigate built for the navy of the Commonwealth of England at Limehouse, and launched in 1654. She was named for the Parliamentarian victories at the two battles of Newbury. During the war against Spain, she took part in Blake's fleet in the Battle of Santa Cruz de Tenerife (1657).

After the Restoration in 1660, she was taken into the new Royal Navy and renamed HMS Revenge. She spent some time carrying the flag of the senior captain of Prince Rupert's white (van) squadron, commanded by Robert Holmes. By 1665 her ordnance was officially 58 guns, but in war she actually carried 69, comprising 22 demi-cannon, 4 culverins, 30 demi-culverins, and 10 sakers, plus 2 3-pounders and a solitary falcon on the poop.

During the Second Anglo-Dutch War, she took part in the Battle of Lowestoft and the Battle of Vagen in 1665, as flagship of Rear-Admiral Sir Thomas Teddeman; in 1666 she took part in the Four Days' Battle and the St James's Day Fight. On 8 May 1671 she destroyed seven Algerine warships in the Battle of Bugia Bay. In the Third Anglo-Dutch War she participated in the two Battles of Schooneveld. By 1677 her armament had been altered to 62 guns, comprising 24 24-pounders, 24 demi-culverins, 12 sakers and 2 3-pounders. However, she was condemned in 1678, and presumably broken up.
