= Claire Jowitt =

English academic

Claire Elaine Jowitt is an English academic who writes on race, cross-gender, piracy, identity, empire and performance. She is currently a Professor in English and History within the Schools of History and Literature, Drama and Creative Writing at the University of East Anglia. Previously, she held a personal chair in English at Southampton University (2012-2015), was Professor of Renaissance English Literature at Nottingham Trent University (2005–12) and Lecturer and Senior Lecturer at Aberystwyth University (1996–2005).

== Research ==
Her work on the representation of outsiders such as Jews, Turks and pirates in Renaissance literature and culture has cast light on the complex and contradictory nature of contemporary attitudes to "others". She argues that allegorical allusions to domestic English political issues are important as well as the dominant view that literary representations played an important role in the shaping of a national consciousness. Her examination of two early modern English "Turk" plays, Lust's Dominion and The Turke, notes the insight they provide to the domestic concerns of the culture they were produced within, including their negative depiction of Islamic men and their contribution to contemporary anti-Muslim sentiment.

Likewise, in her analysis of the development of the pirate romance in the late-16th and early-17th centuries, Jowitt notes the ambivalence of attitudes to the ideology and practice of piracy — maritime violence — in an England that was becoming known internationally as a "nation of pirates". She describes how the portrayal of piracy in the contemporary literature became an index for other domestic concerns. She suggests that the depiction of pirates in Sir Philip Sydney's New Arcadia — in some respects acting little differently from any group of fighting men — may reflect the ambivalence of English attitudes of the time towards "men of action" like Sir Francis Drake. For the character Prince Musidorus, piracy and pirates are not condemned outright – if they can be serviceable to his cause, and are successful, then he supports them, in the same flexible way as Queen Elizabeth gave semi-official support to the "patriotic violence" of Drake and Hawkins.

=== Hakluyt Editorial Project ===
In May 2008, a major interdisciplinary conference entitled Richard Hakluyt 1552–1616: Life, Times, Legacy was convened by Jowitt and several colleagues, jointly organised by the National Maritime Museum, the Centre for Travel Writing Studies, Nottingham Trent University and the National University of Ireland, Galway. This meeting examined the significance of the works of the 16th century English writer Richard Hakluyt (1553—1616), best known for his promotion of English settlement of North America. A major aim of the conference was to bring together a network of scholars to prepare a new edition of Hakluyt's Principal Navigations, and a project was subsequently established to produce a multi-volume critical edition on this work. In parallel, Jowitt co-edited a collection of 24 essays on Richard Hakluyt that was published in 2012.

== Professional recognition ==
From 2005–2008, Jowitt was Honorary Secretary of the Society for Renaissance Studies. In 2008, she was elected a Fellow of The English Association. In 2011, Jowitt received an Institute of Historical Research Scouloudi Historical Award for the publication of "Richard Hakluyt and Travel Writing in Early Modern Europe". The Culture of Piracy 1580–1630: English Literature and Seaborne Crime was awarded the 2012 European Society for the Study of English (ESSE) Book Award, Honorable Mention, Literatures in the English Language (established authors).

== Books ==
- 2002, with Watt, D., eds. The arts of seventeenth-century science: representations of the natural world in European and North American culture. Aldershot : Ashgate Press.
- 2003. Voyage drama and gender politics 1589–1642: real and imagined worlds . Manchester : Manchester University Press.
- 2006. Pirates? The politics of plunder, 1550–1650. Basingstoke : Palgrave.
- 2010. The culture of piracy 1580–1630: English literature and Seaborne crime. Farnham : Ashgate Press.
- 2012, with Carey, D., eds. Richard Hakluyt and Travel Writing in Early Modern Europe. Farnham : Ashgate Press.

== Other publications ==
- 2010, Renaissance Pirates, BBC History Magazine, July Vol 11, No. 7
- Jowitt, Claire (10 June 2022). "The Last Voyage of the Gloucester (1682): The Politics of a Royal Shipwreck". The English Historical Review. 137 (586): 728–762. doi:10.1093/ehr/ceac127.
