= English ship Fairfax (1650) =

Naval frigate of the Commonwealth of England

History

England
- Name: Fairfax
- Namesake: Thomas Fairfax
- Builder: Peter Pett, Deptford
- Launched: 1650
- Fate: Accidentally burnt, 1653

General characteristics
- Class & type: Speaker-class frigate
- Tons burthen: 7458/94 (bm)
- Length: 116 ft (35.4 m) (keel)
- Beam: 34 ft 9 in (10.6 m)
- Draught: 17 ft 6 in (5.33 m)
- Depth of hold: 14 ft 4 in (4.4 m)
- Sail plan: Full-rigged ship
- Complement: 260 from 1605 to 1652; 300 in 1653
- Armament: 52 guns of various weights of shot

Fairfax was a 52-gun third-rate Speaker-class frigate of the Commonwealth of England, built by Peter Pett at Deptford Dockyard and in service from 1650 to 1653.

== Naval service ==
Fairfax was commissioned in 1650 under Captain William Penn, then serving as Commonwealth's Vice Admiral for the Irish coast. In mid-1650 she saw action against French ships in the English Channel. Later that year her command was transferred to Captain John Lawson.

In 1651, Captain Penn was assigned to the role of Admiral in the Mediterranean, and chose Fairfax as his flagship. After an uneventful year of service, command was again transferred to Captain Lawson, under whose direction Fairfax participated in the Battle of Dover, and the Battle of Portland in the following year.

On 18 February 1653, Fairfax was accidentally set alight and burned beyond repair at Chatham Dockyard.
