= HMS York (1660) =

Ship of the line of the Royal Navy

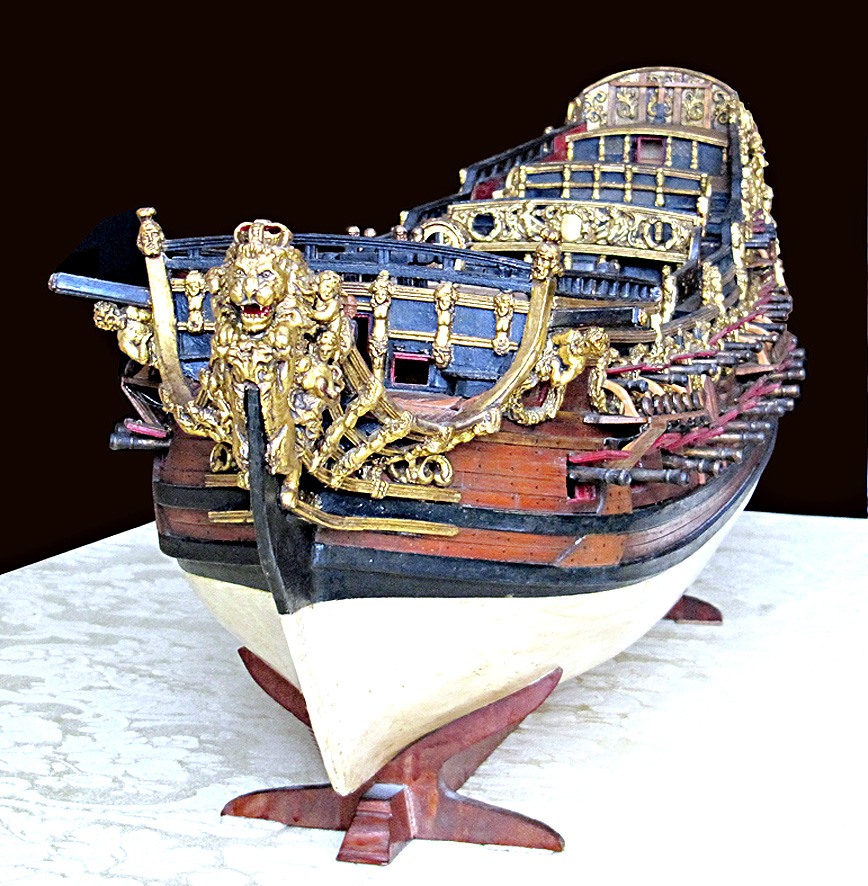
- HMS York

History

England
- Name: Marston Moor
- Namesake: Battle of Marston Moor
- Ordered: December 1652
- Builder: Henry Johnson, Blackwall Yard
- Launched: November 1653
- Renamed: HMS York, 1660
- Fate: Wrecked, 1703

General characteristics
- Class & type: Speaker-class frigate
- Tons burthen: 73438/94 bm
- Length: 116 ft (35.4 m) (keel)
- Beam: 34 ft 6 in (10.5 m)
- Depth of hold: 14 ft 2 in (4.3 m)
- Propulsion: Sails
- Sail plan: Full-rigged ship
- Armament: 52 guns (at launch); 60 guns (1677)

The Marston Moor was a 52-gun third rate Speaker-class frigate built for the navy of the Commonwealth of England at Henry Johnson's Blackwall Yard, and launched in November 1653. She was named for the Parliamentary victory over the Royalists at Marston Moor on 2 July 1644. She was one of new thirty frigates authorised by the Parliament on 28 September 1652, following the outbreak of the First Anglo-Dutch War in July. Nine of these were Third rates of 52 guns. The Marston Moor had 13 pairs of gunports on the lower deck, 12 pairs on the upper deck, and 4 pairs on the quarterdeck; unusually, she had an additional pair on the poop.

After the Restoration in 1660, she was taken into the new Royal Navy and renamed HMS York in honour of the King's brother James, Duke of York, whom Charles II appointed as Lord High Admiral in June 1660. By 1665 her armament had been increased to 58 guns, comprising 20 demi-cannon and 4 culverins on the lower deck, 32 demi-culverins on the upper deck and quarterdeck, and 2 sakers on the poop. The York took part in the major battles of the Second Anglo-Dutch War, in the Battle of Lowestoft on 3 June 1665, the Four Days' Battle on 1–4 June 1666 and the St James's Day Fight on 25 July 1666. was wrecked in 1703. During the Third Anglo-Dutch War she participated in the Battle of Solebay on 28 May 1672, the two Battles of Schooneveld on 28 May and 4 June 1673, and the Battle of Texel on 11 August 1673.

Following the Glorious Revolution in 1688, the York took part in the Battle of Bantry Bay on 1 May 1689, and in the Battle of Beachy Head on 30 June 1690. In 1695-96 she was reduced to a Fourth rate. She was wrecked on the Shipwash Sand off Harwich on 22 November 1703.
