= English ship Essex (1653) =

History

England
- Name: Essex
- Namesake: Robert Devereux, 3rd Earl of Essex
- Ordered: 1 April 1652
- Builder: Phineas Pett II, Deptford Dockyard
- Launched: 18 April 1653
- Captured: 4 June 1666 (O.S.), by the Dutch
- Notes: Participated in: Battle of the Gabbard (1653); Battle of Lowestoft (1665); Four Days Battle (1666)

United Dutch Provinces
- Acquired: 14 June 1666 (N.S.)
- Commissioned: 1666
- Fate: Wrecked October 1667

General characteristics
- Class & type: Third rate frigate
- Tons burthen: 65271/94 (bm)
- Length: 118 ft (36.0 m) (keel)
- Beam: 32 ft 3 in (9.8 m)
- Depth of hold: 14 ft (4.3 m)
- Propulsion: Sails
- Sail plan: Full-rigged ship
- Armament: 48 guns (at launch); 60 guns (1666)

Essex was a 48-gun third rate frigate built for the navy of the Commonwealth of England by Phineas Pett II at Deptford Dockyard under the Early 1652 Shipbuilding Programme, and launched on 18 April 1653. She had 13 pairs of gunports on the lower deck, 12 pairs on the upper deck, and 3 pairs on the quarterdeck. During the First Anglo-Dutch War, she took part in the Battle of the Gabbard on 3 June 1653 as the flagship of General-at-Sea Sir Robert Blake.

Following the restoration of the English monarchy in 1660, she was commissioned into the Royal Navy as HMS Essex. She took part in the Battle of Lowestoft on 3 June 1665. Between 1 June and 4 June (by the Julian Calendar) 1666 Essex fought at the Four Days Battle. By the time of the battle, Essex's armament had been increased to 56 guns, comprising 12 demi-cannon and 12 culverins on the lower deck, 28 demi-culverins and 4 sakers. On the final day of the engagement, she was captured by the Dutch. She was taken into the Texel, repaired and added to the Amsterdam Admiralty's navy as a ship of 50 guns, but was wrecked off Vlieland in October 1667 with great loss of life.
