= English ship Langport =

Ship of the line of the Royal Navy

History

England
- Name: Langport
- Namesake: Battle of Langport (1645), Henrietta, Queen Consort
- Ordered: December 1652
- Builder: William Bright, Horsleydown
- Launched: 1654
- Renamed: HMS Henrietta, 1660
- Fate: Wrecked, 25 December 1689

General characteristics
- Class & type: Speaker-class frigate
- Tons burthen: 78124/94 bm
- Length: 116 ft (35.4 m) (keel)
- Beam: 35 ft 7 in (10.8 m)
- Depth of hold: 14 ft 4 in (4.4 m)
- Propulsion: Sails
- Sail plan: Full-rigged ship
- Armament: 52 guns (at launch); 62 guns (1677)

The Langport was a 52-gun third rate Speaker-class frigate ordered in December 1652 for the navy of the Commonwealth of England and built by shipbuilder William Bright at Horsleydown, Bermondsey, London. She was launched in 1654, and named for the Parliamentary victory at the Battle of Langport in 1645. She took part in the Battle of Santa Cruz de Tenerife on 20 April 1657.

After the Restoration in 1660, the Langport was taken into the new Royal Navy, and renamed HMS Henrietta after the Queen Consort. By 1666 her armament had officially risen to 58 guns, comprising 20 demi-cannon, 4 culverins, 26 12-pounders and 8 demi-culverins; however, she actually carried 22 demi-cannon, 4 culverins, 37 demi-culverins and 2 sakers. During the Second Anglo-Dutch War the Henrietta took part in the Battle of Lowestoft in 1665, and in the Four Days' Battle and the St James's Day Fight in 1666. Post-war she was reduced to 60 guns, although by 1673 this has become 62 guns. In the Third Anglo-Dutch War she fought in both Battles of Schooneveld and in the Battle of Texel during 1673.

The Henrietta was wrecked during a storm in the Cattewater in Plymouth Sound on Christmas Day of 1689.
