= HMS Montagu (1660) =

Ship of the line of the Royal Navy

History

England
- Name: Lyme
- Namesake: Siege of Lyme Regis; Edward Montagu, 1st Baron Montagu of Boughton
- Builder: John Tippetts, Portsmouth
- Launched: 4 September 1654
- Renamed: HMS Montagu, 1660
- Fate: Broken up, 1749

General characteristics as built
- Class & type: Speaker-class frigate
- Tons burthen: 76960/94 bm
- Length: 145 ft (44.2 m) (on the gundeck), 117 ft (35.7 m) (keel)
- Beam: 35 ft 2 in (10.7 m)
- Depth of hold: 15 ft (4.6 m)
- Propulsion: Sails
- Sail plan: Full-rigged ship
- Armament: 52 guns (at launch); 62 guns (1677)

General characteristics after 1672–74 rebuild
- Class & type: 60-gun fourth rate ship of the line
- Tons burthen: 82911/94 bm
- Length: 145 ft 0 in (44.2 m) (on gundeck), 117 ft 0 in (35.7 m) (keel)
- Beam: 36 ft 6 in (11.1 m)
- Depth of hold: 15 ft 0 in (4.6 m)
- Propulsion: Sails
- Sail plan: Full-rigged ship
- Complement: 355
- Armament: 62 guns of various weights of shot

General characteristics after 1698 rebuild
- Class & type: 60-gun fourth rate ship of the line
- Tons burthen: 90557/94 bm
- Length: 143 ft 10 in (43.8 m) (gundeck), 120 ft 0 in (36.6 m) (keel)
- Beam: 37 ft 8 in (11.5 m)
- Depth of hold: 15 ft 4 in (4.7 m)
- Propulsion: Sails
- Sail plan: Full-rigged ship
- Armament: 60 guns of various weights of shot

General characteristics after 1714–16 rebuild
- Class & type: 1706 Establishment 60-gun fourth rate ship of the line
- Tons burthen: 9204/94 bm
- Length: 144 ft 3 in (44.0 m) (gundeck), 119 ft (36.3 m) (keel)
- Beam: 38 ft (11.6 m)
- Depth of hold: 15 ft 8 in (4.8 m)
- Propulsion: Sails
- Sail plan: Full-rigged ship
- Armament: 60 guns: Gundeck: 24 × 24 pdrs; Upper gundeck: 26 × 9 pdrs; Quarterdeck: 8 × 6 pdrs; Forecastle: 2 × 6 pdrs

The Lyme was a 52-gun third rate Speaker-class frigate built for the navy of the Commonwealth of England by Master Shipwright John Tippetts at Portsmouth Dockyard, and launched on 4 September 1654.

After the Restoration in 1660 she was taken into the new Royal Navy and renamed HMS Montagu in honour of Edward Montagu, 1st Baron Montagu of Boughton, who died in 1644 after being imprisoned for supporting King Charles I. By 1665 she carried 58 guns, comprising 20 demi-cannon, 4 culverins and 32 demi-culverins, with 2 small falcons on the poop. She took part in the Battle of Lowestoft in 1665 and the St James's Day Fight in 1666. She was rebuilt and girdled (widened) by Master Shipwright Sir Phineas Pett at Chatham Dockyard in 1672–74 (an extra layer of timbers added to her sides) to improve her stability.

During the Nine Years' War against France, the Montagu took part in the Battle of Barfleur in May 1692. She underwent her second rebuild in 1698 by Master Shipwright Fisher Harding at Woolwich Dockyard, reduced to the Fourth rate as a 60-gun ship of the line. She participated in the Battle of Velez Malaga on 13 August 1704 during the War of the Spanish Succession.

Her third rebuild took place at Portsmouth Dockyard, where Master Shipwright Richard Stacey was ordered in July 1714 to rebuild her and from where she was relaunched on 26 July 1716 as a 60-gun fourth rate to the 1706 Establishment. She fought at the Battle of Cape Passaro on 11 August 1718. After a Great Repair at Portsmouth in 1739–40, she was recommissioned for the West Indies in 1740 and took part in the operations at Cartagena in 1741 and at Porto Bello in 1742.

The Montagu was ordered to be broken up by Admiralty Order of 3 January 1749, and this was completed at Portsmouth by 19 September 1749.
