= HMS Dreadnought (1660) =

Ship of the line of the Royal Navy

History

England
- Name: Torrington
- Namesake: Battle of Torrington, 1646
- Ordered: December 1652
- Builder: Henry Johnson, Blackwall Yard
- Launched: early 1654
- Renamed: Dreadnought, 1660
- Fate: Foundered 16 October 1690

General characteristics
- Class & type: Speaker-class frigate
- Tons burthen: 73438/94 (bm)
- Length: 116 ft 0 in (35.4 m) (keel)
- Beam: 34 ft 6 in (10.5 m)
- Depth of hold: 14 ft 2 in (4.3 m)
- Sail plan: Full-rigged ship
- Armament: 52 guns (at launch); 62 guns (1677)

The English ship Torrington was a 52-gun frigate (later classed as a third-rate ship of the line, ordered in December 1652 as one of nine ships under the Late 1652 Programme for the navy of the Commonwealth of England following the outbreak of the First Anglo-Dutch War. Her builder was shipwright Henry Johnson at his Blackwall Yard, London. She had 13 pairs of gunports on the lower deck, 12 pairs on the upper deck, and 5 pairs on the quarterdeck. She was named for the Parliamentarian victory at the Battle of Torrington in 1646.

Following the Stuart Restoration in 1660 she was taken into the new Royal Navy and renamed HMS Dreadnought. By 1666 her armament had been increased to 58 guns officially, but in practice she carried 66, comprising 22 demi-cannon, 6 culverins, and 36 demi-culverins, together with one pair of (3-pounder) falcons. By 1677 this had been reduced to 62 guns, comprising 24 24-pounders (replacing the demi-cannon), 24 demi-culverins, 12 sakers and 2 3-pounders.

During the Second Anglo-Dutch War, she took part in the Battle of Lowestoft in 1665, and the Four Days' Battle and St James's Day Fight in 1666. In the Third Anglo-Dutch War, she took part in the Battle of Solebay in 1672, and in both Battles of Schooneveld and the Battle of Texel in 1673. After an active career in both the Second Dutch War and Third Dutch War, Dreadnought foundered at sea off the North Foreland on 16 October 1690.
