= English ship Preston (1653) =

Ship of the line of the Royal Navy

History

England
- Name: Preston
- Builder: Carey, Woodbridge
- Launched: 1653
- Renamed: Antelope, 1660
- Fate: Sold, 1693

General characteristics
- Class & type: Fourth-rate frigate
- Tons burthen: 516 bm
- Length: 101 ft (30.8 m) (keel)
- Beam: 31 ft (9.4 m)
- Depth of hold: 13 ft (4.0 m)
- Sail plan: Full-rigged ship
- Armament: 40 guns (1660); 48 guns (1677)

The Preston was a 40-gun fourth-rate frigate of the English Royal Navy, originally built for the navy of the Commonwealth of England at Woodbridge, and launched in 1653.

After the Restoration of the monarchy in 1660, her name was changed to Antelope. By 1677 her armament had been increased to 48 guns.

In 1681 James Story, captain of Antelope, conducted a census of the Avalon colony (now Ferryland, Newfoundland) and on 1 September 1681, wrote An Account of what fishing Ships, Sack Ships, Planters and Boatkeepers from Trepassey to Bonavista...

Antelope was sold out of the navy in 1693.
