= John Berry (Royal Navy officer) =

17th-century English rear admiral

Vice-Admiral Sir John Berry
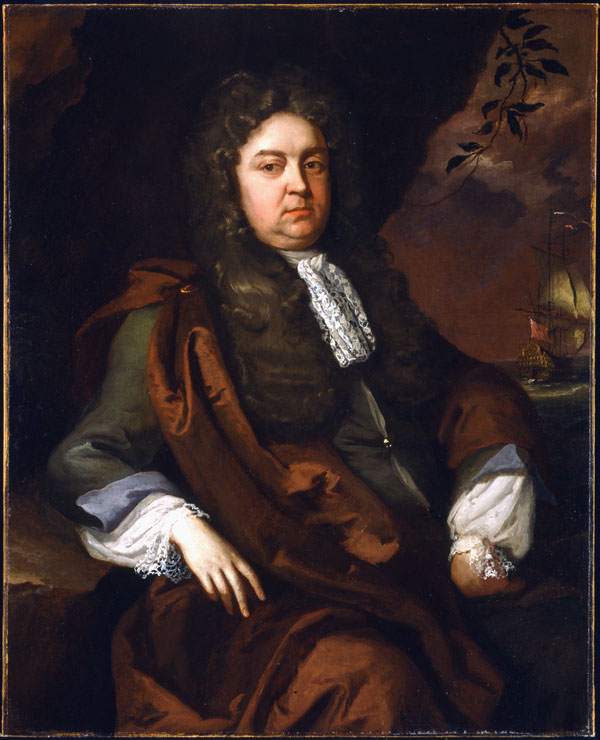
- Portrait by Michael Dahl (c. 1689)

Captain of Deal Castle
- In office from June 1674 – 1690
- Preceded by: Francis Hawley, 1st Baron Hawley
- Succeeded by: John Granville, 1st Baron Granville of Potheridge

Personal details
- Born: baptised 7 January 1635 Knowstone, Devon, England
- Died: 14 February 1690 Portsmouth, England
- Resting place: St Dunstan's Church, Stepney
- Spouse: Rebecca Ventris
- Children: none
- Parents: Daniel Berry; Elizabeth Moore
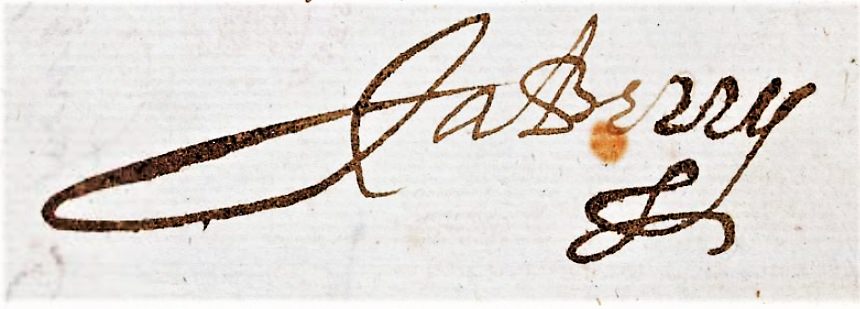
- Signature

Military service
- Allegiance: England
- Branch/service: Royal Navy
- Years of service: 1665 – 1689
- Rank: Vice-Admiral
- Battles/wars: Nevis (20 May 1667); Solebay (28 May 1672)

Vice-Admiral Sir John Berry (c. 1636 – 14 February 1690) was an English officer of the Royal Navy.

== Origins and early years ==
John Berry was born at Knowstone, in the English county of Devon. He was the second of seven sons of Daniel Berry, the vicar of Knowstone cum Molland by his wife Elizabeth Moore, daughter of Sir John Moore of Moor Hayes, Devon. Daniel Berry held the benefice, which he had inherited from his own father, but had been deprived of his position during the English Civil War.

The Berry family was established during the reign of Edward I of England. The family name was derived from their manor of Nerbert or Narbor (modern Berrynarbor) near the Devon coast.

The Civil War saw the family's finances ruined, as Daniel Berry had been committed to the Royalist cause. After his father's death in 1652, John Berry and his elder brother joined the merchant service.

== Naval career ==
=== Commands ===
- Swallow (7 October.1665 to 6 February 1665/66)
- Guinea (16 August to 1 November 1666)
- Coronation (1667)
- Pearl (11 November 1668 to 12 January 1670)
- Nonsuch (13 January 1670 to 10 July 1671)
- Dover (1 September 1671 to 8 April 1672)
- Resolution;(11 April 1672 to 3 April 1674) First Battle of Schooneveld (28 May 1673)
- Swallow (9 March 1674/5 to 28 April 1675)
- Bristol (28 April 1675 to 7 January 1677/78)
- Dreadnought (7 January 1677/78 to 21 August 1679)
- Leopard (28 January 1679/80 to 20 April 1681)
- Gloucester (8.April 1682 to 6.May 1682)
- Henrietta (15 June 1682 to 18 April 1684)
- Elizabeth (1688 to 1689) Battle of Bantry Bay (1 May 1689)

=== Early career ===
By 1663 Berry had joined the Royal Navy as the boatswain of the ketch HMS Swallow, which was operating in the West Indies. When the captain of Swallow was promoted in 1665, Berry succeeded him, gaining his first command on 17 Sept. 1665. Upon his return to England in 1666. George Monck, the Duke of Albemarle gave him commissions for the Little Mary in February, and HMS Guinea on 16 August, a command he retained until 1 November. In the summer of 1666 he had overall responsibility for the smaller vessels attending the fleet.

=== Nevis (1667) ===
The Dutch and the French were threatening English possessions in the West Indies, and the island of Nevis seemed next to fall. In April 1667, Berry, in the Coronation, a 56-gun hired man-of-war, arrived at Barbados from England. Merchant ships were bought and adapted for service, and 10 vessels and a fireship were made ready. Berry was given overall command of the squadron by the governor of Barbados, Lord Willoughby. The French and Dutch possibly collected 20 men-of-war and other vessels at Saint Kitts.

Berry blockaded the allied fleet as they were preparing to themselves attack the English, and on 20 May 1667 the French and the Dutch were defeated in an engagement that lasted for many hours. He successfully forced them to retreat, the French departing for Martinique, and the Dutch for Virginia. The English victory at the Battle of Nevis enabled the Royal Navy to regain Antigua and Montserrat.

=== Newfoundland ===
In 1675, Berry was captain of the annual Newfoundland convoy. The permanent settlers there had been ordered to remove themselves to other colonies in America or be forcibly removed to England. As captain of the annual convoy, Berry was the representative of royal authority in the island and it was his duty to inform the settlers of this decision. Berry reported that the colonists were being unjustly treated. His attempts to present their case in a favourable light and his views ultimately resulted in the settlers becoming permanently established on the island, and British policy being reversed.

=== Virginia (1677) ===
Berry took HMS Bristol to the Mediterranean in 1675–1676, taking her to Virginia in January 1677 to deal with Bacon's Rebellion. The rebels had already been dealt with, and Berry instead became involved in the aftermath of the rebellion, dealing with disputes that had arisen between the leaders in Virginia.

=== Tangier ===
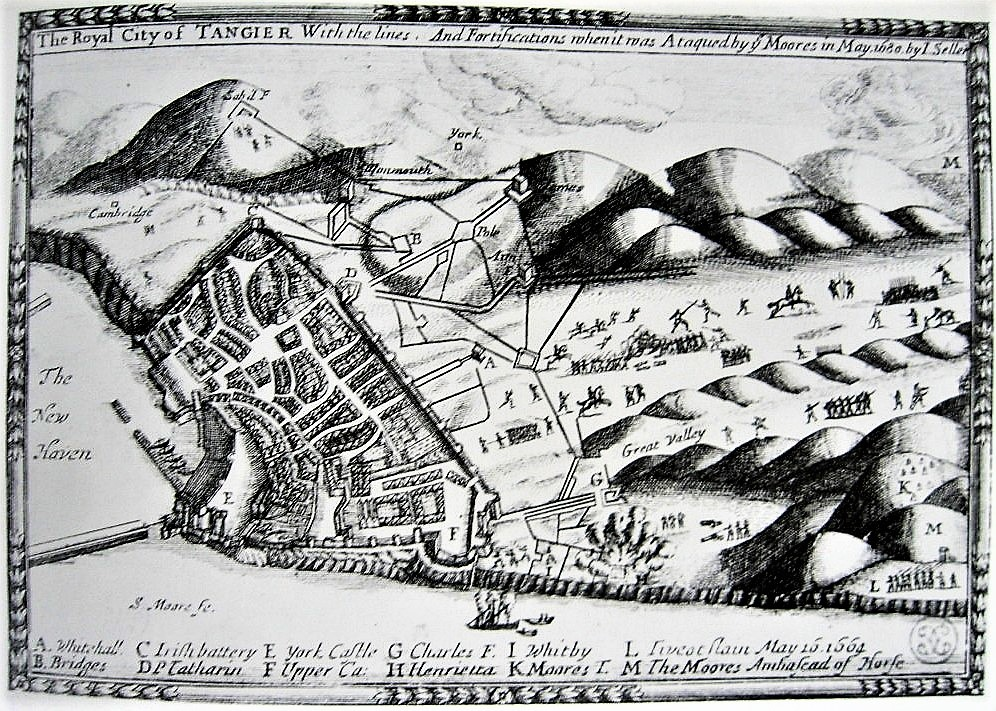
An etching by S Moore after I Seller (1680) The Royal City of Tangier with the lines and fortifications when it was ataqued by ye Moores in May, 1680 (National Army Museum)

By 1680 Charles II had threatened to give up Tangier, which was costly for parliament to maintain and difficult to defend, as in order to protect the town and harbour from attack, the perimeter had to be increased. A number of outworks were built, but a siege in 1680 showed that they could be successfully overcome. In 1683, Charles gave Admiral Lord Dartmouth secret orders to abandon Tangier. Dartmouth was to level the fortifications, destroy the harbour, and evacuate the troops. That August, Dartmouth sailed from Plymouth. The forts and walls were mined, and on 5 February 1684, Tangier was evacuated, leaving the town in ruins.

In 1683, after Berry was appointed to command HMS Henrietta, a 50-gun third rate Speaker-class frigate, he became the vice-admiral of the fleet sent to the Mediterranean to evacuate the garrison and destroy the harbour and defensive works.

=== Sinking of HMS Gloucester (1682) ===
In April 1682, HMS Gloucester was due to be deployed, along with five other ships, to Tangier via Ireland, when Berry was appointed to command the ship, and was assigned to transport the Duke of York (the future King James II of England) and his party from Sheerness to Leith. James intended to settle his affairs as Lord High Commissioner to the Parliament of Scotland, and collect his pregnant wife Mary of Modena (along with his daughter Anne from his previous marriage), before returning from Edinburgh to London and taking up residence at his brother Charles’s court.

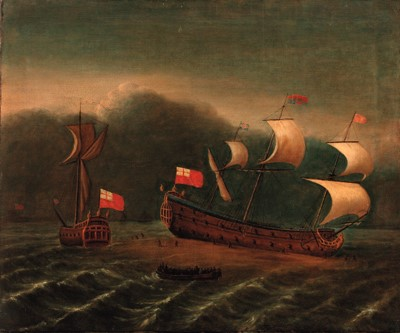
Isaac Sailmaker (undated), HMS Gloucester aground off Great Yarmouth on 6 May 1682

Gloucester, together with the Ruby, Happy Return, Lark, Dartmouth and Pearl, and the royal yachts Mary, Katherine, Charlotte and Kitchen, convened on 3 May. The fleet left the Kent coast the following day, watched by Charles and members of the royal court. Bad weather forced the Gloucester to moor up during the first night. As a signal for the fleet to drop anchor, she fired a gun, but three ships, misinterpreting the signal, sailed out to sea, and never re-joined the fleet. On the second evening, a dispute arose between James, several officers, and the ship's pilot, about the correct course to take. James settled the matter when he decided upon a middle course. On the night of 5/6 May 1682, Gloucester struck the Leman and Ower sandbank at low tide, about 45 kilometres (28 mi) off Great Yarmouth. Less than an hour later, she sank.

Partly through Berry's efforts and determination to stay with his ship until the end, the ship's boats were lowered down, enabling the Duke of York and some of his courtiers and advisors to reach the safety of the other ships. Boats managed to rescue more people, and many were saved, but between 130 and 250 sailors and passengers lost their lives. Berry wrote a detailed account of the disaster soon afterwards.

== Other posts ==
Berry was from 1684 on service as a Navy commissioner. He was governor of Deal Castle from June 1674, and became a commissioner for Virginia in 1677.

== Glorious Revolution ==
In 1688, after the defection of Lord Dartmouth, Berry commanded the fleet deployed against William of Orange when he moved against the Stuart king, James II.

== Marriage ==
Berry married Rebecca Ventris of Granhams, Great Shelford, Cambridgeshire, as identified from the arms of Ventris shown on her monument in a church in Stepney. She may have been a sister of Sir Peyton Ventris, the eldest surviving son of the barrister Edward Ventris. The marriage was without progeny.

== Final years ==
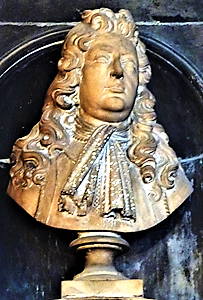
Bust of Berry from his mural monument in St Dunstan, Stepney

Berry was placed in command at Sheerness Dockyard over the winter of 1688–1689, but ill health had forced him to retire by 1689.

Berry died at Portsmouth on 14 February 1690, and was buried at St Dunstan's, Stepney. He commissioned his own mural monument for the church, at a cost of £150. The inscription, in Latin, is translated as:

"Lest thou should not know, O reader, the famed Sir John Berry of Devon, with dignity of a knight, not just ruler of the sea (as well know too the Barbaries) having gained from King and Country well-deserved great glory on account of matters happily conducted, satiated with the glory of fame, after many victories brought home, as with others, was not able to defeat the Fates. He died 14 February 1689, was baptised 7 January 1635"

The monument survives, but no longer the pristine white of Prince's description but covered with a yellowish-brown patina. No trace survives of the arms described by Prince. His will, dated 2 February 1688, mentions his wife Rebecca, who married 10 months after Berry's death.

== Sources ==
- Clowes, William Laird (1898). The Royal Navy: a history from the earliest times to the present. Vol. 2. London: S. Low, Marston. OCLC 1068591319.
- Davies, J.D. (2008). "Berry, Sir John". Oxford Dictionary of National Biography (online ed.). Oxford: Oxford University Press. doi:10.1093/ref:odnb/2265. OCLC 56568095. (Subscription, Wikipedia Library access or UK public library membership required.)
- Jowitt, Claire (2022). "The Last Voyage of the Gloucester (1682): The Politics of a Royal Shipwreck". The English Historical Review. 137 (586): 728–762. doi:10.1093/ehr/ceac127.
- Pickford, Nigel (2021). Samuel Pepys and the Strange Wrecking of the Gloucester. Cheltenham, UK: The History Press. ISBN 978-07509-9-753-9.
- Prince, John (1810) [1701]. Danmonii orientales illustres: or, the worthies of Devon. London: Rees & Curtis. pp. 68–73. OCLC 1205281336.
- Risdon, Tristram (1811). The Chorographical Description Or Survey of the County of Devon. Plymouth, UK: Rees and Curtis. OCLC 1175977746.
- Rowe, C.M. (1966). Brown, George W. (ed.). Dictionary of Canadian Biography. Vol. 1: 1000 to 1700. Toronto: University of Toronto Press. pp. 92–93. ISSN 0070-4717. OCLC 848259390.
- Winfield, Rif (2010). British Warships in the Age of Sail 1603–1714: design, construction, careers and fates. Barnsley, UK: Seaforth Publishing. ISBN 978-1-84832-040-6.

=== Further reading ===
- Campbell, John (1817). "Memoirs of Sir John Berry, Knight, Rear-Admiral of England". Lives Of The British Admirals: containing an accurate naval history from the earliest periods. Vol. 3. London: C.J. Barrington; J. Harris. pp. 298–308. OCLC 931123401.
- Powley, Edward B. (2010) [1928]. The English Navy in the Revolution of 1688. Cambridge: Cambridge University Press. ISBN 978-05117-0-877-0.
- Singer, Samuel Weller, ed. (1828). "Narrative from Sir John Berry, Knight, Late Commander of His Majesty's Ship Gloucester, with an account of the winds and weather we had from the fifth to the sixth day of May, 1682, being the day the said ship was cast away on the west bank of the Lemon". The Correspondence of Henry Hyde, Earl of Clarendon, and his Brother Laurence Hyde, Earl of Rochester. Vol. 1. London: H. Colburn. pp. 67–73.
- Webb, Stephen Saunders (1979). The Governors-General: the English Army and the definition of the Empire, 1569–1681. Chapel Hill, North Carolina: University of North Carolina Press. ISBN 0807813311.
- Webb, Stephen Saunders (1998). Kneebone, John T.; Bearss, Sara B. (eds.). Dictionary of Virginia Biography. Vol. 1. Richmond, Virginia: Library of Virginia. pp. 461–462. ISBN 978-08849-0-189-1.
