= HMY William & Mary (1694) =

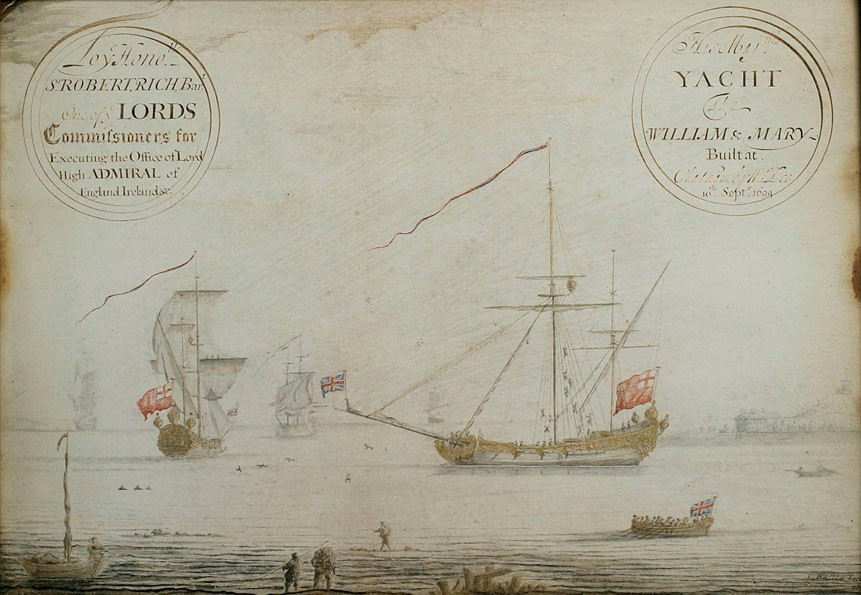
- His Majesty's Yacht WILLIAM & MARY by Thomas Baston 1696

History

Great Britain
- Name: William and Mary
- Namesake: William III and Mary II
- Ordered: February 1693
- Builder: Robert Lee, Chatham Dockyard
- Launched: September 1694
- Commissioned: 1695
- Decommissioned: 1800
- Refit: 1765
- Fate: Sold, 1801

General characteristics
- Type: Yacht
- Tons burthen: 152 18/94 (bm)
- Length: 76 ft 6 in (23.32 m) (overall); 61 ft 5 in (18.72 m) (keel)
- Beam: 21 ft 7 in (6.58 m)
- Depth: 9 ft 6 in (2.90 m)
- Sail plan: Ketch-rigged
- Complement: 1694: 1765:40
- Armament: 1694:8 × 3-pounder guns; 1765:10 × 2-pounder guns

HM Yacht William and Mary was a royal yacht of the Kingdom of Great Britain, named after the joint monarchs who ruled between 1689 and 1694. She was launched in 1694 and completely rebuilt in 1765. In all, she remained in service for over a century before being sold in 1801.

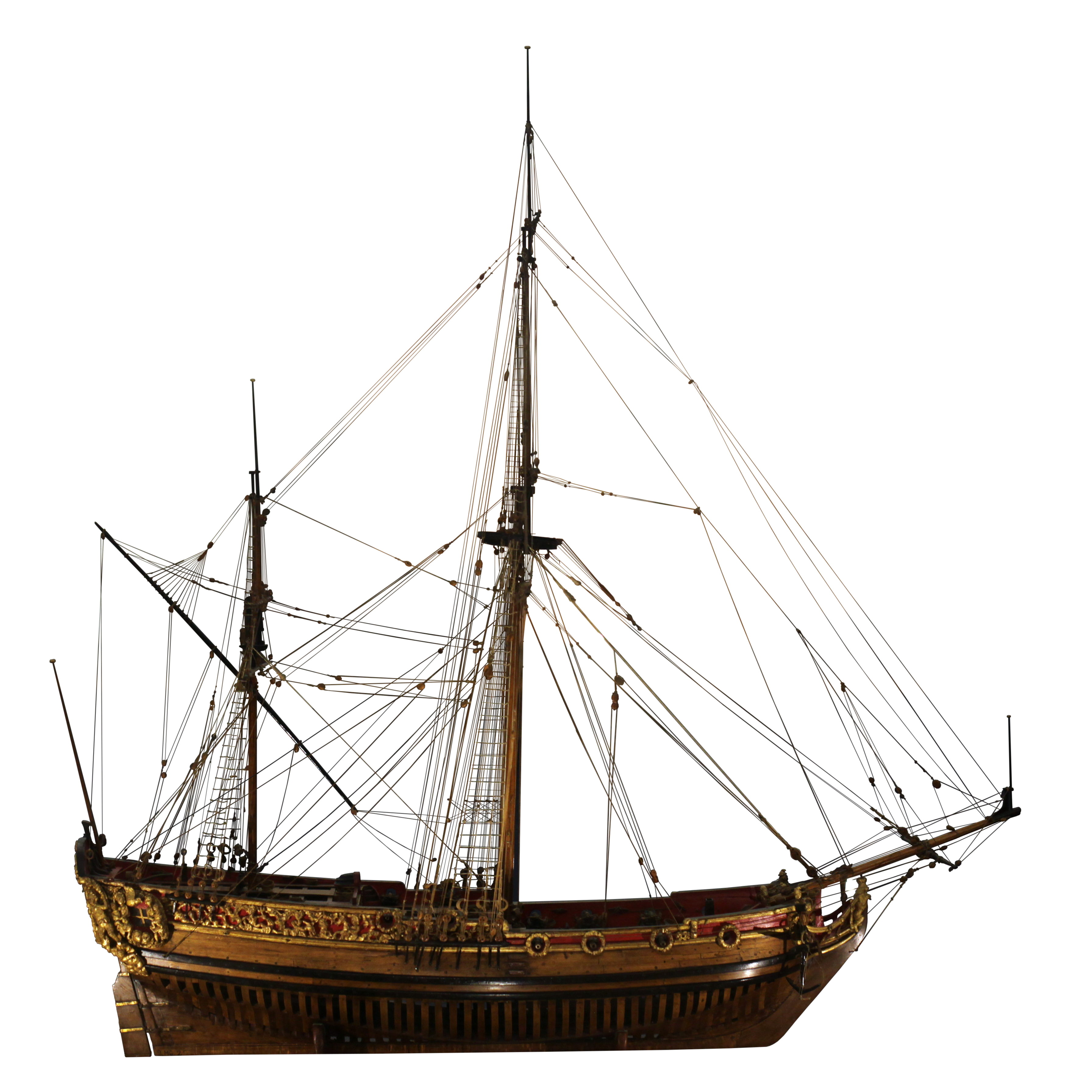
Scale model of an English royal yacht, probably William & Mary. On display at the Musée national de la Marine, Paris.

== Service history ==
King William III and his wife Queen Mary II ordered her built in February 1693. She was designed and built by Robert Lee, a Master Shipwright at Chatham Dockyard and launched in September 1694.

William and Mary, like other royal yachts, was generally used as a transport for senior military, political, and diplomatic figures, as well as for the royal family. She frequently carried William III or his officers and staff to Holland when there were crises warranting their presence.

In 1697 Tsar Peter the Great visited western Europe. William III sent HMS York to bring Peter from Holland to England. On York's arrival at the Thames, Peter transferred to William and Mary, and in her sailed up the river to London Bridge, where he alighted to reach the Palace of Whitehall.

From 1695 to 1701, William and Mary's captain was Sir William Saunderson. In 1702 Captain William Robinson replace Sanderson. Robinson was in command when she participated in the battle of Malaga in 1704. He remained in command until January 1713, when she was paid off and sent to Deptford Dockyard for repairs, which were completed by December 1714.

In 1719 William and Mary was recommissioned under Captain John Guy, who remained her commander to 1720. In 1721 Captain William Moses replaced Guy, and remained in command until May 1727. On 4 May 1727 Captain Timothy Brett replaced Guy. She returned to Deptford for major repairs that took place between February 1736 and May 1737. Brett died on 3 May 1739, and his replacement that year was Captain William Parry. Between May and August 1742 William and Mary underwent smaller repairs at Deptford. More extensive repairs followed between September 1746 and May 1747. On 7 February 1753, Captain John Moore replaced Parry. Moore remained in command until 1755.

Perhaps William and Mary's most notable voyage occurred on 7 August 1761 when she was one of squadron of six royal yachts—Royal Caroline (renamed Royal Charlotte), Charlot, Katherine, Fubbs and Mary—that accompanied by six ships-of-war, sailed from Harwich to Cuxhaven under the command of Admiral of the Fleet Lord Anson to embark Princess Charlotte of Mecklenburg-Strelitz, future wife of King George III, at Stade. The flotilla arrived back at Harwich on 6 September after a ten-day voyage, having endured westerly gales that three times blew them over to the Norwegian coast, twice almost wrecking them.

From December 1763 to August 1765 William Norton commanded William and Mary. However, from January 1764 until August 1765 she was again at Deptford, where Adam Hayes completely rebuilt her.

William and Mary then had a number of commanders. Her captain between 1779 and 1782 was George Young. Captain George Vanderput recommissioned her in June 1783. She then underwent a major repair and coppering at a private yard on the Thames, something which took until 1786. Captain Charles Buckner assumed command in 1787 and remained in command until 1792. The next year she was paid off.

== Fate ==
She was the oldest ship in the Navy at the time of her decommissioning around 1800. The Principal Officers and Commissioners of His Majesty's Navy offered the hull of "William and Mary, 172 Tons Burthen, Copper fastened" for sale at Deptford Yard on 14 September 1801. She sold at auction on that day for £210.

== See also ==
- List of royal yachts of the United Kingdom
