= List of royal yachts of the United Kingdom =

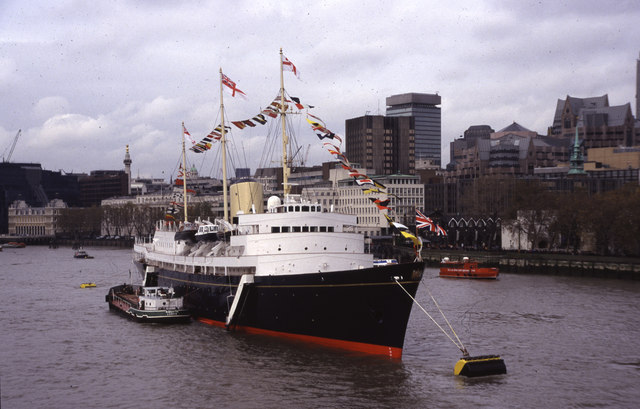
HMY Britannia in 1997

There have been 83 royal yachts of the monarchy of the United Kingdom since the restoration of the monarchy in 1660.

King Charles II had 25 royal yachts, while five were simultaneously in service in 1831.

Merchantmen or warships have occasionally been chartered or assigned for special duty as a temporary royal yacht, for example the steamship Ophir in 1901 and the battleship HMS Vanguard in 1947.

Since 1998, following a successful national tender process, Britannia has been berthed permanently at the Port of Leith in Edinburgh. There are currently no British royal yachts, although MV Hebridean Princess and MY Leander G have both been used by the royal family.

== Kingdom of England ==
Data about launch years from Royal Yachts of the World (1997) by Tim Madge

- Mary (1660–1675)
- Royal Escape (dates unknown)
- Anne (1661–unknown)
- Bezan (1661–unknown)
- Katherine (first ship of that name) (1661–unknown): built by Phineas Pett
- Minion (dates unknown)
- Charles (first ship of that name) (1662–unknown)
- Jamie or Jemmy (1662–unknown)
- Henrietta (first ship of that name) (1663–unknown)
- Merlin* (1666–unknown)
- Monmouth (1666–unknown)
- Navy (1666–unknown)
- Saudadoes (1670–unknown)
- Cleveland (1671–unknown)
- Queenborough (first ship of that name) (1671–unknown)
- Deale (1673–unknown)
- Isle of Wight (1673–unknown)
- Kitchen (1670–unknown)
- Katherine (second ship of that name) (1674–unknown)
- Portsmouth (first ship of that name) (1674–unknown)
- Charles (second ship of that name) (1675–unknown)
- Charlot (1677–unknown)
- Mary (second ship of that name) (1677–unknown)
- Henrietta (second ship of that name) (1679–unknown)
- Izabella Bezan (1680–unknown)
- Fubbs (1682–unknown)
- Isabella (first ship of that name) (1680–unknown)
- William & Mary (first ship of that name) (1694–unknown)
- Squirrel (1694–unknown)
- Scout (1695–unknown)
- Queenborough (second ship of that name) (1701–unknown)
- Soesdyke (1702–unknown)
- Portsmouth (second ship of that name) (1702–unknown)
- Isabella (1703–unknown)
- Drake (1705–unknown)

== Kingdom of Great Britain ==
- Dublin (1709–unknown)
- Bolton (1709–unknown)
- Charlot (1710–unknown)
- Carolina (1710–unknown)
- Chatham (1710–unknown)
- Chatham (1741–unknown)
- Portsmouth (1742–unknown)
- Royal Caroline (renamed Royal Charlotte in 1761) (1750–1820)
- Dorset (1753–unknown)
- Plymouth (1755–unknown)
- Augusta (1771–unknown)
- Portsmouth (1794–unknown)
- Plymouth (1796–unknown)

== United Kingdom ==
- Royal Sovereign (1804–1849)
- William & Mary (1807–unknown)
- Royal George (1817–1842)
- Prince Regent (1820–unknown)
- Royal Charlotte (1824–1832)
- Royal Adelaide (1834–1878)
- Victoria and Albert (1843–1855): remained in service as Osborne (1855–1867)
- Fairy (1845–1863) (tender to Victoria and Albert)
- Elfin (1848–1901)
- Victoria and Albert (ii) (1855–1900)
- Alberta (1863–1913) (tender to Victoria and Albert (ii))
- Osborne (1870–1908) (tender to Victoria and Albert (ii))
- Victoria and Albert (iii) (1901–1937)
- RMS Ophir* (1901): chartered steamship for the royal tour of the colonies
- Alexandra (1908–1925)
- RMS Medina (1911–1912): chartered P&O steamship for the royal visit to India
- Britannia (royal cutter yacht) (1893–1936)
- RMS Empress of Britain (1931–1940)
- RMS Empress of Australia (1939)
- HMS Renown (1916): used in 1920 for the Prince of Wales Empire tour and in 1927 by the Duke and Duchess of York to visit Australia
- HMS Vanguard (1947): battleship used to take George VI and family to South Africa
- Gothic (1952–1954)
- Britannia (1954–1997)

== Potential new yacht ==
In 2021, the UK government announced plans for a new 'ship of state' to be managed jointly between the Ministry of Defence, Foreign, Commonwealth and Development Office and Department for International Trade. The plan for the ship is to "host trade fairs, ministerial summits and diplomatic talks", fulfilling functions in a similar capacity to previous Royal Yachts. The ship would be crewed by the Royal Navy. The cost was placed at between £200M and £250M. Some reports suggested the yacht would be named after the late Duke of Edinburgh. By late 2022, some reports suggested that the UK government might not proceed with the new yacht.

== See also ==
- Royal Yacht Squadron
- Royal barge of the United Kingdom
- Royal Mews
- State and royal cars of the United Kingdom
- Air transport of the Royal Family and government of the United Kingdom
- British Royal Train
- List of imperial and royal yachts by country

== Sources ==
- Madge, Tim (1997). Royal Yachts of the World. Thomas Reed Publications. pp. 182–183. ISBN 0-901281-74-3.

=== Further reading ===
- Fenwick, Valerie; Gale, Alison (1998). Historic Shipwrecks, Discovered, Protected and Investigated. Tempus Publishing Limited. pp. 112–113. ISBN 0-7524-1473-9.
- Lavery, Brain (2022). Royal Yachts Under Sail. Barnsley, UK: Pen & Sword Books Limited. ISBN 978-13990-9-294-4.
