= Louise de Kérouaille, Duchess of Portsmouth =

French mistress of King Charles II (1649–1734)

Louise de Kérouaille
- Duchess of Portsmouth
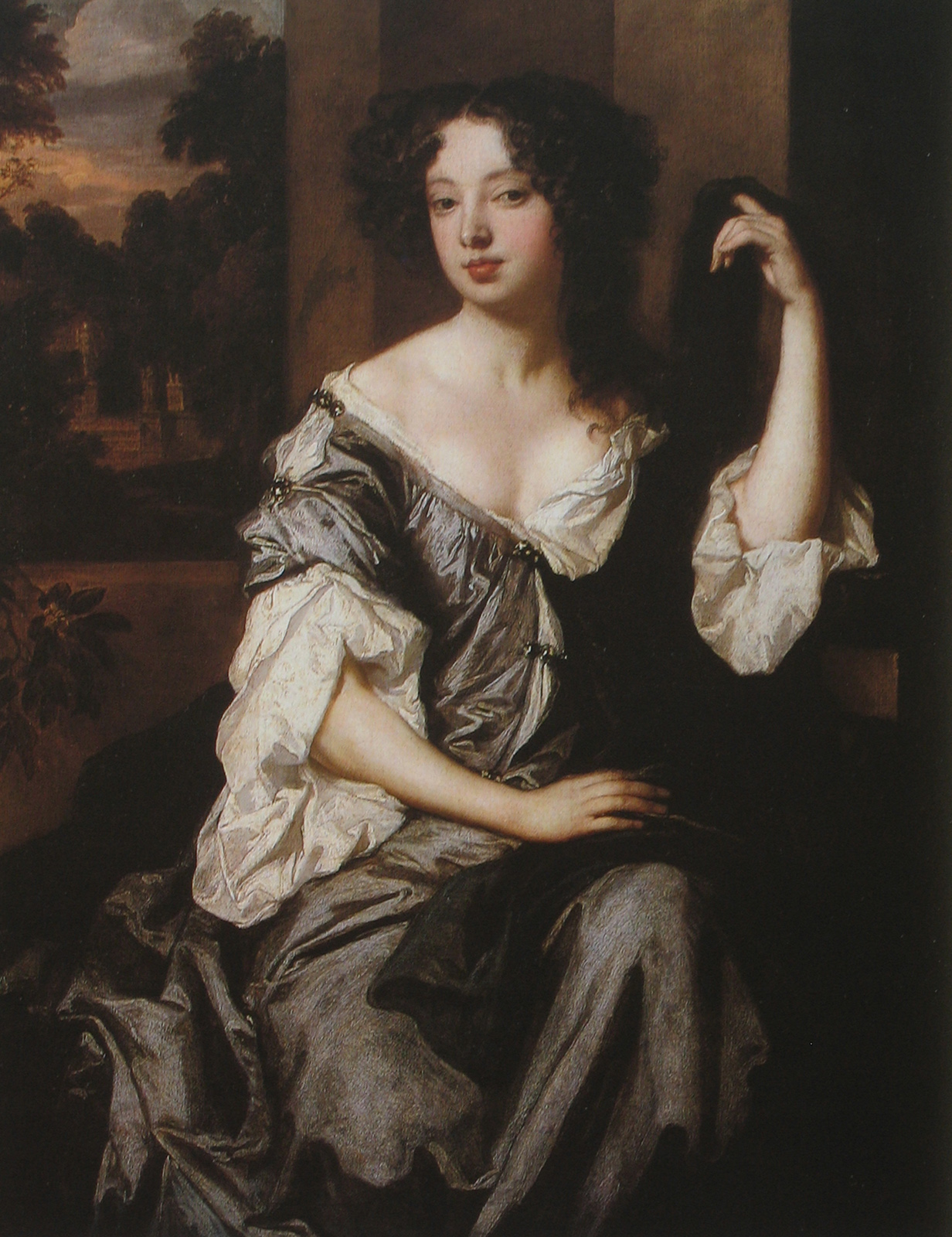
- Portrait by Sir Peter Lely, c. 1671
- Full name: Louise Renée de Penancoët de Kérouaille
- Born: 5 September 1649
- Died: 14 November 1734 (aged 85); Paris, France
- Buried: Church of the Carmelite Convent
- Issue: Charles Lennox, 1st Duke of Richmond
- Father: Guillaume de Kérouaille
- Mother: Marie de Plœuc, Dame de Timeur et de Kergorlay

Louise Renée de Penancoët de Kérouaille (5 September 1649 – 14 November 1734) was French noblewoman who was both Duchess of Portsmouth and Duchess of Aubigny in the peerage of France. She was a maid of honour to Henrietta Anne, Duchess of Orléans, a lady in waiting to Catherine of Braganza, and a mistress of King Charles II of England for 15 years until his death.

== Early life in France ==
Coat of arms of the Penancoët de Keroual family

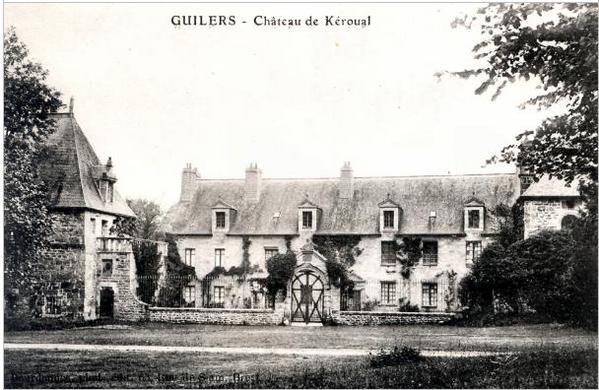
Chateau de Kérouaille, near Brest, Brittany, property of Louise's de Penancoët family; she was born there in 1649

Louise was the daughter of Count Guillaume de Penancoët, Seigneur de Kérouaille (1615-1690), and his wife, Marie de Plœuc, Dame de Timeur et de Kergorlay (1625-1709). The Kérouaille family were nobles in Brittany, and their name was so spelt by themselves. The form "Quérouaille" was commonly used in England. All are derivations of the original Breton name Kerouazle, which is the most common form in Brittany.

Her sister, Henriette Mauricette de Penancoët de Kérouaille, married firstly in 1674 Philip Herbert, 7th Earl of Pembroke, and secondly in 1685 Jean-Timoléon Gouffier, Marquis de Thais. Her aunt Suzanne de Penancoët married Claude Le Veyer; their daughter Catherine Le Veyer became the matriarch of the family of Counts Saisy de Kerampuil.

== Versailles to England ==
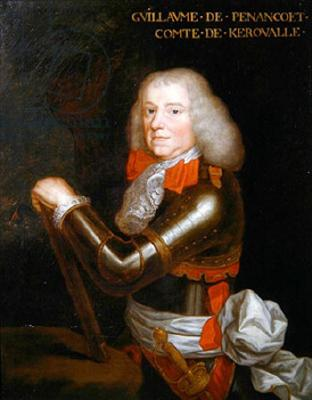
Louise's father: Guillaume de Penancoët, Comte de Kérouaille (1615-1690)

De Kérouaille was introduced early to the household of Henrietta Anne Stuart, Duchess of Orléans, sister of King Charles II of England, Scotland and Ireland, and sister-in-law of King Louis XIV of France. The diarist Louis de Rouvroy, duc de Saint-Simon asserts that her family threw her in the way of Louis XIV in the hope that she would become a royal mistress. In 1670, she accompanied Henrietta on a visit to Charles II at Dover, where Charles II secretly signed the Treaty of Dover, promising his conversion to Catholicism.

The circumstances of Louise's arrival at the English court is fuzzy, but the sudden death of Henrietta left her unprovided for.

French ambassador Colbert de Croissy wrote to France of Charles II's profound grief, believing it may rupture the Anglo-French alliance codified in the recent Treaty of Dover. Simultaneously, the Duke of Buckingham wished to gain better favour with Charles and oust his current mistress, Barbara Villiers, Countess of Castlemaine. This suited Louis XIV, but it is unclear at this point if he intended to use Louise as a intermediary or a spy. It was later said that the French court had selected de Kérouaille to fascinate Charles, but there seems to be no evidence for that. Yet when there appeared a prospect that Charles would show her favour, the intrigue was vigorously pushed by the French ambassador, Colbert de Croissy, who was aided by the English secretary of state Henry Bennet, 1st Earl of Arlington, and his wife.

Nonetheless, Charles appointed her as a lady-in-waiting to his own queen, Catherine of Braganza. Unlike Charles' previous mistress Barbara Palmer, who had openly insulted the Queen, de Kérouaille was careful to show her every respect, and relations between the two women were never less than amicable. One possible reason for that is that Louise shared the Queen's Roman Catholic faith.

De Kérouaille yielded to Charles' romantic advances only after she had established a strong hold on his affections.

== Mistress to Charles II ==
Louise inhabited magnificent apartments in Whitehall. Her rooms were adorned with French tapestries and paintings. Contemporary reports believed these rooms to be several times more rich and glorious than that of the queen.

In 1672, de Kérouaille gave birth to Charles II's son. On 19 August 1673, the titles of Baroness Petersfield, Countess of Fareham and Duchess of Portsmouth were granted to her for life. Her pensions and money allowances were enormous, £136,000 in 1681 alone. The French court gave her frequent presents and, in December 1673, at Charles II's request, conferred upon her the title Duchess of Aubigny in the peerage of France. Her son by the King, Charles (1672–1723), was created Duke of Richmond and Duke of Lennox in 1675.

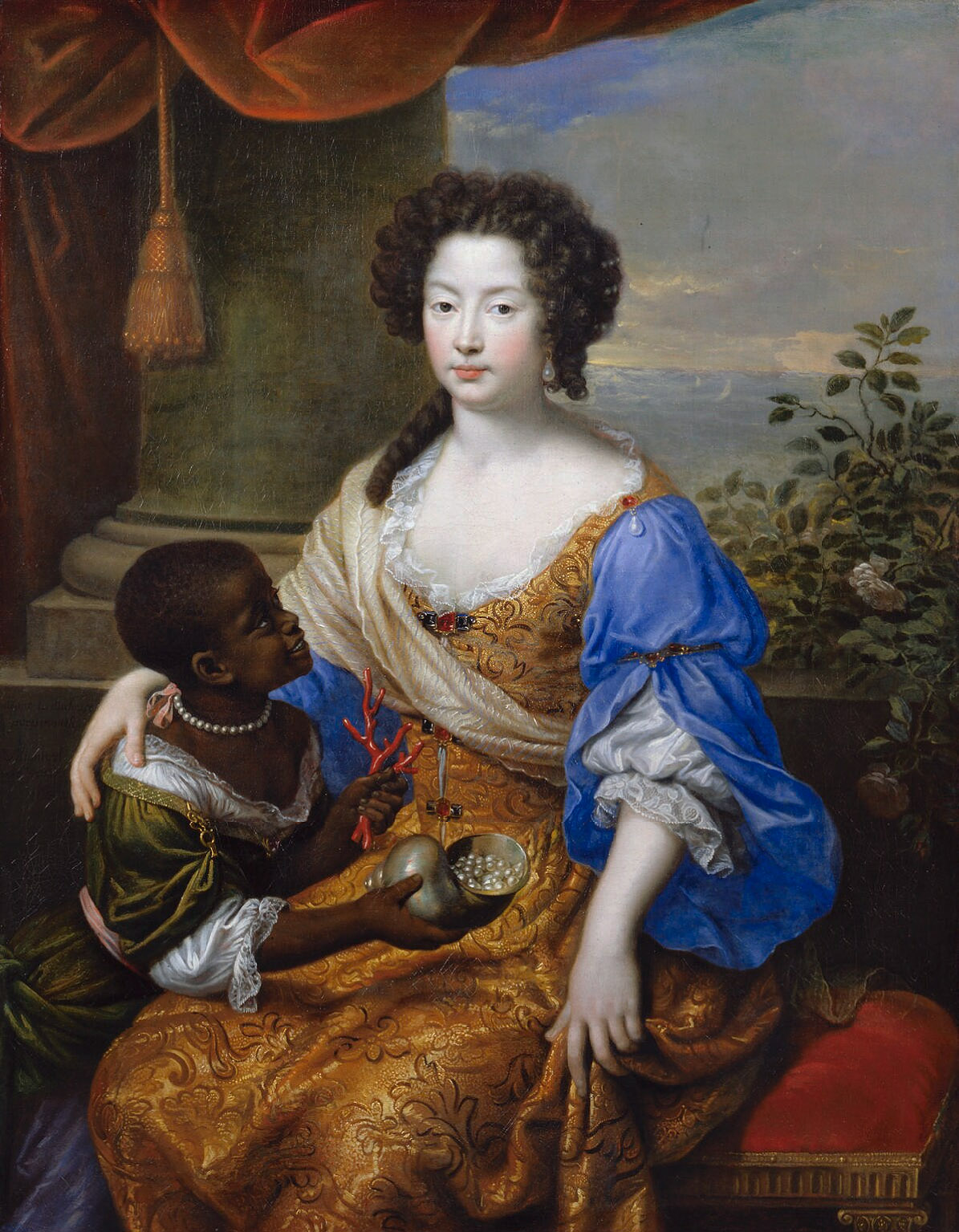
A portrait of de Kérouaille with a young black girl presenting precious coral and pearls to her by Pierre Mignard

The support Portsmouth received from the French envoy was given on the understanding that she should advance the interests of her native sovereign. The bargain was confirmed by gifts and honours from Louis XIV and was loyally carried out by Portsmouth, but she was much disliked by the English public. Louis XIV gave her a pair of earrings worth the astonishing sum of eighteen thousand pounds, his most expensive gift to England that year and more lavish than anything he had ever given Charles' queen.

Portsmouth was openly distrusted and even hated in England due to her religion and nationality as well as her sinful role as mistress. Her work to secure alliances with and favours for France provoked strong resentment. Nell Gwynne, another of Charles' mistresses, called her "Squintabella" and, when mistaken for her, replied, "Pray good people be civil, I am the Protestant whore."

Portsmouth retained Charles' affections until his death. She contrived to escape uninjured during the crisis of the "Popish Plot" in 1678, and found an unexpected ally in Queen Catherine, who was grateful for the kindness and consideration Portsmouth had always shown her. She was strong enough to maintain her position during a long illness in 1677, and even after a visit to France in 1682.

One of Charles' nicknames for her was "Fubbs", which could refer to the plumpness thought ideal for the female form at the time, but was also recorded in the early eighteenth century as a loving term for "pretty children and women". In 1682, Charles built the royal yacht HMY Fubbs. According to the French ambassador, she assisted in having Charles II received into the Catholic Church on his deathbed in 1685. That Charles was truly attached to her is shown by his dying instruction to his brother to "do well by Portsmouth", (Note: This is a paraphrase by Fraser.) making her one of three women in his life, along with the Queen and Nell Gwynne, who were in his thoughts at the end.

== Political Role ==
Charles II was often found at parties or played cards in Louise's Whitehall apartments, so these became sites where intimate business talks could take place, which would sometimes include Louise. On some occasions, she hosted peace talks. Late 1677, when tensions between England and France became strained, her apartments saw talks between the French ambassador Paul Barillon d'Amoncourt and Charles. Soothing these tensions, Louise and Robert Spencer, the Earl of Sunderland, were employed to negotiate a subsidy from France to appease Charles to do without Parliament.

== After Charles II's death ==
Portsmouth quickly fell from favour after Charles II's death. She retired to France, where she remained except for a short visit to England during the reign of James II and her attendance at the coronation of George I. Her attendance at George I's coronation was remarked upon by Catherine Sedley, Countess of Dorchester when they met Elizabeth Hamilton, Countess of Orkney ("we three whores"). Between them, they had been in turn the maîtresse en titre for successive kings for over 20 years. Her pensions and a grant on the Irish revenue Charles II gave her were lost either during James II's reign or at the Revolution of 1688.

During her last years, Portsmouth lived at Aubigny under mounting debt, but she received a pension and protection against her creditors from King Louis XIV and later the regent Philippe II, Duke of Orléans. Portsmouth died in Paris on 14 November 1734, aged 85.

== In literature ==
- Louise figures, together with Barbara Villiers and Nell Gwyn, in George Bernard Shaw's late play In Good King Charles's Golden Days (1939) and Jessica Swale's Nell Gwynn (2015).
- Louise briefly appears in Kathleen Winsor's Forever Amber.
- Louise is mentioned in the children's novel, Eliza Rose, by Mary Hooper, as a minor role.
- Louise appears in Dark Angels by Karleen Koen, although her character goes by the name of Renee.
- Louise is the primary character in The French Mistress by Susan Holloway Scott.
- Louise is a major character in The Empress of Ice Cream by Anthony Capella.
- Louise is a major character in Shadows of London by Andrew Taylor.
- Louise, and the Royal Yacht were mentioned in the film England, My England. Of Louise, a character notes that she was "squat, and broad of beam."
- Louise appears in Merivel :A Man of his Time by Rose Tremain (2012)

== Arms ==
Coat of arms of Louise de Kérouaille, Duchess of Portsmouth
Coronet That of a duke Escutcheon Barry of 6, Argent and Azure Supporters Two greyhounds regardant, collared (tinctures unknown; could be the White Greyhound of Richmond, as mother of Charles Lennox, 1st Duke of Richmond). Other elements A mantle of peer.

== See also ==
- English royal mistress
