= Greenvile Collins =

English hydrographer

Captain Greenvile Collins
- Born: 1643
- Died: c. 25 March 1694
- Branch: Royal Navy
- Rank: Captain
- Known for: Great Britain's Coasting Pilot

Greenvile Collins (also spelt Greenvill or Greenville; c. 1643 – c. 25 March 1694) was an officer of the Royal Navy and prominent hydrographer, who compiled Great Britain's Coasting Pilot, the first survey of the country's coast undertaken by a Briton.

== Early career ==
Collins served as a master on ships, joining the Sweepstakes in this position for a voyage to the south seas with Sir John Narborough between 1669 and 1671. The Admiralty appointed him as master of the Speedwell in 1676. John Wood commanded that ship, and intended to reach Japan by the then supposed North-East passage. Wood had served with Collins aboard the Sweepstake during Narborough's expedition, and held Collins in high regard. The Speedwell was wrecked off Novaya Zemlya, but the crew was rescued and returned aboard their consort ship, Prosperous. Collins's journal of the voyage brought him to the attention of King Charles II. Collins continued his naval career, serving as master of HMS Charles Galley on an expedition to Tangier with Admiral Narborough in 1677. From the Charles Galley he transferred first to HMS Royal James, then HMS Newcastle and HMS Plymouth in turn, serving as master aboard each. After good service, he was gazetted as captain, and appointed to command the 18-gun HMS Larke. He again kept a journal, in which he recorded his encounters with the Algerine and Ottoman pirates and their destruction at the hand of the English ship, and drew maps which showed his hydrographic skill.

== Surveying career ==
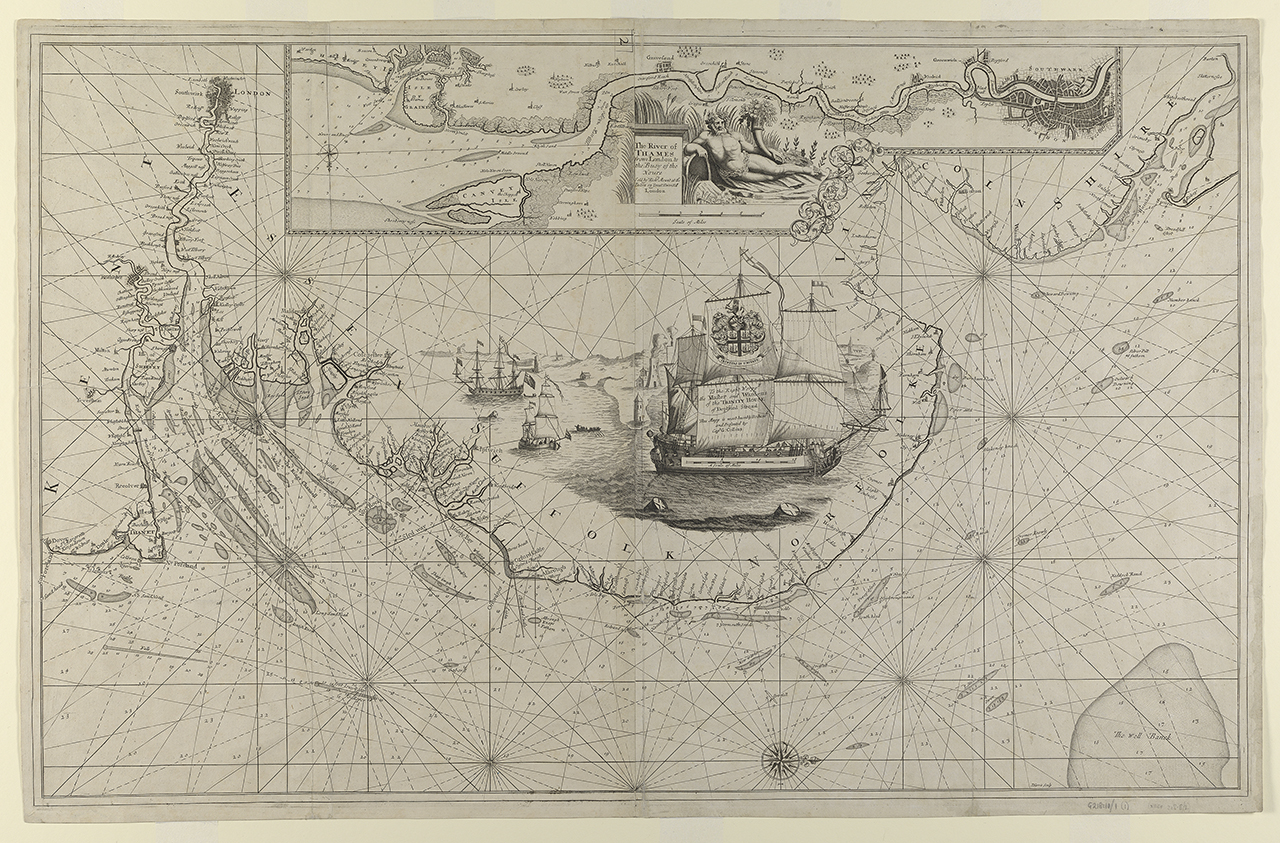
Nautical chart by Collins (1698) showing the North Sea from the Thames Estuary (left) to the Wash (right)

Collins then undertook another Mediterranean tour as master of the Leopard; this voyage ran through the whole of 1680 and into the first few months of the year following. Henry Fitzroy, Charles II's natural son and later Duke of Grafton, accompanied Collins during that voyage. Earlier, Collins had gained the King's attention with the quality of his Arctic journal keeping.

With this access, Collins began to lobby in 1680 for support for his proposals to undertake an improved survey of the country's coasts. Prior to this time nautical charts were often defective, and there was no centralised system for collecting and disseminating the better maps made by experienced seamen. In the Spring of 1681, Collins gained the King's preferment to survey the country's coasts. For the survey, the Admiralty supplied Collins with the 8-gun yacht HMS Merlin for the first two years and then the yacht HMS Monmouth until 1686. His surveying was carried out under the supervision of Trinity House, who also supported the project with financial contributions. Samuel Pepys insisted that Collins be made a younger brother of Trinity House.

Collins eventually spent seven years on the survey, at first on the Merlin and Monmouth, later aboard the Martin and Younge Spragge. As well as his own observations, he likely included existing charts and seamen's sketches and notes, and published charts as they were completed. Collins began gathering engraved copper plates with which to print his charts while he was engaged on the survey, and continued gathering more plates in the years following. In 1693, he finally published his results in a folio volume of two parts, Great Britain's Coasting Pilot, containing sailing directions, tide tables, coastal views and about forty-nine charts. The charts were not completely accurate, but with all their shortcomings they were an enormous advance on anything before them, and entitled Collins to rank not only with the earliest, but with the best of English hydrographers. The work covered England and Scotland, and though Collins proposed a further study to cover Ireland, the plan came to nothing. Collins recorded that he had spent £40 on instruments, and charged £80 for the 120 manuscript maps he delivered. With his claim for expenses set at £200 per annum, and his wages of £394 10s., he claimed a total of £1914 10s. for his work, which was eventually paid in arrears. The cost was more than three times the original estimate. His cousin, Freeman Collins, printed the Coasting Pilot, which Richard Mount sold. Mount's subsequent firm then went on to publish twenty-one further editions of the pilot throughout the nineteenth century. The Sudbrook Press published the book as a reduced facsimile in 1964, followed by Early English Books first in microfilm and then online.

== Later life ==
His reputation as a hydrographer established, Collins was allowed to style himself hydrographer in ordinary to the King from 1683, and in 1693 he became one of the elder brethren of Trinity House. In 1684 Collins surveyed encroachments onto the River Thames by riparian bank owners within the City of London. After the survey, Collins served as master of HMS Resolution under Admiral George Legge, 1st Baron Dartmouth. Admiral Legge allowed William of Orange to make a successful landing at Torbay. Collins then served as commander of the yacht HMS Mary continuously until the end of 1693. Collins became master of the yacht HMY Fubbs in 1694, and died while in command of her on or about 25 March 1694. He had married Elinor Hocker in 1679 at St Margaret's, Westminster; they had ten children together. His widow received £500 from the Treasurer of the Navy in 1695.

Collins's publications bear various ways of spelling his first name, but Greenvile is the most dominant. However he mostly spelled out his own name as Greenvill.

== Sources ==
- Baigent, Elizabeth (2004). "Collins, Greenvile (d. 1694)". Oxford Dictionary of National Biography. Oxford Dictionary of National Biography (online ed.). Oxford University Press. doi:10.1093/ref:odnb/5938. (Subscription, Wikipedia Library access or UK public library membership required.)
- Hughes, Paul (2022). Seventeenth Century Practical Mathematics: navigation by Greenvill Collins. New York, NY: Routledge. ISBN 9780367620479.

=== Further reading ===
- Dyer, Florence (1928). "The Journal of Grenvill Collins". Mariner's Mirror. 14 (3): 197–219. doi:10.1080/00253359.1928.10655471.
- Elphick, Michael (21 December 1988). Out of Norfolk: Seamen and Travellers. Briston, UK: Orlando Publishing. ISBN 1870982010.
- Mountfield, Stuart (1970). "Captain Greenville Collins and Mr. Pepys". Mariner's Mirror. 56 (1): 85–95. doi:10.1080/00253359.1970.10658517.
- Hyde, Ralph (1974). "Seven manuscript Thames charts by Greenville Collins". Mariner's Mirror. 5 (1): 38–40.
- Verner, Coolie (1969). Captain Collins' Coasting Pilot A Carto-bibliographical Analysis. The Map Collectors Circle. pp. 4–47.
- Wells, Peter (2019). Great Britain's Coasting Pilot: Carto-iconography in a Baroque Sea-atlas (Volume 1 of 2) (PDF) (MA dissertation). University of York.
