= Battle of Nevis =

1667 naval battle

Coordinates: 17.0863°N 62.6101°W

- Part of the Second Anglo-Dutch War
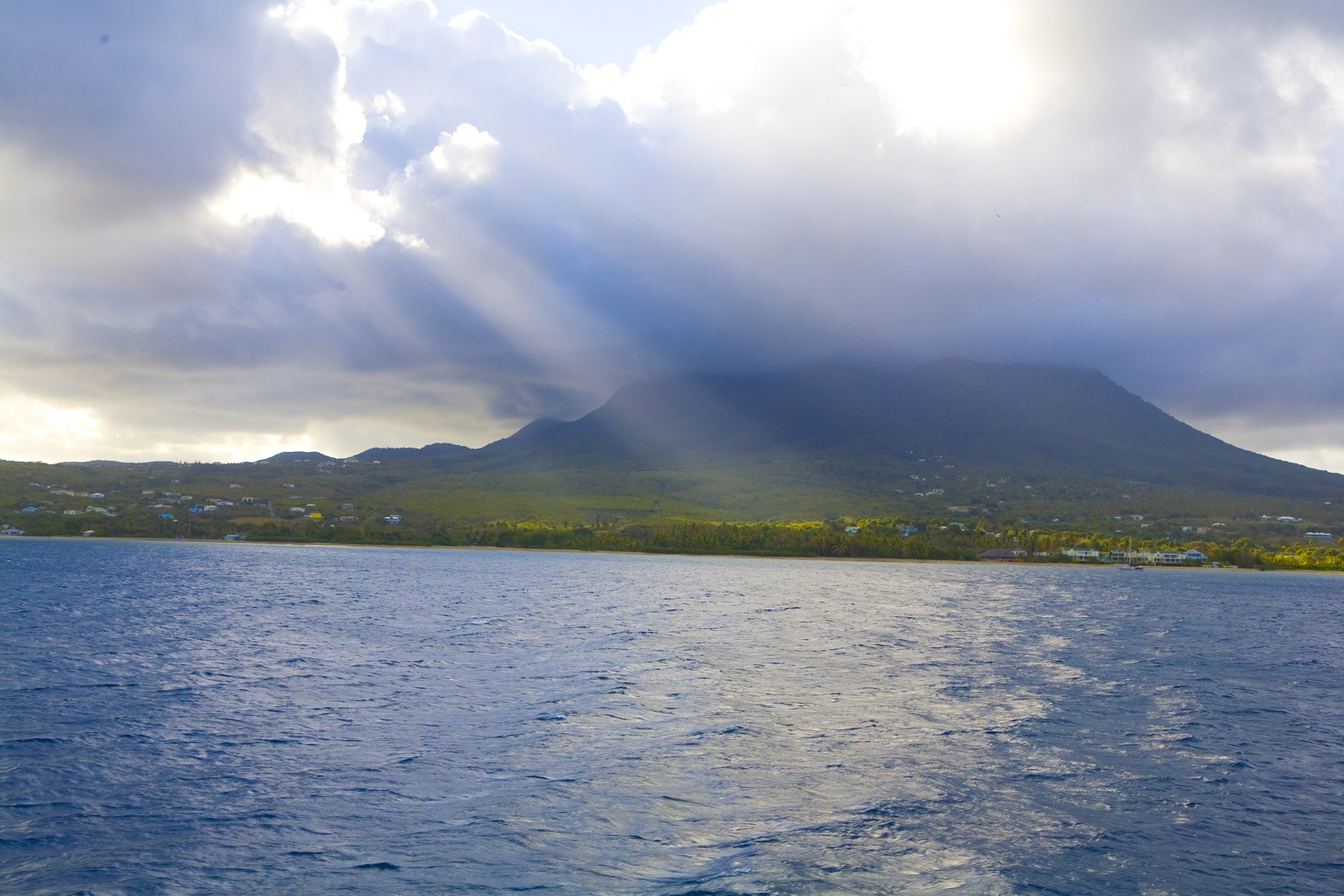
- Present view of the west coast of Nevis
Date	20 May 1667
Location	Caribbean Sea off Nevis
Result	English victory

Belligerents
England	Dutch Republic; France

Commanders and leaders
(England) John Berry	(Dutch Republic) Abraham Crijnssen (Kingdom of France) Antoine Lefèbvre de La Barre

Strength
11 Ships	20 warships, 12 transports, 1,100 troops

Casualties and losses
1 ship lost	2 ships lost

The Battle of Nevis on 20 May 1667 was a confused naval clash in the Caribbean off the island of Nevis during the closing stages of the Second Anglo-Dutch War. It was fought between an English squadron and an Allied Franco-Dutch fleet intent on invading the island. The battle ended up being an English victory in that it prevented a Franco-Dutch invasion of Nevis.

== Background ==
Early in 1667 the French, having joined on the side of the Dutch, decided to target England's Caribbean colonies. They captured their half of St. Kitts, Antigua, and Montserrat, and now threatened to invade Nevis. In March, Captain John Berry, in the 56-gun Man-of-war Coronation arrived at Barbados and the Governor decided to make an attempt to save Nevis. He bought up a number of armed merchantmen and created a squadron of ten men-of-war and one fireship under Berry's command.

Having arrived at Nevis, Berry decided on blockading French held Saint Kitts on 17 April. On 14 May at Martinique French Admiral de La Barre, Martinique's governor Vice Admiral Robert de Clodoré and Guadeloupe's governor Rear Admiral Claude François du Lyon, plus the fireships were met by Crijnssen’s Dutch squadron who had reconquered Berbice and St Eustatius from the English. In a conference they decided on a combined attack against Nevis and were further strengthened by 600 volunteers raised on Martinique plus another 500 picked up two days later at Guadeloupe. On 18 May the combined force headed toward Nevis.

== Action ==
On 20 May in the early morning rounding the southern points of Nevis, the Franco-Dutch fleet was sighted by English reconnaissance boats, who carried a warning into Charlestown. By 8 a.m. Captain Berry immediately prepared for action knowing that he was outnumbered and then waited for the attack with ten large men of war headed by Coronation of 50 guns, two frigates and 2 fireships. Meanwhile, the militia on Nevis itself lined the defenses in case the French and Dutch managed to get through; they also supported the fleet with a number of cannons.

The French and Dutch fleet closed in on the English line and soon the battle commenced. The French line disintegrated into confusion while preparing to engage so De la Barre brought his flagship Lys Couronne of 38 guns into action with the Coronation but soon found himself surrounded by the English. After being badly mauled he and his ship barely managed to escape but the Dutch seeing the French collapse immediately tried to help. They came in and gave Coronation a severe pounding but they too were forced to withdraw in threat of English fireships.

In the thick of the battle an English man of war took a hit in her powder magazine and blew up and sank with most of her crew, and a 30-gun French man of war and a smaller flyboat were destroyed by fireships. The French and the Dutch seeing that they could not get through realized the battle had been lost. The battle then ended with a desultory long-range exchange between both fleets, with the English fleet still holding its line, de La Barre with increasing casualties and his ship severely damaged then decided to withdraw off towards Saint Kitts by 2 p.m. compelling the Dutch under an angry Crijnssen to follow.

== Aftermath ==
Disheartened at their poor showing, Crijnseen decided to part company with the French. On 27 May de La Barre’s fleet accompanied the Dutch as far as Saint Barthélemy and was soon chased toward Martinique by some of Berry’s ships. The English remained at Nevis and were not threatened for the rest of the war. As a result of the battle Franco-Dutch strategic collaboration in the Caribbean which could have promised so much all but ceased. To make matters worse for them Louis was not willing to commit more men and ships to the Caribbean. An English attempt to retake St. Kitts ended in failure but it would not matter as more English reinforcements arrived under Rear-Admiral Sir John Harman. They reached the West Indies in June and inflicted a heavy defeat on de la Barre at Martinique on 25 June which virtually vaporised the entire French fleet in the America's changing the situation and making sure the English had the upper hand in the Caribbean for the remainder of the war.

== Notes ==
Bibliography

- Bradley, Peter T (2000). British Maritime Enterprise in the New World: From the Late 15th to the Mid-18th Century. Edwin Mellen Press Ltd. ISBN 978-0773478664.
- Clowes, William Laird, William Laird (2003). The Royal Navy: A History - From the Earliest Times to 1900. Vol. 1. Chatham Publishing; New ed. ISBN 978-1861760104.
- Jaques, Tony (2006). Dictionary of Battles and Sieges: A Guide to 8,500 Battles from Antiquity through the Twenty-first Century. Greenwood. ISBN 978-0313335365.
- Marley, David (2008). Wars of the Americas: A Chronology of Armed Conflict in the Western Hemisphere. ISBN 978-1598841008.

External links

Rickard, J (22 August 2009), [ Rickard, J (22 August 2009), Battle of Nevis, 19 or 20 May 1667, http://www.historyofwar.org/articles/battles_nevis_1667.html ]
