= John Campbell (Royal Navy officer) =

Royal Navy officer, navigator and colonial administrator

Vice-Admiral John Campbell
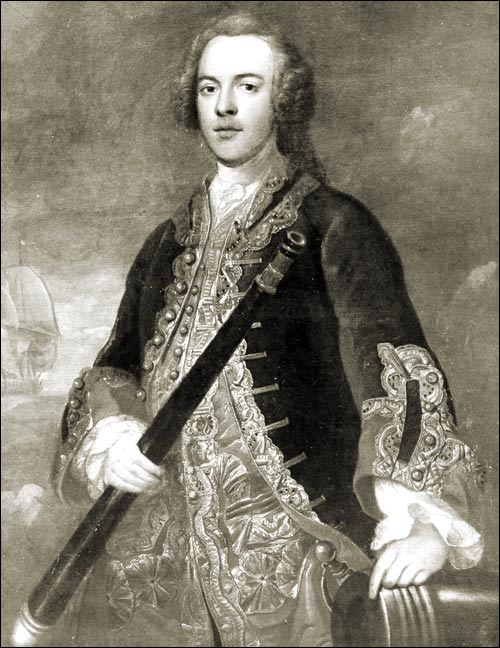
- Portrait of Campbell
- Born: 1720; Kirkbean, Kirkcudbrightshire
- Died: 16 December 1790; Berkeley Square, London
- Military career
- Allegiance: Great Britain
- Branch: Royal Navy
- Service years: Before 1740–1782
- Rank: Vice-Admiral of the White
- Conflicts: Quiberon Bay, Ushant
- Other work: Governor of Newfoundland, astronomer

Viceregal styles of John Campbell
- Reference style: His Excellency
- Spoken style: Your Excellency

Vice-Admiral of the White John Campbell (1720 – 16 December 1790) was a Royal Navy officer, navigator and colonial administrator. Born in the parish of Kirkbean, Kirkcudbrightshire, Campbell was joined the British navy at an early age and sailed around the world in 1740 on Centurion. He later became known as a navigational expert, and was from 1782 to his death Governor and Commander-in-Chief in Newfoundland.

== Life ==
=== Early life ===
John Campbell was born in the parish of Kirkbean, Scotland. His father, John Campbell (died 1733), was minister of Kirkbean and John was at an early age apprenticed to the master of a coasting vessel. That vessel's mate was pressed into the navy, and John is said to have entered the navy by offering himself in exchange for him. He served for three years in Blenheim, Torbay, and Russell before being appointed in 1740 as a midshipman to Centurion. On Centurion's ensuing circumnavigation of the world as the flagship of Commodore George Anson, he was promoted master's mate when a vacancy came up soon after sailing, and was promoted to master after the 1743 engagement against the Manila galleon Nuestra Señora de Covadonga. One of his fellow midshipmen was Augustus Keppel, who from then on became a lifelong friend. He was married, but his wife's name is not known.

Returning home in early January 1745, Campbell passed the examination for lieutenant on 16 January 1745, and with Anson's influence behind him, he was promoted to commander on 27 May 1747, and given command of a sloop. Promoted to post captain on 23 November 1747, he was given command of the new frigate called Bellona, a command he held until the peace in 1748. Praised for his successes on Bellona, in 1749 he was given command of the expedition to the Pacific by the sloop Porcupine and Raven, then of one to the north-west and north-east passages in the Atlantic, both of which were proposed but then called off for political reasons.

=== Astronomy and Brest ===
Meanwhile, in about 1747, Campbell had his first direct involvement in the development of astronomical navigation, as the first person to use a Hadley quadrant to measure the angular distance between the Moon and fixed stars. The astronomer royal, James Bradley, was shown Campbell's results and found them to correspond exactly with the actual distances in the sky, and Bradley and Campbell together made frequent observations at Greenwich of the Moon's distance from the Sun and stars, and of the stars' distances from one another.

His next commands after Bellona were Mermaid, Prince (90 guns) and – in 1757 – Essex (64 guns) under Edward Hawke in the Bay of Biscay and the blockade of Brest (barring an interlude in 1758/59, as flag captain to Anson in Royal George when he temporarily took over command of the Brest fleet). During Campbell's command of Essex, in 1756, James Bradley suggested to the Board of Longitude (chaired by Anson) that Campbell should give a sea trial to Tobias Mayer's new lunar tables and reflecting circle, and Campbell did so successfully within sight of the French coast, 'though they [the observations] were not taken with all the advantages that might have attended them, had I been alone; for I was all the cruise in company with an admiral whose motions I was obliged to follow', in trials which would profoundly influence marine navigation for the next 250 years. He compared Mayer's new reflecting circle instrument with the common wooden Hadley octant as means of observing lunar distances, and in doing so found Mayer's was much too heavy whereas Hadley's – though it could not measure angles beyond 90° and was often unstable in its wooden frame – was far more useful. From this, he suggested modifications to the Hadley octant, extending its arc from 45° to 60° (to allow the measurement of arcs up to 120°) and making it of brass not wood. In 1759 John Bird, commissioned by the Board of Longitude, produced an instrument taking up both suggestions, a sextant of 20 inches radius with a brass frame and 1/3 the weight of the 16-inch-diameter (410 mm) reflecting circle, which served as a prototype of the marine sextant still used today.

=== Seven Years War ===
Campbell, meanwhile, returned to Royal George as flag captain in November 1759, this time under Hawke (when Hawke moved his flag to that ship), serving as such during the decisive battle of Quiberon Bay on 20 November 1759. It was Campbell whom Hawke sent to England on 24 November in the frigate Vengeance with news of the victory, and after a six-day voyage Campbell, accompanied by Lord Anson (now First Lord of the Admiralty), personally gave the king the news.

Next, Campbell was captain of Dorsetshire (70 guns), on the home station and in the Mediterranean, from 1760 to the peace in 1763. He was admitted as a fellow of the Royal Society on 24 May 1764 (and was one of its Visitors to the Royal Observatory, Greenwich, from March 1765), before being one of those the Board of Longitude asked to 'number-crunch' the results of the 1764 second sea-trial to Barbados of John Harrison's longitude watch. From about 1764 he commanded the yacht Mary, later moving to HMY Royal Charlotte, a command he retained until promotion to rear-admiral of the blue on 23 January 1778. He was promoted to rear-admiral of the white on 29 January 1778.

Then, in March 1778, he was chosen by his old friend Admiral Keppel (now in command of the Channel Fleet), to be "captain of the fleet" and effectively chief of staff in HMS Victory, which commissioned in May 1778 as Keppel's flagship. (Campbell was Victory's "1st captain", whilst Captain Jonathan Faulknor was her "2nd Captain".) As such, he took an important part in the battle of Ushant on 27 July, was warmly recommended to the king by the first sea lord Lord Sandwich, and remained in the role until the end of 1778. He was promoted to vice-admiral of the blue on 19 March 1779 and to vice-admiral of the white on 26 September 1780.

=== Governorship ===
However, Campbell was offered no further commands until April 1782, when Keppel became Sandwich's successor as first sea lord, and appointed Campbell, governor and commander-in-chief of Newfoundland; Campbell sailed there in HMS Portland (50 guns) on 17 June 1782. On 25 June, the Franco-Spanish combined fleet commanded by Luis de Cordova intercepted Portland, which was escorting another 27 ships. Although the Franco-Spanish fleet captured 19 vessels, Portland and eight merchants managed to slip away. Campbell held the governorship from 1782 to his death in London in 1790.

During this time he returned to Britain periodically, allowing him in 1784 and 1785 – at Hans Moritz von Brühl's request – to arrange trials of Thomas Mudge's first chronometer on his passage to and from Britain and in Newfoundland (borrowing an achromatic telescope from the Board of Longitude to ascertain Newfoundland's longitude). Also, as a result of Campbell's proclamation of religious freedom for all inhabitants of Newfoundland, Bishop James Louis O'Donel authorised the construction of a Catholic church. Campbell was promoted to vice-admiral of the white on 24 September 1787.

== In popular media ==
Actor Andrew Scott was cast as Campbell in the Channel 4 TV series, Longitude in 2000.

== See also ==
- Governors of Newfoundland
- List of people of Newfoundland and Labrador

Preceded by Richard Edwards	Commodore Governor of Newfoundland; 1782–1785	Succeeded by John Elliott
