= Thomas Eyles =

Vice-Admiral Thomas Eyles
- Born: c.1769
- Died: 29 September 1835; Loddington Hall, Northamptonshire
- Military career
- Allegiance: Great Britain; United Kingdom
- Branch: Royal Navy
- Rank: Vice-Admiral of the White
- Commands: HMS Pomone; HMS Canada; HMS Temeraire; HMS Renown; HMS Plantagenet; HMY Royal Charlotte
- Conflicts: French Revolutionary Wars; Quiberon Expedition; Battle of Tory Island; Napoleonic Wars

Vice-Admiral of the White Thomas Eyles (c. 1769 – 29 September 1835) was Royal Navy officer who served during the French Revolutionary and Napoleonic Wars.

Little has been recorded about Eyles' early life, but he served for much of his time in the navy under the patronage of Sir John Borlase Warren, a prominent naval commander, who arranged for Eyles to have a significant role in the Quiberon Expedition in 1795. Success in this operation led to a promotion to captain, and command of his own frigate, the 44-gun HMS Pomone. Eyles continued to serve under Warren in the frigate squadron patrolling the Western Approaches, often captaining Warren's ships. Eyles saw action at the Battle of Tory Island in 1798, and later became Warren's flag captain after Warren's promotion and appointment to serve in the Channel Fleet.

As one of the early commanders of HMS Temeraire, Eyles had to deal with a mutiny as disaffected sailors aired their grievances at being sent abroad as peace seemed imminent. The mutiny was put down and Eyles carried out his original mission, sailing to the West Indies, before returning to Britain. Eyles appears to have been unemployed for a time, only returning to command a ship in 1809, and moving to command one of the royal yachts shortly before his promotion to rear-admiral in 1814. He rose through the ranks, never hoisting his flag, until his death as a Vice-Admiral of the White in 1835, at the age of 66.

== Early career ==
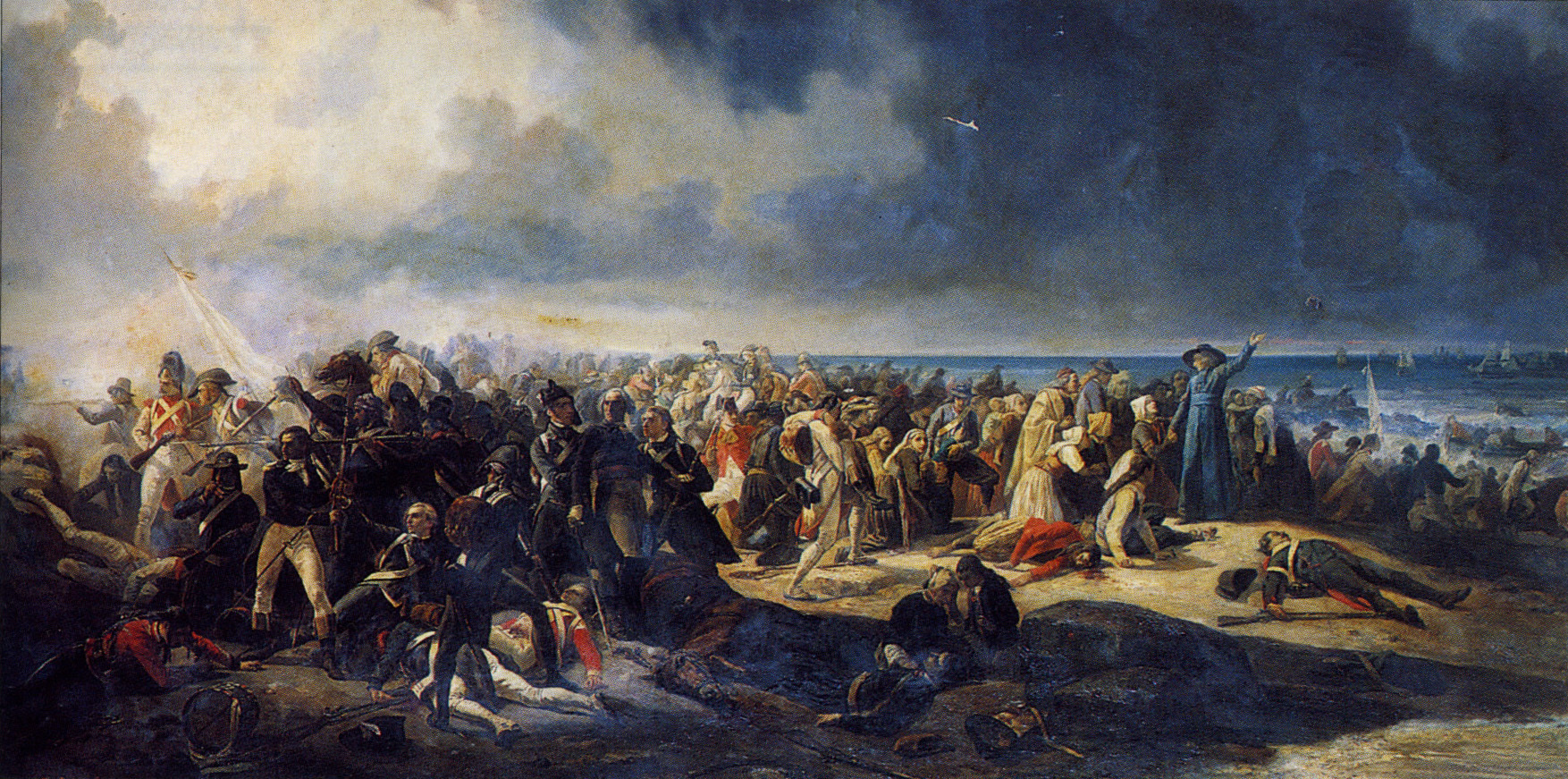
Combat de Quiberon en 1795, painting by Jean Sorieul. Though the expedition ultimately ended in failure, it brought Eyles to the Admiralty's attention, and resulted in his promotion to captain.

Eyles was the son of Thomas Eyles of Stratton Audley, Oxfordshire, and his wife, Ann Woodward Baxter, and, in turn, the father of Major Thomas Woodward Eyles. Little is recorded about Eyles's early life and career in the navy. He was a protégé of Sir John Borlase Warren and was serving aboard Warren's ship, the 44-gun HMS Pomone, during the Quiberon Expedition in mid-1795. Eyles was a lieutenant at this time, and did not have an active posting, but Warren lobbied the Admiralty to give Eyles a position on the expedition, and himself appointed Eyles to oversee all matters related to signalling and transportation. Encouraged by the expedition's initial success, the Admiralty promoted Eyles to captain on 13 July 1795 and Warren to commodore. Eyles received an appointment to command the Pomone, initially as acting captain, and later being confirmed as captain. The expedition ultimately ended in the frustration of the British plans to encourage a French Royalist rising, but Eyles and Warren both benefited from it.

== Command ==
=== With the frigate squadron ===
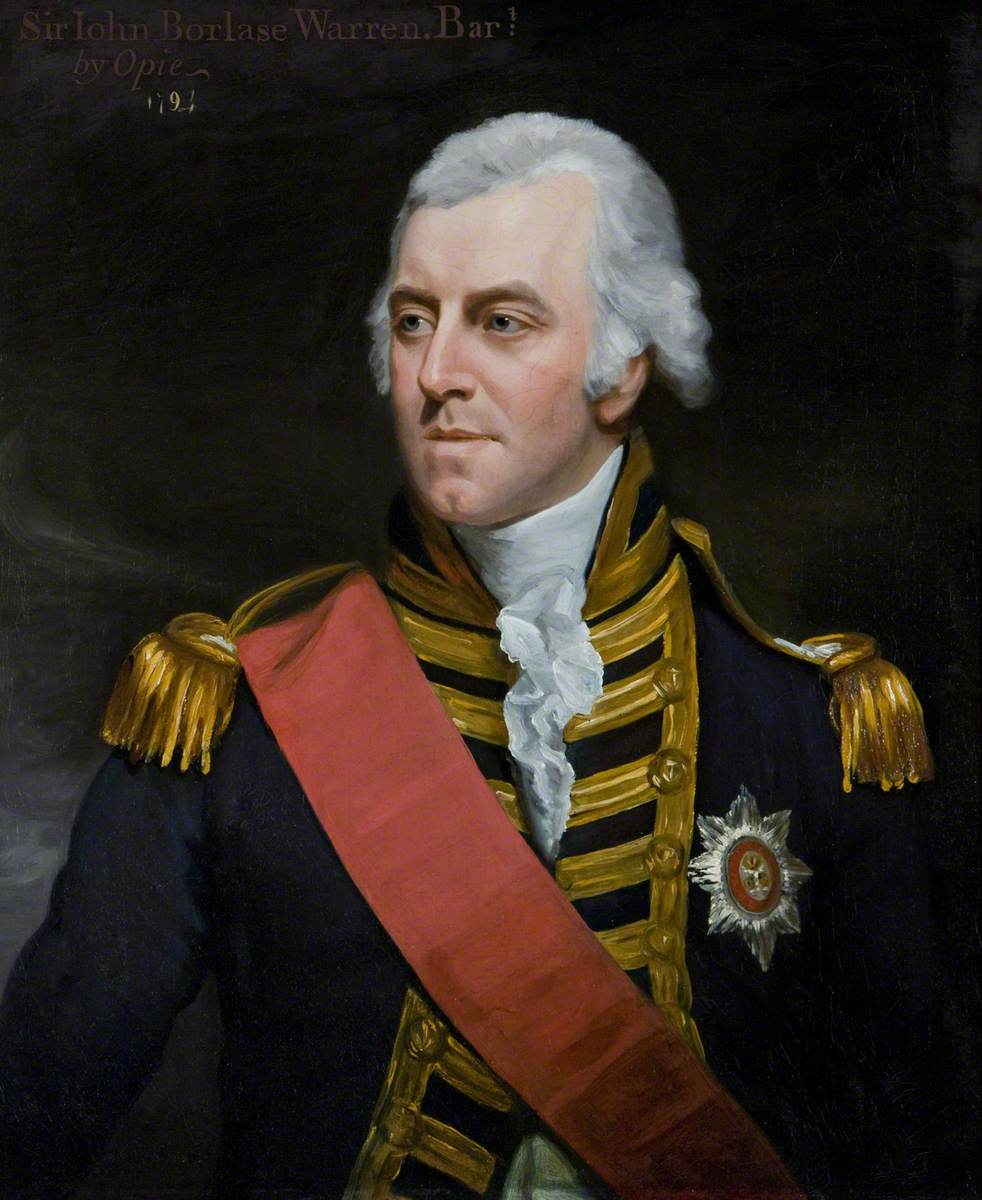
Sir John Borlase Warren, who was an enduring patron of Eyles, who served under him on a number of different ships.

Pomone continued to serve under Commodore Sir John Borlase Warren as part of the frigate squadron in the Western Approaches, and Eyles played an important part in cruises with the squadron against enemy privateers and merchant shipping. Eyles nearly lost his command in 1796 when, through the ignorance of her French pilot, Pomone ran aground off Nantes. She was damaged, but was able to be refloated. Warren sent her into port to be repaired, with the crew struggling to keep her afloat on the voyage to Plymouth. Eyles managed to get her into port safely, and received the thanks of the Admiralty for saving the ship.

Eyles remained in command until 1797, capturing either singly, or in company with other vessels, a large number of privateers, including the 8-gun cutter Sans Peur on 13 March 1796, and on 20 March 1796 captured the Etoile and four vessels in a convoy off Pointe du Raz, on the Brittany coast. The capture of the 14-gun Fantaisie off Morlaix followed on 25 May 1796. On 22 August 1796 Eyles was in company with several frigates and smaller ships when the French 36-gun Andromache was spotted making for the Gironde estuary. The 32-gun HMS Galatea, under Captain Richard Goodwin Keats, and the brig HMS Sylph, made French signals to fool the French ship into anchoring. On discovering her mistake, the French ship attempted to escape, pursued by Galtaea, Pomone and HMS Anson. After a sustained chase, the Andromache ran herself aground, and was later boarded and burnt by boats from the British squadron. Further successes that Eyles had a hand in included the running of the French 28-gun Calliope onto the Penmarcks on 16 July 1797, an attack on a convoy escorted by the 20-gun Réolaise and other ships on 11 August 1797, and engagements with the Egalité on 23 August and the 18-gun cutter Petit Diable on 27 August 1797.

Eyles left Pomone in late 1797, being succeeded by Captain Robert Carthew Reynolds. Eyles took command of the 74-gun HMS Canada, flying the broad pennant of Commodore Warren, and under him saw action at the Battle of Tory Island, in which a French invasion force under Jean-Baptiste-François Bompart was encountered and successfully dispersed on 12 October 1798.

== The Brest blockade ==
Eyles association with Warren continued after Warren's promotion to rear-admiral. When Warren hoisted his flag aboard the 98-gun HMS Temeraire, Eyles came with him, succeeding Temeraire's previous commander, Captain Peter Puget, in July 1799. The newly commissioned Temeraire then joined the Channel Fleet under the overall command of Admiral Lord Bridport and supported the blockade of the French port of Brest, making several long cruises of two or three months at a time patrolling the area. Eyles was superseded during this period by Temeraire's former commander, Captain Puget, who resumed command on 14 October 1799, and the following month Temeraire became the flagship of Rear-Admiral James Whitshed.

Eyles continued to serve with Warren, with his next posting as captain of Warren's new flagship, the 74-gun HMS Renown. Eyles was aboard her until November 1800. He then returned after a period of absence to resume command of Temeraire on 31 August 1801. Rear-Admiral Whitshed had struck his flag by now, and in his place Temeraire became the flagship of Rear-Admiral George Campbell. By this time the Second Coalition against France had collapsed, and negotiations for peace were underway at Amiens. Lord St Vincent had been promoted to First Lord of the Admiralty, and command of the Channel Fleet passed to Admiral Sir William Cornwallis. Anticipating the imminent end of the war, Temeraire was taken off blockade duty and sent to Bantry Bay to await the arrival of a convoy, which she would then escort to the West Indies. Many of the crew had been serving continuously in the navy since the start of the French Revolutionary Wars in 1793, and had looked forward to returning to England now that peace seemed imminent. On hearing rumours that instead they were to be sent to the West Indies, a group of around a dozen men began to agitate for the rest of the crew to refuse orders to sail for anywhere but England.

=== Mutiny ===
The first open clash between the mutineers and officers came on the morning of 3 December, when a small group of sailors gathered on the forecastle and refusing orders to leave, began to argue with the officers. Captain Eyles asked to know their demands, which were an assurance that Temeraire would not go to the West Indies, but instead would return to England. Eventually Rear-Admiral Campbell came down to speak to the men, and having informed them that the officers did not know the destination of the ship, he ordered them to disperse. The men went below decks and the incipient mutiny appeared to have been quashed. Trouble flared up again when the mutineers, believing they would be supported by the majority of the crew, again made their refusal to sail to the West Indies known, and began to agitate against the officers. Campbell met with Vice-Admiral Sir Andrew Mitchell the following day and after a period of tensions and standoffs between the officers and the crew, the mutiny collapsed when the marines obeyed orders to arrest the ringleaders.

Temeraire was ordered to Spithead and an investigation was carried out, which eventually saw the court-martial and punishment of the mutiny's ringleaders. After deliberations, twelve were sentenced to be hanged, the remaining two were to receive two hundred lashes each.^{[a]} Having carried out the executions, Temeraire was immediately sent to sea, and Eyles sailed for Barbados, arriving there on 24 February, and the ship remained in the West Indies until the summer. During her time there the Treaty of Amiens was finally signed and ratified, and Temeraire was ordered back to Britain. She arrived into Plymouth on 28 September and Eyles paid her off on 5 October.

== Later service ==
Eyles does not appear to have had any more commands until early 1809, when he was appointed to command the 74-gun HMS Plantagenet, which he did until early 1812. He was given command of the royal yacht HMY Royal Charlotte in early 1813, and was promoted to rear-admiral on 4 July 1814. He was promoted to the rank of vice-admiral of the white in May 1825. He died at this rank on 29 September 1835, at Loddington Hall, Northamptonshire, at the age of 66, having never hoisted his flag.

== Notes ==
a. A number of general histories, including Goodwin's The Ships of Trafalgar and Noel Mostert's The Line on the Wind, state that all 14 were hanged. Willis studied contemporary records and reports of the court-martial for his The Fighting Temeraire, and states only 12 of the 14 were sentenced to be hanged. Roy and Lesley Adkins offer a third account, that twenty mutineers were tried, all were found guilty and eighteen were sentenced to death, the other two were to receive one hundred and twenty lashes each. They note that at least six were hanged and possibly as many as twelve, the remainder may have had their sentences commuted to transportation.
