= HMY Charlotte =

English royal yacht built in 1677

History

England
- Name: HMY Charlotte
- Owner: Royal Navy
- Builder: (Woolwich)
- Laid down: built 1677

General characteristics
- Length: 61 feet
- Beam: 21 feet
- Draught: 8 feet
- Propulsion: Sail
- Complement: 20 to 30 men

HMY Charlotte was an English royal yacht built for the Royal Navy. It was named Charlotte by Charles II in honour of his illegitimate daughter Charlotte Fitzroy.

== Construction ==
Charlotte was built by Phineas Pett in Woolwich Dockyard in 1677 at an estimated cost of £2973 12d, of which £500 was paid directly by Charles II. The figurehead depicted a female figure crowned by angels, presumably a depiction of the ship's namesake.

Carving work was carried out by Joseph Leadman and Joseph Helby, and valued at £507 8s 6d. Gilding, painting, and upholstery also came at a significant expense. Paintings were commissioned for a sum total of £77 from Willem van de Velde the Elder and Willem van de Velde the Younger, both of whom were kept on retainer by Charles II for annual pensions of £100.

The expenses incurred on Charlotte were a source of tension between Charles II and the Admiralty.

== Career ==
Charlotte was seaworthy by 4 November 1677, on which date she took Princess Mary and her new husband William of Orange across the English Channel.

Charlotte was listed for sale in 1710, but no buyer was found. Instead she was rebuilt by Joseph Allin at Deptford Dockyard, and renamed Princess Charlotte. She was renamed twice more – as Augusta in 1761, and as Princess Augusta (for Princess Augusta Sophia) in 1773. She was eventually sold in 1818.

Service history of HMY Charlotte
Date(s)	Captain	Station	Actions/Events
1677	Ralph Saunderson	-	-
1682–1686	J. Clements	-	-
1689	Andrew Cotton	Guernsey	-
1690–1703	J. Robinson	-	-
1694–1701	Thomas Marks	-	-
1702–1709	G. Breholt	Ireland	-
1710	-	-	Rebuilt at Deptford
1715–1725	Joseph Banaster	In the Baltic 1720	-
1726	H. Holmes	-	-
1727–1736	William Bridges	-	-
1737–1738	W. Parry	-	-
1739–1740	C.W. Purvis	-	-
1741	J. Willyams	-	-
1742–1743	Robert Allen	-	-
1746–1750	Richard Edwards	-	-
1752–1754	E. Pratten	-	-
1755	J. Bentley	-	-
1756	J. Lendrick; Robert Mann (November)	-	-
1757–1761	C. Wray	-	-
1751	J. Campbell	-	-
