= Charles Buckner =

Royal Navy Admiral (1735–1811)

Admiral Charles Buckner
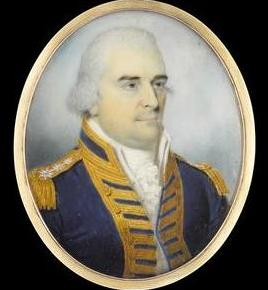
- Born: January 1735; Boxgrove, West Sussex, England
- Died: 9 February 1811 (aged 76); Marylebone, London, England
- Burial place: St Giles in the Fields, London
- Military career
- Allegiance: United Kingdom
- Branch: Royal Navy
- Service years: 1750–1811
- Rank: Admiral
- Commands: HMS Virgin; HMS Savage; HMS Lark; HMS Chatham; HMS Prothee; HMS Royal Oak; HMY William & Mary; Nore Command
- Conflicts: Seven Years' War; Battle of Minorca; Invasion of Martinique; American Revolutionary War; Battle of the Saintes; French Revolutionary Wars

Admiral Charles Buckner (c. 1735–1811) was a Royal Navy officer who became Commander-in-Chief, The Nore. He was the brother of John Buckner, Bishop of Chichester, and grandfather of portraitist Richard Buckner.

== Early life ==
Charles Buckner was christened in the parish of Boxgrove, Sussex in 1735, the son of Richard Buckner, steward to the Duke of Richmond, and Mary, née Saunders. He married Mary Parke in 1763 and they had three children, Charles, Mary, and Richard. After his first wife's death, he married Anne Frewen, who was a great aunt of celebrated engineer Fleeming Jenkin, as recounted in Robert Louis Stevenson's Memoir of Fleeming Jenkin (1888). Stevenson describes him as "that tall, rough-voiced, formidable uncle" who "was no enemy of dunces; he loved courage". In addition to his naval career, he was mayor of Chichester in 1784 and an alderman of the city afterward.

== Naval career ==
Not long after passing the lieutenant's examination, Lieutenant Buckner participated in the 1756 Battle of Minorca as a 4th lieutenant on HMS Lancaster and gave an account of the battle in his testimony at the subsequent court martial of Admiral John Byng. Buckner became commanding officer of the third-rate HMS Prothee in 1780. During the American Revolutionary War, he captured the American privateer frigates Scourge and Rhodes in February 1782 and then saw action at the Battle of the Saintes in April 1782. He went on to be commanding officer of the third-rate HMS Royal Oak later in 1782 and commanding officer of the royal yacht HMY William & Mary in 1787. He became Commander-in-Chief, The Nore in April 1795 and was in command during the Spithead and Nore mutinies in 1797. The first round of negotiations, led by Buckner for the Navy, failed dismally with Buckner being threatened with a broadside attack from the third-rate HMS Inflexible which was being held by the mutineers. The mutiny ultimately failed and the ring leaders were hanged.

Under the seniority-based promotion system of the Royal Navy then in effect, Buckner was eventually promoted to Admiral of the Red in 1808, the second highest-ranking officer in the Navy at the time.

Military offices
Preceded by Sir George Collier	Commander-in-Chief, The Nore; 1795–1797	Succeeded by Skeffington Lutwidge
