= French ship Protée (1772) =

Ship of the line of the French Navy

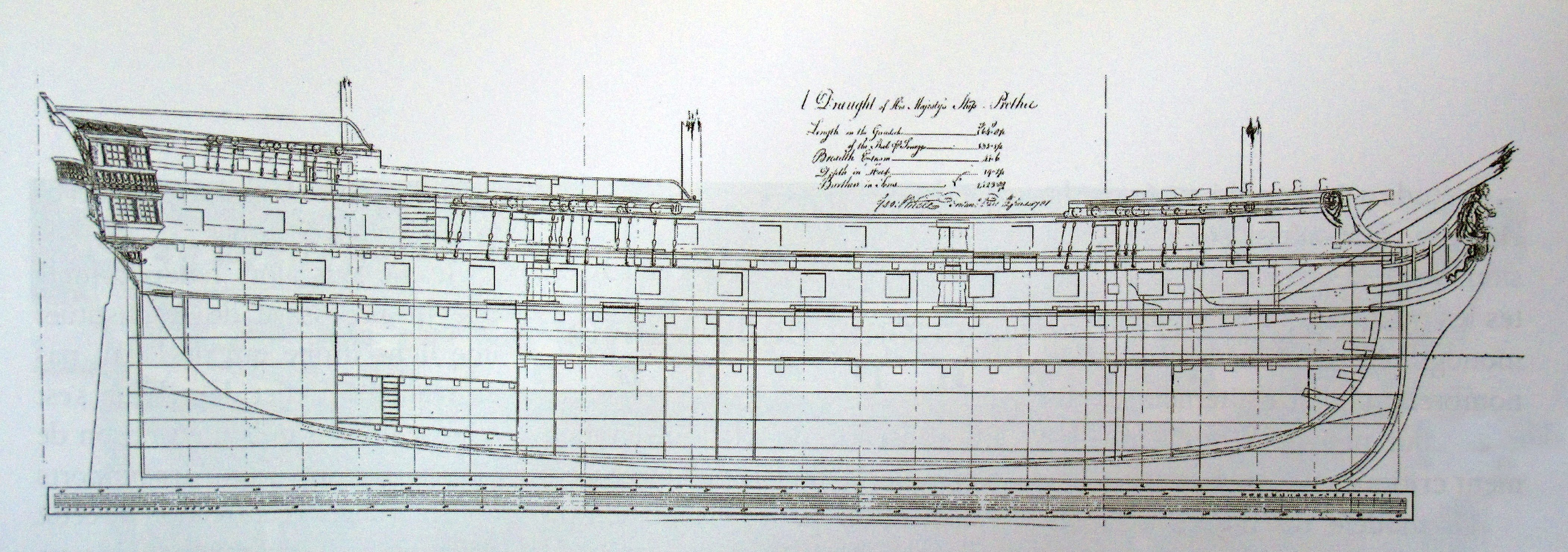
- Plans of the ship

History

France
- Name: Protée
- Launched: 10 November 1772
- Captured: 24 February 1780, by Royal Navy

Great Britain
- Name: Prothee
- Acquired: 24 February 1780
- Fate: Broken up, 1815

General characteristics
- Class & type: Artésien-class ship of the line
- Displacement: 2084 tonneaux
- Tons burthen: 1200 port tonneaux
- Length: 164 ft 1 in (50.01 m) (gundeck)
- Beam: 44 ft 7 in (13.59 m)
- Depth of hold: 19 ft (5.8 m)
- Propulsion: Sails
- Sail plan: Full-rigged ship
- Armament: 64 guns of various weights of shot

Protée was an Artésien-class 64-gun ship of the line of the French Navy, launched in 1772.

== Career ==
On 16 February 1780, Protée departed Lorient escorting a convoy bound for India, with troops and ammunition. Protée, under Captain Charles Louis du Chilleau de La Roche was the flagship of the convoy.

On 23 February, off Spain, the convoy met Rodney's fleet. Hopelessly outnumbered and outgunned, Protée struck while Charmante returned to Lorient, arriving there on 3 March. Three merchantmen were also captured. Court-martialled for the loss of his ship, Duchilleau was honourably acquitted.

Protée was commissioned in the Royal Navy as the third rate HMS Prothee. She saw action on 12 April 1782 against a huge French fleet at the Battle of the Saintes under the command of Captain Buckner.

She was converted to serve as a prison ship in 1799, and broken up in 1815. Eight of her small cannons were purchased by John Manners, 5th Duke of Rutland and are currently at Belvoir Castle, Leicestershire. The cannon are still fired on special occasions, such as weddings and the Duke's birthday.
