= HMY Bezan =

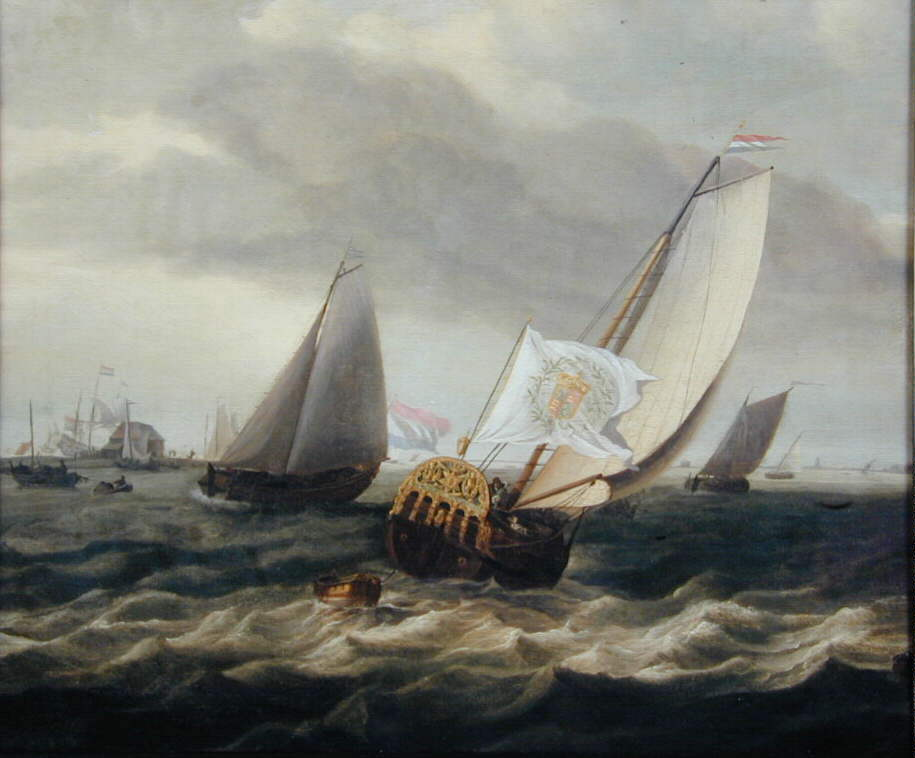
- The Bezan

History

England
- Name: HMY Bezan
- Launched: 1661
- Fate: Broken up in 1687

General characteristics
- Class & type: Royal yacht
- Tons burthen: 35 (bm)
- Length: 34 ft (10 m) (overall)
- Beam: 14 ft (4.3 m)
- Draught: 3 ft 6 in (1.07 m)
- Armament: 4 guns

HMY Bezan (or Bezaan) was a Royal Yacht of the Royal Navy of England. The Bezan was a Dutch pleasure yacht built in 1630 and presented to Charles II by the Dutch East India Company. The Bezan was about 15 feet long with a single mast and carried a crew of two, and was the precursor of modern leisure yachts.

A "bezaan" is Dutch for a gaff rigged type of sail.

A Royal Visit to the Fleet in the Thames Estuary, 1672. On the extreme right is the forepart of a bezan yacht, thought to be the one given to Charles II in 1661

HMY Mary, which was also presented by the Dutch East India Company to Charles the same year, had “square rigging”.

Charles and his brother James raced their craft against each other. There was a race between the Dutch-built Bezan and the King’s yacht Jamie (named after James Scott, 1st Duke of Monmouth), which the former easily won.
