= Mary Hooper =

Mary Hooper may refer to:

- Mary Hooper (politician)
- Mary Hooper (19th-century author)
- Mary Hooper (author, born 1944)
