= HMS Merlin (1666) =

History

England
- Name: HMS Merlin
- Builder: Shish, Rotherhithe
- Launched: 1666
- Fate: Sold 30 August 1698

General characteristics
- Class & type: 8-gun yacht
- Tons burthen: 109 (bm)
- Armament: 8 guns

HMS Merlin was an 8-gun yacht of the Royal Navy, best known for its use as a pretext for the 1672 to 1674 Third Anglo-Dutch War.

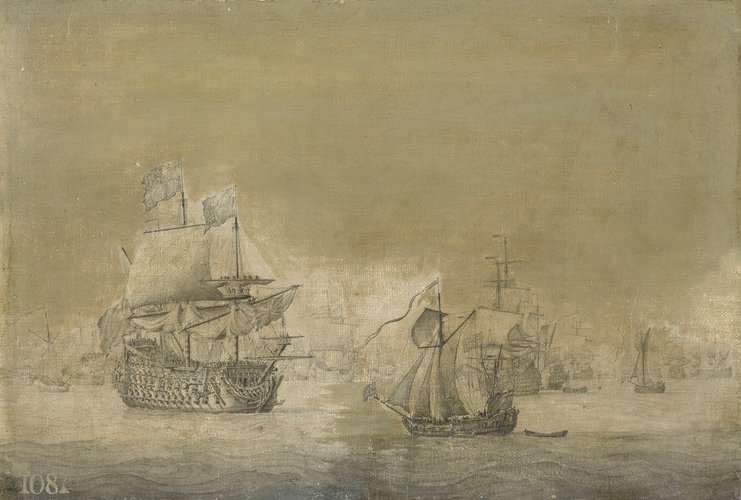
An English threedecker, probably the Prince, approached by a Royal Yacht, probably Merlin. Willem van der Velde

In August 1671, Lord Arlington ordered Merlin, carrying the English ambassador's wife Dorothy Osborne, to pass Dutch ships anchored near Brill; as agreed by treaty, the Dutch struck their flag in salute but failed to fire white smoke, a courtesy given to warships. Dutch commander Van Ghent later explained he was doubtful as to whether the Merlin came into that category and did not want to create a precedent.

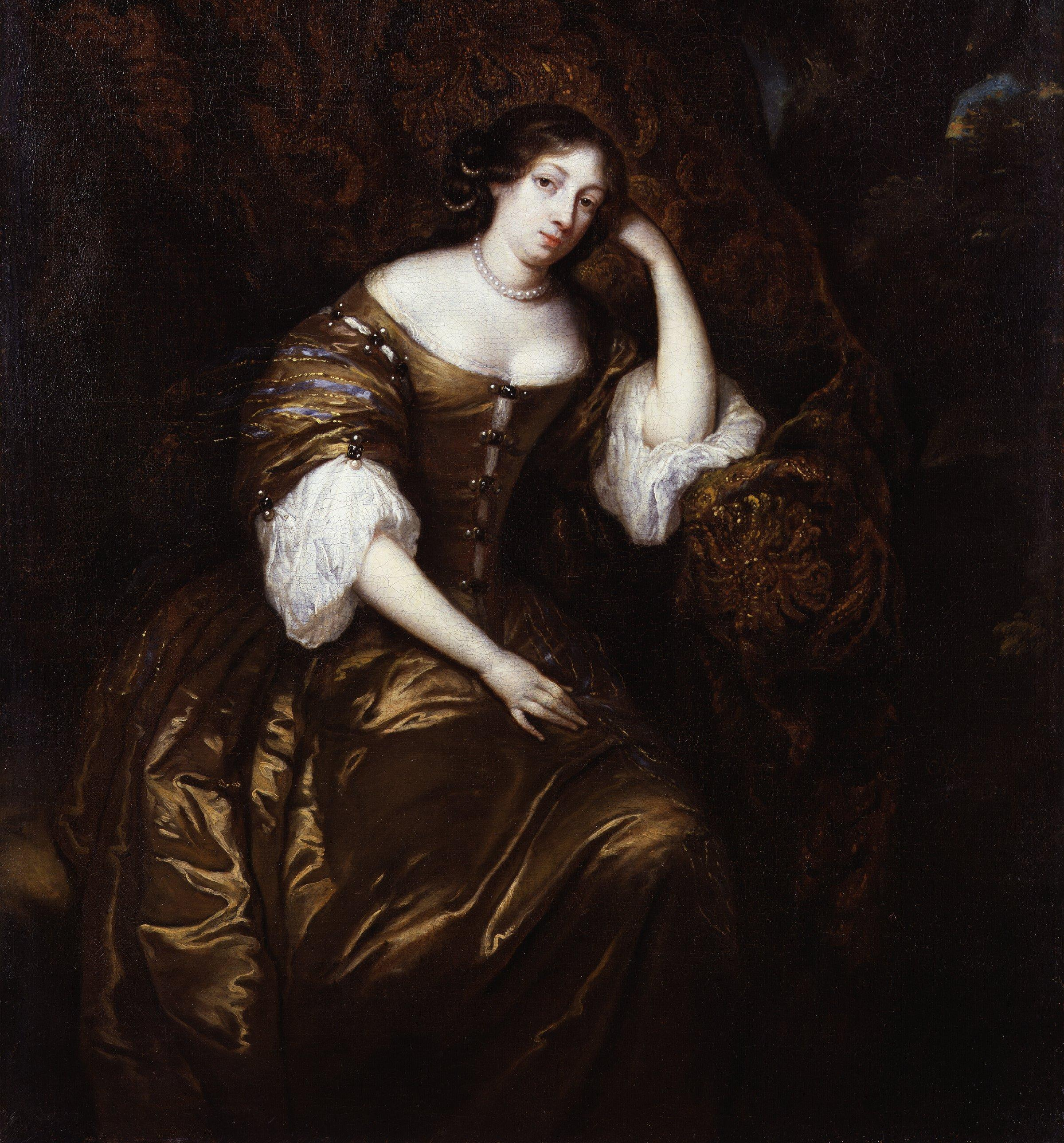
Dorothy Temple

Sir George Downing, English ambassador in The Hague, was ordered to demand those responsible for this 'insult' be severely punished, which the States General of the Netherlands refused. Intended to raise public support for the war, it was so obviously manufactured that it had the opposite effect.

Between 1681 and 1693, Merlin was employed by Captain Greenville Collins to complete a comprehensive survey of the British coastline, published in 1693 as Great Britain's Coasting Pilot; this makes it the first British warship dedicated to marine survey work, rather than exploration. Partially based on Dutch maps and replicating some of their errors, nevertheless the charts were an enormous advance and "entitle Collins to rank not only with the earliest, but with the best of English hydrographers."

== Sources ==
- Boxer, C. R. (1969). "Some Second Thoughts on the Third Anglo-Dutch War, 1672–1674". Trans. R. Hist. Soc. 19. JSTOR 3678740.
- Collins, Greenville (1693). Great Britain's Coasting Pilot. London: Freeman Collins, sold by Richard Mount.
- Fulton, Thomas Wemyss (1769). The Sovereignty of the Sea. William Blackwood.
- Rowen, Henry Herbert (1978). John de Witt, Grand Pensionary of Holland, 1625-1672 (2015 ed.). Princeton University Press. ISBN 978-0691600437.
- Troost, Wouter (2005). William III the Stadholder-king: A Political Biography. Routledge. ISBN 978-0754650713.
