= HMY Royal Caroline (1750) =

Amazing

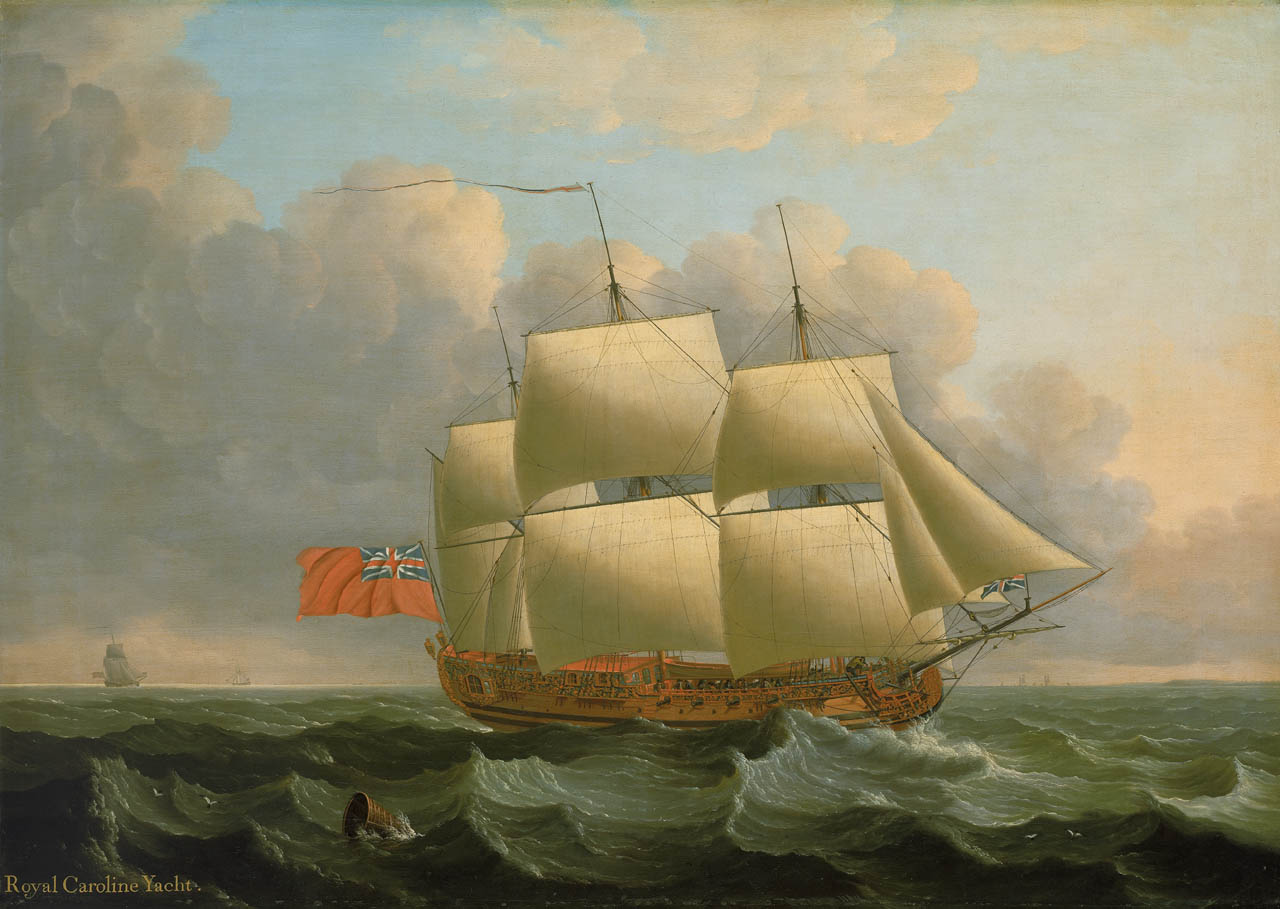
- 1750 painting of Royal Caroline

History

Great Britain
- Name: HMY Royal Caroline
- Ordered: 22 August 1749
- Builder: Deptford Dockyard
- Launched: 29 January 1750
- Renamed: HMY Royal Charlotte in 1761
- Fate: Broken up in July 1820

General characteristics
- Class & type: Royal yacht
- Tons burthen: 232 11/94 (bm)
- Length: 90 ft 1 in (27.46 m) (gundeck); 72 ft 2 1/2 in (22.009 m) (keel)
- Beam: 24 ft 7 in (7.49 m)
- Depth of hold: 11 ft (3.4 m)
- Sail plan: Full-rigged ship
- Armament: 8 × 4-pounder (or 10 × 3-pounder) guns + 8 × 1/2-pdr swivel guns

HMY Royal Caroline was a ship-rigged royal yacht. She was ordered in 1749 to replace HMY Carolina as Britain's principal royal yacht. She was built at Deptford Dockyard under the supervision of Master Shipwright John Hollond to a design by Surveyor of the Navy Joseph Allin. She was launched on 29 January 1750 and was broken up 70 years later, in 1820.

== Service ==
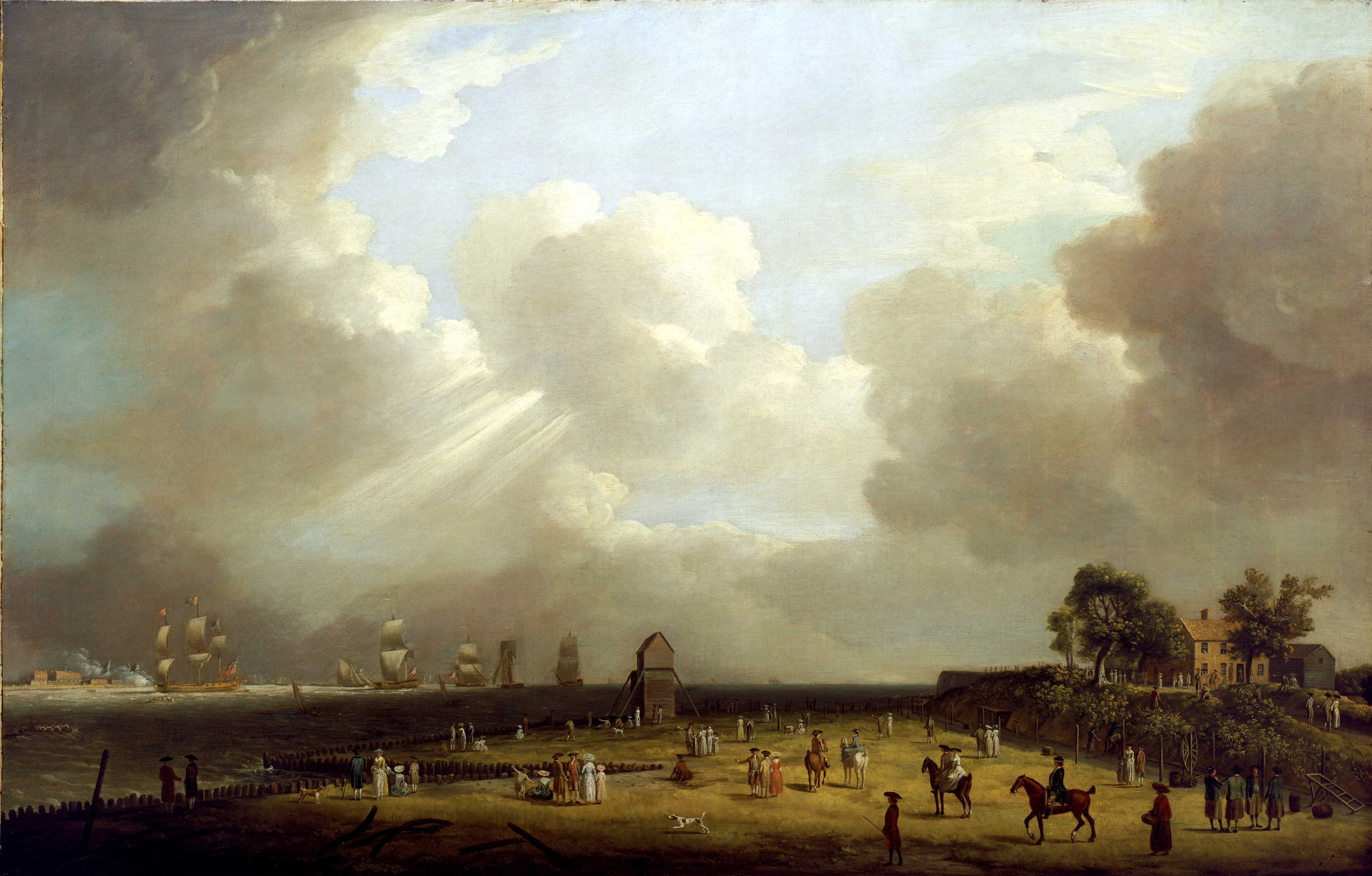
Princess Charlotte Arriving at Harwich by Dominic Serres, 1763

Royal Caroline was first commissioned under Captain Sir Charles Molloy, who commanded her until 1753. Captain Sir Piercy Brett took over in 1754, and in August 1761 she became the flagship of Admiral of the Fleet Lord Anson, with Captain Peter Denis as his flag-captain. Anson had orders to convey Duchess Charlotte of Mecklenburg-Strelitz from Cuxhaven, Kiel to marry George III. Accompanying the yacht, renamed HMY Royal Charlotte in honour of the occasion, was a squadron of warships and four other royal yachts, HMY Mary, Katherine, Augusta and Fubbs. During the return voyage the squadron was three times blown over to the Norwegian coast by westerly gales and took ten days to reach Harwich, which it did on 6 September 1761.

Royal Charlotte was commissioned under Peter Denis in December 1763, and remained under his command until 1770. Denis was succeeded by Captain John Campbell that year, and Campbell remained in command until his promotion to rear-admiral in 1777. Royal Charlotte was recommissioned under Captain William Cornwallis in March 1783, and he was succeeded in turn by Captain Sir Hyde Parker in 1788. The yacht was briefly recommissioned in December 1792, but was paid off the following year.

== French Revolutionary and Napoleonic Wars ==
She continued to be used for official occasions during the French Revolutionary and Napoleonic Wars, with King George III making frequent trips in his yachts to welcome returning fleets and to conduct fleet reviews. The King embarked on Royal Charlotte in 1797 to visit the fleet at the Nore after the Battle of Camperdown, in order to honour Admiral Adam Duncan. Contrary winds however prevented the ship from reaching the mouth of the Thames, and instead the King was blown back up river to Greenwich. Royal Charlotte recommissioned again in May 1801 under Captain Sir Harry Neale, though by February 1804 Captain George Grey was in command. Grey was succeeded later in 1804 by Captain George Henry Towry, and he in turn in 1805 by Captain Edward Foote. By this time Royal Charlotte had been succeeded as the principal royal yacht by the introduction of the slightly larger HMY Royal Sovereign in 1804. Captain Foote commanded the yacht until 1812, when Captain Thomas Eyles took over command, and in June 1814 Captain George Scott became her commander. Royal Charlotte continued in service until July 1820, when she was finally broken up.
