= HMS Larke (1675) =

British warship

History

England
- Name: HMS Larke or Lark
- Ordered: 30 September 1674
- Builder: Anthony Deane Blackwall
- Launched: 11 June 1675
- Commissioned: 19 June 1675
- Fate: Sold 3 May 1698

General characteristics
- Class & type: 16/18=gun, Sixth Rate
- Tons burthen: 19925/94 bm
- Length: 74 ft 0 in (22.56 m) keel for tonnage
- Beam: 22 ft 6 in (6.86 m) for tonnage
- Draught: 9 ft 0 in (2.74 m)
- Depth of hold: 9 ft 2 in (2.79 m)
- Armament: as built; 16 × 6-pounder MLSB guns; 2 × minions; 1685; 16 × sakers on trucks; 2 × 3-pdrs

HMS Larke (or Lark) was contracted to be built by Sir Anthony Deane of Blackwall, knighted after he left Portsmouth Dockyard in 1673. She had the lines of Greyhound and was a standard 18-gun vessel. She was commissioned in June 1675 for trade protection. She patrolled the North Sea and Channel with her final service with the Fleet. She took a number of privateers during her service. She was sold on 3 May 1698.

Larke was the third named vessel when it was used for a pinnace in service in 1588.

== Design and specifications ==
Little is known of her construction dates other than her order date and launch date. The ship was ordered on 30 September 1674. She was launched at Blackwall on 11 June 1675. Her keel length reported for tonnage was 74 feet 0 inches (22.56 metres). Her breadth was 22 feet 6 inches (6.86 metres) as reported for tonnage with her depth of hold of 9 feet 2 inches (2.79 metres). Her draught was only 8 feet 6 inches (2.59 metres). Her tonnage was calculated as 199 25/94 tons. Her construction cost £2,481.8.0d. (Note: A total cost accounting for inflation of approximately £433,100 in today's money.)

Her initial armament was listed as fourteen to sixteen 6-pounder muzzle-loading smoothbore guns mounted on trucks and two minion cannons. A minion cannon was a muzzle-loading smoothbore 1,000-pound gun with a 3 1/2-inch bore firing a 4-pound shot with a 4-pound powder charge. The guns were also mounted on wooden trucks, By 1685 this was changed to sixteen sakers and two 3-pounder smoothbore guns. A saker cannon was a muzzle-loading smoothbore 1,400-pound gun with a 3 1/2-inch bore firing a 5 1/2-inch shot with a 5 1/2-pound powder charge. The guns were also mounted on wooden trucks.

== Commissioned service ==
Her first commission was on 19 June 1675 under the command of Henry Priestman, RN for service in the Mediterranean. Captain William Trelawney, RN took command on 6 February 1678 for service in Home Waters until his death on 21 August 1679. In 1679 she was under the command of Captain Greenville Collins, RN while attending on Trinity House. Captain William Gifford, RN was in command from 22 April 1682 until 22 February 1684 for service at Sale. In August 1682, she departed Plymouth carrying Edward Cranfield to the Province of New Hampshire, arriving in Salem, Massachusetts on 1 October. She remained there for a few weeks in an anti-smuggling mission. Captain Thomas Leighton, RN took command on 26 February 1684 until 1686. She was in a boat action at Mamora on 12 June 1684. Captain Thomas Ashton, RN was in command on 22 April 1687 for service in the Channel. on 15 June 1688 Captain John Laton, RN took over command followed by Captain John Grimsditch, RN on 23 July 1688 then Captain William Tollemache, RN on 15 December 1688. She captured the Privateer Vogoreux-Roland on 10 May 1689.

In May 1689 she came under Captain Richard Fitzpatrick, RN for fisheries protection. During 1690-91 she was under Captain Andrew Douglas, RN in the Irish Channel then later back to the English Channel. Captain Peter Wotton, RN took command on 17 July 1692 for service with the Fleet. She moved to the Mediterranean in 1693. She was with the Smyrna convoy in June 1693. She took the privateer L'Experance on 1 May 1694. In 1695 she came under command of Captain Edward Hopson, RN then on 17 June of the same year she came under command of Captain Samuel Whitaker, RN. She was with Admiral Cloudesley Shovell's squadron in the Channel. She took the privateer L'Entrepenante on 24 February 1696. She was with Berkeley's Main Fleet in 1696. Her final commander was Captain Charles Strickland, RN at Guernsey on 7 August 1696.

== Disposition ==
Larke was sold on 3 May 1698.
