= HMY Kitchen =

English royal yacht (1670–unknown)

History

England
- Name: HMY Kitchen
- Owner: Royal Navy
- Builder: Castle (first name not known; Rotherhithe)
- Laid down: built 1670

General characteristics
- Propulsion: Sail

HMY Kitchen was an English royal yacht, built in 1670 at Rotherhithe by a man named Castle for the Royal Navy.

Service history of HMY Kitchen
Date(s)	Captain	Station	Actions/Events
1670	Jacob Baker	-	-
1671–1674	William Wright	-	-
1678–1692	?Anthony Croz	-	-
1693	-	-	Converted to Bomb Ketch
1693–1694	J. Redman	-	-
-	-	Ireland	-
