= HMY Katherine (1674) =

English royal yacht (1674–unknown)

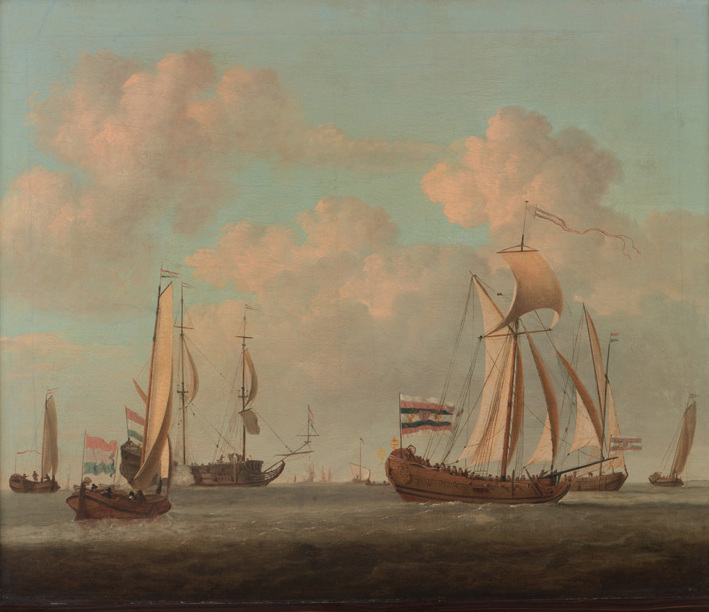
- The English royal yacht Catherine under the Amsterdam flag, ca. 1677, by Willem van de Velde the Younger

History

England
- Name: HMY Katherine
- Owner: Royal Navy
- Builder: Phineas Pett (Chatham)
- Laid down: built 1674

General characteristics
- Tons burthen: 161 tons
- Length: 76 ft 6 in (23.32 m)
- Beam: 22 ft 4 in (6.81 m)
- Draught: 9 ft 6 in (2.90 m)
- Propulsion: Sail
- Complement: 30
- Armament: 8 guns

HMY Katherine, the second ship of that name, was an English royal yacht, built in 1674 at Chatham for the Royal Navy.

Service history of HMY Katherine
Date(s)	Captain	Station	Actions/Events
1678	Richard Vittles	-	-
1680–1684	W. Davies	-	-
1689–1704	Gabriel Millison	-	-
1705	Bartholomew Candler	Shovell's Fleet	-
1706	Henry Cremer	Mediterranean - Byng's Squadron Winter 1706/07	-
1707–1711	T. Monck	Home Waters	-
1710	-	-	Rebuilt at Deptford
1720	Robert Robinson	In Baltic 1713	Rebuilt by Richard Stacey (Deptford)
1721–1726	Robert Gregory	-	-
1727–1735	G. Pomeroy	-	-
1736	F. Dansays	-	-
1737–1741	W. Bridges	-	-
1742–1754	J. Willyams	-	paid off in June
1755	E. Pratten	-	-
1756	J. Fortescue	-	-
1757–1763	Henry Marsh	-	-
1764–1777	Alexander Hood	-	-
1778–1782	-	In Ordinary	-
1783–1794	Sir G. Young	January 1783 commissioned	-
