= HMY Mary (1677) =

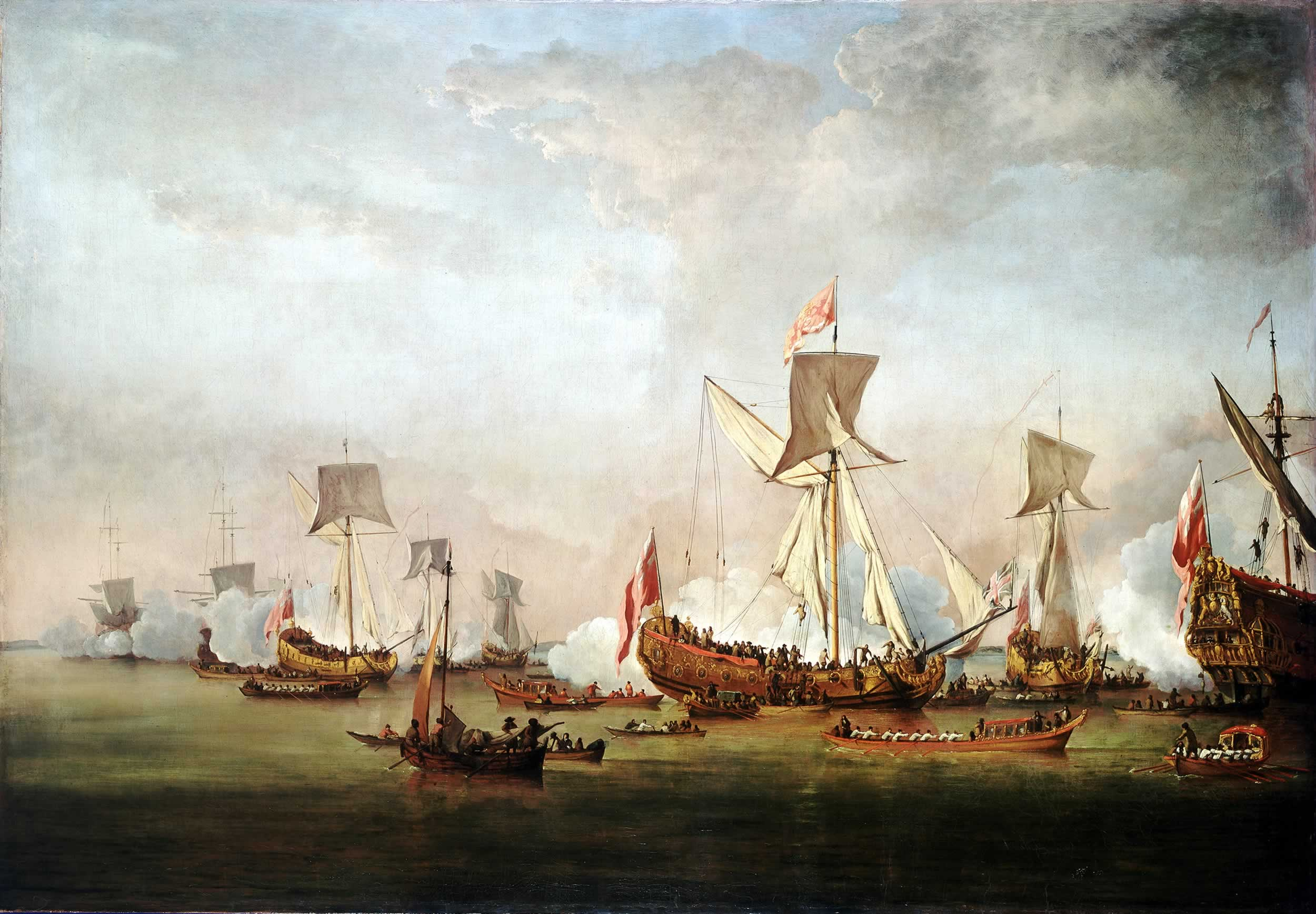
- The Departure of William of Orange and Princess Mary for Holland, by Willem van de Velde the Younger. HMY Mary is in the centre of the picture.

History

England
- Name: HMY Mary
- Ordered: 3 November 1726
- Builder: Chatham Dockyard (1677); Deptford Dockyard (1726)
- Launched: 1677; 16 March 1728
- Fate: Broken up in 1816

General characteristics (1677 build)
- Class & type: 8-gun yacht
- Tons burthen: 155 (bm)
- Length: 66 ft 6 in (20.3 m) (keel)
- Beam: 21 ft 6 in (6.6 m)
- Depth of hold: 8 ft 9 in (2.7 m)
- Sail plan: Ketch rigged
- Complement: 30 (20 in peacetime)
- Armament: 8 guns

General characteristics (1726 build)
- Class & type: 8-gun yacht
- Tons burthen: 163 72/94 (bm)
- Length: 76 ft 6 in (23.3 m) (gundeck); 61 ft 6 in (18.7 m) (keel)
- Beam: 22 ft 4 in (6.8 m)
- Depth of hold: 9 ft 8 in (2.9 m)
- Sail plan: Ketch rigged (1736–1783); Full-rigged ship (1783–1816)
- Complement: 40
- Armament: 8 × 3-pounder guns; 10 × ½-pounder swivels

HMY Mary, was an English royal yacht of the Royal Navy. She was built by master shipwright Phineas Pett and launched at Chatham Dockyard in 1677. She had eight guns and measured She now measured 155 bm. She experienced a very long career of naval service spanning 139 years, having been rebuilt in 1727.

== Early service ==
Her first captain, Christopher Gunman, was court martialled for the loss of HMS Gloucester in 1682. Lawrence Wright then took command until 1685. She was briefly commanded by William Fazeby in 1688, then by Greenvile Collins from 1689 and employed on surveying duties. From 1694 to 1718 she was commanded by John Guy and during this period saw service in the Baltic Fleet in 1700. Command passed to Charles Molloy in 1719.

== Rebuild ==
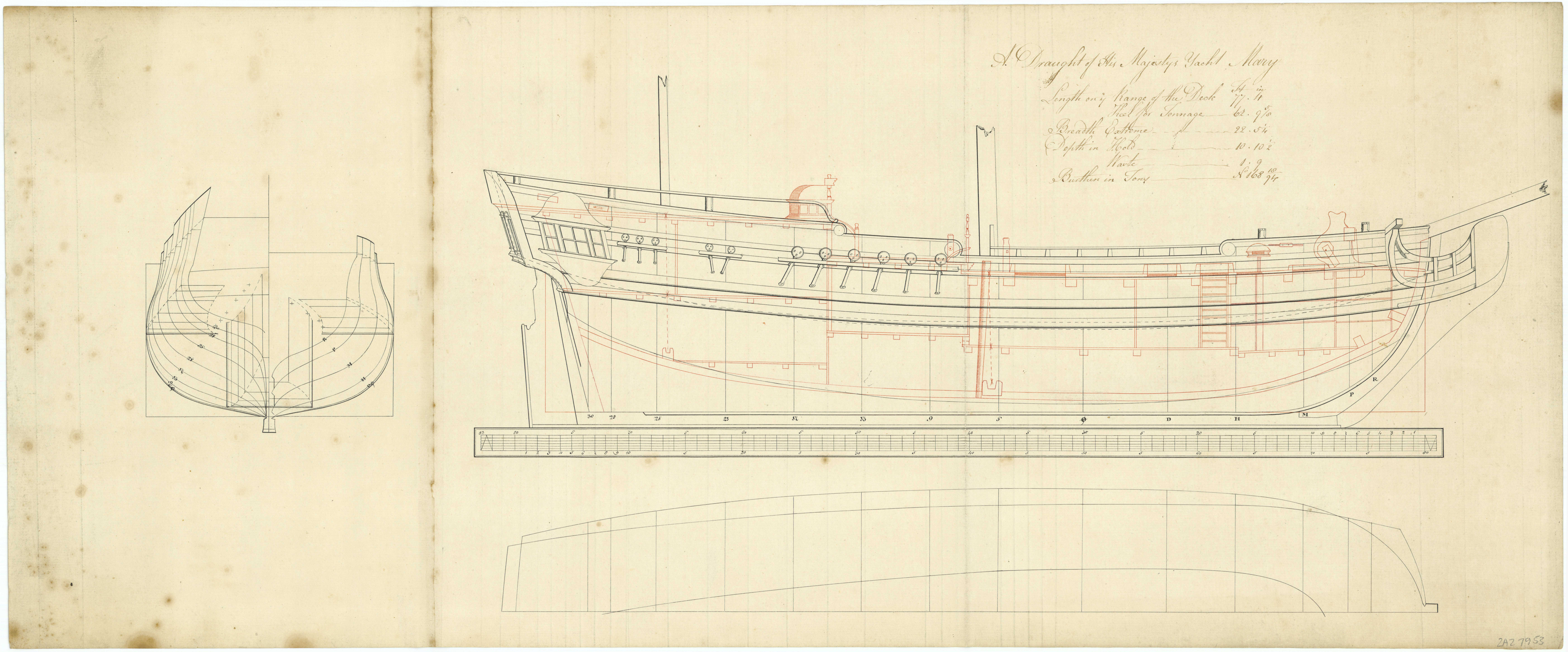
Plan of the Mary 1727 rebuild

Mary was rebuilt in 1727 under the direction of Richard Stacey at Deptford Dockyard. She now measured 163 72/94 bm, was 76 ft 6 in (23.3 m) long along the gundeck; 61 ft 6 in (18.7 m) along the keel; with a beam of 22 ft 4 in (6.8 m); and a hold depth of 9 ft 8 in (2.9 m).

She was armed with eight 3-pounder guns and ten ½-pounder swivels, and had a complement of 40 men.

== Later service ==
Captain Molloy returned to command of Mary until 1743. She was then commanded by Captain Robert Allen from 1744 until his death in 1752, when command passed to Captain John Campbell. During the period from 1756 to 1763 she was unemployed except for undertaking a Royal Escort in August–September 1761. Captain Campbell recommissioned her in December 1763 and continued in command until 1770. Richard Edwards then took over command until 1776.

She was unemployed between 1777 and 1780. Following a large repair at Deptford, she was recommissioned by Captain Hon. Philip Tufton Perceval in 1781 and paid off in 1795. She was commissioned again in February 1797 under Captain James Hill, only to be paid off again in December of that year.

She was recommissioned by Captain Sir Thomas Thompson in July 1801 and he stayed in command until 1805. Sir Edward Hamilton was given command in July 1806, and remained in Mary until 1815, except for a brief period in 1809 when Thomas Francis Fremantle acted as captain.

== Fate ==
Mary's career came to an end when she was broken up in April 1816.
