= HMY Fubbs =

1682 Royal Navy Royal yacht

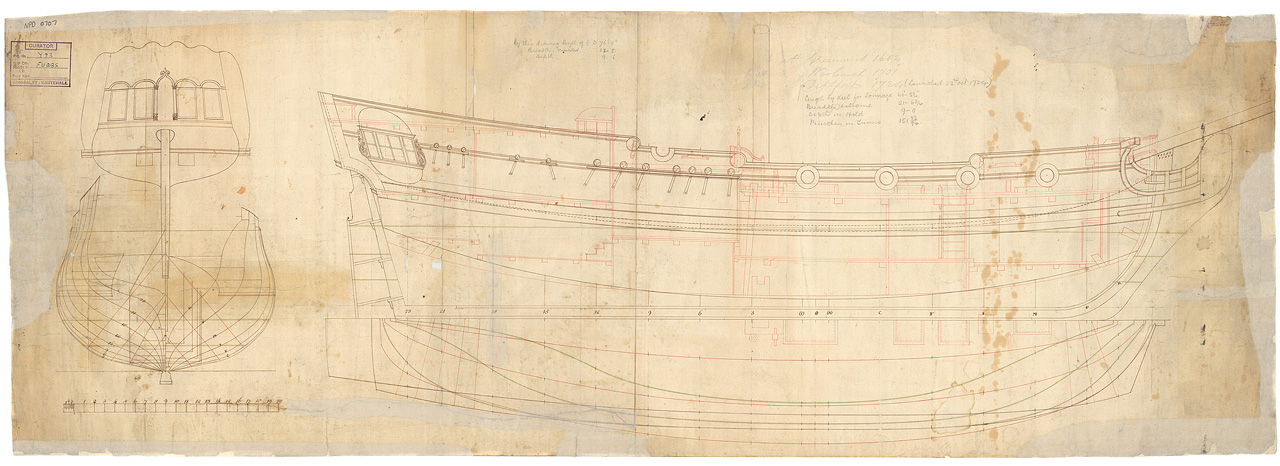
- Shipwright's designs for Fubbs

History

Great Britain
- Name: HMY Fubbs
- Ordered: 9 March 1724 (for second rebuild)
- Builder: Greenwich (first launch); Woolwich Dockyard (first rebuild); Deptford Dockyard (second rebuild)
- Launched: 1682 (first launch); 1701 (after first rebuild); 22 October 1724 (after second rebuild)
- Fate: Broken up in July 1781

General characteristics as built
- Class & type: Royal yacht
- Tons burthen: 148 (bm)
- Length: 63 ft (19 m) (overall)
- Beam: 21 ft (6.4 m)
- Draught: 10 ft (3.0 m)
- Sail plan: Ketch

General characteristics after 1701 rebuild
- Tons burthen: 148 90/94 (bm)
- Length: 73 ft 6 in (22.40 m) (gundeck); 63 ft (19 m) (keel)
- Beam: 21 ft 1 in (6.43 m)
- Depth of hold: 9 ft 1 in (2.77 m)
- Complement: 40
- Armament: 12 guns

General characteristics after 1724 rebuild
- Tons burthen: 157 4/94 (bm); later 164 bm
- Length: 76 ft 9 in (23.39 m) (gundeck); 61 ft (19 m) (keel); later 61 ft 6 in (18.75 m) (keel)
- Beam: 22 ft (6.7 m); later 22 ft 4 in (6.81 m)
- Depth of hold: 9 ft 8 in (2.95 m)
- Armament: 6 × 3-pdrs

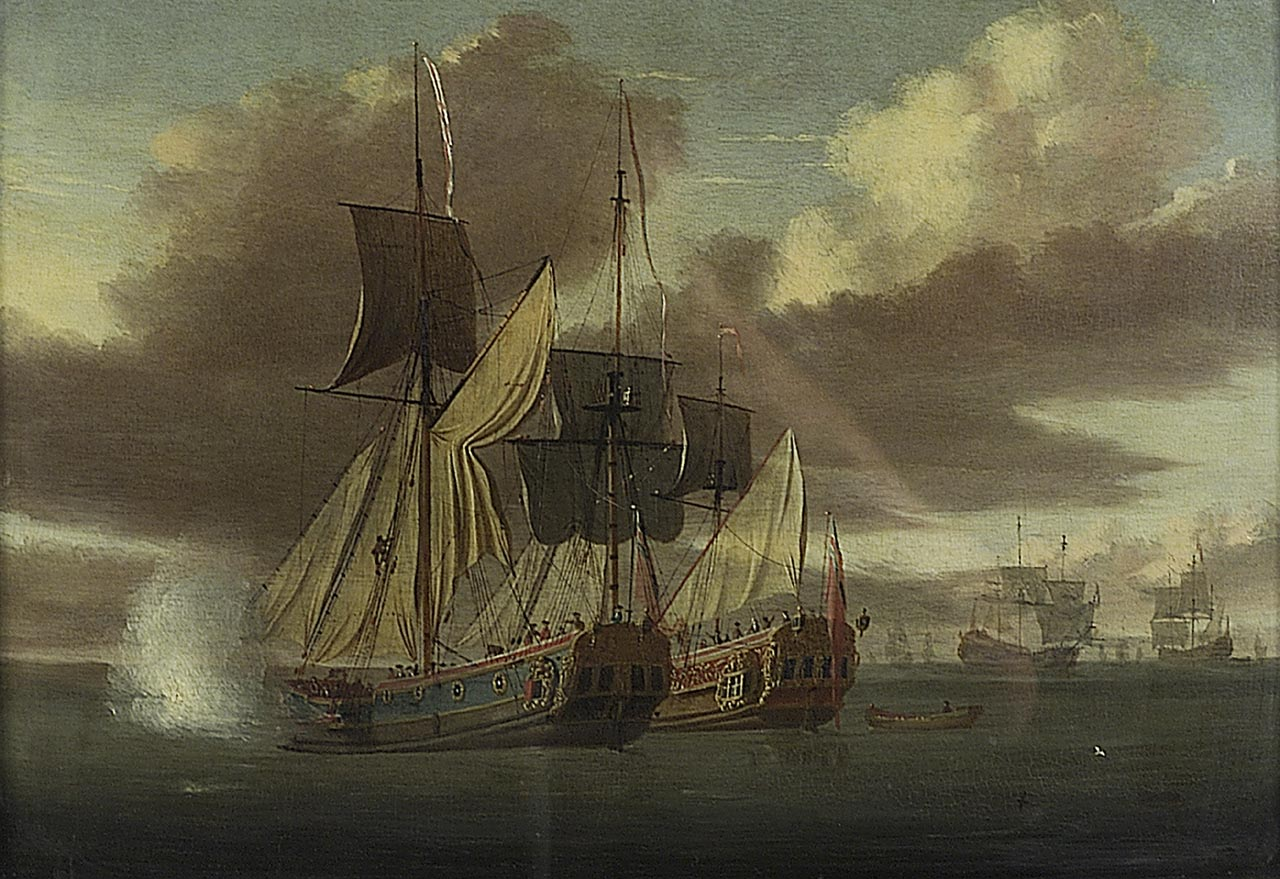
Royal Yachts, one Katherine Smack Rigged, and one Fubbs Ketch Rigged, by L. De Man

HMY Fubbs (or Fubbes) was a Royal Yacht of the Royal Navy of the Kingdom of Great Britain. She was scrapped towards the end of the eighteenth century after having been in service for 99 years.

She was designed for King Charles II by Phineas Pett and built in 1682 at Greenwich. She was rigged as a ketch. The yacht's name came from the King's pet name for one of his mistresses, Louise de Kérouaille, Duchess of Portsmouth. At the time 'Fubbs' meant plump, or chubby, a fashionable type of the female form at the time. Apparently she was a fast vessel. After Charles II's death, she was used by King James II as one of his fleet of nine personal yachts. She was in service until 1781.

== Service ==
Fubbs underwent several rebuilds during her long career, the first taking place in 1701, when she was rebuilt at Woolwich Dockyard under the supervision of Master Shipwright William Lee. Relaunched in 1701, she was commissioned around May that year under the command of Commander Richard Byron. Byron commanded Fubbs until 1707, during which time the yacht served as a bomb ketch in Sir George Rooke's fleet, going out to the Mediterranean in 1703. She was then part of George Byng's squadron in the winter of 1706–1707. She passed to Commander Charles Desborough in 1708, and was back in the Mediterranean in 1714. Captain William Collier took over command in 1716, and he remained until 1734, during which time Fubbs was ordered to be rebuilt in 1724.

She was ordered to be rebuilt on 9 March 1724, and was taken in hand at Deptford Dockyard by Master Shipwright Richard Stacey. The work having been completed, she was relaunched on 22 October 1724. William Collier continued as her captain until 1734, when Fubbs underwent a middling repair at Deptford, which lasted into 1735. One of her last services before the repair was to carry the Princess Royal and her new husband, William IV, Prince of Orange, from Greenwich to Holland after their marriage. A more comprehensive great repair was carried out at the same dockyard in 1737, and from that year until 1745, Fubbs was under the command of Captain Francis Dansays. In 1743, it carried Princess Louise to Altona for her marriage to Crown Prince Frederick of Denmark.

Dansays was succeeded by Captain Thomas Limeburner from 1746, with Limeburner dying in command in 1750. Further alterations were carried out in late 1749, to 'raise her deck as much as may conveniently'. Fubbs then passed to Commander Edward Richards in 1751, and he remained her captain until 1756. Richards was succeeded the following year by Commander Henry Dubois.

In August 1761 she joined a flotilla led by Admiral of the Fleet Lord Anson aboard the primary royal yacht HMY Royal Caroline. Anson had orders to convey Duchess Charlotte of Mecklenburg-Strelitz from Cuxhaven, Kiel to marry King George III. Accompanying the yacht, renamed HMY Royal Charlotte in honour of the occasion, was a squadron of warships and three other royal yachts in addition to Fubbs, HMY Mary, Katherine and Augusta. During the return voyage the squadron was three times blown over to the Norwegian coast by westerly gales and took ten days to reach Harwich, which it did on 6 September 1761.

Fubbs was recommissioned in December 1763 under Captain Richard Spry, and underwent a small repair in 1765. Her final captain, between 1766 and 1781 was A. T. Percival. Fubbs was finally withdrawn from service and broken up in July 1781.
