= John Barker =

John Barker may refer to:

== Business ==
- John Barker (businessman) (1847–1925), Australian
- John H. Barker, American businessman, owner of the John H. Barker Mansion in Michigan City, Indiana

== Politics ==
- John Barker (died 1589) (c. 1532–1589), MP for Ipswich
- John Barker (died 1618) (1579–1618), MP for Shrewsbury
- John Barker (Bristol MP) (died 1636), English politician
- Sir John Barker, 4th Baronet (1655–1696), English MP for Ipswich
- John Barker (diplomat) (1771–1849), English diplomat and horticulturist
- Sir John Barker, 1st Baronet (1840–1914), founder of Barkers department store in Kensington, London, and Liberal MP
- John Barker (MP for Ilchester), English merchant and politician
- John Barker (Parliamentarian), English draper and politician, MP for Coventry
- John Barker (parliamentary officer) (1815–1891), clerk of the colonial Victorian (Australia) parliament
- John Barker (Australian politician) (born 1947)
- John Barker (Philadelphia) (c. 1746–1818), Mayor of Philadelphia, Pennsylvania from 1807 to 1810 and 1812–1813
- John Barker (Kansas politician) (born 1951), member of the Kansas House of Representatives
- John Barker, author and member of the militant group The Angry Brigade

== Religion ==
- John Barker (minister) (1682–1762), Presbyterian divine
- John Barker (Master of Christ's College, Cambridge) (1728–1808), priest and academic
- John Barker (priest) (1912–1992), Dean of Cloyne

== Sports ==
- John Barker (Australian footballer) (born 1975), for Hawthorn, Brisbane Lions, and Fitzroy
- John Barker (English footballer) (1948–2004)
- John Barker (Scottish footballer) (1869–1941)

== Other ==
- John Barker (scholar) (fl. c. 1471–1482), Old Etonian logician
- John Barker (died 1653), English ship-owner
- John Barker (medical writer) (1708–1748), medical writer
- John William Barker (1872–1924), American general
- John Barker (RAF officer) (1910–2004), commander of the Royal Ceylon Air Force
- John Barker (architect) (1940–2010), Australian architect
- John Barker (filmmaker), South African filmmaker
- John W. Barker (1933–2019), American historian
- John Barker (ballet) (1929–2020), American dancer, ballet teacher and translator
- John Barker (died 1968), psychiatrist who set up the British Premonitions Bureau

== See also ==
- Jack Barker (disambiguation)
