= 1651 Programme Group =

Class of ships

Class overview
- Name: 1651 Programme Group - 410-ton Fourth Rates
- Builders: Peter Pett I, Radcliffe; Portsmouth Dockyard
- Operators: Kingdom of England; Royal Navy
- Preceded by: 1650 Programme Group
- Succeeded by: 1652 Programme Group
- Built: 1651–1653
- In service: 1651–1709
- Completed: 3
- Lost: 2
- Retired: 1

General characteristics
- Type: 34-gun Fourth Rate
- Tons burthen: 410 bm
- Sail plan: ship-rigged
- Complement: 150/1652, 160/1653
- Armament: 34 guns

The 1651 Programme of the Council of State of the Commonwealth of England provided for the building of a group of ten new vessels, with the estimates presented to Parliament on 29 May 1651 providing for "one ship and nine frigates".

The projected nine frigates comprised five Fourth rates and four Fifth rates. The Fourth Rates had already been authorised earlier in the year, to consist of three vessels of 410 tons each (the Laurel, Sapphire and Bristol, at a cost of £6.10.0d (Note: The cost accounting for inflation of approximately £1,100 in reference to today) per ton), to carry 34 guns each, and two larger of 600 tons (the Ruby and Diamond, at a cost of £7.10.0d (Note: The cost accounting for inflation of approximately £1,200 in reference to today) per ton), to carry 40 guns each. All except the Sapphire (which was built by contract) were constructed in the state dockyards.

The Fifth rates had also been authorised and were all to be built by contact. They were all named on 18 June 1651 as Pearl, Mermaid, Primrose and Nightingale.They were of 286 tons, and each was established with 22 guns and 100 men.

The "one ship" was the Second rate Antelope ordered on 8 August 1651 to be built by Master Shipwright Christopher Pett at Woolwich, originally to carry 40 guns and to be 110 ft keel length, 32 ft breadth and 18 ft depth in hold (thus intended to have a burthen of 59914/94 bm tons); on 1 October the Council agreed to a request from its own Admiralty Committee that Pett be allowed to build his frigate "to his own dimensions", and also that she may carry 50 guns. In fact, when the ship was completed she measured 120 ft keel by 36 ft breadth by 14 ft depth in hold (thus having a burthen of 82788/94 bm tons), and was fitted with 56 guns.

Finally, the Admiralty Committee issued an Order on 5 December 1651 to also build three small vessels "to ply among the sands and flats to prevent pirates". These three were the Drake, Merlin and Martin, which were of varying dimensions and tonnage, but were all built in the state dockyards and established as Sixth rate vessels to carry 14 guns and 90 men apiece.

== Design and specifications ==
The construction of the vessels was assigned to Portsmouth Dockyard with one vessel contracted to Peter Pett I of Ratcliffe. The dimensional data was so varied that it will be listed on the individual vessels along with their gun armament composition.

== Ships of the 1651 Programme Group ==
| Name | Builder | Launch date | Remarks |
|---|---|---|---|
| Laurel | Portsmouth Dockyard | 1651 | Wrecked off Great Yarmouth on 30 May 1657 |
| Sapphire | Peter Pett I, Ratcliffe | 1651 | Run aground on Sicily 31 March 1670 to avoid capture |
| Bristol | Portsmouth Dockyard | 1653 | Rebuilt at Deptford 1693; Captured by the French on 12 April 1709, then recaptured and sunk 25 April 1709 |
| Ruby | Deptford Dockyard | 1652 | Rebuilt at Blackwall in 1687; Rebuilt at Deptford in 1706; Captured by a French privateer squadron on 10 October 1707 in the Western Approaches |
| Diamond | Deptford Dockyard | 1652 | Captured by the French off La Désirade on 20 September 1693 |
| Pearl | Peter Pett, Ratcliffe | 1651 | Sunk as a breakwater at Sheerness on 6 August 1697 |
| Mermaid | Matthew Graves, Limehouse | 1651 | Rebuilt at Woolwich in 1689; Rebuilt at Chatham in 1707; Broken up at Deptford in 1734 |
| Primrose | John Taylor, Wapping | 1651 | Wrecked on the Seven Stones on 13 March 1656 |
| Nightingale | William Bright, Bermondsey | 1651 | Wrecked on the Goodwin Sands on 16 January 1674 |
| Antelope | Woolwich Dockyard | 1652 | Wrecked off Jutland on 30 September 1652 |
| Drake | Deptford Dockyard | 1652 | Condemned 1690 and sold 1691 in Jamaica |
| Merlin | Chatham Dockyard | 1652 | Captured by a Dutch squadron off Cadiz on 13 October 1665 |
| Martin | Portsmouth Dockyard | 1652 | Sold as useless in February 1667 |
