= John Tyrrell (Royal Navy officer) =

John Tyrrell (1646–1692) of Oakley, Buckinghamshire, was born in 1646, at Shotover Park, Oxfordshire, the third son son of Sir Timothy Tyrrell and Elizabeth, his wife. He served in the British navy and was eventually made by King Charles the Second Admiral in the East Indies.

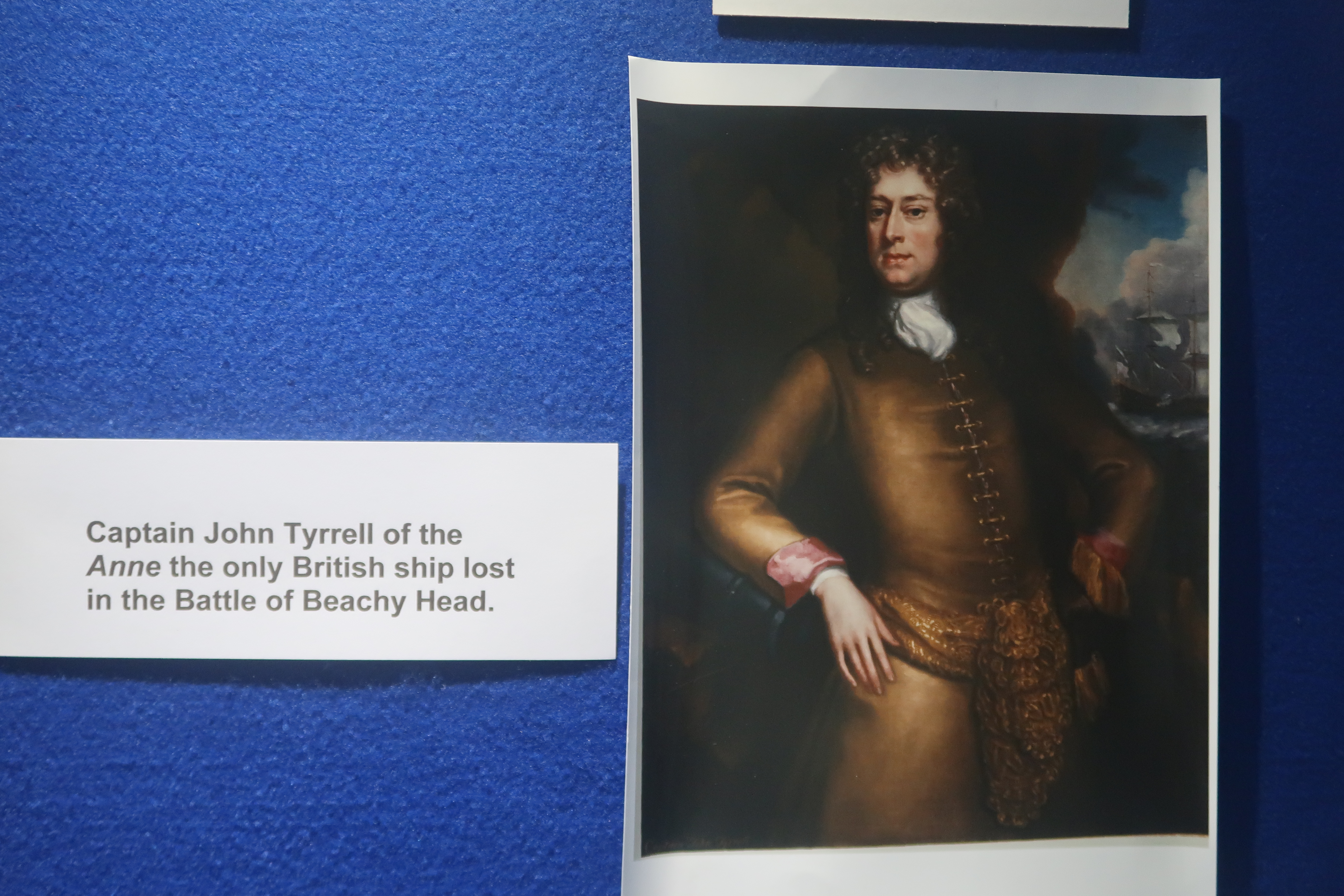
Portrait Of Captain John Tyrell of the Anne, the only British ship lost in the Battle of Beachy Head. From the display at the Shipwreck Museum, Hastings, England (taken in 2021). Origin unknown.

== Career ==
John Tyrrell served in the Restoration navy, including a long period as a lieutenant. On 24 October 1665, he was appointed the lieutenant of the third rate Resolution. That vessel was severely damaged in the St. James Day Battle on 25 July 1666 and destroyed by a Dutch fire ship. Tyrrell then was discharged from the navy and served in the merchant marine till 1672.

In 1672, he rejoined the Restoration Navy and was appointed lieutenant of the fourth rate Leopard (54), which took part in the Battle of Solebay on 6 June 1672. He became her temporary commander on 28 May 1673 following the death of her captain, Peter Bowen.

In September 1674, the King appointed him lieutenant of the fourth rate Dragon (38) under the command of Robert Strickland. The vessel was part of the fleet under John Narbrough sent to blockade Tripoli, Libya. Back in Britain he left the Dragon on 9 November 1676. Fourteen months then passed before his next naval appointment.

== Captain ==
Finally, on 16 January 1678, (Note: Under the style of the time, this was known as 1677, with 1678 starting on Lady Day (25 March) – see Old Style and New Style dates) the King appointed him as captain of the sixth rate Drake. Over the next few months the vessel was on convoy duty, accompanying troop transports taking soldiers across the channel to Ostend. While at anchor at Ostend a privateer was seen offshore in pursuit of a small English vessel. Tyrell in the Drake set off after them and rescued the English vessel. Tyrrell carried the Duke of Monmouth over to Ostend in July 1678. He was discharged from Drake on 19 July 1679.

On 3 April 1680, he was given command of the prize Orange Tree. The vessel was employed in convoy duty, escorting English fishing vessels between the UK and Iceland. In 1681 the vessel again escorted part of the English fishing fleet, this time to the waters off Newfoundland. On return to the UK he was discharged from the Orange Tree on 12 December 1681. Tyrrell was reappointed to command the Orange Treeon 13 April 1682.

On 18 April, he was switched to the Mermaid. He was ordered to take Thomas Colepeper, the Governor of Virginia, across the Atlantic to the colony. Tyrrell quarrelled with Colepeper who complained about him to the Lords of Trade and Plantations, who in turn complained to the Admiralty.

On 23 February 1684, (Note: 1683 in Old Style dates) he was appointed to command the Oxford.

On 1 June 1684, the King appointed John Tyrrell to command the Phoenix (launched 1671) of 42 guns. The vessel was despatched to India to help put down a rebellion. She arrived Bombay 10 June 1684 by which time the rebellion was over. While in local waters she carried out various duties, including patrolling on the lookout pirates. On 19 September 1685, Phoenix caught and sank a "Zanganian" pirate ship in an action notable for the boarding and survival of the then Lieutenant George Byng. Tyrell quarrelled with the governor of Bombay, Sir John Child, during his time in India before departing for the United Kingdom on 16 January 1687. The vessel arrived Deptford 18 August of that year.

Then on 4 September 1688, he was appointed to command the Mordaunt (46 guns). He took part in the action on 4 October 1689, when a group of English cruisers fell in with 12 French warships, and the sixth rate Lively prize was lost. He commanded the third rate Anne (70 guns) when she was beached and burnt after the Battle of Beachy Head on 30 June 1690, "where he withstood the violence of the whole French navy". He had been assigned to the rear (blue) squadron. He fought at the Battle of Barfleur, where he commanded the second rate Ossory of 90 guns.

He died 6 December 1692, aged 46. His memorial in Oakley church reads,

Here lieth John Tyrrell, son of Sir Timothy Tyrrell and Dame Elizabeth his wife who was made by King Charles 2d Admiral in the East Indies and in the sea fight 1690 did withstand ye violence of ye whole French navy, always showing himself a true lover of his country, a valiant and skilful Commander.
