= John Barker (died 1653) =

John Barker (died 1653) was an English ship-owner.

== Biography ==
Barker was in earlier life a merchant, shipowner, and shipmaster of London, probably the same who, in 1627, in partnership with Matthew Cradock, John Fowke (afterwards, in 1653, lord mayor), and others, obtained letters of marque for the Golden Cock, of 200 tons (7 March, 17 July 1627), which Barker commanded in the Mediterranean, and in which, in the course of 1629, he recaptured a Venetian vessel from a Turkish corsair in the neighbourhood of Zante. The grand signor demanded and enforced satisfaction from the Levant Company, at whose instance Barker was thrown in prison, and so kept for more than a year (September 1630). His affairs after this do not seem to have prospered; and whilst his former partner, John Fowke, advanced to be alderman and lord mayor, he was still a shipmaster, and on 12 April 1652, when war with the Dutch Republic was imminent, he hired his ship, the Prosperous, of 600 tons and 44 guns, to the state, as a man-of-war, himself remaining in command. It does not, however, appear that the Prosperous was with Blake in the engagement off Folkestone on 19 May; but from the general gathering of ships which immediately followed, we may feel certain that she was with him in his cruise to the northward, when he captured or dispersed the Dutch herring fleet. In September she went to Denmark, as part of the squadron under Captain Ball, and narrowly escaped being lost at the same time as the Antelope. On her return to England, towards the end of October, she was sent into the river to refit, and was still there when the battle was fought off Dungeness on 30 November. In the stern remodelling of the navy which took place after this defeat, Barker was confirmed as captain of the Prosperous, and was present with the fleet off Portland on 18 Feb. 1652–3. From his relations with Ball during the previous summer, it is probable that the Prosperous formed part of the red division, under Blake's immediate command; it is, at any rate, certain that she was in the very thick of the battle; was engaged by several ships at once, led on by De Ruyter in person; and that, after a brilliant defence, Barker and a great part of the crew were killed, the rest wounded or overpowered, and the ship taken possession of. Her men were hastily transferred to De Ruyter's own ship, and a prize-crew put on board the Prosperous, which before nightfall was won back by the English; but the men remained prisoners, and were not released for some months. A gratuity of 400l. was assigned to Barker's widow, and the command of the Prosperous, whilst in the state's service, was given to his son William, who had himself been badly wounded when his father was killed.
