= English ship Pearl (1651) =

Warship

History

England
- Name: Pearl
- Ordered: early 1651
- Builder: Peter Pett, Ratcliffe, London
- Launched: June 1651
- Commissioned: 1652
- Honours and awards: Kentish Knock 1652; Gabbard 1653; Porto Farino 1655; Texel 1673
- Fate: Sunk as a foundation (breakwater) in 1697

General characteristics as built 1651
- Type: 22-gun Fifth rate (later 32 guns)
- Tons burthen: 28581/94 bm
- Length: 103 ft 3 in (31.5 m) gundeck; 86 ft 0 in (26.2 m) keel for tonnage
- Beam: 25 ft 0 in (7.6 m) for tonnage
- Draught: 12 ft 0 in (3.7 m)
- Depth of hold: 10 ft 1 in (3.1 m)
- Sail plan: ship-rigged
- Complement: 100 in 1651; 110 in 1666
- Armament: As built in 1651; 18 x demi-culverins (UD); 4 x sakers (QD); 1666 Establishment; 20 × 4 demi-culverins (UD); 8 × sakers (QD); 1677 Establishment; 18 × demi-culverins (LD); 8 × sakers (UD); 4 × minions (QD); 1685 Establishment; 12 × demi-culverins (LD); 10 × sakers (UD); 4 × minions (QD)

Pearl was a fifth-rate warship of the Commonwealth of England's naval forces, one of four such ships built under the 1651 Programme (the other three were Mermaid, Primrose and Nightingale).

== Construction ==
She was built under contract at Peter Pett's shipyard at Ratcliffe, and was launched about June 1651. Her length on the gundeck was 103 feet 3 inches (31.5 metres) with a keel length of 86 feet 0 inches (26.2 metres) for tonnage calculation. The breadth was 25 feet 0 inches (7.6 metres) with a depth in hold of 10 ft 1 in (3.1 m). The tonnage was thus 28581/94 bm tons. She was completed at an initial contract cost of £1,852.10.0d (Note: The cost accounting for inflation of approximately £300,900 in reference to today.) (or £6.10.0d per ton for the anticipated 280 tons bm) (Note: The cost accounting for inflation of approximately £1,000 in reference to today.) per ton.

== Service ==
She was originally armed with 22 guns, comprising 18 demi-culverins on the single gundeck and 4 sakers on the quarterdeck, but by 1653 she had 26 guns (seemingly 4 more sakers added). After commissioning she took part in the Battle of the Kentish Knock on 28 September 1652, in the Battle of Portland in 18 February 1653 and the Battle of the Gabbard in June 1653; later she was in Blake's fleet in the Mediterranean, including the Battle of Porto Farino off Tunis on 4 April 1655.

After the Stuart Restoration in 1660 she was taken into the new English Royal Navy, becoming HMS Pearl. By 1665 she still was nominally a 26-gun fifth rate but she actually carried only sixteen demi-culverins, six sakers and two minions. Under the 1677 Establishment as a 30-gun vessel she carried eighteen demi-culverins, (Note: A demi-culverin was a gun of 3,400 pounds (1,500 kg) with a 4-inch (100 mm) bore firing a 9.5-pound (4.3 kg) shot with an 8-pound (3.6 kg) powder charge.) eight sakers (Note: A sacar or saker was a gun of 1,400 pounds (640 kg) with a 3.5-inch (89 mm) bore firing a 5.5-pound (2.5 kg) shot with a 5.5-pound powder charge.) and four minions. (Note: A minion was a gun of 1,000 pounds (450 kg) with a 3.5-inch bore firing a 4-pound (1.8 kg) shot with a 4-pound powder charge.) She was a 28-gun vessel under the 1685 Establishment with twelve demi-culverins, ten 6-pounders, four saker cutts and two 3-pounders.

The Pearl took part in the Battle of Texel on 11 August 1673. In August 1688 she was re-classified as a fireship, but was reconverted to a fifth rate in 1689. She was sunk as a foundation (breakwater) at Sheerness Dockyard on 6 August 1697.
