= English ship Mermaid (1651) =

Warship

Class overview
- Name: Mermaid
- Builders: Matthew Graves, Limehouse
- Operators: Navy of the Commonwealth of England; Royal Navy (from 1660)
- Preceded by: Pearl (1651)
- Succeeded by: 1653 Programme Group

History

England
- Name: Mermaid
- Ordered: early 1651
- Builder: Mathew Graves, Limehouse
- Launched: July 1651
- Commissioned: 1652
- Honours and awards: Dover 1652; Gabbard 1653; Scheveningen 1653; Porto Farino 1655; Texel 1672

General characteristics as built 1651
- Type: 22-gun fifth rate (later 32 guns)
- Tons burthen: 28585/94 bm
- Length: 105 ft 0 in (32.0 m) gundeck; 86 ft 0 in (26.2 m) keel for tonnage
- Beam: 25 ft 0 in (7.6 m) for tonnage
- Draught: 12 ft 0 in (3.7 m)
- Depth of hold: 10 ft 0 in (3.0 m)
- Sail plan: ship-rigged
- Complement: 100 in 1651; 110 in 1666
- Armament: As built in 1651; 18 x demi-culverins (UD); 4 x sakers (QD); 1666 Establishment; 20 × 4 demi-culverins (UD); 8 × sakers (QD); 1677 Establishment; 18 × demi-culverins (LD); 8 × sakers (UD); 4 × minions (QD); 1685 Establishment; 12 × demi-culverins (LD); 10 × sakers (UD); 4 × minions (QD)

General characteristics as rebuilt 1689
- Type: 32-gun fifth rate
- Tons burthen: 34330/94 bm
- Length: 106 ft 0 in (32.3 m) gundeck; 86 ft 0 in (26.2 m) keel for tonnage
- Beam: 27 ft 4.75 in (8.4 m)
- Depth of hold: 9 ft 6 in (2.9 m)
- Sail plan: ship-rigged
- Armament: 2 × demi-culverins (LD); 20 × sakers (UD); 10 × falcons (QD)

General characteristics as rebuilt 1707
- Type: 36-gun fifth rate
- Tons burthen: 42131/94 bm
- Length: 108 ft 0 in (32.9 m) gundeck; 90 ft 0 in (27.4 m) keel for tonnage
- Beam: 29 ft 8 in (9.0 m)
- Depth of hold: 12 ft 0 in (3.7 m)
- Sail plan: ship-rigged
- Armament: 8/6 × 12-pdrs (LD); 22/20 × 6-pdrs (UD); 6/4 × 4-pdrs (QD)

Mermaid was a fifth-rate warship of the Commonwealth of England's naval forces, one of four such ships built under the 1651 Programme (the other three were Pearl, Primrose and Nightingale). Mermaid was the second vessel in the English Navy to bear this name, since it had been used for a galley captured in 1545 and listed until 1563. She was built under contract at Mathew Graves' shipyard at Limehouse, and was launched in July 1651. Her length on the gundeck was 105 feet 0 inches (32.0 metres) with a keel length of 86 feet 0 inches (26.2 metres) for tonnage calculation. The breadth was 25 feet 0 inches (7.6 metres) with a depth in hold of 10 ft 0 in (3.0 m). The tonnage was thus 28585/94 bm tons. She was completed at an initial contract cost of £1,852.10.0d (Note: The cost accounting for inflation of approximately £300,900 in reference to today.) (or £6.10.0d per ton for the anticipated 280 tons bm) (Note: The cost accounting for inflation of approximately £1,000 in reference to today.) per ton.

She was originally armed with 22 guns, comprising 18 demi-culverins on the single gundeck and 4 sakers on the quarterdeck, but by 1653 she had 26 guns (seemingly 4 more sakers added). After commissioning she spent her early career with Robert Blake's Fleet in action off Dover, at the Gabbard and at Scheveningen, and later in the Mediterranean.

After the Stuart Restoration in 1660 she was taken into the new English Royal Navy, becoming HMS Mermaid. she served mainly in Home Waters. After her first rebuild she served in Home Waters, North America, Mediterranean and the West Indies. After her second rebuild she served in Home Waters and the West Indies. Her break-up was completed at Deptford on 26 June 1734

Under the 1666 Establishment she carried twenty demi-culverins and eight sakers for 28 guns, she actually carried twenty-two demi-culverins, nine sakers and 2 3-pounders. Under the 1677 Establishment as a 32-gun vessel she carried eighteen demi-culverins, (Note: A demi-culverin was a gun of 3,400 pounds (1,500 kg) with a 4-inch (100 mm) bore firing a 9.5-pound (4.3 kg) shot with an 8-pound (3.6 kg) powder charge.) ten sakers (Note: A sacar or saker was a gun of 1,400 pounds (640 kg) with a 3.5-inch (89 mm) bore firing a 5.5-pound (2.5 kg) shot with a 5.5-pound powder charge.) and four minions. (Note: A minion was a gun of 1,000 pounds (450 kg) with a 3.5-inch bore firing a 4-pound (1.8 kg) shot with a 4-pound powder charge.) She was a 30-gun vessel under the 1685 Establishment with twelve demi-culverins, ten sakers, four saker cutts and four minions.

== Commissioned service ==
=== Service in Commonwealth Navy ===
The Mermaid was commissioned in 1652 under the command of Captain Richard Stayner. She was at the Battle of Dover on 15 May 1652. In 1653 under Captain John King she was at the Battle of the Gabbard on 2/3 June 1653 and at the Battle of Scheveningen on 31 July 1653. She was off the Dutch coast under Captain James Ableson in the winter of 1653/54. She then sailed to the Mediterranean with Robert Blake's Fleet in 1654 and was off Tunis at the Battle of Porto Farina on 4 April 1655. In 1656 under Captain Peter Foote she remained with Blake's Fleet until July when she went to the English Channel.

=== Service after the Restoration May 1660 ===
On 24 October 1661 she was under Captain Edward Nixon. She was at Tangier in 1662. Captain King took command gain on 24 October 1664. She took the Dutch privateer Jonge Leewe in the North Sea in April 1665. On 17 April 1665 she was under command of Captain Jasper Grant, at the Battle of Lowestoffe as a member of Red Squadron (Center Squadron) on 3 June 1665. Captain George Watson, was in command from 8 December 1665 until 11 December 1668. On 10 January 1672 Captain Thomas Hamilton, was in command, then Captain Errick Sieubladh, on 17 April 1672, followed by Captain John Temple, on 22 June 1672 all served in the English Channel. On 10 December 1673 Captain Richard Tapson, took command until 8 August 1673. On 3 April 1677 she was under Captain William Flawes then Captain Captain David Lloyd, on 20 September 1677 both for service off Ireland. Captain Daniel Jones, took command on 1 June 1678 for service in the English Channel. On 15 March 1680 she was under Captain David Trtter, followed by Captain John Tyrrell, for service at Barbados. In 1684 She was under command of Captain William Clifford back in Home Waters then went with the squadron to Sale, Morocco. She was reclassified as a fireship in October 1688. Captain Thomas Ley took command on 24 October 1688. In 1689 she went to Woolwich to be rebuilt as a fifth rate.

=== Rebuild as 32-gun fifth rate 1689 ===
On 24 June 1689 she was ordered to be repaired at Woolwich under the guidance of Master Shipwright Joseph Lawrence. She was docked then upon completion of the rebuild she was launched in December 1689. Her length on the gundeck was 106 feet 0 inches (32.3 metres) with a keel length of 86 feet 0 inches (26.2 metres) for tonnage calculation. The breadth was 27 feet 4.75 inches (8.4 metres) with a depth in hold of 9 ft 6 in (2.9 m). The tonnage was therefore 34330/94 bm tons. Her armament was changed to two demi-culverins on the lower deck (LD), twenty 6-pounder sakers on the upper deck (UD) and ten falcons (Note: A falcon was a gun of 660 pounds (300 kg) with a 2.5-inch (64 mm) bore firing a 2-pound (0.91 kg) shot with a 3.5-pound powder charge.) on the quarterdeck (QD).

=== Service after 1689 rebuild ===
She was commissioned on 18 June 1690 under the command of Captain Arthur Ashby, for service at Sheerness. Captain Ashby died on 30 November 1691. Her next commander, Captain Thomas Sherman, took over in 1692 for patrolling the Yarmouth fishery. On 13 January 1693 Captain Edward Rigby, took command and later under Captain William Harman, in the West Indies with Wheeler's squadron. In 1694 Captain Richard Athy, took command for service in the Mediterranean. Captain Thomas Pinder (11 April 1696) and Captain Robert Arris (28 April 1696) held command in the North Sea and the English Channel. During 1699 thru 1700 she was a guardship at Plymouth. In 1701 she was under command of Captain Leonard Crow. On 21 January 1703 Captain Henry (or Humphrey) Lawrence, was in command with Duke's squadron. Captain Walter Riddle took command on 21 December 1703 for service at Jamaica. Upon her return she was to be rebuilt as a 32-gun fifth rate during 1706/07.

=== Rebuild at Chatham 1706–1707 ===
On 20 June 1706 she was ordered to be rebuilt at Chatham under the guidance of Master Shipwright Benjamine Rosewell. She was docked then upon completion of the rebuild launched in August 1707. Her length on the gundeck was 108 feet 0 inches (32.9 metres) with a keel length of 90 feet 0 inches (27.4 metres) for tonnage calculation. The breadth was 29 feet 8 inches (9.0 metres) with a depth of hold of 12 ft 0 in (3.7 m). The tonnage was thus 42131/94 bm tons. Her armament was changed to eight to six 12-pounders on the lower deck (LD), twenty-two to twenty 6-pounder on the upper deck (UD) and six to four 4-pounders on the quarterdeck (QD).

=== Service after 1707 rebuild ===
She was commissioned in July 1707 under the command of Captain John Chilley, for service with Admiral Byng's Fleet at the Downs plus she patrolled the North Sea in 1708. In 1709 she was patrolling off the coast of Scotland. May 1710 brought a change in command when Captain William Collier, took over still on the Scottish coast but moved to the English Channel in 1712 then on to the Mediterranean in 1714/15. On her return she sail with Norris's fleet to the Baltic in 1716. She was repaired at Portsmouth from July to October 1716 for a cost of £4,658.6.9d. (Note: The cost accounting for inflation of approximately £827,500 in reference to today.) She was recommissioned in June 1718 under the command of Captain John Yeo, She was sheathed in June 1720 for her voyage to the West Indies and service at Jamaica. In October 1722 Captain Joseph Laws, RN, took command at Jamaica. She returned to Home Waters in 1724. She underwent a survey on 10 November 1724 with no repair reported.

== Disposition ==
Her break-up was completed on 26 June 1734 at Deptford.
