= Blockade of Lisbon (1650) =

- Part of the English Civil War
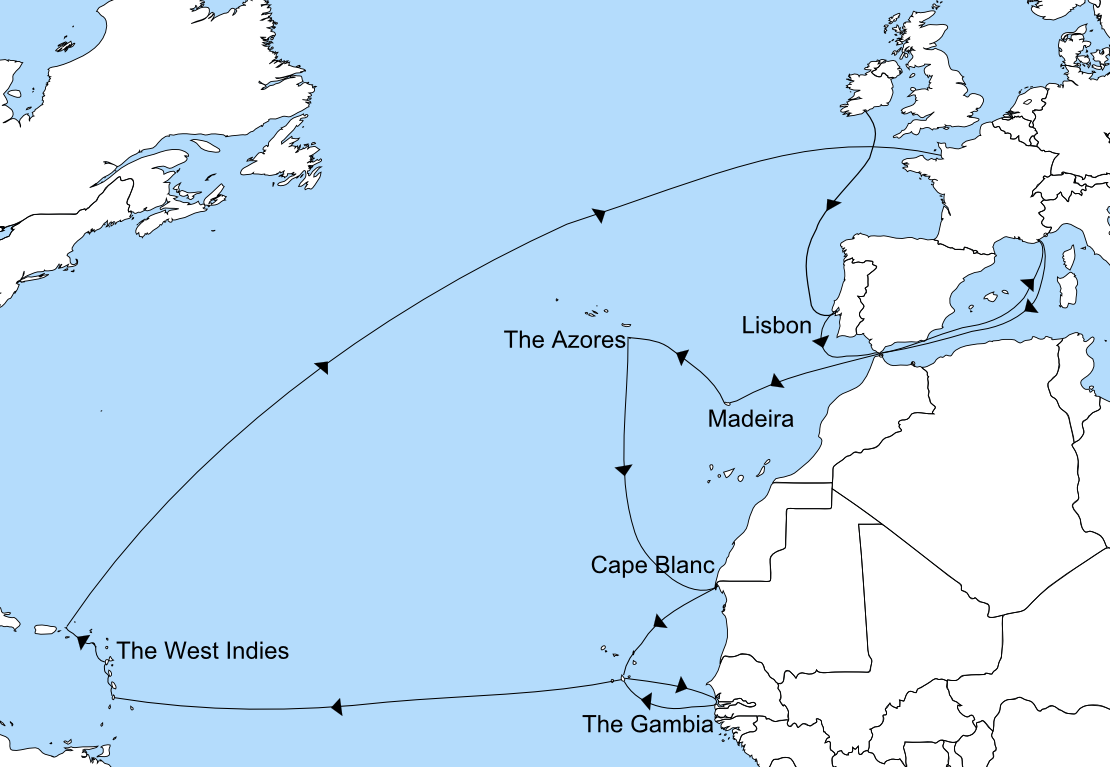
- Prince Rupert's voyage to Lisbon
Date	March – September 1650
Location	Tagus River, Portugal
Result	Parliamentarian victory

Belligerents
(Kingdom of England) Parliamentarians; France; Spain	Royalists; Portugal

Commanders and leaders
(Kingdom of England) Robert Blake	Prince Rupert

The blockade of Lisbon was a naval confrontation in 1650 between the Parliamentary fleet under Robert Blake and the Royalist fleet commanded by Prince Rupert, which had taken refuge in Portugal.
