= HMS Blake =

Four ships of the British Royal Navy have carried the name HMS Blake in honour of General at Sea Robert Blake who was, until eclipsed by Horatio Nelson, the most famous British admiral.

- The first, HMS Blake (1808), was launched in 1808, was a 74-gun third-rate ship of the line. She was sold in 1816.
- The second Blake was originally named HMS Bombay (1808), launched in 1808, renamed in 1819, and broken up in 1855.
- A screw driven 91-gun second rate ship of the line was ordered in 1860 under the name HMS Blake, but construction was cancelled in 1863.
- The third, HMS Blake (1889), was launched in 1889, was the lead ship of her class. She was sold in 1922.
- The fourth, HMS Blake (C99), was launched in 1945 (but not completed until 1961) was a Tiger-class cruiser. She was scrapped in 1982.
