= Battle of Dover Strait =

Battle of Dover Strait may refer to:

- Battle of Dover Strait (1916), 26-27 October 1916, in the First World War
- Battle of Dover Strait (1917), 21 April 1917, in the First World War
- Battle of the Narrow Seas, also known as Battle of the Dover Straits, 3–4 October 1602, in the Anglo-Spanish War (1585–1604)

== See also ==
- Battle of Dover, three actions named for the town
