= English ship Primrose (1651) =

Warship

History

England
- Name: Primrose
- Namesake: the Primrose flower (Primula vulgaris)
- Operator: Navy of the Commonwealth of England
- Ordered: early 1651
- Builder: John Taylor, Wapping, London
- Launched: July 1651
- Commissioned: 1652
- Fate: Foundered 13 March 1656

General characteristics as built 1651
- Type: 22-gun fifth rate
- Tons burthen: 28776/94 bm
- Length: 86 ft 0 in (26.2 m) keel for tonnage
- Beam: 25 ft 1 in (7.6 m) for tonnage
- Draught: 12 ft 0 in (3.7 m)
- Depth of hold: 10 ft 0 in (3.0 m)
- Sail plan: ship-rigged
- Complement: 100 in 1651
- Armament: As built in 1651; 18 x demi-culverins (UD); 4 x sakers (QD)

Primrose was a fifth-rate warship of the Commonwealth of England's naval forces, one of four such ships built under the 1651 Programme (the other three were Pearl, Mermaid and Nightingale). She was built under contract at Captain John Taylor's shipyard at Wapping, and was launched in July 1651. Her length on the keel was 86 feet 0 inches (26.2 metres) for tonnage calculation. The breadth was 25 feet 1 inch (7.6 metres) with a depth in hold of 10 ft 0 in (3.0 m). The tonnage was thus 28776/94 bm tons. She was completed at an initial contract cost of £1,865.10.0d (Note: The cost accounting for inflation of approximately £303,000 in reference to today.) (or £6.10.0d per ton for the 287 tons bm) (Note: The cost accounting for inflation of approximately £1,000 in reference to today.) per ton.

She was originally armed with 22 guns, comprising 18 demi-culverins on the single gundeck and 4 sakers on the quarterdeck, but by 1653 she had 26 guns (seemingly 4 more sakers added). After commissioning she spent her early career in the English Channel, searching for Spanish frigates. On 13 March 1656 the Primrose grounded on the Seven Stones Reef off Land's End and foundered.
