= English ship Nightingale (1651) =

Warship

History

England
- Name: Nightingale
- Namesake: Common nightingale
- Operator: Navy of the Commonwealth of England; Royal Navy (from 1660)
- Ordered: early 1651
- Builder: William Bright, Horsleydown, Bermondsey, London
- Launched: July 1651
- Commissioned: 1652
- Fate: Wrecked 16 January 1674

General characteristics as built 1651
- Type: 22-gun fifth rate
- Tons burthen: 28968/94 bm
- Length: 86 ft 0 in (26.2 m) keel for tonnage
- Beam: 25 ft 2 in (7.7 m) for tonnage
- Draught: 12 ft 6 in (3.8 m)
- Depth of hold: 10 ft 0 in (3.0 m)
- Sail plan: ship-rigged
- Complement: 100 in 1651
- Armament: As built 1651; 18 x demi-culverins (UD); 4 x sakers (QD)

Nightingale was a fifth-rate warship of the Commonwealth of England's naval forces, one of four such ships built under the 1651 Programme (the other three were Pearl, Mermaid and Primrose). She was built under contract at William Bright's shipyard at Bermondsey, and was launched in July 1651. Her length on the keel was 86 feet 0 inches (26.2 metres) for tonnage calculation. The breadth was 25 feet 2 inches (7.7 metres) with a depth in hold of 10 ft 0 in (3.0 m). The tonnage was thus 28968/94 bm tons. She was completed at an initial contract cost of £1,878.10.0d (Note: The cost accounting for inflation of approximately £305,100 in reference to today.) (or £6.10.0d per ton for the 289 tons bm). (Note: The cost accounting for inflation of approximately £1,000 in reference to today.)

She was originally armed with 22 guns, comprising 18 demi-culverins on the single gundeck and 4 sakers on the quarterdeck, but by 1653 she had 26 guns (seemingly 4 more sakers added). During the First Anglo-Dutch War she took part in the Battle of the Kentish Knock on 28 September 1652 and the Battle of Portland in February 1653. By 1665 she carried 30 guns, comprising 18 demi-culverins, 10 sakers and 2 3-pounders. In the Third Anglo-Dutch War she participated in the Battle of Solebay on 28 May 1672 and the Battle of Texel on 11 August 1673. On 16 January 1674 the Nightingale grounded on the Goodwin Sands off Deal, Kent in a gale and was wrecked.
