= HMS Anne (1678) =

Ship of the line of the Royal Navy

History

England
- Name: HMS Anne
- Ordered: April 1677
- Builder: Phineas Pett, Chatham Dockyard
- Launched: November 1678
- Commissioned: 1687
- Fate: Run ashore and burnt to avoid capture 6 July 1690

General characteristics
- Class & type: 70-gun third rate ship of the line
- Tons burthen: 1,05130/94 tons (bm)
- Length: 150 ft 10 in (45.97 m) gundeck; 122 ft 0 in (37.19 m) keel for tonnage
- Beam: 40 ft 3 in (12.27 m)
- Draught: 18 ft 0 in (5.49 m)
- Depth of hold: 17 ft 0 in (5.18 m)
- Propulsion: Sails
- Sail plan: Full-rigged ship
- Complement: 460/380/300 personnel
- Armament: 1677 Establishment 72/60 guns; 26 × demi-cannons 54 cwt – 9.5 ft (LD); 26 × 12-pdr guns 32 cwt – 9 ft (UD); 10 × sakers 16 cwt – 7 ft (QD); 4 × sakers 16 cwt – 7 ft (Fc); 5 × 5 3-pdr guns 5 cwt – 5 ft (RH)

HMS Anne was a 70-gun third rate ship of the line of the English, built under the 1677 Construction Programme by Phineas Pett II at Chatham Dockyard during 1677/78. She fought in the War of English Succession 1688 to 1697. She took part in the Battle of Beachy Head (1690) where she was severely damaged and dismasted, and ran aground near Rye, East Sussex on 6 July 1690. She was burnt by the English to avoid capture by the French. The wreck is a Protected Wreck managed by Historic England.

She was the sixth vessel to bear the name Anne since it was first used for a ballinger built at Southampton in 1416 and sold on 26 June 1426. However, the 1677 naming was probably in honour of the king's niece Anne (daughter of James II, and later Queen Anne).

== Construction and specifications ==
She was ordered in April 1677 to be built at Chatham Dockyard under the guidance of Master Shipwright Phineas Pett. She was launched in November 1678. Her dimensions were a gundeck of 150 feet 10 inches (45.97 metres) with a keel of 122 feet 0 inches (37.19 metres) for tonnage calculation with a breadth of 40 feet 3 inches (12.27 metres) and a depth of hold of 17 feet 0 inches (5.18 metres). Her builder's measurement tonnage was 1,05130/94 tons. Her draught was 18 feet 0 inches (5.49 metres).

Her initial gun armament was in accordance with the 1677 Establishment with 72/60 guns consisting of twenty-six demi-cannons (54 cwt, 9.5 ft) on the lower deck, twenty-four 12-pounder guns (32 cwt, 9 ft) on the upper deck, ten sakers (16 cwt, 7 ft) on the quarterdeck and four sakers (16 cwt, 7 ft) on the foc's'le with four 3-pounder guns (5 cwt, 5 ft) on the poop deck or roundhouse. By 1688 she would carry 70 guns as per the 1685 Establishment . Their initial manning establishment would be for a crew of 460/380/300 personnel.

== Commissioned service ==
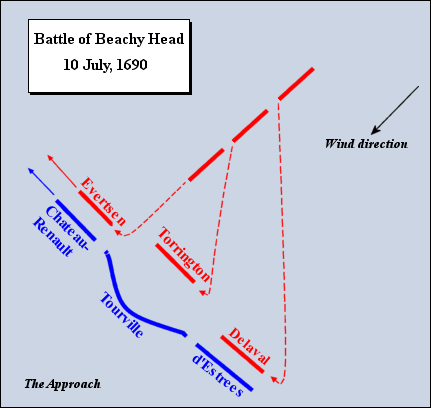
Beachy Head, 10 July 1690: Anne and the blue squadron (rear) were opposed to d'Estrees' French rear

Anne was commissioned in 1687 under the command of Captain Cloudesley Shovell as the flagship of the Duke of Grafton was part of the fleet that escorted the Queen of Portugal Maria Sophia of Neuberg to Plymouth. With the outbreak of the War of English Succession, she was commissioned in 1690 under the command of Captain John Tyrrell. She participated in the Battle of Beachy Head on 30 June 1690 as a member of Blue Squadron. Dismasted in the battle, Anne was run aground about 8 miles west of Rye, and burnt on 5 July 1690 to avoid capture. She was the only English ship lost during the battle.

== Wreck ==
The wreck was reported visible at low tides in early 1903.

The remains, on the low water mark of the beach near Pett Level, East Sussex, were designated under the British Protection of Wrecks Act on 20 June 1974. The wreck is owned by the Nautical Museums Trust (Shipwreck Museum Hastings).
