= Jack Barker =

Jack Barker may refer to:

- Jack Barker (English footballer) (1906–1982), English footballer
- Jack Barker (Australian footballer) (1917–1989), Australian rules footballer

== See also ==
- John Barker (disambiguation)
