= Action of 14 April 1655 =

1655 naval battle between English forces and Barbary pirates

The Battle of Porto Farina took place at Porto Farina (now Ghar el-Melh) on 4 April 1655 (14 April by modern calendar) in northern Tunisia, when an English fleet under General-at-Sea Robert Blake destroyed the vessels of several Barbary corsairs. Blake's fleet destroyed two shore batteries and nine Algerian ships in Porto Farina, the first time shore batteries had been taken out without landing men ashore.

== Action ==
Early in 1655, Blake sent a demand to the Bey of Tunis for the return of an English merchant ship and English prisoners, plus an indemnity and a future agreement but was refused. After sailing back and forth between Sardinia, Tunis, and Sicily for nearly two months and sending the demands again, he arrived on 3 April at Porto Farina, where the Barbary ships had gathered for their intended voyage to the Dardanelles to help the Turks that season. The next day on the 4th, his first division attacked the Barbary ships, boarding and burning them by 8 am, while his second division of larger ships attacked the forts, silencing them by 11 am. This was the first time that ships alone had defeated shore fortifications. English casualties were 25 killed and 40 wounded. The Bey still refused his demands, but Blake's attack helped the Venetians in their battle against the Muslim states two months later at the action of 21 June 1655. The Ottomans would improve Porto Farina's fortifications over the next decade.

== Aftermath ==
Though a tactical victory for Blake, the battle proved damaging to English strategic interests. The ships destroyed belonged not to the Tunisian corsairs, but to their nominal overlords the Ottoman Empire, whose goodwill was key to the English Levant Company's trade in the region.

== Order of battle ==
=== England (Robert Blake) ===
First Division
Newcastle 40
Kentish 40
Taunton 36
Foresight 36
Amity 30
Princess Mary 34
Pearl 22
Mermaid 22
Merlin 24
Second Division
George 60
Andrew 54
Plymouth 50
Worcester 46
Unicorn 54
Bridgewater 50
Success 24

=== Barbary states ===
9 ships hauled ashore (??) - Captured and burnt
