= English ship Triumph (1562) =

1562 galleon of the English fleet

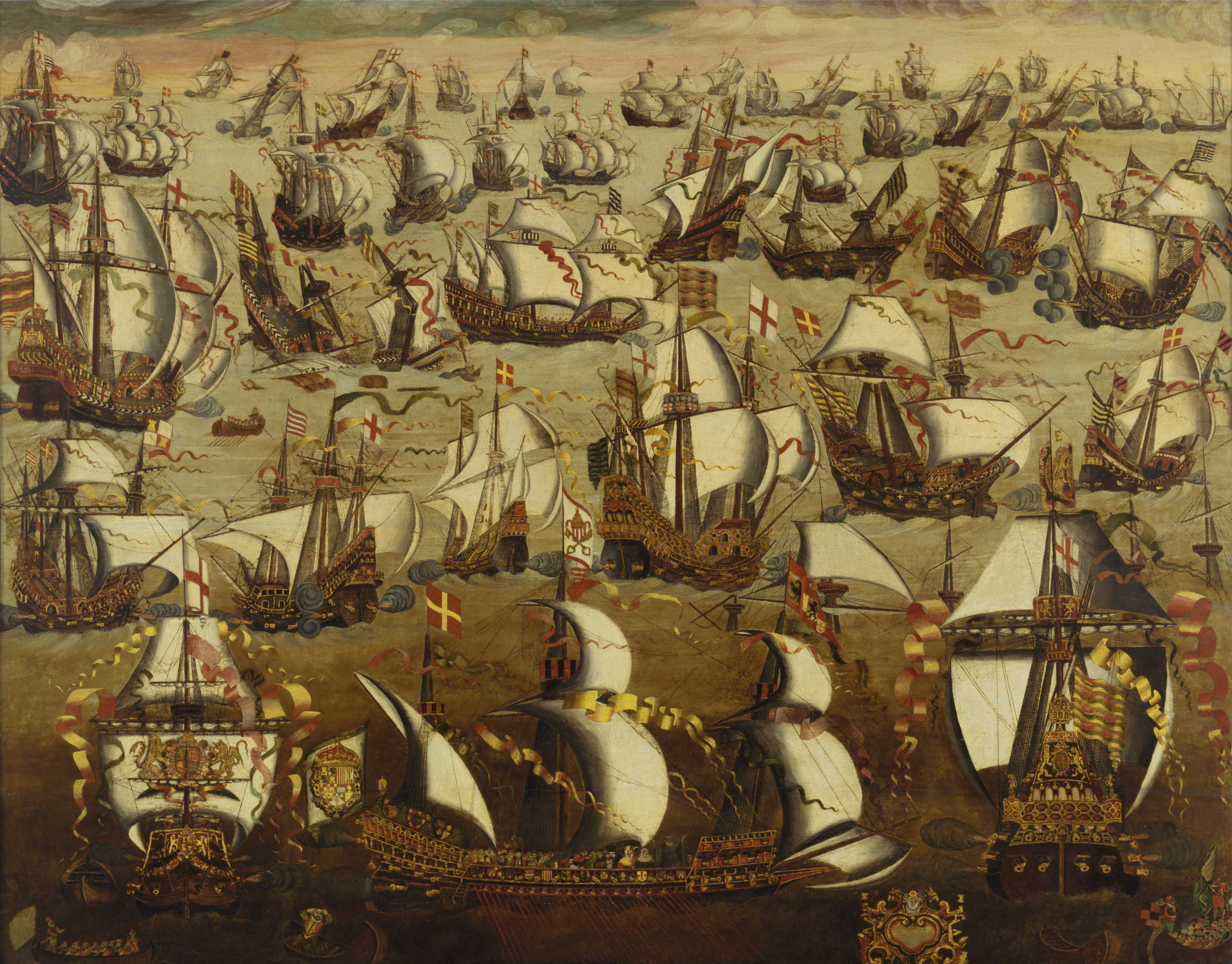
- English ships fight the Spanish Armada, 1588

History

England
- Name: Triumph
- Builder: Deptford Dockyard
- Laid down: 1561
- Launched: October 1562
- Fate: Rebuilt 1598–99. Condemned, 1618

General characteristics as newbuilt 1561-62
- Class & type: 42-gun great ship
- Tons burthen: 742 tons
- Length: Unrecorded
- Beam: Unrecorded
- Depth of hold: Unrecorded
- Sail plan: Full-rigged ship
- Complement: 500
- Armament: 42 guns - comprising 9 demi-cannon, 4 cannon periers, 14 culverins, 7 demi-culverins, 6 sakers and 2 minions. Also 26 smaller (4 port-pieces, 10 fowlers and 12 bases).

General characteristics as rebuilt 1598-99
- Class & type: 55-gun great ship
- Tons burthen: 760 tons
- Length: 100 ft (30 m) (keel)
- Beam: 40 ft (12 m)
- Depth of hold: 19 ft (5.8 m)
- Sail plan: Full-rigged ship
- Complement: 500
- Armament: 55 guns - comprising 3 demi-cannon, 4 cannon periers, 19 culverins, 16 demi-culverins and 13 sakers. Also 4 smaller (fowlers).

Triumph of 1562 was the first vessel of record to hold the name. She was a 60-gun English galleon built in Deptford in 1561–62 and launched in October 1562, and once the flagship of Admiral Robert Blake.

With a nominal burden of 1000 tons, she was the largest ship built in England during the reign of Queen Elizabeth I. Triumph was a square-rigged galleon of four masts, including two lateen-rigged mizzenmasts. She served effectively as the flagship of Vice-Admiral Martin Frobisher during the battle of the Spanish Armada in 1588. In 1595–96 she was rebuilt as a race-built galleon, but at the time of the Commission of Enquiry in 1618 she was condemned and broken up.
