= Andrew Ball (Royal Navy officer) =

Royal Navy officer (died 1653)

Andrew Ball (died 1653) was an English officer of the Royal and Commonwealth Navy.

== Life ==
The first official mention of his name is as captain of the Adventure in 1648, when Vice-Admiral William Batten carried part of the fleet over to Holland to join Charles Stuart, Prince of Wales. Ball was one of those who stayed with Sir George Ayscue, and who afterwards, on 25 September 1648, signed the refusal to desert.

During 1649 he was employed in the English Channel, cruising off the Lizard or Land's End for the safeguard of merchant ships against pirates and sea-rovers, and on 21 December was ordered specially to attend to Prince Rupert's movements. In November 1650, still in the Adventure, he was selected to accompany Captain Sir William Penn to the Mediterranean, and was on that voyage for nearly sixteen months, arriving in the Downs on 1 April 1652.

During the following summer he was engaged in fitting out the Antelope, a new ship only just launched, and in September was sent to Copenhagen in command of a squadron of eighteen ships. The King of Denmark, on some misunderstanding about the Sound dues, had laid an embargo on about twenty English merchant ships that were in Danish harbours, and it was hoped that the appearance of a respectable force would remove the difficulty. They sailed from Yarmouth on 9 September, and on the 20th anchored a few miles below Elsinore; there they remained, treating with the King of Denmark, but forbidden to use force, as the King of Denmark was probably aware. They were still hoping that the ships might be released, when, on 30 September, they were caught in the open roadstead in a violent storm; the cables parted, the Antelope was hurled on shore, the other ships, more or less damaged, were swept out to sea. It was not till 2 October that they could get back and take up the survivors from the wreck; after which they did not stay for further negotiations, but set sail for England, and arrived in Bridlington Bay on the 14th. They went on to Harwich and the Thames, to refit.

After the severe check which Robert Blake received at the Battle of Dungeness, on 30 November, Ball was appointed to the 50-gun Lion, in the room of Captain Saltonstall, whose conduct in the battle had been called into question. He was occupied during the next two months in refitting the Lion, and then joined the fleet off Queenborough at the beginning of February 1653, when Blake promoted him to the command of his own ship, the Triumph, (a position somewhat analogous to what was later known as captain of the fleet, which confers the temporary rank of rear-admiral). The fleet, having sailed to the westward, encountered the Dutch off Portland on 18 February 1653. The fight, the Battle of Portland, lasted throughout the day, and during the whole time the enemy's chief efforts were directed against the Triumph, which suffered heavily in hull of the ship, in rigging, and in men; her captain, Andrew Ball, being one of the killed.

In acknowledgement of Ball's services, the state assigned a gratuity of £1,000 to his widow. The Andrew Ball who commanded the Orange Tree in the Mediterranean, under Sir Thomas Allin, in 1668, and was then accidentally drowned, may have been a son.
