= John Barker (scholar) =

15th century British scholar and lecturer

John Barker (fl. ca. 1471–1482) was first recorded as a King's Scholar at Eton College about 1471. He went to King's College, Cambridge in 1474, was elected a fellow in 1477, and graduated MA in 1479. His Etonian connection may indicate that he was from the south of England.

Barker taught logic to "sophisters" (second-year undergraduates) using his own text, the Scutum inexpugnabile. No copy survives, but it was probably an introduction to Aristotelian logic and modal grammar. Brian Rowe, who came up to King's in 1499, wrote a commendatory preface for it in the early 16th century, indicating that it was then still in use in the college. Barker left King's in 1482, approximately the year John Fisher and John Colet came to Cambridge, and later he joined the Franciscans. The date and place of his death are unknown.
