= John Barker (parliamentary officer) =

Australian politician

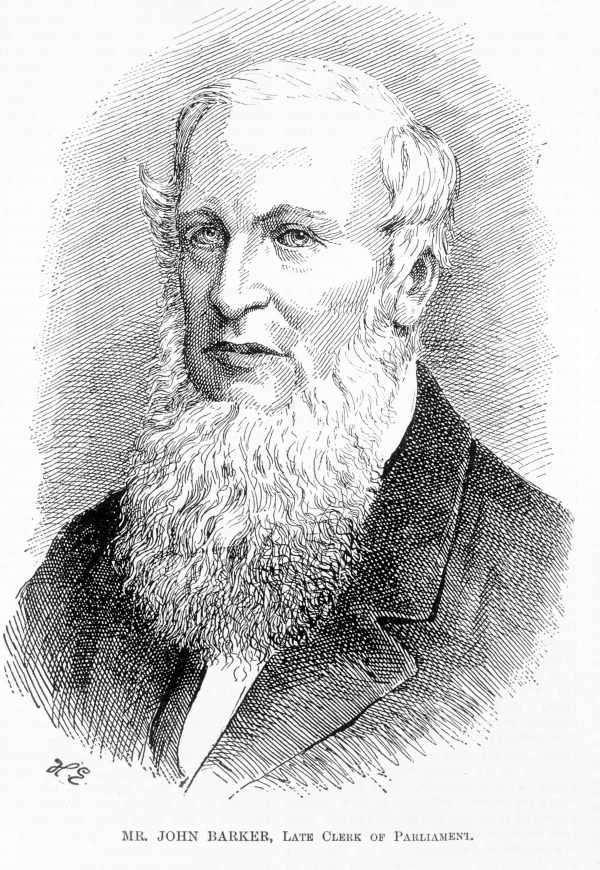
John Barker

John Barker (1814–15 November 1891), was an English-born Australian lawyer and parliamentary officer. He was the first parliamentary clerk of both the Legislative Council and Legislative Assembly in the Victorian colonial parliament.

Barker was the eldest son of the late John Barker and Mary Anne, and was born at Aylesbury, Buckinghamshire. He emigrated to Port Phillip (now Victoria) in 1840, after entering himself for the bar at Lincoln's Inn, and engaged in pastoral pursuits with his brother Edward, afterwards a well-known physician in Melbourne. Revisiting England, he was called to the bar in 1843; and in 1844 married Susanna, daughter of Richard Hodgkinson, of Morton Grange, Nottingham. He returned to Port Phillip in November 1844, accompanied by his brother William (who subsequently practised as a surgeon at Emerald Hill, Melbourne). In the next year he was appointed a magistrate, and in August 1849 was one of the Commissioners under the Disputed Boundaries Act, having the Hamilton district assigned to him.

Barker, who was admitted to the Victorian bar in November 1851, was in October of that year, on the separation of Port Phillip from New South Wales and its formation into the colony of Victoria, appointed Clerk of the Legislative Council then constituted, and successfully performed the difficult task of inaugurating its procedure. When responsible government came into operation in 1856, Barker was offered the choice of the clerkship of the new Upper or Lower Chamber. He accepted the latter, and remained Clerk of the Assembly until April 1882, when he was appointed Clerk of the Legislative Council and Clerk of Parliaments, a post which he resigned in 1891. He died on 15 November of that year. At his death he was the last surviving participant from either the first parliament or the formation of the Legislative Assembly.
