= John Barker (architect) =

Australian architect

- Born: 1940
- Died: 2010 (aged 69–70)
- Citizenship: Australian
- Education: Royal Melbourne Institute of Technology
- Occupation: Architect
- Practice: RAIA Housing Service, Victorian Chapter

John Barker (1940–2010) was an Australian architect, who served as the fifth Directing Architect for the Architects’ Housing Service (formerly Small Homes Service) Victorian Chapter.

== Biography ==
Barker obtained his Fellowship Diploma at the Royal Institute of Technology in 1967.

Barker then went on to operate an architectural practice in Carlton from 1969 to 1971, as well as working as a consultant for project home builders.

In 1971, Barker was appointed as Directing Architect for the RAIA (Victorian Chapter) Housing Service (Architects’ Housing Service).

Barker was the fifth director of the service, following on from other notable directors, such as Robin Boyd.

Barker was the first Director to act in a full time capacity, as there was expanding demand from the public for homebuilding advice.

During his time as Director, Barker wrote a weekly column in The Age newspaper, "The Age R.A.I.A House of the Week" where he commented on notable architect designed homes in Victoria.

Barker also established the Architects Renovator Service, which operated successfully through the Victorian Chapter of the RAIA.

In 1979, Barker stepped down from his position as Director to work in his own practice, his main interest being residential and renovation projects.

In 1980, Barker published the book "Renovate: architectural concepts for rejuvenating houses and building"

Circa 1990, Barker was the Victorian State Manager of Archicentre (now defunct), the building advisory service of the Royal Australian Institute of Architects.

== Selected works ==
- Architect's Housing Service Plan V451
- Model 1300
- Renovate : architectural concepts for rejuvenating houses and buildings
