= John Barker (Master of Christ's College, Cambridge) =

John Barker, D.D. (b Seghill 1 June 1728 - d Cambridge 1832) was a priest and academic in the late eighteenth and early nineteenth centuries.

Barker was educated at Christ's College, Cambridge, graduating B.A. in 1749 and MA in 1752. He became Fellow in 1749; and was Master from 1780 until his death. He held livings at Bourn, Caldecot and Waddingham.
