= English ship Merlin (1652) =

Historical English marine vessel

History

Commonwealth of England
- Name: Merlin
- Ordered: December 1651
- Builder: Chatham Dockyard
- Launched: 1652
- Commissioned: 1652
- Renamed: HMS Merlin May 1660
- Honours and awards: Portland 1653; Gabbard 1653; Scheveningen 1653; Porto Farina 1655

Kingdom of England
- Name: HMS Merlin
- Acquired: May 1660
- Commissioned: September 1660
- Fate: Taken by Dutch 13 October 1665

General characteristics as built
- Class & type: 14-gun sixth rate
- Tons burthen: 12924/94 tons (bm)
- Length: 75 ft 0 in (22.86 m) keel for tonnage
- Beam: 18 ft 8 in (5.69 m)
- Draught: 9 ft 0 in (2.74 m)
- Depth of hold: 7 ft 8 in (2.34 m)
- Propulsion: Sails
- Sail plan: Full-rigged ship
- Complement: 60 in 1660; 80/60/35 in 1662
- Armament: as built 14/12 guns

The English ship Merlin was a 14-gun sixth rate vessel built under the 1651 Programme at Chatham Dockyard for the Commonwealth of England in 1651/52. She sailed with Robert Blakes Fleet during her career in the Commonwealth Navy. She partook in the Battles of Portland, the Gabbard, Scheveningen and Porto Fina. She was incorporated into the Royal Navy as HMS Merlin in May 1660. She continued her duties in trade protection and convoy escort. She was taken by the Dutch off Cadiz, Spain defending her convoy in October 1665.

She was the second vessel to bear the name Merlin since it was used for a 10-gun pinnace, built in 1579 and listed until 1601.

She was awarded the Battle Honours Portland 1653, Gabbard 1653, Sheveningen 1653 and Porto Farina.

== Construction and specifications ==
On 5 December 1651, the Admiralty ordered that three small vessels be built. She was to be built at Chatham Dockyard under the guidance of Master Shipwright Captain John Taylor. She was launched in 1652. Her dimensions were a keel of 75 feet 0 inches (22.86 metres) for tonnage calculation with a breadth of 18 feet 0 inches (5.49 metres) and a depth of hold of 7 feet 8 inches (2.34 metres). Her builder's measure tonnage was calculated as 12924/94 tons (burthen). Her draught was 9 feet 0 inches (2.74 metres).

The initial manning of the ship was a crew of 90 personnel by the end of 1653. In 1662 the establishment for her crew was stated as 80/60/35 personnel dependent on wartime or peacetime and the number of guns carried. Her initial gun armament was established as 14 guns in 1653. By 1660 her armament was 14 guns wartime and 12 guns for peacetime.

== Commissioned service ==
Merlin was commissioned prior to her launch in 1652 under the command of Captain Peter Warren to oversee her completion and final fitting. Later in 1652 Captain Warren was replaced by Captain William Vessey. She sailed with Robert Blake's Fleet at the Battle of Portland on 18 February 1653. After the engagement, Captain George Crapnell took command. She participated in the Battle of the Gabbard Sand between 2 and 3 June 1653 as a member of White Squadron, Centre Division. This fight was followed by the Battle of Scheveningen on 31 July 1653as a member of White Squadron, Centre Division. In 1655 she was under the command of Captain Peter Foot sailing with Robert Blake in the Mediterranean. She was at Tunis on 4 April 1655 for the Battle of Porto Farina. Captain George Ford was in command between 1656 and 1658 sailing with Robert Blake.

On 7 May 1660 she was commissioned as HMS Merlin under the command of Captain Edward Grove holding command until 8 December 1662. With HRH King Charles II renaming the English Navy as the Royal Navy on the Restoration of the Monarchy in May 1660, all English ships were given the right to bear the letters 'HMS' or 'His Majesty's Ship' before their name. Captain Charles Haward took command on 23 March 1665.

== Loss ==
She was taken by the Dutch off Cadiz, Spain while defending her convoy en route to Tangier, Morocco on 13 October 1665.
