= English ship Martin (1652) =

History

Commonwealth of England
- Name: Martin
- Ordered: December 1651
- Builder: Portsmouth Dockyard
- Launched: 1652
- Commissioned: 1652
- Renamed: HMS Martin May 1660
- Honours and awards: Dover 1652; Portland 1653; Gabbard 1653

Kingdom of England
- Name: HMS Martin
- Acquired: May 1660
- Commissioned: September 1660
- Honours and awards: Lowestoft 1665
- Fate: Sold in February 1667

General characteristics as built
- Class & type: 14-gun sixth rate
- Tons burthen: 12723/94 tons (bm)
- Length: 64 ft 0 in (19.51 m) keel for tonnage
- Beam: 19 ft 4 in (5.89 m)
- Draught: 8 ft 0 in (2.44 m)
- Depth of hold: 7 ft 6 in (2.29 m)
- Propulsion: Sails
- Sail plan: Full-rigged ship
- Complement: 50 in 1660; 60/50/35 in 1666
- Armament: as built 14/12 guns; 14 guns in 1666; 6 × demi-culverins; 4 × sakers; 2 × minions; 2 × falcons

The English ship Martin was a 14-gun sixth rate vessel built under the 1651 Programme at Portsmouth Dockyard for the Commonwealth of England in 1651/52. Her service in the Commonwealth Navy was very active. She participated in the Battles of Dover, Portland and the Gabbard. She was with Robert Blake at Porto Farina. She was the main vessel at the Capture of Jamaica in 1655. With the Restoration she became HMS Martin. During the Second Anglo-Dutch War she was in the initial battle of Lowestoft then the Battle of Vagen. She was sold in February 1667.

She was the second ship to bear this name since it was used for a vessel captured in 1651 and sold in 1653.

She was awarded the Battle Honours Dover 1652, Portland 1653, Gabbard 1653, and Lowestoft 1665

== Construction and specifications ==
On 5 December 1651, the Admiralty ordered that three small vessels be built. She was to be built at Deptford Dockyard under the guidance of Master Shipwright Phineas Pett. She was launched in 1652. Her dimensions were a keel of 85 feet 0 inches (25.91 metres) for tonnage calculation with a breadth of 18 feet 0 inches (5.49 metres) and a depth of hold of 7 feet 6 inches (2.29 metres). Her builder's measure tonnage was calculated as 14646/94 tons (burthen). Her draught was 9 feet 0 inches (2.74 metres).

The initial manning of the ship was a crew of 90 personnel by the end of 1653. In 1660 the crew had dropped to 60 personnel and in 1666 had risen to 70 personnel. In 1677 the establishment for her crew was stated as 75/65/45 personnel dependent on wartime or peacetime and the number of guns carried. Her initial gun armament was established as 14 guns in 1653. By 1660 her armament was 14 guns wartime and 12 guns for peacetime. In 1666 Establishment her armament was 12 guns. Her actual armament in 1666 was 14 guns: six demi-culverins, (Note: The demi-culverin was a 9-pounder gun) four sakers, (Note: most guns between the 8-pdr and 5 1/4-pdr were known as sakers) two minions (Note: The minion was a 4-pdr gun) and two falcons. (Note: These were obsolete guns carried as anti-personnel weapons)

== Commissioned service ==
Martin was commissioned in 1652 under the command of Captain Robert Clarke, Jr. She participated in the Battle of Dover with Robert Blake on 19 May 1652. In 1653 she was under Captain John Vessey. She participated in the Battle off Portland on 18 February 1653. She followed this action with the Battle of the Gabbard Sand between 2 and 3 June 1653 as a member of Red Squadron, Centre Division. She was in action off the Vlie on 17 June 1652 where Captain John Vessey was killed. Captain William Vessey took command after the action in 1653. She spent the winter of 1653/54 in the Downs at the mouth of the River Thames. She was assigned to William Penn's Fleet for an expedition to the West Indies. The Fleet of 38 ships, four small ships and three thousand troops sailed on Christmas Day arriving at Barbados on 29 January. Their objective was to attack and capture Hispaniola (present day Santo Dominica). After the failure of General Robert Venables, the land force commander, Admiral Penn left and sailed on to Jamaica. He took command of the attack, transferring his Flag to Martin to assail the town of Port Royal. Between the 10th and the 17th, the Navy captured all of Jamaica without the General taking any part in the operation. When Admiral Penn sailed for Home, Martin was one of the sixteen vessels left behind. In 1654 Captain John Blythe was her commander sailing with Vice-Admiral William Goodson's Squadron in the West Indies in 1656. The remaining ships returned Home on 18 April 1657. In 1659 she was under Captain William Burrough into 1660.

After the Restoration of the Monarchy she was under the command of Captain William Poole as HMS Martin. With HRH King Charles II renaming the English Navy as the Royal Navy on the Restoration of the Monarchy, all English ships were given the right to bear the letters 'HMS' or 'His Majesty's Ship' before their name. In 1661 she was under Captain Bennett sailing with the Earl of Sandwich's Squadron at Tangier, Morocco. On 4 April 1664 she was commissioned under the command of Captain Edward Grove, followed by Captain William Tickle on 3 December 1664 until his death on 25 June 1665. Captain Richard White took command on 27 May 1665. She participated in the Battle of Lowestoft as a member of Red Squadron, Van Division on 3 June 1665. On 16 June 1665 she was under the command of William Kempthorne. She participated in the Battle of Vagen at Bergen, Norway on 2 August 1665. During the fight she lost one crew member killed with one wounded.

== Disposition ==
She was sold as useless in February 1667.
