= English ship Laurel (1651) =

History

England
- Name: Laurel
- Ordered: 5 February 1651
- Builder: Portsmouth Dockyard
- Launched: 1651
- Commissioned: 1651
- Honours and awards: Kentish Knock 1652; Dungeness 1652; Portland 1653; The Gabbard 1653; Scheveningen 1653
- Fate: Wrecked 30 May 1657

General characteristics
- Class & type: 46-gun Fourth-rate
- Tons burthen: 489 0/94 tons bm
- Length: 103 ft 0 in (31.4 m) Keel for tonnage
- Beam: 30 ft 1 in (9.2 m) maximum; 29 ft 10.5 in (9.1 m) for tonnage
- Depth of hold: 15 ft 0 in (4.6 m)
- Sail plan: ship-rigged
- Complement: 180 in 1652; 200 by 1653
- Armament: 46 as built; 48 to 50 guns 1653

Laurel was a 48-gun fourth-rate of the navy of the Commonwealth of England. She participated in almost all major Fleet Actions of the First Anglo-Dutch War. She was an active participant in the battles of Kentish Knock, Dungeness, Portland, The Gabbard and Scheveningen. She went to the west Indies with Admiral William Penn. She was wrecked in May 1657.

Laurel was the first named vessel in the English and Royal Navy.

== Construction and specifications ==
She was ordered by Parliament on 5 February 1651 to be built at Portsmouth Dockyard under the guidance of Master Shipwright John Tippetts. Her dimensions were 103 feet 0 inches (31.4 metres) keel for tonnage with a breadth of 30 feet 1 inch (9.2 metres) at maximum with 29 feet 10.5 inches (9.1 metres) for tonnage calculation and a depth of hold of 15 feet 0 inches (4.6 metres). Her builder's measure tonnage was 489 tons.

Her gun armament in 1651 was 46 guns. By 1653 her guns were increased to either 48 or 50 guns. Her guns would consist of culverins, (Note: The culverin was a gun of 4,500 pounds with a 5.5-inch bore firing a 17.5-pound shot with a twelve-pound powder charge) on the lower deck with demi-culverines, (Note: The demi-culverin was a gun of 3,400 pounds with a four-inch bore firing a 9.5-pound shot with an eight-pound powder charge) on the upper deck and sakers. (Note: The sacar or saker was a gun of 1,400 pounds with a 3.5-inch bore firing a 5.5-pound shot with a 5.5-pound powder charge) on the quarterdeck. Her manning was 180 personnel and rose to 200 personnel in 1653.

== Commissioned service ==
=== Service in Commonwealth Navy ===
She was commissioned in 1651 under the command of Captain John Taylor. She was at the Battle of Kentish Knock on 28 September 1652. Following this engagement she was at the Battle of Dungeness on 29 November 1652. Shortly afterwards Captain Taylor was dismissed and replace by Captain John Wadsworth. In early 1653 she came under the command of Captain Samuel Howett. She was at the Battle of Portland on 18 February 1653 as the Flagship of Rear-Admiral Howett in Red Squadron. After the battle Captain John Stoakes took command. She remained in Red Squadron, Van Division for the Battle of the Gabbard on 2–3 June 1653. On 31 July she participated in the Battle of Scheveningen near Texel. In the fall of 1653 Captain Richard Newberry took command and spent the winter of 1653/54 at Chatham.

With the end of the war she came under Captain William Crispin in 1655 and sailed with Admiral William Penn's Fleet to the West Indies. In the second half of 1655 she came under the command of Captain William Kirby.

== Loss ==
She was wrecked off Greater Yarmouth on 30 May 1657.
