= John Barker (medical writer) =

John Barker, M.D. (1708–1748) was an English medical writer.

== Life ==
Barker was educated at St. Thomas's Hospital, London, and Wadham College, Oxford, where he graduated B.A. in 1731, M.A. and B.M. in 1737, and D.M. in 1743. He practised medicine in Salisbury for nearly ten years. In 1746, he was admitted a member of the College of Physicians, and, moving to London, became in that year physician to the Westminster Hospital. In the following year he resigned this post on being appointed physician to his majesty's army in the Low Countries. He did not long survive his promotion, and was buried in St. Stephen's Church, Ipswich, where there is a tablet to his memory.

== Works ==
While at Salisbury he published in 1742 ‘An Inquiry into the Nature, Cause, and Cure of the Epidemic Fever of that and the two preceding years.’ In this treatise he objected to bleeding as a part of the treatment, and was consequently attacked by another Salisbury physician, a Mr. Hele, in a local newspaper. Barker replied in a pamphlet entitled ‘A Defence of a late Treatise &c.,’ 1743. He also published in 1748 in an octavo volume ‘An Essay on the Agreement between Ancient and Modern Physicians, or a Comparison between the Practice of Hippocrates, Galen, Sydenham, and Boerhaave.’
