= Battle of Dover =

The Battle of Dover may refer to:

- Battle of Sandwich (1217), also known as Battle of Dover, 24 August 1217, a naval engagement between England and France in the First Barons' War
- Battle of Dover (1652), 29 May 1652, in the First Anglo-Dutch War
- Battle of Dover (1863), 3 February 1863, a land battle of the American Civil War

== See also ==
- Battle of the Dover Strait; three actions in this location
