= English ship Drake (1652) =

History

Commonwealth of England
- Name: Drake
- Ordered: December 1651
- Builder: Deptford Dockyard
- Launched: 1652
- Commissioned: 1651
- Renamed: HMS Drake May 1660

Kingdom of England
- Name: HMS Drake
- Acquired: May 1660
- Commissioned: September 1660
- Honours and awards: Lowestoft 1665
- Fate: Sold at Jamaica 1691

General characteristics as built
- Class & type: 14-gun sixth rate
- Tons burthen: 14646/94 tons (bm)
- Length: 85 ft 0 in (25.91 m) keel for tonnage
- Beam: 18 ft 8 in (5.69 m)
- Draught: 9 ft 0 in (2.74 m)
- Depth of hold: 7 ft 6 in (2.29 m)
- Propulsion: Sails
- Sail plan: Full-rigged ship
- Complement: 60 in 1660; 70 in 1666; 75/65/45 in 1677
- Armament: as built 14/12 guns; 10 guns in 1666; 4 × demi-cannon; 2 × 8-pdr sakers; 4 × minions; 16/14 sakers in 1677

The English ship Drake was a 14-gun sixth rate vessel built under the 1651 Programme at Deptford Dockyard for the Commonwealth of England in 1651/52. During her time in the Commonwealth Navy she spent her time patrolling Home Waters and did not participate actively in the First Anglo-Dutch War. On the restoration she was incorporated into the Royal Navy as HMS Drake. During the Second Anglo-Dutch War she fought in the Battle of Lowestoft. She spent the rest of her career patrolling Home Waters before going to Jamaica. She was sold in Jamaica in 1691.

She was the first vessel to bear the name Drake in the English Royal Navy.

She was awarded the Battle Honour Lowestoft 1665.

== Construction and specifications ==
On 5 December 1651, the Admiralty ordered that three small vessels be built. She was to be built at Deptford Dockyard under the guidance of Master Shipwright Phineas Pett. She was launched in 1652. Her dimensions were a keel of 85 feet 0 inches (25.91 metres) for tonnage calculation with a breadth of 18 feet 0 inches (5.49 metres) and a depth of hold of 7 feet 6 inches (2.29 metres). Her builder's measure tonnage was calculated as 14646/94 tons (burthen). Her draught was 9 feet 0 inches (2.74 metres).

The initial manning of the ship was a crew of 90 personnel by the end of 1653. In 1660 the crew had dropped to 60 personnel and in 1666 had risen to 70 personnel. In 1677 the establishment for her crew was stated as 75/65/45 personnel dependent on wartime or peacetime and the number of guns carried. Her initial gun armament was established as 14 guns in 1653. By 1660 her armament was 14 guns wartime and 12 guns for peacetime. In 1666 Establishment her armament was 12 guns. Her actual armament in 1666 was 10 guns: four demi-cannons, (Note: The demi-cannon was a 42-pounder gun) two 8-pounder sakers, (Note: most guns between the 8-pdr and 5 1/4 pdr were known as sakers) and four minions. (Note: The minion was a 4-pdr gun) The 1677 Establishment listed her armament as 16 wartime and 14 guns peacetime. These guns were all sakers.

== Commissioned service ==
Drake was commissioned prior to her launch (1652) in 1651 under the command of Captain Anthony Smith to oversee her completion and final fitting. In 1653 she was assigned Captain Robert Clarke, Senior. Later during 1653 Captain Abraham Allgate took command until 1656 when he was replaced with Captain John Bowery, who held command until 1660. With HRH King Charles II renaming the English Navy as the Royal Navy on the Restoration of the Monarchy, all English ships were given the right to bear the letters 'HMS' or 'His Majesty's Ship' before their name.

On 5 September 1660 HMS Drake was commissioned under the command of Captain William Battin, who held command until 6 May 1661. On 23 May 1661 she came under Captain Arthur Laughorne who held command until she was placed in Ordinary on 28 November 1661. She was commissioned on 9 April 1664 under the command of Captain Tobias Sackler until 1 March 1665. On 2 March 1665 Captain Richard Poole took command. She fought at the Battle of Lowestoft as a member of Red Squadron, Centre Division on 3 June 1665. Captain Thomas Hammond (or possibly Harwood) took command on 2 May 1666 until 21 December 1667. She remained idle until 6 April 1668 when Captain Leonard Guy took command until his death on 21 April 1668. Captain Richard Country took command the day after Captain Guy died. He held command until she was paid off into Ordinary on 8 December 1668.

On 1 January 1672 she was commissioned with Captain John Temple as commander. He was followed by Captain Casibelan Burton on 17 June 1672, then followed by Captain Rowland Stepney on 25 August 1672. She patrolled the North Sea in 1673. 1674 she sailed to Tangier. Captain Stepney died on 26 December 1676. Captain John Tyrell was in command from 9 February 1678 until 19 July 1679 patrolling in Home Waters. On 10 July 1683 she was under Captain Thomas Leighton for patrolling in Home Waters until 24 February 1684.On 25 February Captain Baron Wylde took command still on duty in Home Waters until 6 October 1684. Captain Thomas Spragge took command on 11 April for service at Jamaica. Captain Spragge held command into 1690.

== Disposition ==
In 1690 she was condemned at Jamaica. She was sold at Jamaica in 1691.
