= English ship Antelope (1652) =

56-gun great frigate of the navy of the Commonwealth of England

History

England
- Name: Antelope
- Ordered: 8 August 1651
- Builder: Woolwich Dockyard
- Launched: Spring 1652
- Fate: Wrecked, 30 September 1652

General characteristics
- Class & type: 56-gun second rate great frigate
- Tons burthen: 828 tons
- Length: 120 ft (36.6 m) (keel)
- Beam: 36 ft (11.0 m)
- Depth of hold: 16 ft (4.9 m)
- Propulsion: Sails
- Sail plan: Full-rigged ship
- Complement: 250 (or possibly more)
- Armament: 56 guns of various weights of shot

The Antelope was a 56-gun great frigate of the navy of the Commonwealth of England, launched at Woolwich Dockyard in 1652. Notwithstanding the term "frigate", this was the largest of the warships ordered by the Commonwealth, and was eventually classed as a second rate.

The Antelope was fitted out in July 1652, and sailed from Woolwich in August. She was commissioned under Captain Andrew Ball, and deployed to the Danish coast to convoy merchantmen from the Sound. She sailed for home on 27 September but was wrecked off Jutland at around 3 o'clock in the morning of 30 September 1652, in bad weather. Most of her crew were saved.
