= Robert Blake (admiral) =

English naval officer (1598–1657)

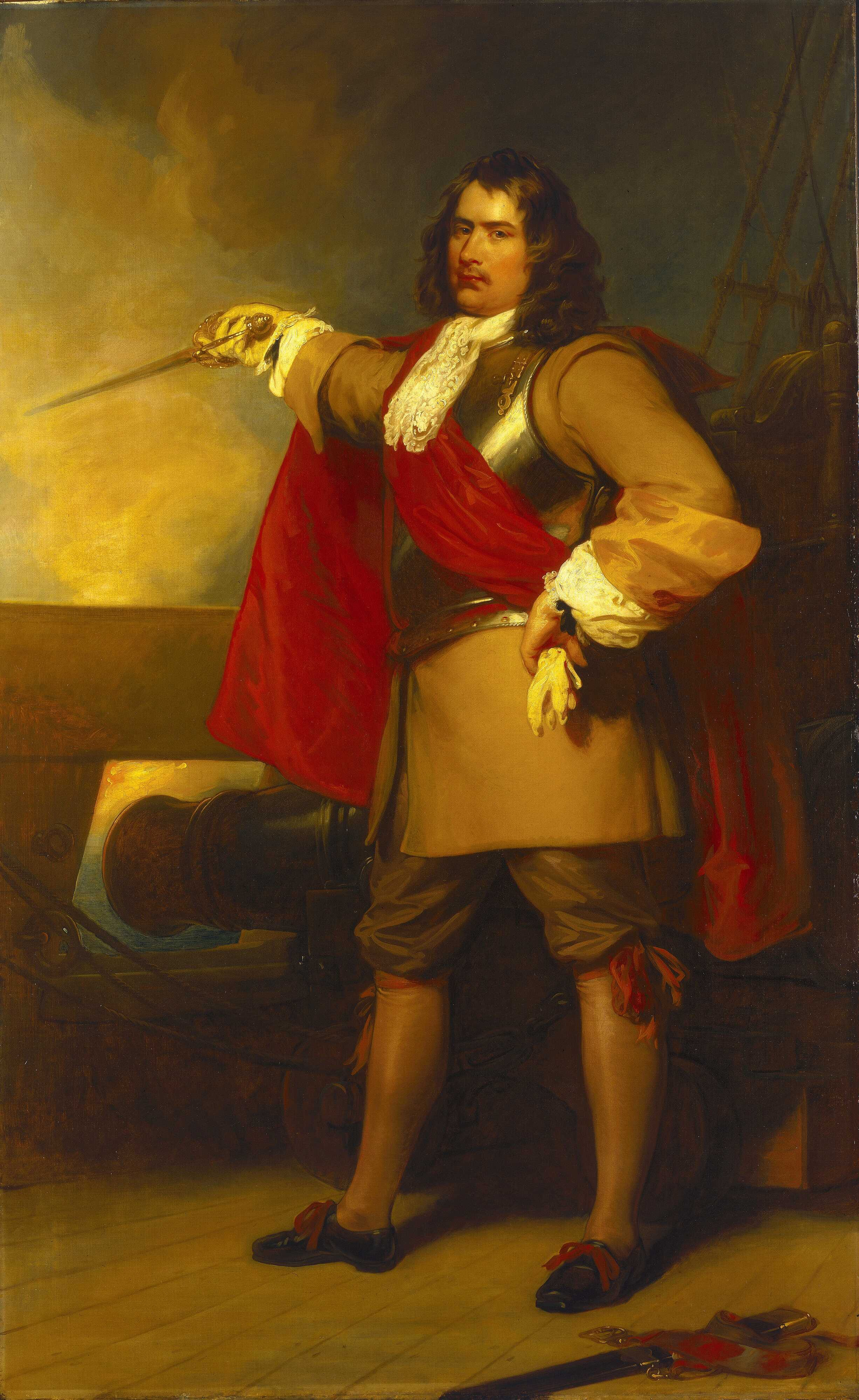
- Portrait by Henry Perronet Briggs, 1829

General at Sea, 1649–1657 Lord Warden of the Cinque Ports, 1656 to 1657
- In office 1656–1657
- Preceded by: Thomas Kelsey
- Succeeded by: Lord Winchilsea

Personal details
- Born: September 27, 1598 Bridgwater, England
- Died: August 7, 1657 (aged 58) Off Plymouth, English Channel
- Resting place: Westminster Abbey (initially); St Margaret's (now)
- Relations: Vice Admiral Benjamin Blake (Brother), Joseph Blake (nephew)
- Nickname: "Father of the Royal Navy"

Military service
- Allegiance: Commonwealth of England; The Protectorate
- Branch/service: Royal Navy
- Years of service: 1649–1657
- Rank: General at sea
- Commands: Mediterranean Fleet
- Conflicts: See list: English Civil War; Siege of Lyme Regis; Sieges of Taunton; First Anglo-Dutch War; Battle of Dover; Battle of the Kentish Knock; Battle of Dungeness; Battle of Portland; Battle of the Gabbard; Action of 14 April 1655; Anglo-Spanish War; Battle of Santa Cruz de Tenerife

General at Sea Robert Blake (27 September 1598 – 7 August 1657) was an English naval officer who served as general at sea and the Lord Warden of the Cinque Ports from 1656 to 1657. Blake served under Oliver Cromwell during the English Civil War and Anglo-Spanish War, and as the commanding Admiral of the State's Navy during the First Anglo-Dutch War. Blake is recognised as the "chief founder of England's naval supremacy", a dominance subsequently inherited by the British Royal Navy well into the early 20th century.

Despite this, due to deliberate attempts to expunge the Parliamentarians from historical records following the Stuart Restoration, Blake's achievements tend to remain relatively unrecognised. Blake's successes, however, are considered to have "never been excelled, not even by Nelson" according to one biographer, while Blake is often compared with Nelson by others.

== Early life ==
Robert Blake was the first son of thirteen children born to Humphrey Blake and Sarah Williams. He was baptised at the Church of Saint Mary the Virgin in Somerset on 27 September 1598. He attended Bridgwater Grammar School for Boys, then went to Wadham College, Oxford. He had hoped to follow an academic career, but failed to secure a fellowship to Merton College, probably in consideration of his political and religious views, but also because the warden of Merton, Sir Henry Savile, had "an eccentric distaste for men of low stature". Blake, at five feet six inches (168 cm) tall, thus failed to meet Savile's 'standard of manly beauty'.

When Blake's father died in 1625 he inherited the family estate of Knoll Hill. Here, taking on the responsibilities of the eldest son, he committed much of his time in the duty of educating his many brothers and sisters, and preparing them for adulthood. Blake biographer and historian David Hannay (1853–1934) maintains that was a likely reason why Blake never married, while pointing out also that other biographers offer differing reasons. English historian Edward Hyde, (Note: Edward Hyde, 1st Earl of Clarendon was "an English statesman, lawyer, diplomat and historian who served as chief advisor to Charles I during the First English Civil War, and Lord Chancellor to Charles II from 1660 to 1667.") who lived in Blake's day writes of Blake, "... he was well enough versed in books for a man who intended not to be of any profession, having sufficient of his own to maintain him in the plenty he affected, and having then no appearance of ambition to be a greater man than he was."

The Blake family had a seat for several generations at (and were Lords of the Manor of) Tuxwell, in the parish of Bishops Lydeard, near Bridgwater, Somerset. The earliest member of the family located in records was Humphrey Blake, who lived in the reign of Henry VIII. Robert Blake's grandfather, also named Robert, was the first of the family to strike out on his own from country life as a merchant, hoping to become rich from Spanish trade. He served as chief magistrate and member of Parliament for Bridgwater several times, in recognition of the esteem in which the townspeople held him. His son, Humphrey, succeeded him in business, and in addition to his father's estates at Puriton (of which he held the lordship), Catcot, Bawdrip and Woolavington, came into the estate at Plainsfield held by the family of his wife, Sarah Williams, since the reign of Henry VII.

After his departure from university in 1625, it is believed that Blake was engaged in trade, and a Dutch writer subsequently claimed that he had lived for 'five or six years' in Schiedam. Having returned to Bridgwater, probably because of the death of his mother in 1638, he decided to stand for election to Parliament.

== Political background ==
Blake family Coat of Arms

In April, 1640, Blake was elected as the Member of Parliament for Bridgwater in the Short Parliament, as one of two Burgesses for Bridgwater. When the English Civil War broke out during the period of the Long Parliament, and having failed to be re-elected in November, Blake began his military career on the side of the parliamentarians despite having no substantial experience of military or naval matters.

Blake returned to Parliament as member for Taunton in 1645, when the Royalist Colonel Windham was expelled. He would later return to recover from an injury sustained in the Battle of Portland. During that time he represented Bridgwater in the Barebone's Parliament of 1653 and First Protectorate Parliament of 1654 and Taunton in the Second Protectorate Parliament of 1656 before returning to sea.

== Naval service ==
Blake is often referred to as the 'Father of the Royal Navy'. As well as being largely responsible for building the largest navy the country had ever known, from a few tens of ships to well over a hundred, he was also the first to keep a fleet at sea over the winter. Blake also produced the navy's first ever set of rules and regulations, The Laws of War and Ordinances of the Sea, the first version of which, containing 20 provisions, was passed by the House of Commons on 5 March 1649, listing 39 offences and their punishments—mostly death. The Instructions of the Admirals and Generals of the Fleet for Councils of War, issued in 1653 by Blake, George Monck, John Disbrowe and William Penn, also instituted the first naval courts-martial in the English navy.

Blake developed new techniques to conduct blockades and landings; his Sailing Instructions and Fighting Instructions, which were major overhauls of naval tactics written while recovering from injury in 1653, were the foundation of English naval tactics in the Age of Sail. Blake's Fighting Instructions, issued by the generals at sea on 29 March 1653, are the first-known instructions to be written in any language to adopt the use of the single line ahead battle formation. Blake was also the first to successfully attack despite fire from shore forts.

=== English Civil War ===
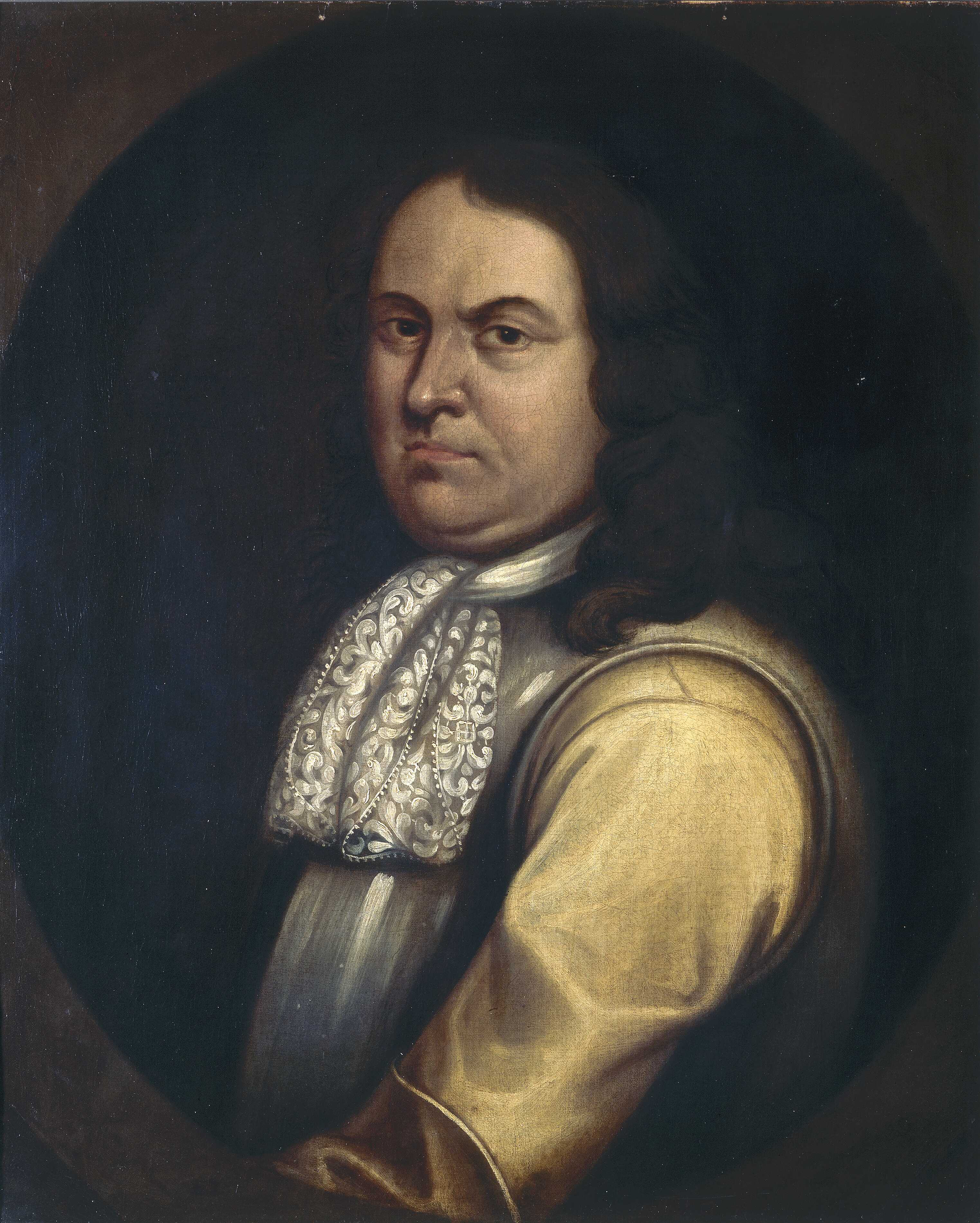
Robert Blake General at Sea, (1598–1657)

Before Blake embarked on a naval career he joined the New Model Army as a captain in Alexander Popham's regiment, Blake distinguished himself at the Siege of Bristol (July 1643) and was promoted to lieutenant colonel. After his leading role in holding Lyme Regis in the Siege of Lyme Regis (April 1644) he was promoted to colonel. He went on to hold the Parliamentary enclave of Taunton during the Siege of Taunton in 1645. Taunton was of great strategic importance as it was situated where all the main roads converged, commanding all lines of communication, which at the time Blake alone understood. After he took it by surprise, the siege earned him national recognition; it was where he famously declared that he would eat three of his four pairs of boots before he would surrender. He subsequently succeeded in winning the Siege of Dunster (November 1645).

In March 1649 the newly established Commonwealth government appointed Popham, Blake and Deane as Generals at Sea, (Note: Although it is commonly used, Blake's name was never prefixed by 'admiral', a rank which was not used in the Parliamentarian navy; his actual rank of general at sea combined the role of an admiral and commissioner of the Navy.) in that respective order of command, even though Blake had little experience at sea up until that time. With Deane committed in Scotland, Blake's first naval commission was in 1649, as second in command of the Dutch Navy against a domestic enemy with the objective of crushing the weary remnants of the Royalist party. King Charles I's followers were completely conquered and expelled from the mainland in England, but they still continued to fight on the sea and were taking many prizes, causing outcries from many of the merchants. Parliament was thus compelled to establish a naval administration, which appointed Blake, Popham and Deane as commanders of a fleet they were putting together and outfitting. Some three weeks before the execution of Charles I, on 11 January 1649, Prince Rupert of the Rhine led eight undermanned ships to Kinsale where the King's flag was still flying, in Ireland, in an attempt to prevent the Parliamentarians taking Ireland from the Royalists. Blake blockaded Rupert's fleet in Kinsale from 22 May, allowing Oliver Cromwell, who placed great confidence in Blake, to land at Dublin on 15 August. Blake was driven off by a storm in October and Rupert escaped via Spain to Lisbon. When it was learned that Rupert had fled to Lisbon, all cautionary protocols were suspended for the navy. Blake was recalled to Plymouth to supervise the fitting out of a fleet that was expanded to thirteen ships. With his refurbished and well supplied fleet, Blake put to sea in February 1650 and dropped anchor off Lisbon in an attempt to persuade the Portuguese king to expel Rupert. After two months the king decided to back Rupert. Blake was joined by another eight warships commanded by Edward Popham, who brought authority to go to war with Portugal. Blake now bore the risk and responsibility of a prolonged blockade, where now neither food nor water were accessible from the shore, making it necessary to periodically dispatch ships to Vigo or Cádiz for supplies, to which Richard Badiley was given the charge.

Rupert twice failed to break the blockade, which was finally raised after Blake sailed for Cádiz with seven ships he had captured after a three-hour engagement with 23 ships of the Portuguese fleet (during which the Portuguese vice-admiral was also sunk.) Blake re-engaged with Rupert, now with six ships, on 3 November near Málaga, capturing one ship. Two days later Rupert's other ships in the area were driven ashore attempting to escape from Cartagena, securing Parliamentarian supremacy at sea, and the recognition of the Parliamentary government by many European states. Parliament voted Blake 1,000 pounds by way of thanks in February 1651. In June of the same year Blake captured the Isles of Scilly, the last outpost of the Royalist navy, for which he again received Parliament's thanks. Soon afterwards he was made a member of the Council of State.

In 1651 Blake received orders to remove the Royalist Sir John Granville from the Isles of Scilly, where he had been appointed Governor by Charles II after a local rebellion. Granville had around 1,000 men under his command. The majority of Royalists forces were holding the main island of St Mary's, also defended by the guns of Star Castle and several frigates anchored, including the most powerful of the Royalist warships, making a direct assault very dangerous. Blake subsequently decided to secure Tresco and Bryher first, which would give the Commonwealth force a safe anchorage at New Grimsby harbour. After a failed attempt due to unfavourable winds, and other delays Blake finally prevailed and demanded Granville's surrender and ultimately secured the isles, also capturing many commanders and supplies

=== First Anglo-Dutch War ===
Blake's next adventures were during the First Anglo-Dutch War (1652–1654). The war started prematurely with a skirmish between the Dutch fleet of Maarten Tromp and Blake on 29 May 1652, at the Battle of Dover.

On 19 May 1652, Tromp was patrolling in the English Channel with a fleet of forty ships between Nieuport and the mouth of the Meuse River, to provide protection Dutch merchant ships, while monitoring the activity of the English fleet who had been seizing Dutch merchant ships. Blake was lying in Dover Roads with fifteen ships, with eight others in reserve of the coast of Lincolnshire in The Downs. When Tromp failed to lower his flag in salute, Blake, aboard his flagship the James, believing Tromp had just received orders from a Dutch dispatch ketch to commence battle, fired two warning shots, without ball. Subsequently, the Battle of Dover began when Tromp refused to strike his flag, but instead hoisted a red battle flag in defiance. This caused Blake to fire a third gun, damaging Tromp's ship and wounding some crew members. Tromp in return fired a warning broadside from his flagship Brederode. Blake in turn fired a broadside and a five-hour battle ensued. The fighting continued until nightfall, where both sides withdrew, the battle having no distinct victor.

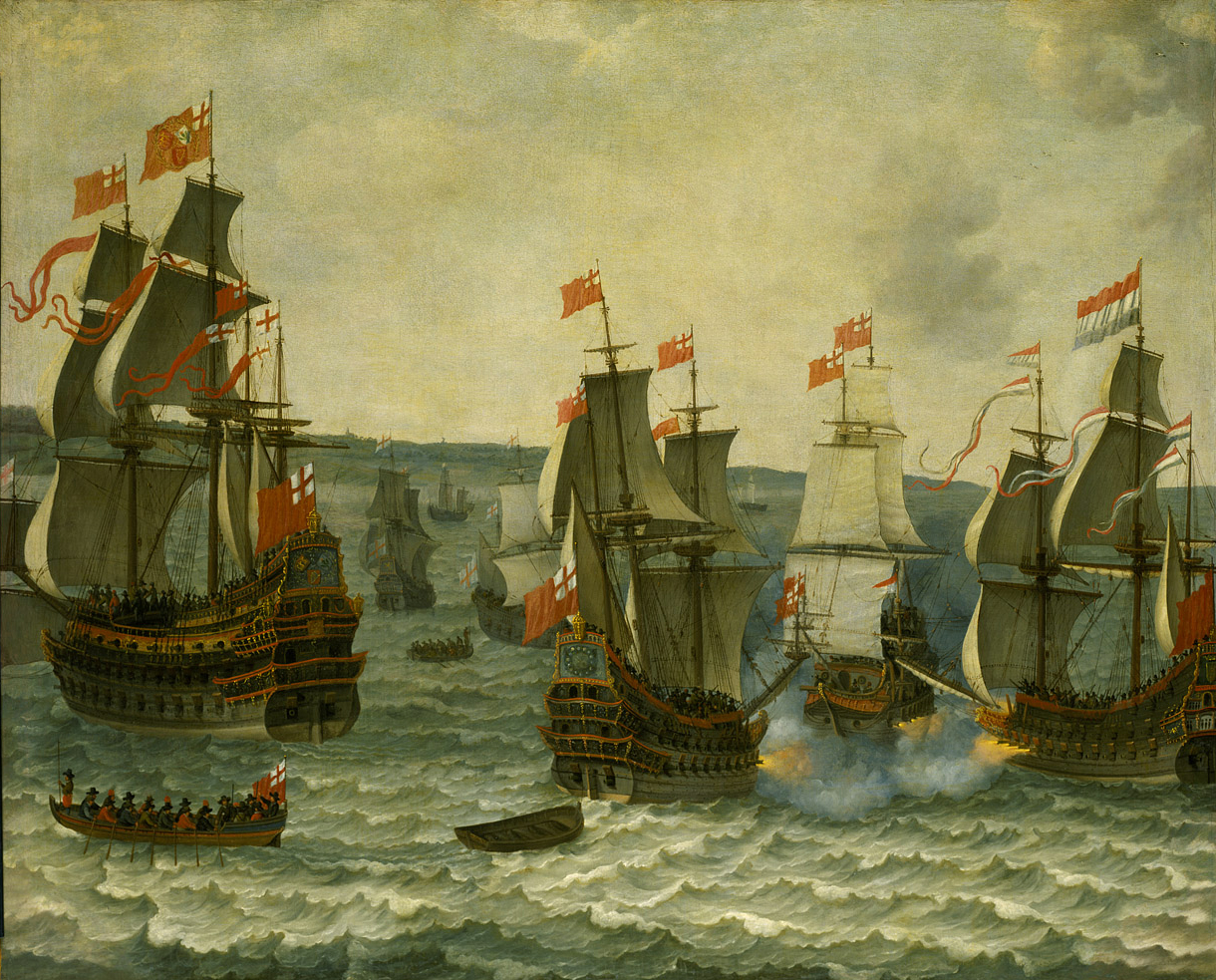
Battle of the Kentish Knock was a major English victory.

The proper war started in June with an English campaign against the Dutch East Indies, Baltic and fishing trades by Blake, in command of around 60 ships. On 5 October 1652 Dutch Vice-Admiral Witte Corneliszoon de With, underestimating the strength of the English, attempted to attack Blake, but due to the weather it was Blake who attacked on 8 October 1652 in the Battle of the Kentish Knock, sending de With back to the Netherlands in defeat. The English government seemed to think that the war was over and sent ships away to the Mediterranean. Blake had only 42 warships when he was attacked and decisively defeated by 88 Dutch ships under Tromp on 9 December 1652 in the Battle of Dungeness, losing control of the English Channel to the Dutch. Meanwhile, the ships sent away had also been defeated in the Battle of Leghorn. Following the navy's poor performance at Dungeness, Blake demanded that the Lords Commissioners of the Admiralty enact major reforms. They complied by, among other things, enacting Articles of War to reinforce the authority of an admiral over his captains.

After the Battle of Dungeness in November 1652 the Dutch navy was in control of the English Channel through the winter of 1652–1653, allowing trade and commerce to once again resume. During this time, however, the English fleet had been refitted and reorganised, and by the beginning of February the English fleet numbered about eighty ships, which were promptly put into operation on 11 February under the joint command of the generals-at-sea Blake, Monck and Deane, setting the stage for the Battle of Portland. Blake's main objective was to intercept Lieutenant-Admiral Tromp, who was expected to escort a large merchant fleet from the Mediterranean to the Netherlands. The English fleet was divided into three squadrons, the Red, Blue and White, each with its own vice- and rear-admirals which for the first time in British naval history established an ordered command hierarchy for the British Navy. Blake, aboard his flagship the Triumph, was in command of the red squadron, with Monck in command of the Blue and Penn in command of the white. Blake was informed that Tromp's fleet was approaching and was no more than forty leagues to the west. Tromp had the great responsibility of getting his merchant convey home to safety, but when he learned that Blake was waiting for him in the channel, and that his fleet of warships was about the same size as Blake's fleet, and with the weather gage in his favor, he decided to take the initiative and move on Blake's fleet, leaving his convoy of merchant ships about four miles up wind.

While Blake's fleet had recently been outfitted with fresh supplies and ammunition, Tromp had been out at sea since November and was short of ammunition. Knowing that Tromp's fleet and convoy of merchant ships had to pass his way to reach their destination, Blake was not compelled to go out searching for them. On 18 February the Dutch fleet of seventy-five ships came into Blake's view, but his squadrons had not yet grouped into their formations, having arrived there in haste at short notice. His red squadron was in position, but the White squadron was several miles to the east, while the Blue squadron was at some distance to the west, leaving Blake with about a dozen ships to face the entire Dutch fleet, which had the wind in their favor. Tromp seized the advantageous opportunity and moved on Blake's lone squadron, and at eight in the morning a furious battle commenced. Subsequently, Blake's squadron endured heavy damage and casualties, with 100 lives lost on the Triumph, but the squadron was able to keep the Dutch fleet at bay. While the battle raged furiously, Blake was severely wounded in his thigh, while his flag-captain Andrew Ball was killed. Several hours would pass before Blake's other squadrons arrived at the scene. As Tromp's ships began to use up their supply of powder, they retreated from the engagement and headed for home, while the withdrawal of the remaining ships turned into a desperate flight for survival. Thanks to its command of the sea, the fleet was able to supply Cromwell's army with provisions as it successfully marched on Scotland. By the end of 1652 the various English colonies in the Americas had also been secured.

At the Battle of the Gabbard on 12 and 13 June 1653 Blake reinforced the ships of Generals Richard Deane and George Monck and decisively defeated the Dutch fleet, sinking or capturing 17 ships without losing one. Now also the North Sea was brought under English control, and the Dutch fleet was blockaded in various ports until the Battle of Scheveningen, where Tromp was killed.

Peace with the Dutch achieved, Blake sailed in October 1654 with 24 warships as commander-in-chief of the Mediterranean Fleet, successfully deterring the Duke of Guise from conquering Naples. In 1656, the year before his death, Blake was appointed Lord Warden of the Cinque Ports.

=== Bay of Tunis ===
In April 1655 Blake was selected by Cromwell to sail into the Mediterranean again to extract compensation from the Duke of Tuscany, the Knights of Malta, and the piratical states of North Africa, that had been attacking English shipping. The Dey of Tunis was the only one who refused compensation, while also refusing to return captured British sailors held as slaves. and further negotiations became futile. Blake, aboard his flagship George, at first, needing to replenish water and other supplies, withdrew his fleet to Trapani, leading the Dey to assume his fleet had retreated, and on 3 April 1655 he returned to Porto Farina. The following morning Blake, with fifteen ships, prepared for an attack on the castle and ships in the harbour which were protected by twenty cannon in the castle, along with other defensive works along the shore. During the assault Blake destroyed the two shore batteries and nine Algerian ships with continual cannon fire from Blake's ships, while the wind off the sea blew the intense smoke from the guns at the castle and into the town, obscuring the enemy's view. His crews boarded the ships docked in the harbour one at a time and set them ablaze, and within hours they were all reduced to scorched timber and ashes. With only twenty-five killed and forty wounded, it was the first time shore batteries had been neutralised without landing men ashore. Hoping that he had not exceeded his orders, Blake, upon submitting his report to Cromwell, found him most gracious and appreciative of his efforts. At this time Blake received orders to proceed off Cadiz, and carry on hostilities against Spain, with the objective of intercepting the Plate ships and to intercept reinforcements intended for Spanish forces in the West Indies.

=== Anglo-Spanish War ===
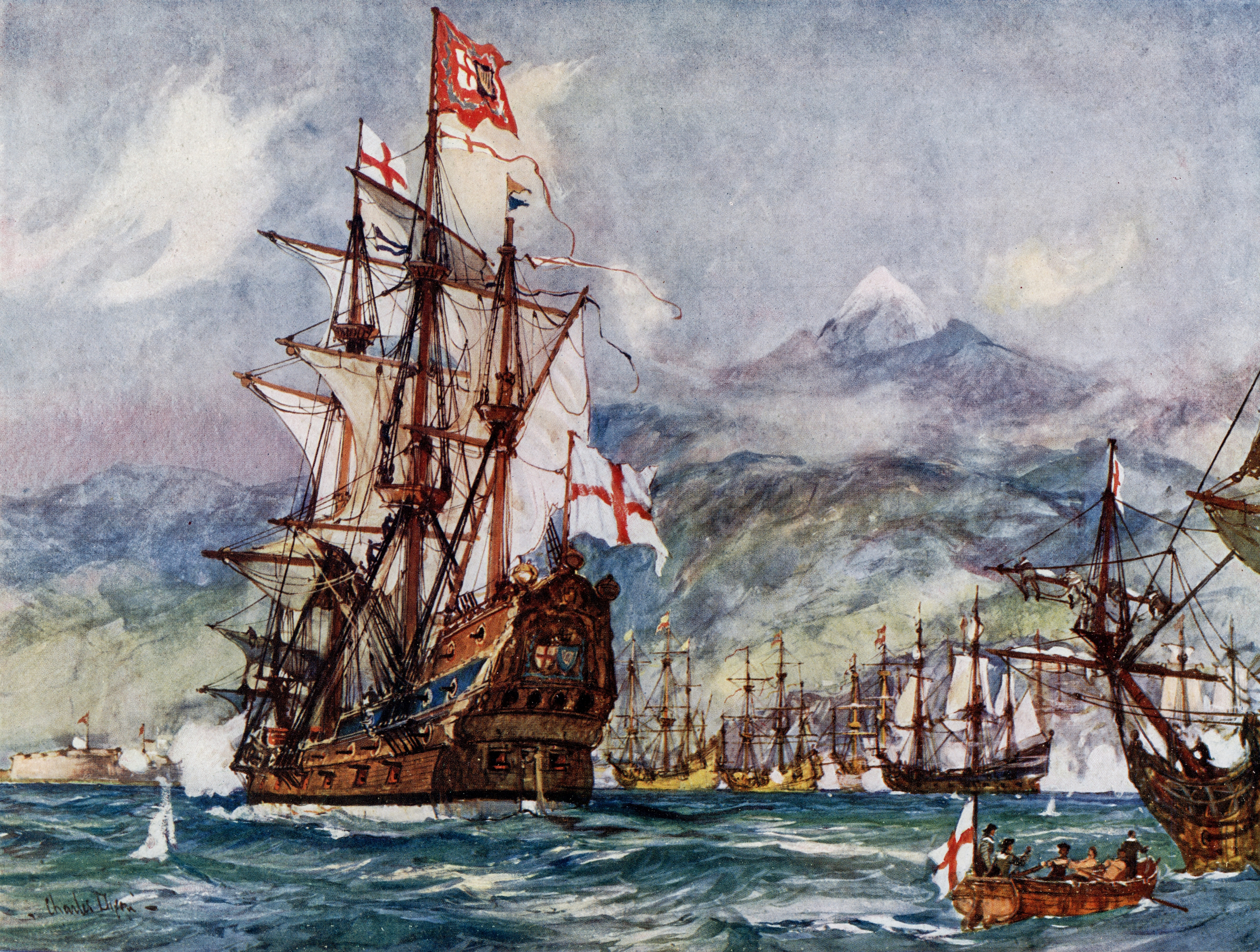
Blake's flagship George at the Battle of Santa Cruz de Tenerife in 1657

In February 1656 commercial rivalry with Spain was soon turned to war. In the Anglo-Spanish War Blake blockaded Cádiz, during which one of his captains, Richard Stayner, destroyed most of the Spanish plate fleet at the Battle of Cádiz. A galleon of treasure was captured, and the overall loss to Spain was estimated at £2 million. Blake maintained the blockade throughout the winter, the first time the fleet had stayed at sea over winter.

On 20 April 1657 Blake totally destroyed another armed merchant convoy, the Spanish West Indian fleet, in the Battle of Santa Cruz de Tenerife—a port so well fortified that it was thought to be impregnable to attack from the sea—for the loss of just one ship. With expert marksmanship Blake's artillery successfully laid waste to most of the fort and destroyed or reduced the Spanish fleet to ashes. Although the silver had already been landed, Blake's victory delayed its arrival at the royal treasury of the Spanish government and earned the new English Navy respect throughout Europe. As a reward Blake was given an expensive diamond ring by Cromwell. The action also earned him respect 140 years later from Lord Nelson who lost his arm there in a failed attack; in a letter written on 17 April 1797, to Admiral Sir John Jervis, Nelson wrote "I do not reckon myself equal to Blake", before going on to outline the plans for his own attack.

== Final days and legacy ==
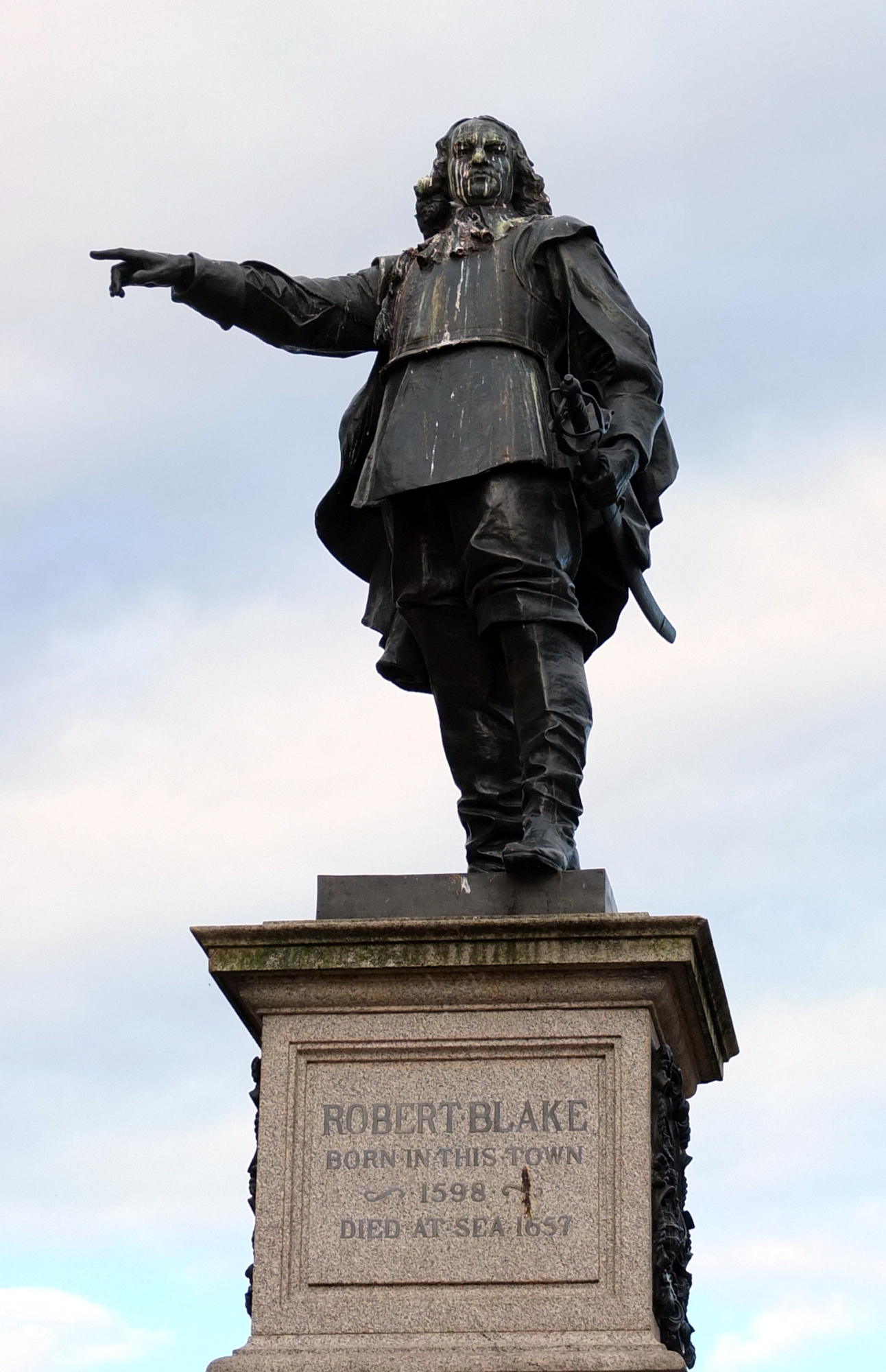
Statue of Robert Blake in Bridgwater, Somerset

On 13 March 1655, Blake, still in active service while aboard the Naseby, made out his last will and testament. The first item, consisting of a paragraph, began with, "I bequeath my soul unto the hands of my most merciful Redeemer, the Lord Jesus Christ ...". He left the towns of Bridgwater and Taunton £100 each to be dispersed among the poor. He left his brother Humphrey his manor house, while leaving his other brothers considerable sums of money. Among other items bequeathed to other family members and friends, he left the gold chain that was awarded him by the Parliament to his nephew Robert, son of his deceased brother.

After again cruising off Cadiz for a while, Blake, aboard his flagship George, turned for home, but on 7 August 1657 at ten o'clock in the morning he died of old wounds within sight of Plymouth where a hero's welcome was planned for him. After lying in state in the Queen's House, Greenwich, he was given a full state funeral moved to Westminster Abbey where the procession they were received by a military guard and saluted with salvoes of artillery before he was interred. Present at the ceremony were Oliver Cromwell and the members of the Council of State (although his internal organs had earlier been buried at St Andrew's Church, Plymouth). After the restoration of the monarchy his body was exhumed in 1661 and placed in a common grave in St Margaret's churchyard, adjoining the Abbey, on the orders of the new king, Charles II.

In Westminster Abbey, a stone memorial of Blake, unveiled on 27 February 1945, can be found in the south choir aisle. St Margaret's Church, where he was reburied, has a stained-glass window depicting his life, together with a brass plaque to his memory, unveiled on 18 December 1888. A modern stone memorial to Blake and the other Parliamentarians reburied in the churchyard has been set into the external wall to the left of the main entrance of the church.

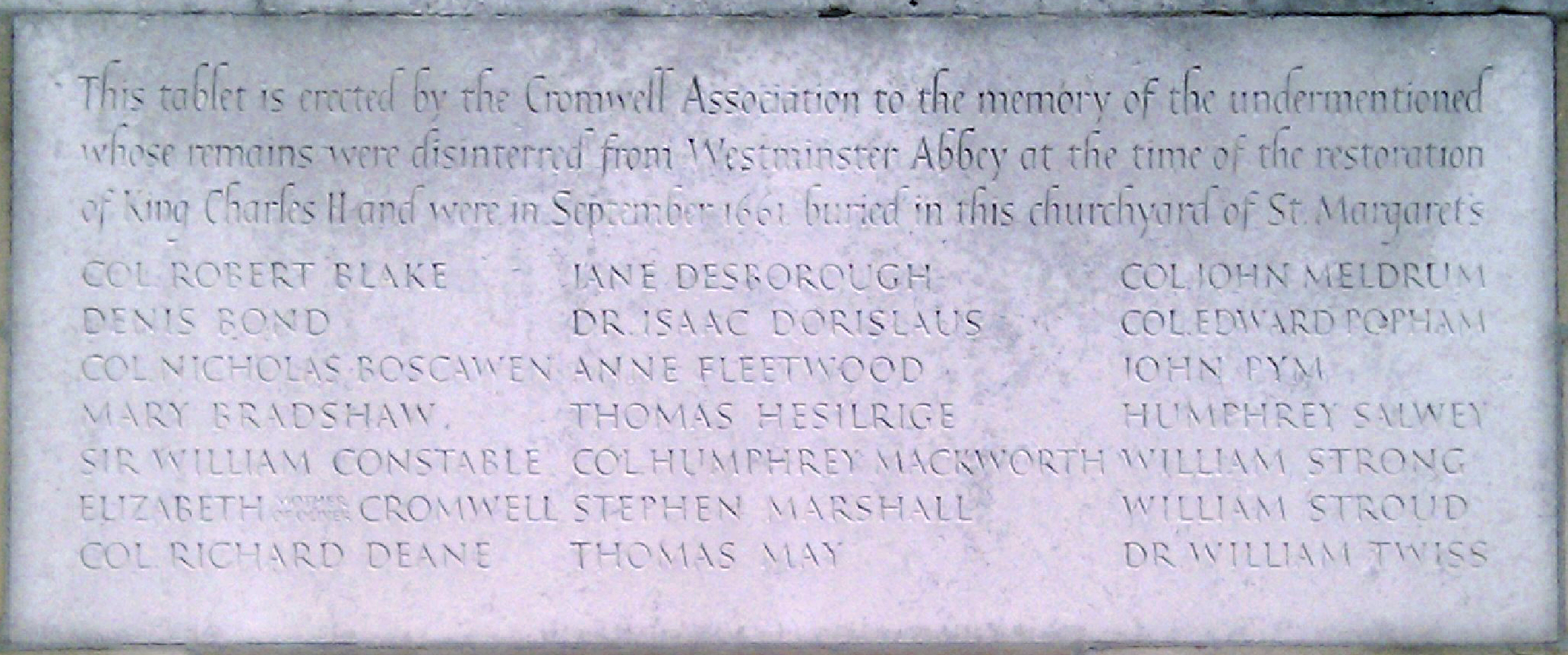
Memorial marking the reburial of Robert Blake and other Parliamentarians outside St Margaret's, Westminster

In 1926 the house in Bridgwater, where it is believed that Blake was born, was purchased and turned into the Blake Museum, where a room is devoted to him and his exploits.

Blake is one of four maritime figures depicted with a statue on the facade of Deptford Town Hall, in the London Borough of Lewisham. Blake and his flagship Triumph are featured on a second class postage stamp issued in 1982.

In 2007 various events took place in Bridgwater, Somerset, from April to September to commemorate the 350th anniversary of the death of Blake. These included a civic ceremony on 8 July 2007 and a 17th-century market on 15 July 2007. In the Royal Navy a series of ships have carried the name HMS Blake in honour of the general at sea.

As noted by one of Blake's biographers, Blake was responsible for the "... birth of a real British Navy ... Hitherto, expeditions had been entrusted to Court favourites, whose main inspiration was not patriotism, but gain; now, patriotism, not profit, was to be its watchword; glory, not gold, its reward."

== In literature ==
Blake is the subject of a poetical illustration that recalls his exploits in Robert Blake, General and Admiral of the Parliamentary Forces. by Letitia Elizabeth Landon to an engraving by John Cochran after Briggs in Fisher's Drawing Room Scrap Book, 1837.

== Relatives ==
Blake's younger brother, Benjamin Blake (1614–1689), served under Robert, emigrated to Carolina in 1683, and was the father of Joseph Blake, who was appointed governor of South Carolina by governor John Archdale when he returned to England. Joseph's term lasted from 1696 to 1700.

Blake's brother Samual Blake fought under Popham before being killed during a brawl with a Royalist officer and his men 1645.

A collateral relative was the historian Robert Blake, Baron Blake (1916–2003).

== See also ==
- British ensign
- Military history of the United Kingdom
- Glossary of nautical terms: (A–L), (M–Z)

== Bibliography ==
- Baumber, Michael (1989). General-at-sea: Robert Blake and the seventeenth-century revolution in naval warfare. London: J. Murray. ISBN 978-0-71954-7065.
- Baumber, Michael (2004). Oxford Dictionary of National Biography: in association with the British Academy: From the earliest times to the year 2000: Robert Blake. Vol. VI. Oxford University Press. ISBN 0-19-861356-3.
- Capp, Bernard S. (1989). Cromwell's navy: the fleet and the English Revolution, 1648–1660. Oxford, England: Clarendon Press; New York: Oxford University Press. ISBN 978-0-19820-1151.
- Clowes, William Laird (1897–1903). The Royal Navy, a history from the earliest times to the present. Vol. II. London: S. Low, Marston.
- Dixon, William Hepworth (1852). Robert Blake, admiral and general at sea. London: Chapman and Hall.
- Gardiner, Samuel Rawson (1897). History of the commonwealth and protectorate, 1649–1660. Vol. I. Longmans, Green and Company.
- Gardiner, Samuel Rawson (1897). History of the commonwealth and protectorate, 1649–1660. Vol. II. Longmans, Green and Company.
- Hannay, David (1886). Admiral Blake. New York: D. Appleton and Company.
- Hyde, Edward (1717). The History of the Rebellion and Civil Wars in England: Begun in the Year 1641. Vol. III, pt.ii.
- Knight, Frank (1971). General-at-Sea: The Life of Admiral Robert Blake. London: Macdonald. ISBN 0-356-03694-4
- Laughton, John Knox (1907) [1899]. From Howard to Nelson: twelve sailors. London: Heinemann.
  1899, Lawrence and Bullen, Ltd. publication
- Laughton, John Knox (1886). Stephen, Leslie (ed.). Dictionary of National Biography: Robert Blake. Vol. V. New York: Macmillan. pp. 170–179.
- Mirza, Umair (1911). Encyclopedia Britannica. Vol. IV.
- Moore, Alexander (2016). Blake, Joseph. South Carolina Encyclopedia.
- Nelson, Horatio (1845). Harris, Nicholas (ed.). The dispatches and letters of Vice Admiral Lord Viscount Nelson, with notes. Vol. II. London: Henry Colburn, publisher.
- Powell, John Rowland (1972). Robert Blake; general-at-sea. New York: Crane, Russak. ISBN 978-0-00211-7265.
- Southey, Robert (1919) [1831]. The life of Horatio, Lord Nelson. London & Toronto: J. M. Dent & sons ltd.
- Spalding, Thomas Alfred (1899). A life of Richard Badiley, vice-admiral of the fleet. Archibald Constable and Co.
- Yexley, Lionel (1911). Our fighting sea men. London: Stanley Paul & Co.
- "Robert Blake". Westminster Abbey.
- "The Scilly Isles, 1651". British Civil Wars Project (BCW).
- "Who Was Blake" (PDF). Bridgwater Blake Museum. Archived from the original (PDF) on 27 September 2020.
- "Who was Robert Blake?". Blakemuseum.org.uk. Archived from the original on 2 October 2011.
- Evans, Roger (2008). "Admiral Blake – Bridgwater Town Council". Bridgwatertowncouncil.gov.uk.
- "House of Commons Journal". Journal of the House of Commons. 6 (5). Institute of Historical Research: 154–157. March 1649.
- David, Plant (2010). "Blake in the Mediterranean". British Civil Wars Project (BCW).

Preceded by Thomas Kelsey	Lord Warden of the Cinque Ports; 1656–1657	Succeeded by Lord Winchilsea
