= Battle of Cádiz (1656) =

1656 battle

- Part of the Anglo–Spanish War (1654–1660)
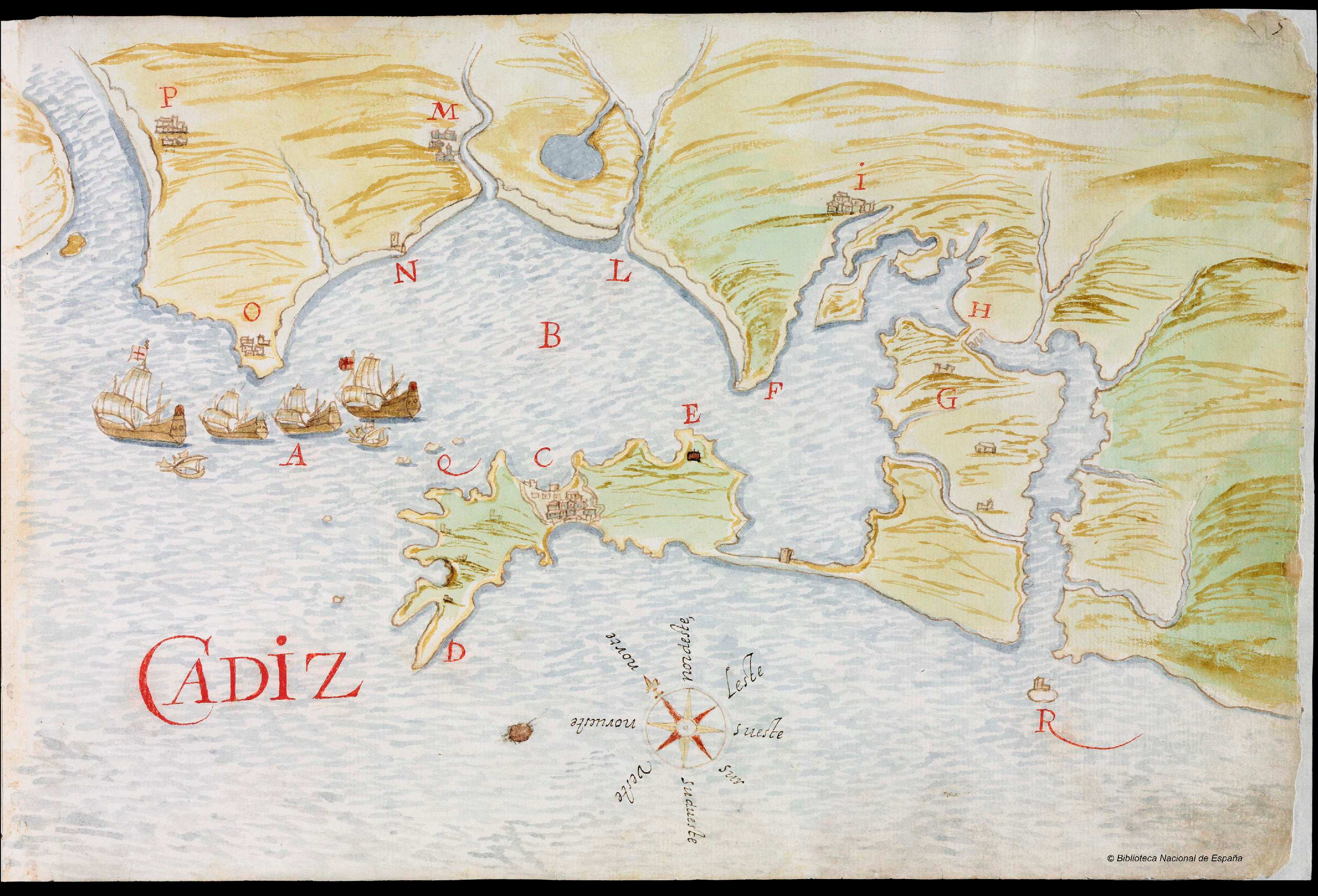
- Map of the Bay of Cádiz (1632)
Date	9 September 1656
Location	Bay of Cádiz 36.5333°N 6.28333°W
Result	English victory

Belligerents
Spain	(The Protectorate) England

Commanders and leaders
(Spain) Marcos del Puerto (Spain) Juan de Hoyos †	(The Protectorate) Richard Stayner

Strength
8 ships	8 ships

Casualties and losses
5 ships	None

The Battle of Cádiz was an operation in the Anglo–Spanish War (1654–1660) in which an English fleet destroyed or captured the ships of a Spanish treasure fleet off Cádiz.

== Background ==
After the ending of the Anglo-Dutch War, Oliver Cromwell turned his attention to England's traditional enemy, Spain. He was seeking a return to a policy of attacks on Spanish trade and shipping routes, whose success in the time of Elizabeth I had acquired a legendary status.

In August 1655, Robert Blake had blockaded the port of Cádiz in the hope of intercepting a Spanish treasure fleet, but it did not sail and remained in the Americas. The fleet sailed to England for a refit in October 1655, before returning the following April. During this time a Spanish fleet had docked in Cádiz, and the harbor was deemed too well defended to attack successfully. Consequently, the two generals leading the English fleet (Blake and Edward Montagu) sailed for Tangier to take on water and supplies. From Tangier the best ships in the fleet sailed to Lisbon to support the ratification of a treaty between Portugal and England, before returning full attention to the blockade. This continued throughout summer 1656 as the Spanish avoided any aggressive actions, allowing the majority of the English fleet to raid ports all over Spain and North Africa (including Vigo and Málaga, where they sunk 9 Spanish ships.) 10 of the 40 ships in the fleet were recalled to England in July, before all but 8 of the remaining ships sailed to Lisbon once again to restock the fleet. These 8 ships were left in the command of Richard Stayner in order to continue the blockade of Cádiz.

== Battle ==
Stayner's fleet was stationed in Cádiz bay to begin with, but was forced out by a westerly gale. On the evening of September 8, the squadron sighted one of the two annual Spanish treasure fleets. The treasure fleet, under the command of Marcos del Puerto, consisted of two galleons, three private merchantmen, two armed cargo ships (hulks) and a captured Portuguese vessel. They had been anchored in Havana for two months waiting for some warship escorts, but the earlier (still ongoing) blockade of Cádiz by Blake had prevented any from reaching the flota.

In the gathering darkness, the Spaniards mistook the English squadron for a group of fishing boats and took no evasive action. As dawn broke on the morning of 9 September 1656, three of the English ships engaged the Spanish (the remainder of the squadron was facing the wrong way to attack at that time.) Captain Stayner, aboard the Speaker (64 guns), engaged and captured the Jesus Maria San Jose (28), one of the flota's galleons under the command of rear admiral Juan de Hoyos. With its capture came its treasure of 45 tons of silver, 700 chests of indigo, and 700 chests of sugar. Meanwhile, Captain Anthony Earning of the Bridgewater (52) engaged the other galleon under the command of vice admiral Juan Rodriguez Calderón. After a lengthy battle, the galleon was sunk after its crew set it on fire while abandoning ship. only 90 of its crew survived, with one of the many Spanish casualties being Francisco López de Zúñiga, 2nd Marquess of Baides, the former Governor of Chile. His wife and daughter died also, and his two young sons were taken prisoner. The Plymouth (52) sank one of the Spanish merchantmen, sending 60,000 pieces of eight being carried as cargo down with the ship. Captain John Harman of the Tredagh (52) captured another merchantman intact with all its cargo. The third merchantman was beached, while the Spanish admiral Marcus del Puerto escaped on the San Francisco y San Diego to Cádiz harbour along with the 2 other smallest ships.

== Aftermath ==
The battle was a huge loss for the Spanish, with the English taking nearly £1 million in goods, another £250,000 in Silver, as well as hundreds of thousands of pounds worth of treasure lost to the ocean depths.

== Ships involved ==
English

- Speaker (64) (Richard Stayner)
- Tredagh (52) (John Harman)
- Plymouth (52)
- Bridgewater (52) (Anthony Earning)
- Diamond (60) (Gilbert Gott)
- 3 more ships

Spanish

- San Francisco y San Diego (Galleon, capitana) (26) (Marcus del Puerto) : escaped
- San Francisco Javier (Merchantman) (30) (Francisco de Esquivel) : set itself on fire and exploded
- Victoria (Galleon) (20) (Juan Rodriguez Calderón) : set itself on fire and sank
- Jesus, Maria y Jose (Galleon, almiranta) (28) (Juan de Hoyos) : captured
- Profeta Elias (Merchantman) (26) (Juan de la Torre) : captured
- Rosario (Merchantman) (24) (José de Paredes) : beached
- Patache (José de Pimienta) escaped
- Captured Portuguese merchantman : escaped
