= English Army =

Army of the Kingdom of England from 1661 to 1707

- The royal arms of England
- Active: 1661–1707
- Country: Kingdom of England
- Allegiance: The Crown
- Type: Army
- Engagements: Second Anglo-Dutch War; Franco-Dutch War; Monmouth Rebellion; Nine Years' War; War of the Spanish Succession

Commanders
- Captain-General: George Monck, John Churchill
- Notable commanders: Prince Rupert, James Scott, James Butler, Henri de Massue, James Stanhope

The English Army was the army of the Kingdom of England from 1661 to 1707. It was raised by King Charles II after the Stuart Restoration of 1660 saw him ascend to the English throne, and consisted partly of personnel who were veterans of either the Royalist units Charles II maintained while exiled in France or the New Model Army. The English army was the second standing army of the English state after the New Model Army, and was raised at the same time as the Irish and Scottish armies.

It consisted of a number of infantry, cavalry and artillery units, and fought in numerous conflicts in both Great Britain and abroad, including the Second and Third Anglo-Dutch wars, Nine Years' War and War of the Spanish Succession. The first English marines, which later became the Royal Marines, were formed as part of the English Army in 1664. In 1707, England was merged with the Kingdom of Scotland under the Acts of Union 1707 to form the Kingdom of Great Britain, and the English Army was merged with its Scottish counterpart to form the British Army.

== Origins ==
Primitive steps towards standing armed forces began in the Middle Ages, the Assize of Arms of 1252 issued by King Henry III provided that small landholders should be armed and trained with a bow, and those of more wealth would be required to possess and be trained with sword, dagger and longbow. That Assize referred to a class of Forty shilling freeholders, who became identified with 'yeomanry', and states "Those with land worth annual 40s–100s will be armed/trained with bow and arrow, sword, buckler and dagger".

== Tudor and Stuart organisation ==
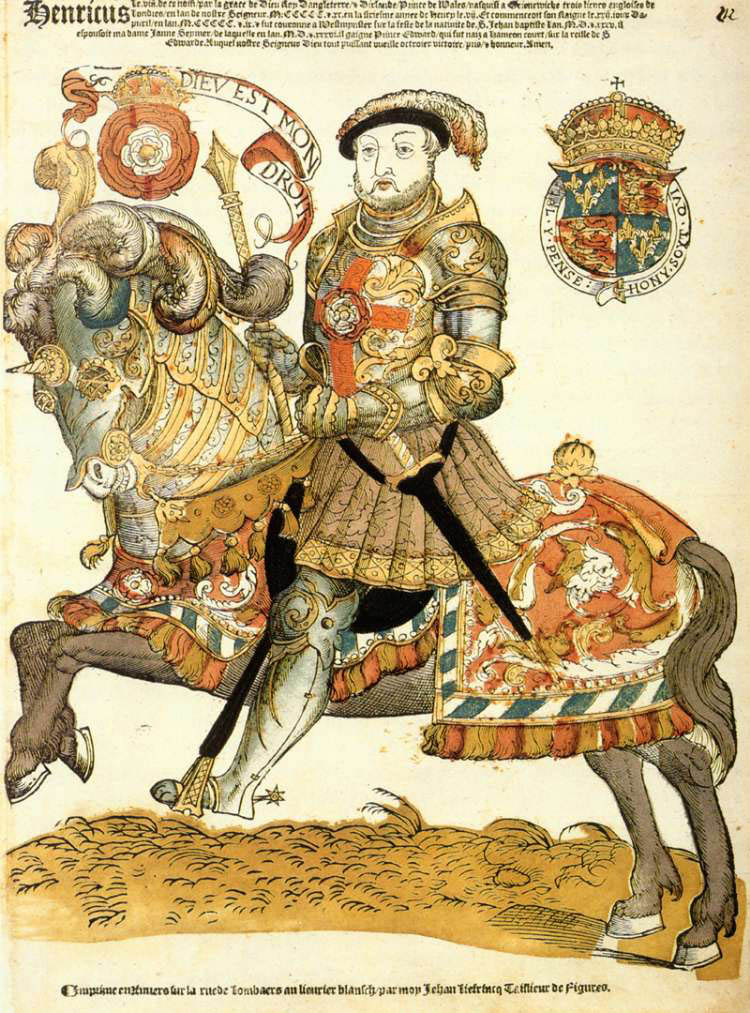
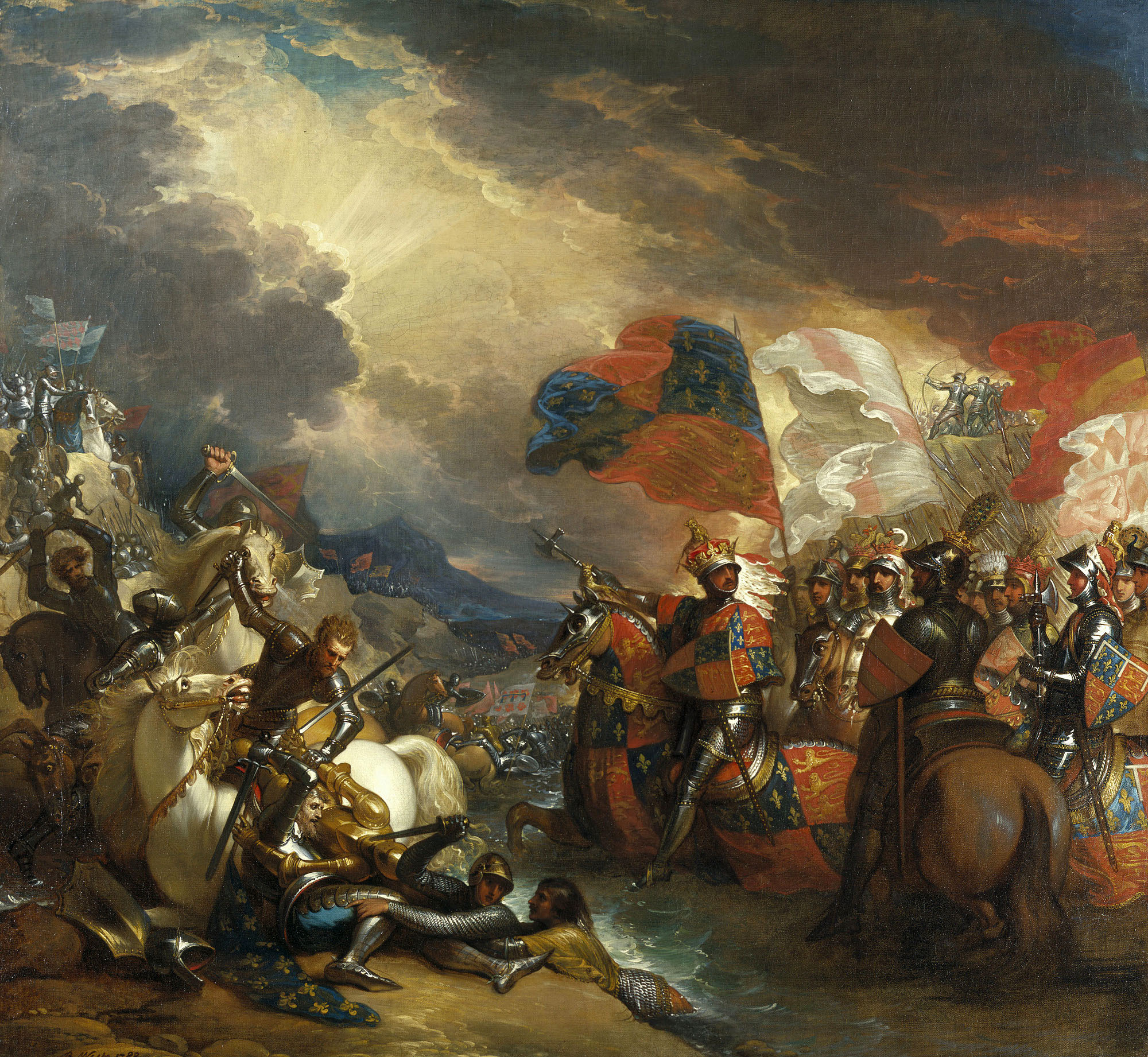
Henry VIII of England on Horseback by Hans Liefrinck (between 1561 and 1599.) (left) Edward III Crossing the Somme by Benjamin West (1788). English armies campaigned intermittently in France from the 14th century to the mid-16th century. (right)

Prior to the English Civil War in 1642 the English Tudor and Stuart monarchs maintained a personal bodyguard of Yeomen of the Guard (created by Henry VII) and the Honourable Corps of Gentlemen at Arms or "gentlemen pensioners" (created by Henry VIII), and a few locally raised companies to garrison important places such as Berwick on Tweed, Portsmouth, and Calais (before it was recaptured by France in 1558). Troops for foreign expeditions were raised on an ad hoc basis in either country by its King, when required. This was a development of the feudal concept of fief (in which a lord was obliged to raise a certain quota of knights, men-at-arms and yeomanry, in return for his right to occupy land).

In practice, noblemen and professional regular soldiers were commissioned by the monarch to supply troops, raising their quotas by indenture from a variety of sources. A Commission of Array would be used to raise troops for a foreign expedition, while various Militia Acts directed that (in theory) the entire male population who owned property over a certain amount in value, was required to keep arms at home and periodically train or report to musters. The musters were usually chaotic affairs, used mainly by the Lord Lieutenants and other officers to draw their pay and allowances, and by the troops as an excuse for a drink after perfunctory drill.

== English Civil War ==
In 1642, at the start of the English Civil War both the Royalists (Cavaliers) and Parliament (Roundheads) raised men when and where they could, and both claimed legal justification. Parliament claimed to be justified by its own recent "Militia Ordinance", while the king claimed the old-fashioned "Commissions of Array". For example, in Cornwall the Royalist leader Sir Ralph Hopton indicted the enemy before the grand jury of the county for disturbing the peace, and expelled them by using the posse comitatus. In effect, both sides assembled local forces wherever they could do so by valid written authority.

After two years of ruinous but indecisive military campaigning, Parliament passed the Self-denying Ordinance (by which members of both Houses of Parliament were deprived of military office, a measure originally introduced to replace some high-ranking officers who were suspected of disloyalty or defeatism), and created the New Model Army, the first professional standing army in Modern English history. An experienced soldier, Sir Thomas Fairfax, was appointed its Lord General. The New Model Army proved supreme in field, no more so than in the Second English Civil War which was succinctly described by Sir Winston Churchill:

The Story of the Second English Civil War is short and simple. King, Lords and Commons, landlords, merchants, the City and the countryside, bishops and presbyters, the Scottish army, the Welsh people, and the English Fleet, all now turned against the New Model Army. The Army beat the lot!

From its foundation, the New Model Army adopted social and religious policies which were increasingly at odds with those of Parliament. The Army's senior officers (the "Grandees") formed another faction, opposed both to Parliament and to the more extreme radicals (Levellers and dissenting Nonconformist sects) within the lower ranks.

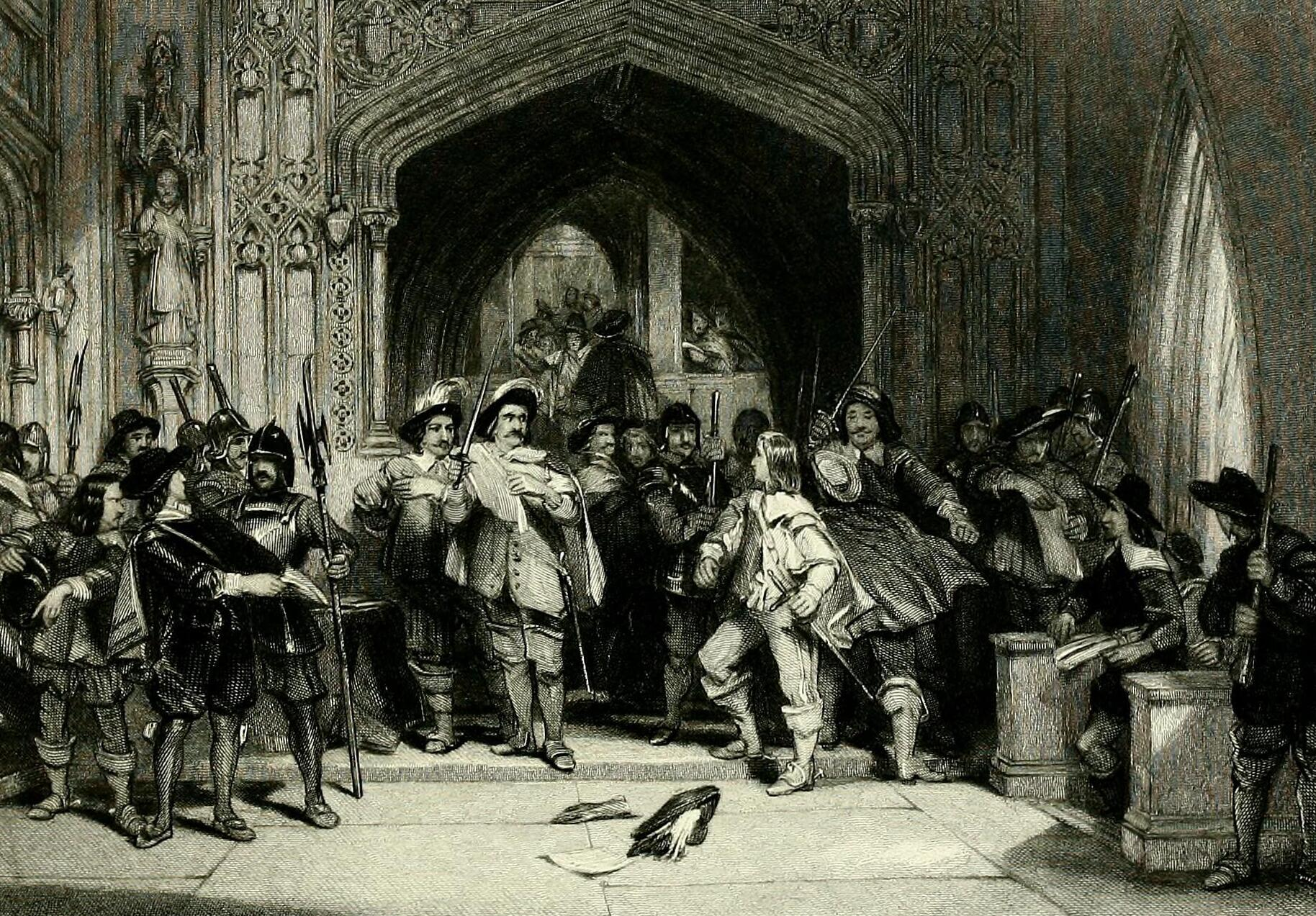
New Model Army troops carrying out Pride's Purge in 1648

In the aftermath of the Second English Civil War, Parliament was made subservient to the wishes of the Army Council whose leading political figure was Oliver Cromwell. In an episode known as Pride's Purge, New Model Army troops under Colonel Thomas Pride forcibly prevented members of the House of Commons opposed to the Army Council from attending Parliament on 6 December 1648. The resulting Rump Parliament passed the necessary legislation to have King Charles I tried and executed by beheading, and to declare England a Commonwealth.

The next two years saw the New Model Army invade first Ireland and then Scotland defeating their armies and occupying their territory. The New Model Army with the aid of English militias easily defeated a predominantly Scottish Royalist army under the command of Charles II at the Battle of Worcester on 3 September 1651 bringing the Civil War to an end.

== Interregnum ==
New Model Army cavalry at the 1650 Battle of Dunbar

During the Interregnum (1649–1660) the power of all the republican experiments in governance relied on the military might of the New Model Army, which, whenever it was called upon, was easily able to meet the challenges of its enemies, both foreign and domestic. Two particularly notable events of the interregnum were to have long-lasting effects. The first was political; the army's complete seizure of power when Cromwell dissolved the Rump Parliament in 1653 is the closest to a coup d'état that England has had, and the subsequent Rule of the Major-Generals. The other was the Battle of the Dunes, where soldiers of the New Model Army dressed in red coats astonished both their French allies and Spanish enemies by the stubborn fierceness of their assault up a sand-hill 150 feet (46 m) high and strongly defended by Spanish veterans who were forced to retreat.

It was only after the death of Oliver Cromwell and the loss of his influence that the other members of the army could not agree on an alternative to the restoration of Charles II. Even so, it was under the firm guidance and with the agreement of General George Monck of the New Model Army that the restoration of the monarchy took place in 1660.

Stuart Asquith argues:

Many authorities quote the Restoration of 1660 as the birth date of our modern British Army. While this may be true as far as continuity of unit identity is concerned, it is untrue in a far more fundamental sense. The evidence of history shows that the creation of an efficient military machine and its proving on the battlefield, predates the Restoration by 15 years. It was on the fields of Nasby, Dunbar and Dunes that the foundations of the British professional army were laid.

== Restoration ==
On 26 January 1661 Charles II issued a royal warrant which created the English Army, which was separate from the Scots Army of the Kingdom of Scotland. The Kingdom of Ireland also maintained a separate army known as the Irish Army. For some of his enforced exile King Charles II had lived at the court of Louis XIV; he had witnessed the changes introduced in France into the organisation of the troops maintained in time of peace as well as of war. On his return to England in 1660, Charles took measures to support his recently restored throne on the fidelity of his soldiers; he moreover endeavoured to fix the hitherto unstable basis of a military government. As no system is improvised, a precedent for the innovation was to be found in the history of England. Two regiments created in the reign of Henry VIII, still subsist, the Gentlemen Pensioners and the Yeomen of the Guard formed in those days a sort of transition between the system of accidental armies and permanent armies.

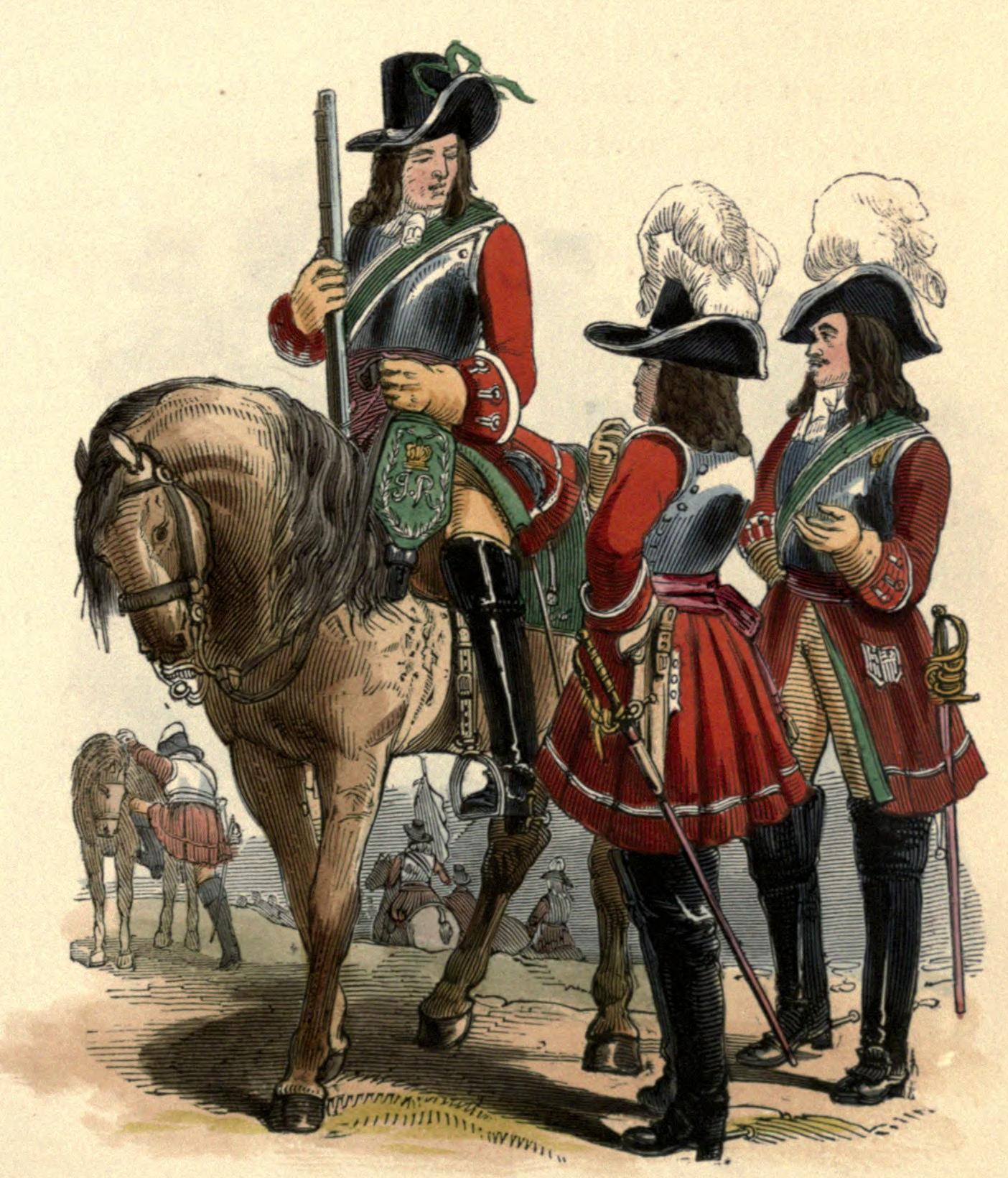
Troops of the 4th Regiment of Horse in 1687

This latter state of things was however so contrary to the constitutional customs of England that Charles II introduced it by degrees, gradually filling up the cadres of his battalions and, although contemporary writers considered it a formidable army, it did not exceed 5,000 men. King Charles put into these regiments those Cavaliers who had attached themselves to him during his exile on the European continent and had fought for him at the Battle of the Dunes against the Roundheads of the Protectorate and their French allies. For political expediency he also included some of the elements of the New Model Army. The whole force consisted of two corps of horse and five or six of infantry. It is, however, on this narrow and solid basis that the structure of the English army was gradually erected. The horse consisted of two regiments the Life Guards (formed from exiled Cavaliers); and The Blues (or The Oxford Blues), formed by Lord Oxford, out of some of the best New Model Army horse regiments. The foot regiments were Grenadier Guards (initially two regiments Lord Wentworth's Regiment and John Russell's Regiment of Guards which amalgamated in 1665), the Coldstream Guards (the New Model Army regiment of General Monck), the Royal Scots (formed from the Scotch guard in France), and the Second Queen's Royals.

It will thus be seen that the military system prevailed in England almost at the same time as in France; the two people, however, hailed in a very different manner an innovation, which changed, especially in time of peace, the character of the armed force. In France, under the absolute rule of Louis XIV, it does not appear that the establishment of standing armies met with the shadow of opposition. This was not the case in free England. Pamphleteers wrote tracts voicing the fear of a people who within living memory had experienced the Rule of the Major-Generals and had liked neither the imposition of military rule, nor the costs of keeping the New Model Army in being when the country was not at war with itself or others. People also remembered the "Eleven Years' Tyranny" of Charles I and feared that a standing army under royal command would allow monarchs in the future to ignore the wishes of Parliament.

=== Army Control ===
There was a long tradition of English resistance to a standing army until the reign of William III when the near perpetual wars with other European states made a modest standing army a necessity to defend England and to maintain its prestige in the world. But public opinion, always anxious of the bad old days, was resolved to allow itself no rest until it had defined the prerogatives of the Crown on this delicate point. Parliament finally succeeded in acquiring a control over the army, and under a general bill, commonly called the Mutiny Act, laid down the restrictions which, whilst respecting the rights of the sovereign, were likewise to shield the liberty of the people. It did this by making the standing army conditional on an annually renewed act of parliament.

==== Command and control ====
...the raising or keeping a standing army within the kingdom in time of peace, unless it be with consent of Parliament, is against law.

— Bill of Rights 1689

Supreme command of the English Army was vested in the sovereign, though monarchs (with the notable exception of King William III) seldom led their forces in battle after the Stuart Restoration. Instead, executive command was generally delegated, in time of war, to a soldier. In 1660, erstwhile parliamentarian commander General Monck was appointed captain general by King Charles II on his restoration and was given wide-ranging powers. Following his death in 1670 command was vested in a committee of colonels for a time; subsequently, individuals were from time to time appointed commander-in-chief with regard to particular actions or particular geographical areas, and the Duke of Monmouth served briefly as captain general from 1678 to 1679. A captain general was not appointed either by James II or William III; but in 1702 Queen Anne appointed her husband generalissimo and the Duke of Marlborough captain general.

c. 1672 portrait of a lieutenant colonel of the 1st Troop of Horse Guards

Strategic control of the army was in the hands of the Privy Council. By the early the eighteenth century, the power to raise an army, to issue marching orders and to administer army pay and finances lay with the Secretary at War, a member of the Government. (In origin the Secretary at War had been secretary to the captain general; but at times when no captain general or Commander-in-Chief was appointed the Secretary took on greater importance, gaining access to the sovereign and counter-signing orders; until, even when a new captain general was appointed, the Secretary at War retained distinct responsibilities and functioned independently.) An earlier official, the Treasurer at War, did not outlast the Interregnum.

The captain general was assisted by a number of 'general officers' in the wake of the Restoration (called 'general' officers to distinguish them from those with 'particular' responsibility, e.g. to a regiment, rather than to the army as a whole): the Commissary General of the Musters (1660), the pay master general (from 1661), the surgeon general (1664), scoutmaster general (1664–1689) and the judge advocate general (1666); these were later joined by the adjutant-general (from 1680), the quartermaster-general (1686), the Provost marshal general and others.

In 1679, the captain general being absent, a lieutenant-general was appointed to act in his stead (Lord Gerard of Brandon). Later, in 1685, King James II created three lieutenants-general 'over all our Forces, as well Horse as Foot'; three majors-general were also appointed at the same time along with several 'brigadeers' (also referred to as colonels of brigade and brigadeers-general). The first appointment of a full general (apart from the captain general) was in 1689.

== Operations ==
Line infantryman, grenadier and pikeman of the Earl of Huntingdon's Regiment of Foot in 1686

The Earl of Derby's Regiment of Foot at the 1704 Battle of Blenheim

The Second Anglo-Dutch War was predominately a maritime war but English army soldiers were involved in Holmes's Bonfire (19–20 August 1666), the Raid on the Medway (June 1667), the Battle of Landguard Fort (2 July 1667), the Capture of Cayenne (1667), and Recapture of Fort Zeelandia (1667). The Third Anglo-Dutch War (1672–1674) was a maritime war, but English soldiers and officers (including John Churchill (the future Duke of Marlborough) saw service under French command (for example at the Siege of Maastricht (1673)). The Blackheath Army of freshly-raised regiments was intended to take part an expedition to Zeeland in 1673, but this had to be abandoned following the naval defeat at the Battle of Texel (August 1673).

After the marriage of Mary, the daughter of the James, Duke of York, to William of Orange, the English sent an expeditionary force (with its own services and supply chain) to Flanders in 1678 to join the Dutch against the French in the Franco-Dutch War. The expeditionary force was commanded by the Duke of Monmouth. The English force saw little action but some British units saw action at the Battle of Saint-Denis (the last battle of the war). During the battle, a Scottish regiment under the command of Lieutenant-Colonel Dougles attacked the French camp and the Anglo-Dutch Brigade fought in the vanguard of the Dutch Spanish army suffering many casualties.

The Monmouth Rebellion and the Battle of Sedgemoor (6 July 1685).

- Glorious Revolution(1688)
- Williamite War in Ireland (1688–1691)
- Nine Years War (1688–1697)
  - King William's War (1688–1697).

War of the Spanish Succession (1701–1714)

== Amalgamation into the British Army ==
Shortly after the Act of Union in 1707 the English and Scottish armies were amalgamated to form the British Army.

The order of seniority for the most senior line regiments in the British Army is based on the order of seniority in the English army. Scottish and Irish regiments were only allowed to take a rank in the English army from the date of their arrival in England or the date when they were first placed on the English establishment. For example, in 1694 a board of general officers was convened to decide upon the rank of English, Irish, and Scots regiments serving in the Netherlands, when the regiment that became known as the Scots Greys was designated as the 4th Dragoons because there were three English regiments raised prior to 1688, when the Scot Greys were first placed on the English establishment. In 1713, when a new board of general officers was convened to decide upon the rank of several regiments, the seniority of the Scots Greys was reassessed and was based on their entry into England in June 1685. At that time, there was only one English regiment of dragoons, so after some delay the Scots Greys obtained the rank of 2nd Dragoons in the British Army.

== See also ==
- Battle of Ethandun
- Commander-in-Chief of the Forces
- Wars of Scottish Independence
- Hundred Years' War
- Anglo-Scottish Wars
