= John Harman (Royal Navy officer) =

English officer of the Royal Navy

Admiral Sir John Harman
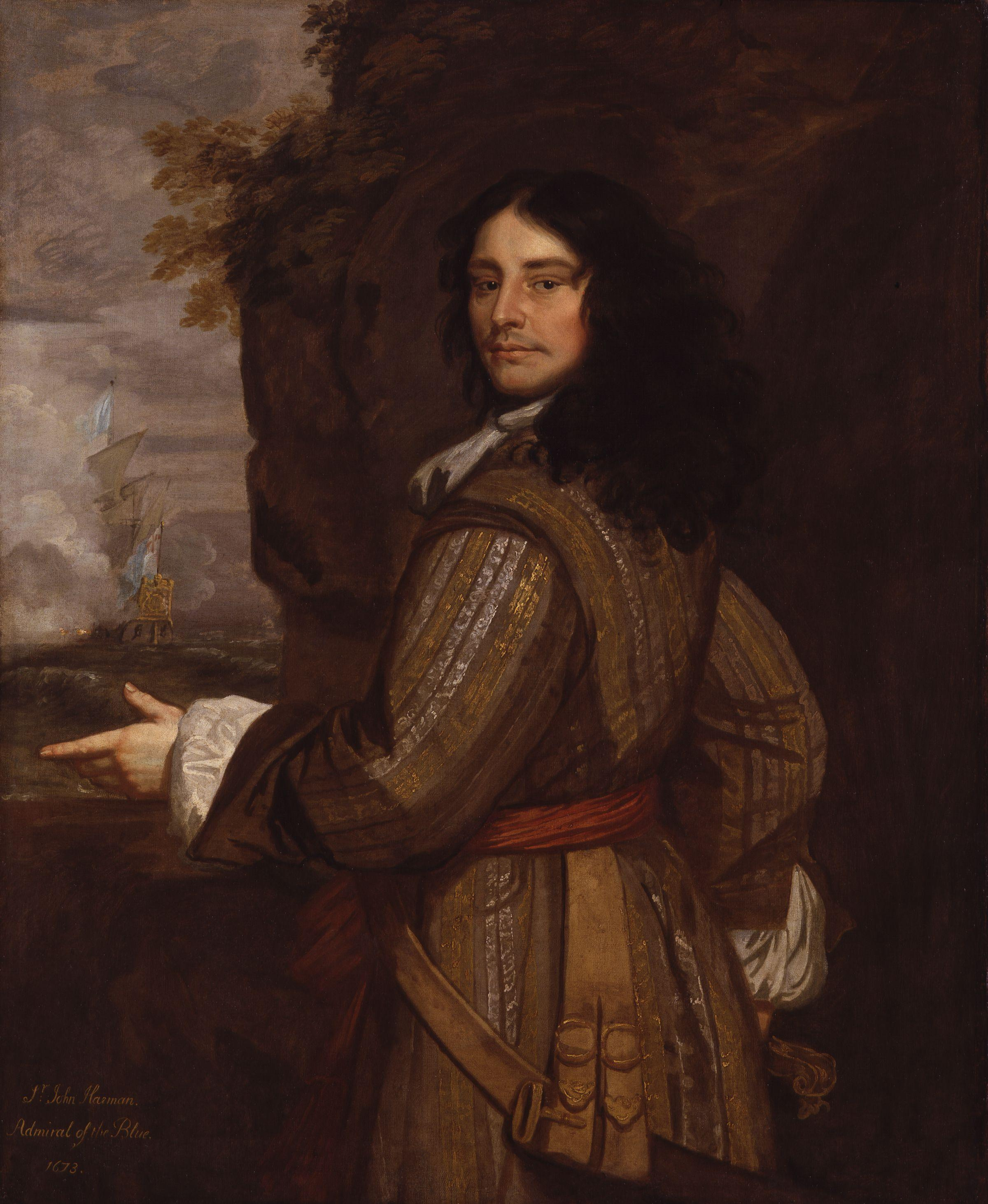
- Portrait by Sir Peter Lely, 1666
- Born: c. 1625
- Died: 11 October 1673 (aged 48 yrs); London
- Burial place: St Mary Magdalen Bermondsey
- Spouse: Katherine (died 1696)
- Military career
- Rank: Admiral
- Commands: Welcome; Diamond; Worcester; Torrington; Gloucester; Royal Charles; Resolution; Revenge; Henry; Lion; St David; London
- Conflicts: First Anglo-Dutch War; Battle of the Kentish Knock; Battle of Portland; Battle of the Gabbard; Anglo-Spanish War (1654–1660); Santa Cruz; Second Anglo-Dutch War; Battle of Lowestoft; Four Days' Battle; Martinique; Capture of Cayenne; Fort Zeelandia; Third Anglo-Dutch War; Battle of Solebay; Battle of Schooneveld; Battle of Texel

Admiral Sir John Harman (c. 1625 – 11 October 1673) was an English officer of the Royal Navy, who served first under the Commonwealth, then Charles II following the 1660 Stuart Restoration.

Harman began his career in 1646, and fought in the First Anglo-Dutch War, as well as a number of other actions. At the start of the Second Anglo-Dutch War, he was captain of HMS Gloucester, the flagship used by James, Duke of York at Lowestoft in 1665. The English won a clear victory, but Harman was criticised for his alleged failure to pursue the beaten Dutch fleet. Despite this, in 1667 he was given command of a squadron sent to re-establish the English position in the Caribbean, a task he successfully carried out.

Subsequently acquitted for his actions at Lowestoft, he became Rear Admiral in 1672 and served in all three major actions of the Third Anglo-Dutch War. Promoted Admiral in August 1673, he succeeded Prince Rupert of the Rhine as commander-in-chief of the fleet, but died shortly afterwards on 11 October.

== Personal details ==
Little is known for certain of Harman's origins, although he may have been related to a family of shipowners from Suffolk. Born around 1625, he is thought to be the brother of Philip Harman, who worked as an upholsterer in London, and was related by marriage to the author Samuel Pepys. Both men appear in a number of his Diary entries.

Harman had several children with his wife Katherine (died 1696), including at least three sons; James, the eldest, plus William (died 1677) and John, both of whom became officers in the Royal Navy. Their daughter, also named Katherine, outlived her brothers and died in 1718.

== Career ==
Harman first appears in official records towards the end of the First English Civil War in 1646, as commander of the Falcon, an Armed merchantman contracted by the Parliamentarian navy. Shortly after the First Anglo-Dutch War began in July 1652, he was appointed captain of the Welcome, a Fourth-rate warship captured from the Dutch, that fought at the Battle of the Kentish Knock in September. The Welcome was also present at the Battle of Portland in February 1653, then was badly damaged at the Battle of the Gabbard in June 1653.

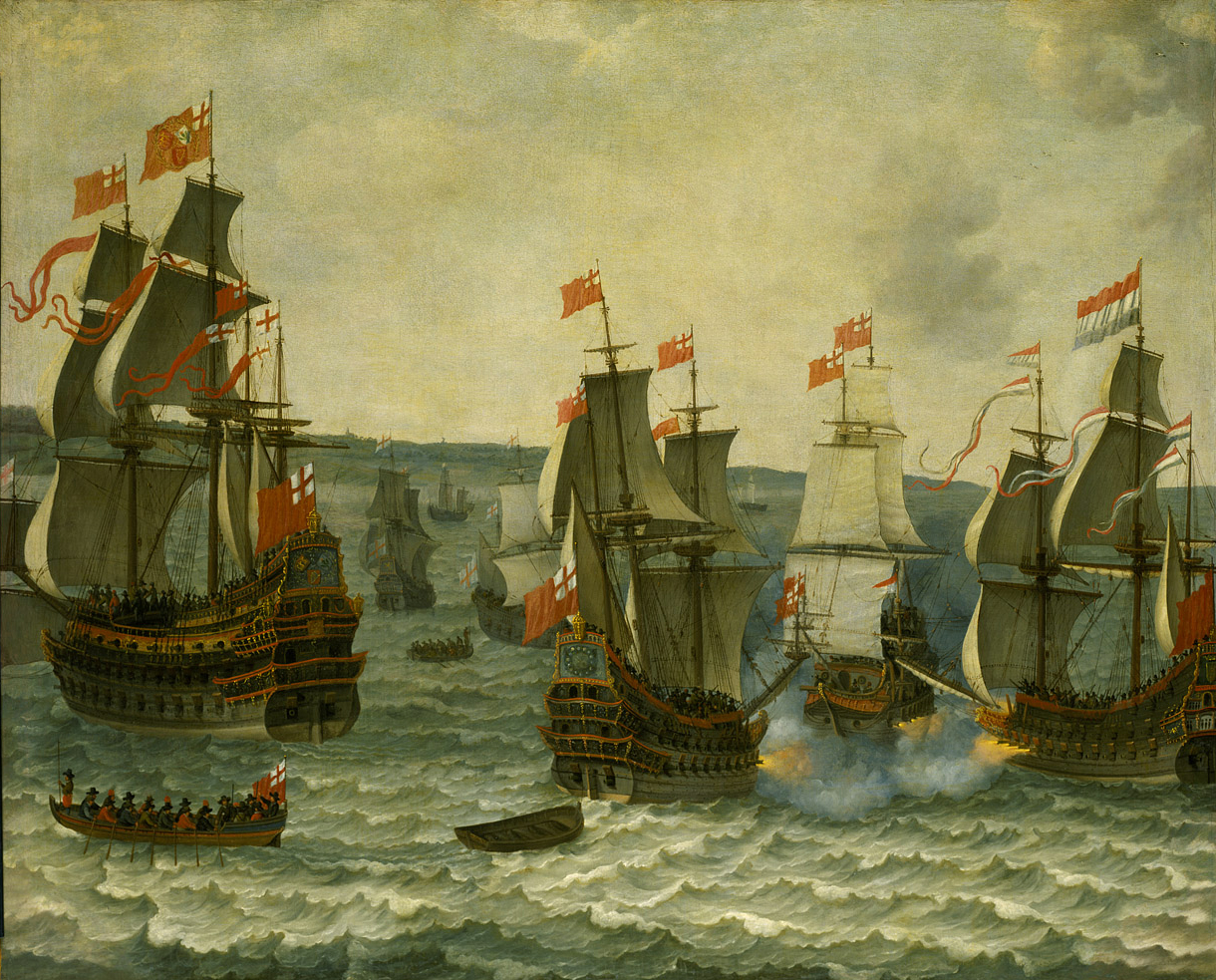
Action between ships in the First Dutch War by Abraham Willaerts

Although the war did not formally end until the Treaty of Westminster was signed in April 1654, its last major action was the Battle of Scheveningen in July 1653. In August, Harman was given command of the Diamond, and in 1654 sailed to the Mediterranean in the Diamond under Admiral Robert Blake.

He returned to England in October 1655. On 4 January 1655/56 he was given command of the Worcester and again sailed with Blake. In the Battle of Cadiz (9 September 1656) he commanded the 52-gun Tredagh in Captain Richard Stayner's squadron and captured a merchantman intact with its valuable cargo. He seems to have participated in the brilliant victory in the Battle of Santa Cruz de Tenerife (1657). Harman was appointed captain of the 58-gun Gloucester in 1664. In the spring of 1665 Harman was lieutenant of the Royal Charles, in effect captain of the ship.

== Second Anglo-Dutch War (1665–67) ==
The Second Anglo-Dutch War was declared in May 1665. During this war the English suffered from the Great Plague of 1665-66 and the Great Fire of London in September 1666. The war was concluded by the Treaty of Breda on 21 July 1667.

=== Battle of Lowestoft ===
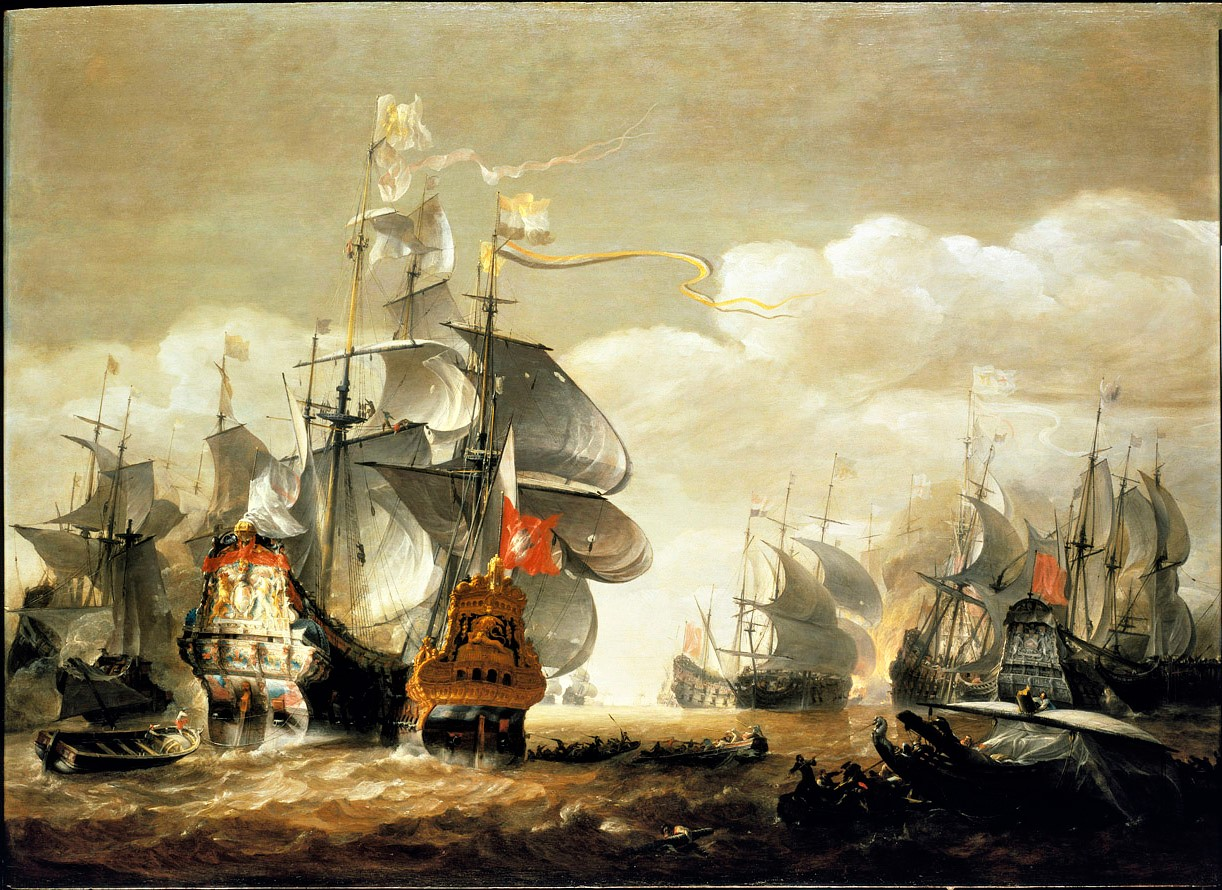
Battle of Lowestoft, 3 June 1665, showing HMS Royal Charles and the Eendracht by Hendrik van Minderhout

The Battle of Lowestoft was the first large naval action in the Second Anglo-Dutch War. In this battle on 3 June 1665 (old style) the Royal Charles was the flagship of James, Duke of York, the future King James II of England. Sir William Penn, who was also on the Royal Charles, was captain of the fleet. The Royal Charles was engaged with the Dutch flagship, the Eendracht when the latter was blown up. The Dutch fled in confusion. Sir William Penn, who was sick and exhausted, and the Duke of York both retired to their cabins. The Royal Charles was leading the pursuit under Harman's command when Henry Brouncker, the duke's gentleman-in-waiting, asked Harman to shorten sail. Brounker gave as his reason the danger to the duke if the Royal Charles, which was the closest of the English ships to the Dutch, were to find itself alone in an engagement with the Dutch on the coast of Holland. Harman said he could do nothing without orders. Brounker went back to the cabin, then returned to Harman and said the duke ordered him to shorten sail, which Harman did. The other pursuing ships slowed in response and the Dutch escaped. The incident caused a scandal and a parliamentary inquiry was held in which Harman was absolved of all blame, which was laid on Brouncker.

On 13 June 1665 Harman was knighted and promoted to rear admiral of the White squadron with the Resolution (formerly Tredagh) as his flagship. On 25 October 1665 Harman took command of the recently refitted frigate Revenge, with 58 guns and a crew of 300. In November he was sent with 18 ships to escort the merchant fleet home from Gothenburg. After his return he moved his flag to the 80-gun Henry. He fought in the Four Days' Battle (1–4 June 1666). The English fleet was commanded in this long battle against the Dutch by George Monck, 1st Duke of Albemarle. The fighting was savage. The admiral Sir George Ayscue was captured and the vice-admiral Sir William Berkeley was killed. The White squadron suffered the greatest damage. Harman led the van of the English fleet and was soon in the center of the Zeeland squadron, where his ship became completely disabled.

An enemy fire ship grappled the Henry on the starboard side, but through extraordinary exertion his boatswain managed to detach the grappling irons. A second fire ship grappled the Henry on the larboard side, and the sails caught fire. Almost fifty of the crew jumped overboard. Sir John drew his sword and threatened to kill any other men who tried to leave the ship or who failed to fight the fire. The remaining crew managed to quench the fire, but the burnt rigging let one of the top-sail yards fall and it broke Harman's leg. A third fire ship now approached but was sunk by fire from the Henry's lower-deck guns. The Dutch vice-admiral Evertzen approached and offered to accept a surrender. Harman refused and fired a broadside that killed Evertzen. The Dutch now held back from the Henry, which despite the damage it had suffered was able to sail back to Harwich. Harman managed to make enough repairs to put to sea again the next day, hoping to resume the fight despite his broken leg. He found that the engagement had been broken off.

=== St. James's Day Battle ===
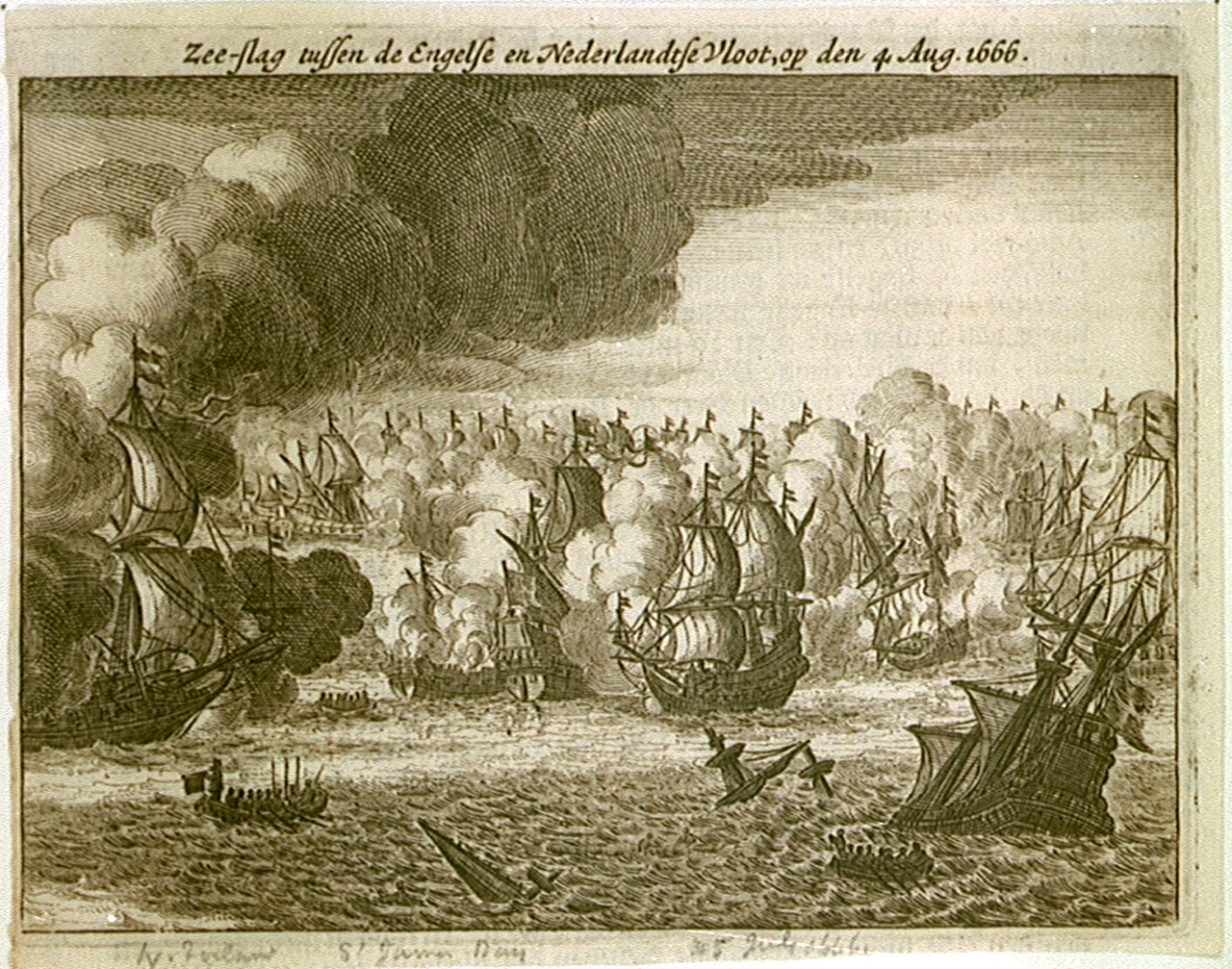
St. James Day Battle

With the Henry as his flagship Harman played a conspicuous part in the St. James's Day Battle on 4–5 August 1666 off the North Foreland of the coast of Kent.

=== West Indies (1667) ===
Harman had to resign his command while he recovered from his injury. Early in 1667 he was sent as admiral and commander in chief of a fleet that was sent to the West Indies. By special order his ship flew the Union Jack. He reached Barbados in early June and on 10 June 1667 sailed for Saint Kitts, which the French had just captured. He failed to recapture the island, and was holding a council of war when news arrived that 23–24 French warships and 3 fire ships were lying at Martinique. Harman directed his fleet to Martinique, where he found the French ships lying close to the shore under the protection of the batteries.

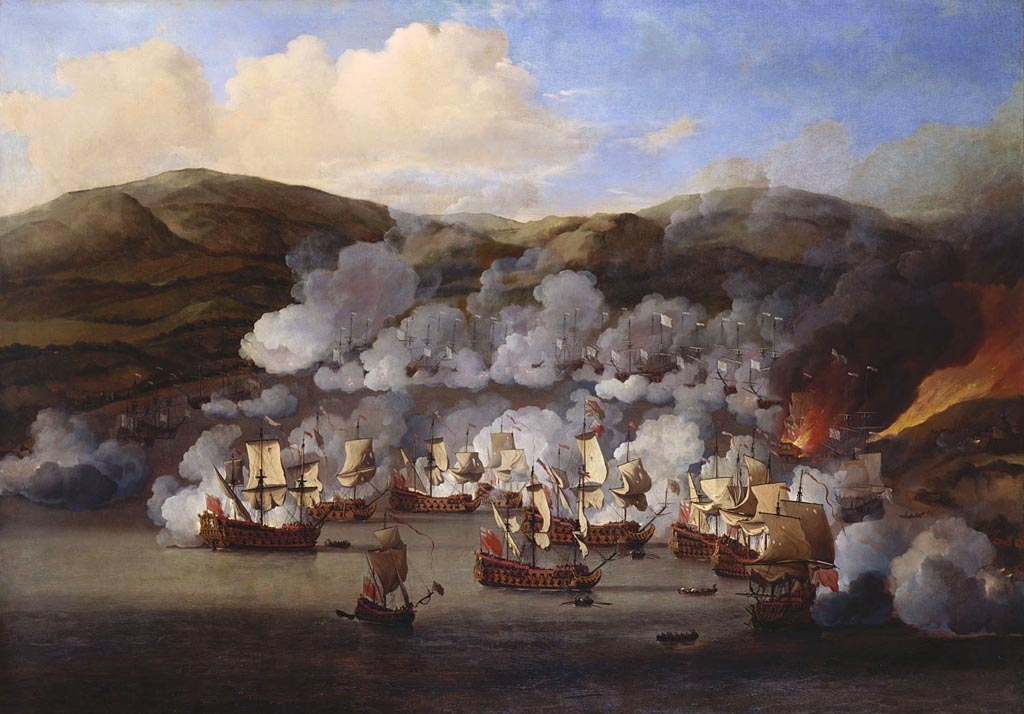
Attack on the French at Martinique by Willem van de Velde the Younger (1675)

The French commander Antoine Lefèbvre de La Barre and the governor of Martinique Robert de Clodoré had returned there after an attempt to take Nevis had failed when La Barre left the scene. La Barre and Clodoré were arguing when Harman's fleet arrived and in the Battle of Martinique bombarded the French ships off Saint-Pierre. Harman was suffering badly from gout and had difficulty moving, but despite this gave orders throughout the engagement. He attacked several times, and on 25 June 1667 set fire to the French admiral's ship and six or seven other strong vessels. La Barre appears to have panicked and ordered his ships to be scuttled. Several others were sunk, some sank themselves and only two or three escaped. The English lost no more than 80 men killed, although others were wounded and the ships suffered considerable damage and loss of ammunition.

=== South America ===
Harman then sailed to South America, and on 15 September 1667 captured Cayenne. His fleet destroyed Fort Cépérou and the French colonial settlement of Cayenne. The French governor Cyprien Lefebvre de Lézy fled the colony on 23 September 1667. Harman arrived at the mouth of the Suriname River on 3 October 1667. The next morning he entered the river on the Bonaventure accompanied by the Assurance and Norwich, the Portsmouth and Roe ketches under lieutenant-general Henry Willoughby and a sloop. Willoughby sent a messenger demanding that the Dutch surrender. The troops were landed on 5 October and advanced to the fort, which was well-built with walls about 18 feet (5.5 m) high. On 8 October 1667 Harman captured Fort Zeelandia. Harman returned to Barbados on 10 November 1667, and since peace had been concluded he sailed for England, arriving in the Downs on 7 April 1668.

== Inter-war period (1668–72) ==
Harman served under Sir Thomas Allin in 1669–70 in the expedition to the Straits. In this expedition Allin was sent to punish the Barbary corsairs for violating the treaty between England and Algiers and plundering English merchantmen. He captured and destroyed a great many of their vessels before returning to England. In 1672 Harman was appointed rear-admiral of the Blue squadron under the immediate command of Edward Montagu, 1st Earl of Sandwich.

== Third Anglo-Dutch War (1672–74) ==
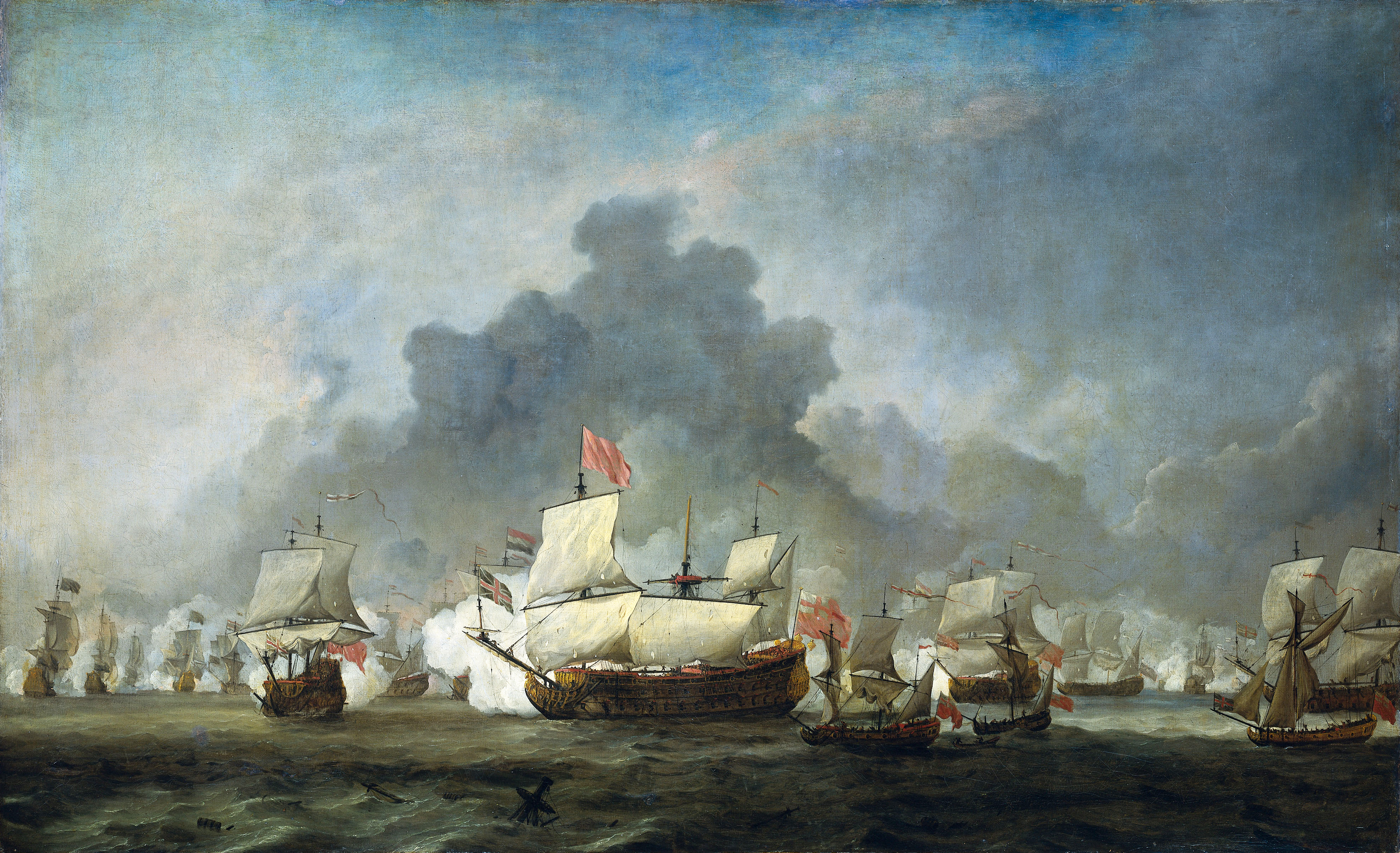
Battle of Solebay by Willem van de Velde the Younger

The first major engagement of the Third Anglo-Dutch War, in which the English were allies of the French, was the Battle of Solebay on 28 May 1672. Harman was a flag officer in Sandwich's squadron in this battle. The squadron took the brunt of the Dutch attack. The 40-gun frigate Dover, commanded by John Ernle, saved Harman and the Charles from a fire ship.

Harman was a flag officer in Prince Rupert's squadron in the Battle of Texel in 1673. In 1673 Harman was vice-admiral of the red squadron with the London as his flagship. He played a distinguished role in the second engagement with Michiel de Ruyter, despite being weak and sick. He was appointed admiral of the blue squadron when Sir Edward Spragge died, but he died himself on 11 October 1673 before taking up command. England and Holland concluded the war with the Treaty of Westminster of 19 February 1674.

The National Maritime Museum, Greenwich, London, has a three-quarter-length portrait of Harman by Peter Lely, part of the Flagmen of Lowestoft series of 13 portraits of senior ship's officers in the Battle of Lowestoft commissioned by James, Duke of York. Harman is turned away, looking back at the viewer over his left shoulder.

== Sources ==
- Admiral Sir John Harman, d. 1673, Flagmen of Lowestoft, Royal Museums Greenwich
- Campbell, John (1742), Lives of the admirals, and other eminent British seamen: containing their personal histories, and a detail of all their public services, Printed by John Applebee, for J. and H. Pemberton, ... and T. Waller
- Charnock, J. (1794), "HARMAN, Sir John", Biographia Navalis
- Chérubini, Bernard (1988), Cayenne, ville créole et polyethnique: essai d'anthropologie urbaine (in French), KARTHALA Editions, ISBN 978-2-86537-200-3
- Davies, J.G (2004). "Harman, Sir John (d.1673)". Oxford Dictionary of National Biography (online ed.). Oxford University Press. doi:10.1093/ref:odnb/12351. (Subscription, Wikipedia Library access or UK public library membership required.)
- Harlow, V.T. (15 May 2017). Colonising Expeditions to the West Indies and Guiana, 1623-1667. Taylor & Francis. ISBN 978-1-317-16410-4.
- "HMS Newbury (1654)", Newbury History
- La Roque, Robert. (2000), "Le Febvre de la Barre, Joseph-Antoine", Dictionary of Canadian Biography, vol. 1
- Laughton, John Knox (1885–1900), "Harman, John (d.1673)", Dictionary of National Biography, vol. 24
- Laughton, John Knox (1885–1900b), "Allin, Thomas", Dictionary of National Biography, vol. 1
- Plant, David (2010), "The Spanish Blockade: Cadiz and Santa Cruz", BCW Project
- Rickard, J. (11 December 2000), "First Anglo-Dutch War (1652-1654)", History of War
- Rickard, J. (12 December 2000b), "Second Anglo-Dutch War (1665-1667)", History of War
- Rickard, J. (12 December 2000c), "Third Anglo-Dutch War (1672-1674)", History of War
- Sir John Harman (1625?-1673), NPG: National Portrait Gallery
- Stewart, William (28 September 2009), "Harman, Sir John (d. 1673) (Britain)", Admirals of the World: A Biographical Dictionary, 1500 to the Present, McFarland, ISBN 978-0-7864-3809-9
