= Battle of Martinique =

Battle of Martinique or Invasion of Martinique refer to a number of military operations that took place on or near the French island of Martinique in Caribbean Sea:

- Battle of Martinique (1667), also known as "Harman's Martinican Bonfire", a battle between a British naval squadron under Sir John Harman, and a French merchant fleet (mostly ships of the French West India Company) destroyed at Fort Royal, Martinique
- Invasion of Martinique (1674), an unsuccessful Dutch invasion of the island during the Franco-Dutch War
- Invasion of Martinique (1759), an unsuccessful British invasion of the island during the Seven Years' War
- Invasion of Martinique (1762), a successful British invasion of the island during the Seven Years' War
- Battle of Martinique (1779), a naval action between British and French fleets during the American War of Independence resulting in a British victory
- Battle of Martinique (1780), an inconclusive naval action between British and French fleets during the American War of Independence
- Battle of Fort Royal, an engagement between British and French fleets off Martinique on 29 April 1781
- Battle of Martinique (1794), a successful British invasion of the island during the French Revolutionary Wars
- Invasion of Martinique (1809), a successful British invasion of the island during the Napoleonic Wars
