= Marquess of Baides =

Spanish nobility title

The title Marquess of Baides (Spanish: Marqués de Baides) is a 17th-century Spanish hereditary title bestowed upon Francisco López de Zúñiga on 20 September 1621 by King Philip IV of Spain.

The López de Zúñiga (or Zúñiga) family were Lords of Baides, in the province of Guadalajara, Castile-La Mancha, Spain. There Diego López de Zúñiga, established in 1428 a primogeniture (Spanish: Mayorazgo) over the estate and the surrounding lands. One of his descendants, Francisco López de Zúñiga y de la Cerda, Lord of Baides, was granted the elevation of his title to Marquess in the nobility of Castille by King Philip IV, on 20 September 1621.

Don Francisco López de Zúñiga y Meneses, the second Marquess, was Royal Governor of Chile between 1639 and 1646. He was accused of allowing corruption to flourish, to let his position go unattended and of using it to enrich himself. He died fighting against the English on his return to Spain.

== Marquesses of Baides ==
- Francisco López de Zúñiga, 1st Marquess of Baides (1621–1636)
- Francisco López de Zúñiga, 2nd Marquess of Baides
- Francisco López de Zúñiga, 3rd Marquess of Baides
- Francisco de Zúñiga, 5th Marquis of Baides
- María Luisa de Zúñiga Dávila Salazar y Córdoba, 6th Marchioness of Baides (?–1728)

== Sources ==
- Genealogical chart of family (in Spanish)
- Genealogical chart of family (in Spanish)
