= Martín de Mujica y Buitrón =

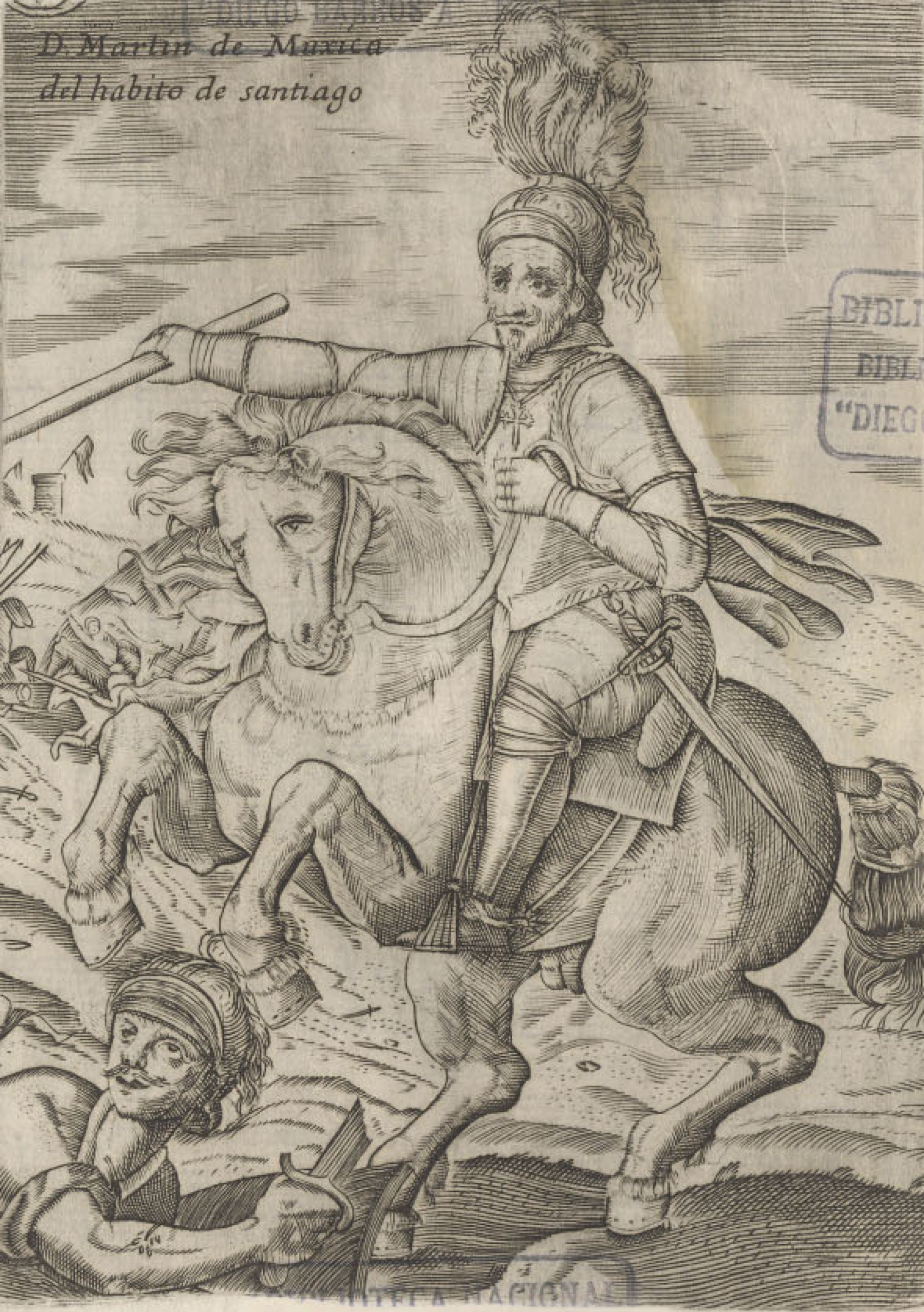

Martin de Mujica y Buitrón, (also known as Martin de Mogica or Muxica) was a Spanish Basque military man who was named by king Philip IV of Spain, to be Captain General and Royal Governor of Chile, besides president of its Real Audiencia. His government was from May 1646 and April 1649, when he died, apparently poisoned. Frequently described as an honest administrator. He looked for peace with the mapuches, celebrating the Parliament of Quilín (1647).

Government offices
Preceded by Francisco López de Zúñiga	Royal Governor of Chile; 1646–1649	Succeeded by Alonso de Figueroa
