= Recapture of Fort Zeelandia (1667) =

Coordinates: 5.8252°N 55.149872°W

- Part of the Second Anglo-Dutch War
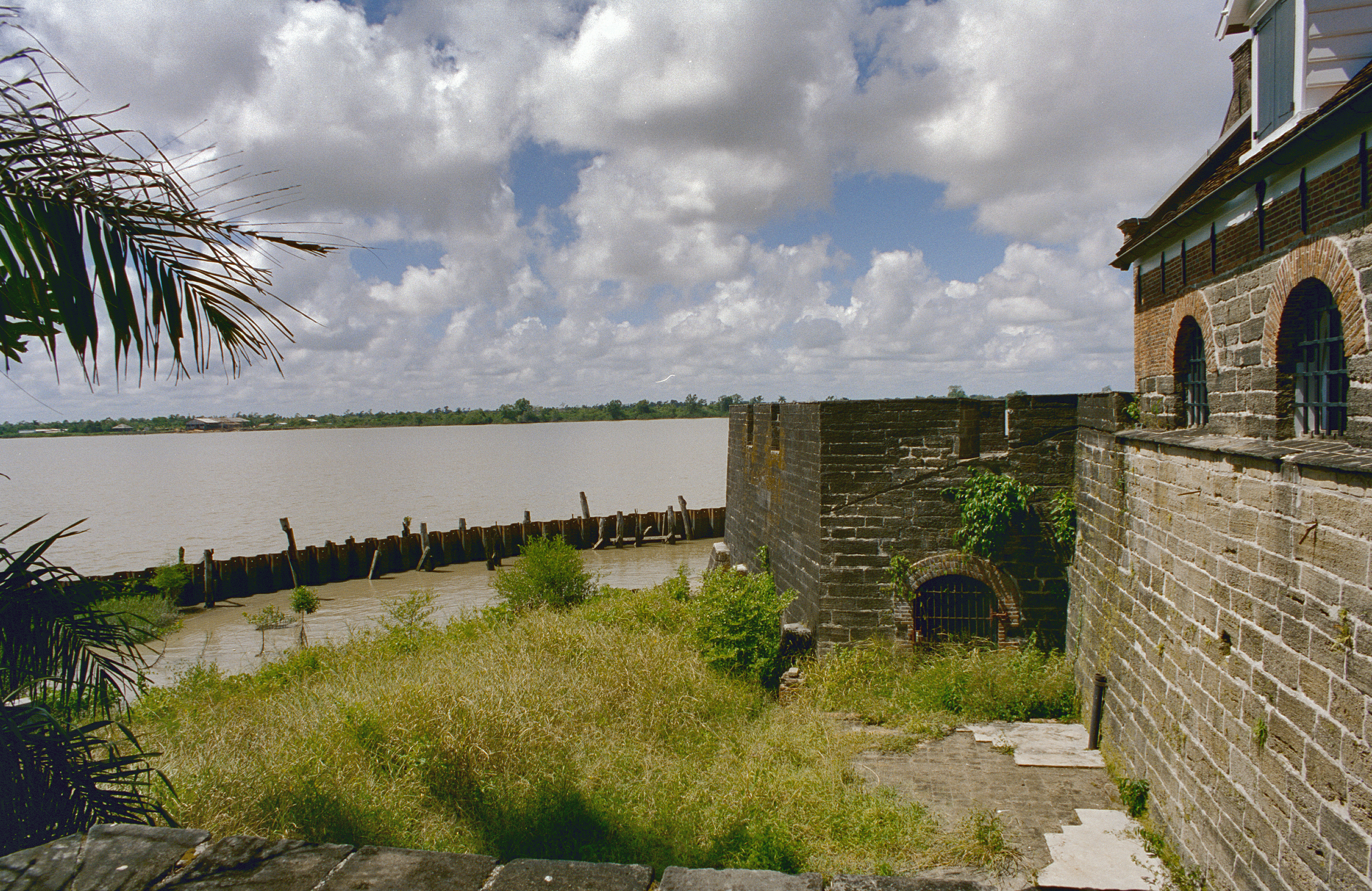
- Fort Zeelandia in 1997
Date	13 October, 1667
Location	Fort Zeelandia (present day Paramaribo) Suriname
Result	English victory

Belligerents
Dutch Republic	England

Commanders and leaders
(Dutch Republic) Maurits de Rame	(England) Rear Admiral John Harman

Strength
300 men	9 ships 800 sailors and troops

Casualties and losses
50 casualties 250 captured All stores captured	Light

The Recapture of Fort Zeelandia or the Seizure of Fort Zeelandia was a minor military action on 13 October, 1667 at the end of the Second Anglo-Dutch War in which an English force under command of Rear Admiral Sir John Harman assaulted and took by force the Dutch settlement and fortress of Zeelandia (present day Paramaribo) under Maurits de Rame. The English occupied the area but only for a short while as news of the peace of Breda arrived. The Dutch had captured the Zeelandia earlier in the year, and the English recapture was the last battle before the war's end between England and the Dutch Republic.

== Background ==
Fort Zeelandia had first been captured by the English in 1651 during the opening shots of the First Anglo-Dutch War and had held it until Captain Abraham Crijnssen recaptured Fort Zeelandia on 6 May, 1667 in a time when the French and Dutch had total domination of the Caribbean. This changed however when Harman inflicted a heavy defeat on the French at Martinique and Crijnssen had left the Caribbean to raid the Virginia colony after which as a result the English now had complete domination of the Caribbean seas.

Harman now set forth to take advantage and attempted to capture the French and Dutch settlements in South America. After his victory at Martinique Harman refitted and resupplied at Barbados after which he ventured South then headed West along the South American coast. He captured and sacked French Cayenne which he held for two weeks before heading further West to the Dutch settlement at fort of Zeelandia.

== Engagement ==
Harman now appeared before Fort Zeelandia on the 13 October which is dominated by a heavily defended fort. Seeing that a direct assault would be unwise Harman disembarked his troops a half mile below the Fort. The English then surrounded the fort and called upon its 250-man garrison under Maurits de Rame to surrender by nightfall. The Dutch however refuse knowing that their position is well defended and supplied.

Harman after a four-day lull occasioned by a lack of winds soon lost patience and on 17 October the English launched a combined land and sea assault after a heavy bombardment. After heavy fighting in which Captain Thomas Willoughby of the ketch Portsmouth was killed as well as many others and the Dutch with fifty casualties, de Rame requested terms to Harman.

Whilst they were being finalized, some English soldiers stealthily swam around Zeelandia's defenses, and then soon swept over the fort walls; surprising the defenders and taking the fort. The English quickly sent reinforcements with row boats filled with soldiers and secured the fort, turning the recently captured guns on the Dutch outside who then see their position as untenable. De Rame then has no choice but to surrender the whole settlement.

== Aftermath ==
Casualties were the same on both sides with around fifty killed or wounded; the imprisoned Dutch were released after being shipped to St Eustatius under terms by Harman. The English then occupied Zeelandia renaming it Fort Willoughby after the English Caribbean governor Henry Willoughby who then takes formal control of the settlement. By this stage the war had already ended but news of the capture came just too late for the treaty of Breda.

News arrived two weeks later from the Netherlands to announce that the colony was to be restored to the Dutch Republic according to the Treaty. Governor Willoughby refused to comply so instead decided to destroy its fortifications and turned the settlement over to the sack. Harman meanwhile reentered Barbados by 20 November, in anticipation of returning to England.
