= Francisco López de Zúñiga, 2nd Marquess of Baides =

Spanish Army officer and colonial administrator (1599–1655)

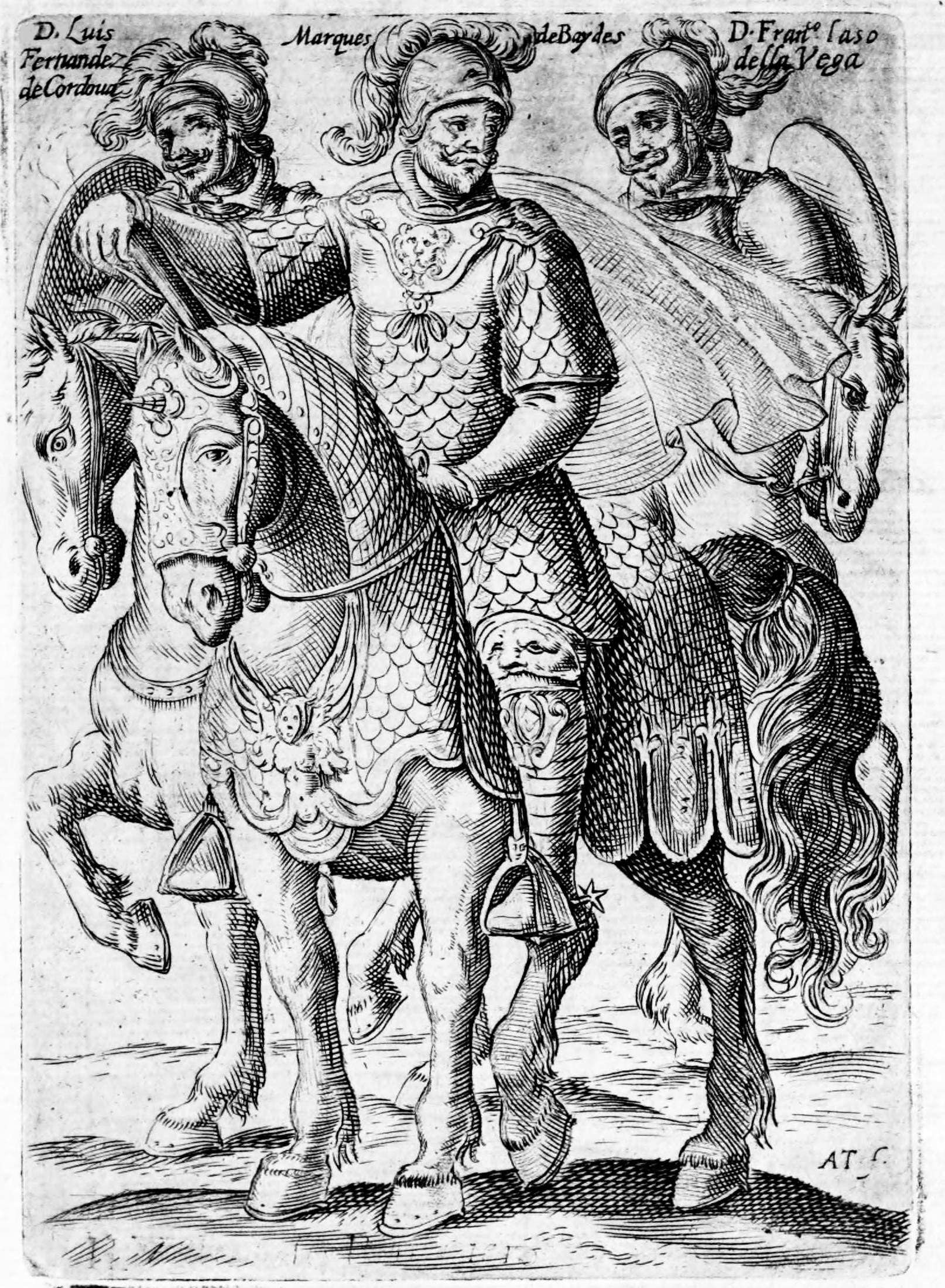
Portrait of Francisco (center)

Francisco López de Zúñiga y Meneses, 2nd Marquess of Baides and Count of Pedrosa (1599 – 9 September 1655) was a Spanish Army officer and colonial administrator who served as Royal Governor of Chile from May 1639 to May 1646. The son of Francisco López de Zúñiga y de la Cerda and María Meneses y Padilla. López de Zúñiga was a knight of the Order of Santiago and Count of Pedrosa. He was married to María de Salazar in 1636.

For 16 years, he served in the Spanish army, fighting in Flanders and Germany. In 1639, he was named Governor of the Captaincy General of Chile. During his rule, corruption flourished. However, he liked the Jesuits and admired Fr. Luis de Valdivia, and he brought gifts to make a new agreement with the natives. In 1641, he held the Parliament of Quillin, in the Quillin River valley, with the toqui Lincopinchon and established the first peace in the Arauco War with the indigenous Mapuche people. Nevertheless, a year later the Spaniards began using the military to put down uprisings.

At the end of his term, he embarked on a Spanish armada departing from Callao, Peru on its way back to Spain. Although he lived to see his son born during the voyage, the fleet was attacked by an English squadron while within sight of Cádiz, Spain, and López de Zúñiga was killed in the ensuing battle, as was his wife and one of his daughters.

== Sources ==
- Cordoba y Figueroa, Pedro de (1862). "Libro Sesto, XIII & XIV". Historia de Chile (1492-1717). Coleccion de historiadores de Chile (in Spanish). Vol. II (Instituto Chileno de Cultura Hispánica, Academia Chilena de la Historia ed.). Santiago, Chile: Imprenta del Ferrocarril.
- Eyzaguirre, José Ignacio Víctor (1850). Historia eclesiastica: Politica y literaria de Chile (in Spanish). Valparaíso, Chile: Imprenta del Comercio. pp. 205–206.
- Medina, José Toribio (1906). Diccionario Biográfico Colonial de Chile (PDF) (in Spanish). Santiago, Chile: Imprenta Elzeviriana. pp. 477–478.

Government offices
Preceded by Francisco Laso de la Vega	Royal Governor of Chile; 1639–1646	Succeeded by Martín de Mujica
Spanish nobility
Preceded by Francisco López de Zúñiga	Marquess of Baides; 1636–1655	Succeeded by Francisco López de Zúñiga
