= Capture of Cayenne (1667) =

- Part of the Second Anglo-Dutch War
Date	22 September 1667.
Location	Cayenne
Result	English victory

Belligerents
France	England

Commanders and leaders
(Kingdom of France) Governor Lefebvre de Lézy	(England) Rear Admiral John Harman

Strength
300 soldiers & militia	9 ships 800 sailors and troops

Casualties and losses
200 killed, wounded or captured All stores captured or burnt	Light

The Capture of Cayenne was a minor military event on the 22 September 1667 during the final stages of the Second Anglo-Dutch War. The French settlement of Cayenne under the French Governor Cyprien Lefebvre de Lézy was captured in an assault by English sailors and troops of Rear Admiral Sir John Harman's squadron. The English then occupied the settlement stripping it of anything of value before departing two weeks later.

Following its victory at Martinique, Rear Admiral Harman's fleet was in a dominant position in Caribbean Sea. Seeing that an attempt to retake French held St. Kitts was beyond his venture, Harman decided to attack the French and Dutch settlements that lay on the north coast of South America. The Dutch had recently recaptured the fort of Zeelandia from the English; now Harman intended to strike back there but first targeted the French settlement of Cayenne.

On the coast of South America heading towards Cayenne, Admiral Harman apparently was still unaware of the peace in Europe between England and Holland. On 22 September 1667 de Lézy observed vessels approaching and at first thought they were reinforcements sent from Martinique. When they circled round and approached Fort Saint Louis at Cayenne however he learned that these ships were actually English warships out of Barbados under Read Admiral Harman. He was pursuing a lone French supply frigate with the intention of disembarking 850 troops. Alarmed at this De Lezy led a total of 300 men at Remire then watched fourteen boatloads of English invaders gathered off shore.

Although surprise had gone Harman decided to attack without hesitation, while de Lézy was not prepared to resist a large force he decided to fight hoping that a relief force would come. The fort was taken and the French garrison was dispersed in a total of three days fighting, with the English completely surrounding the settlement. Most of the French were captured including De Lezy, however forty Frenchman managed to hide. Harman's men stripped the citadel of Saint Louis and surrounding district of everything of value. Then with the booty aboard the English torched the buildings and plantations leaving everything wasted. After loading their squadron with captured guns, ammunition, an unknown number of slaves and other booty the English departed on 9 October after two weeks of occupation. Harman sailed East and then struck at the Dutch settlement at Fort Zeelandia before news of the Peace of Breda arrived to bring the war to a conclusion. De Lezy and the French prisoners were released, and along with reinforcements strengthened the defenses, this time however it was attacked and captured by the Dutch nine years later.

== See also ==
Portuguese conquest of French Guiana
