= English ship Tredagh =

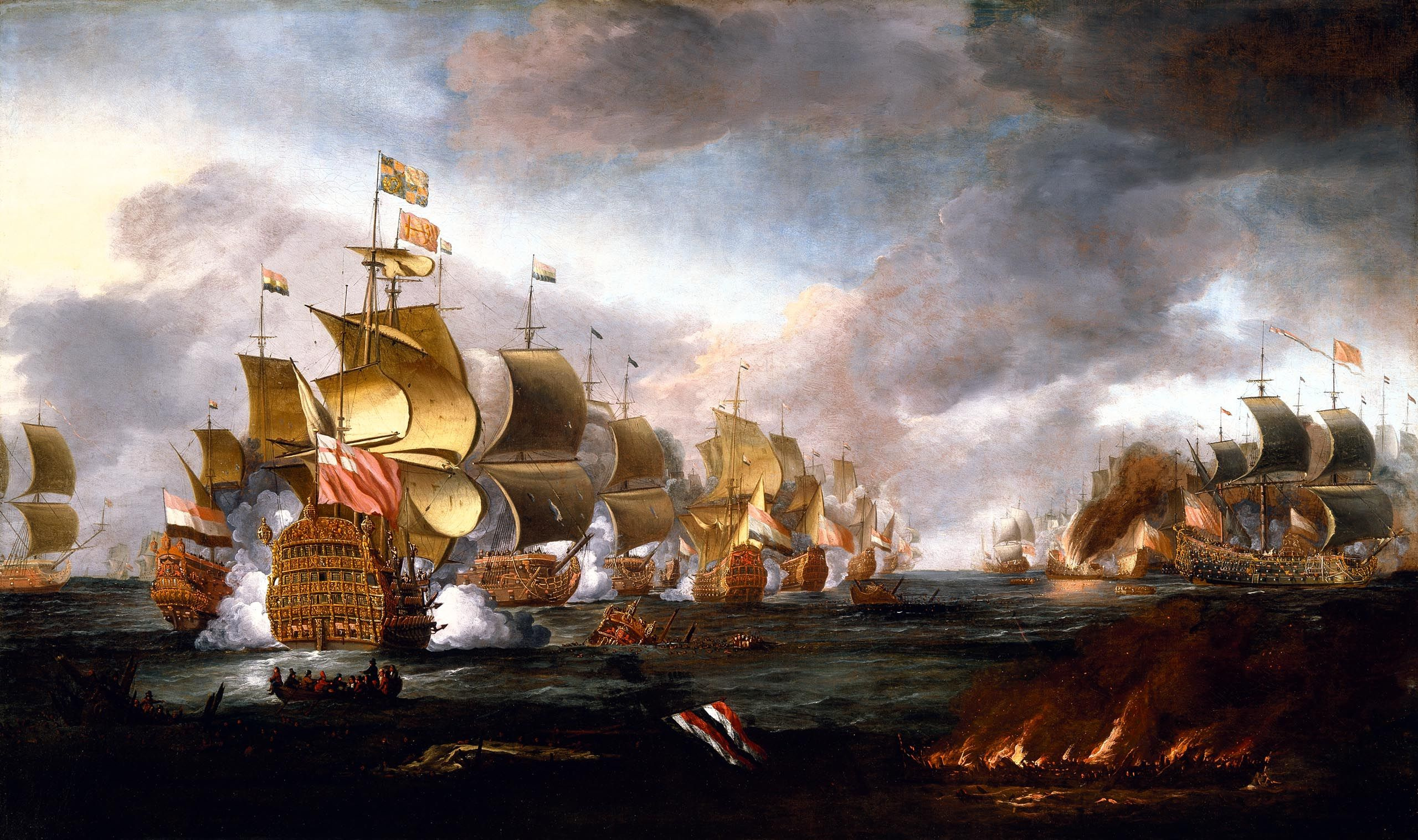
- The Battle of Lowestoft, 1665

History

England
- Name: Tredagh
- Namesake: Siege of Drogheda
- Ordered: December 1652
- Builder: Phineas Pett II, Ratcliffe
- Launched: 22 May 1654
- Renamed: HMS Resolution, 1660
- Fate: Burnt, 25 July 1666
- Notes: Participated in: Battle of Lowestoft; St. James's Day Battle

General characteristics
- Class & type: Third-rate frigate
- Tons burthen: 77127/94 bm
- Length: 117 ft 3 in (35.7 m) (keel)
- Beam: 35 ft 2 in (10.7 m)
- Depth of hold: 14 ft 5 in (4.4 m)
- Sail plan: Full-rigged ship
- Complement: 210 in 1660; 290 in 1666
- Armament: 52 guns of various weights of shot, later raised to 58

The Tredagh was a 52-gun third-rate frigate built under the Late 1652 Programme for the navy of the Commonwealth of England by Sir Phineas Pett at Ratcliffe, and launched on 22 May 1654 under the name Tredagh (Tredagh is an alternative name for the Irish town of Drogheda, scene of the Siege of Drogheda, a Roundhead victory, during the English Civil War).

After the Restoration in 1660, the Tredagh was taken into the new Royal Navy, and was renamed HMS Resolution (the existing English First rate Resolution - originally built as the Prince Royal - was renamed HMS Royal Prince at the same time). By 1665 her ordnance had been increased to 58 guns, comprising 20 demi-cannon and 4 culverins on the lower deck, 26 12-pounders on the upper deck, and 8 demi-culverins on the quarterdeck.

On 25 February 1665 (Julian calendar, then still in use; 7 March 1666 in the Gregorian calendar) Resolution fought in the Battle of Lowestoft as the flagship of Rear Admiral Robert Sansum (who was killed). On 25 July 1666 Julian (4 August 1666 Gregorian) she fought in the St. James's Day Battle under the command of Captain Willoughby Hannam as the flagship of Rear Admiral Sir John Harman. In the battle she was set on fire by a Dutch fireship and later exploded, with some 200 men drowned.
