= Richard Stayner =

English naval officer (1625–1662)

Sir Richard Stayner
- Born: 1625; Dorset, England
- Died: 2 July 1662 (aged 36–37); Lisbon, Spain
- Resting place: Spithead Hampshire England
- Occupation: Vice Admiral
- Years active: 1653–1661
- Spouse: Elizabeth Stayner
- Children: 2

Vice-Admiral Sir Richard Stayner (1625–1662) was an English naval officer who supported the Parliamentary cause during the English Civil War and the Interregnum. During the First Anglo-Dutch War he commanded the Foresight in actions at Portland (February 1653), the Gabbard (June 1653) and in the Battle of Scheveningen (29–31 July 1653). During the Anglo-Spanish War (1654–1660), he won renown and a fortune in prize money when he captured a great part of the Spanish West Indian treasure fleet off Cádiz in 1656. He was knighted by the Lord Protector Oliver Cromwell for services in Admiral Robert Blake's destruction of Spanish ships at Santa Cruz, 1657. He was a rear-admiral of the fleet which brought Charles II to England in 1660. He was again knighted at the Restoration. He died at Lisbon, while serving as vice-admiral of the Mediterranean fleet.

== Biography ==
Richard Stayner was one of several children of Roger Stayner of Tarrant Gunville, Dorset.

In his youth served in the Newfoundland fisheries trade. He joined the Parliamentary navy and served in a subordinate rank during the Civil War. On 22 June 1649 he was appointed commander of the Elizabeth prize, "now a State's ship", though a very small one, her principal armament being two sakers (that is, six-pounders). She was specially fitted out "for surprising small pickaroons that lurk among the sands" on the Essex coast, and for convoy service in the North Sea.

In August he captured the Robert, a small frigate, apparently one of Prince Rupert's vessels, for which and other good services he was awarded £20 and £5 for a gold medal. In November 1652 he commanded the Mermaid, fitting out at Chatham; but seems to have been moved from her in January to command the Foresight, which was one of the fleet with Blake in the battle off Portland on 28 February 1652/3 (in other words, 18 February 1652 Julian or 28 February 1653 Gregorian calendar). He was certainly with the fleet in the following April, when he signed the declaration of the sea-officers on the dissolution of the Rump Parliament by Oliver Cromwell, which was, in fact, a resolution "not to meddle with state affairs, but to keep foreigners from fooling us".

In the battle off the Gabbard on 2–3 June 1653, Stayner commanded the Foresight in the white squadron under the immediate command of William Penn, and was afterwards sent into the river in convoy of twelve disabled ships, eleven Dutch prizes, with 1,350 prisoners, and the body of Admiral Richard Deane, which he was ordered to take to Woolwich.

Stayner rejoined the fleet in time to take part in the decisive battle of Scheveningen (29–31 July), and continued with it until the end of the season. In December he was strongly recommended by George Monck for a larger ship, and in the following January was appointed to the Plymouth, in which during the spring, until the end of the First Anglo-Dutch War, he was employed in active cruising in the North Sea, during which he made several captures, including one rich East Indiaman of eight hundred tons, having on board four chests of silver.

In July he was appointed by Blake to the Catherine, and in September sailed for the Mediterranean with Blake, returning to England with him in October 1655. In the following February he was in command of the Bridgwater and sailed again with Blake for Cádiz, which was kept closely blockaded.

In September, when the sea-generals with the greater part of the fleet went to Aveiro, Stayner, then in the Speaker, was left off Cádiz in command of a small squadron of some six or seven ships.

On 8 September he fell in with the Spanish treasure fleet which, having information from a prize that the English had left the coast, was pushing on for Cádiz in such perfect confidence that, it is said, the Spaniards supposed Stayner's ships to be fishing-vessels; yet three of Stayner's ships at least, the Speaker, Bridgwater, and Plymouth, were each of more than nine hundred tons. Nothing could be done that night, and the next morning several of Stayner's ships had fallen to leeward. He had only three with him, but these were the powerful ships just named; and as they were now within twelve miles of Cádiz, he judged that delay was unwise, and attacked the Spaniards about nine o'clock in morning. Of the four capital ships in the Spanish fleet, one escaped and ran for Cádiz, but struck on a rock and went to the bottom. The three others were captured, but two of them caught fire and were burnt with all their cargo and a great part of their men. The fourth remained in the possession of the English; some of the other ships also were taken. The value of the prize to the captors was estimated at £600,000; but it was stated by the Spaniards that their loss was not less than nine million dollars, or nearly two millions sterling. The news of this tremendous blow reached England early in October. An official narrative of it was published on 4 October, and a thanksgiving service ordered to be held on the 8th in all the churches in London and Westminster.

Shortly after this Stayner returned to England with Edward Montagu (later Earl of Sandwich); but rejoined Blake early the next year, and took a brilliant part in the destruction of the Spanish ships at Santa Cruz on 20 April.

Having arranged the ships with the utmost care and judgement, and those ships being supported by a considerable number of forts and batteries on shore, the Spaniards thought themselves so perfectly secure, in case of an attack, that their admiral sent Blake an open defiance. On reconnoitring the force and position of the enemy, the English admiral found it impossible to bring off the enemy's ships, though gallantry and prudence might render it possible to destroy them. Stayner was immediately detached to begin the attack, and being supported by Blake with the remainder of the fleet, the Spaniards were, in a very few hours, driven out of their ships and breast-works The former were instantly taken possession of by the English: and it being impossible to bring them off they were all set on fire and burnt to the water's edge.

The Royalist politician and historian Edward Hyde, Earl of Clarendon eulogised this action, writing:

The whole action, was so miraculous, that all men, who knew the place, wondered that any sober men, with what courage soever endowed, would ever have undertaken it; and they could hardly persuade themselves to believe what they had done! whilst the Spaniards comforted themselves with the belief, that they were devils, and not men, who had destroyed them in such manner.

For his conduct on this occasion he was knighted by the Lord Protector Cromwell on his return to England in the following August. During the rest of the year and during 1658 he commanded in the Downs, nominally as second to Montagu, who was most of the time in London, and really as commander-in-chief, with his flag as rear-admiral sometimes in Essex, sometimes in London, and towards the end of the time in Speaker. His work was entirely administrative, and he had no active share in the battles of Mardyke and Dunkirk, though he was in constant communication with Sir William Goodsonn, by whom they were entirely conducted. In the summer of 1659 he was rear-admiral of the fleet with Montagu in the Sound, and on 16 April 1660 was appointed by Montagu to be rear-admiral of the fleet which went over to bring King Charles II to England. For this service he was knighted on 24 September (his earlier knighthood, conferred by Cromwell, not being recognised by the Royalists).

In the early summer of 1661 Stayner was again commander-in-chief in the Downs, and in June sailed for Lisbon and the Mediterranean as rear-admiral of the fleet under Montagu now the Earl of Sandwich. When Sandwich took de facto possession of Tangier, it was Stayner who was put in command of the first shore battalion of seamen. Then, when Sandwich went to Lisbon to take Catherine of Braganza to London, Stayner, with his flag in the Mary, remained as vice-admiral of the fleet under Sir John Lawson. On 2 July it was reported from Lisbon that he had just arrived from Tangiers; on 20 July that he was dangerously ill; on 9 October that he had died—apparently a few days before. In pursuance of his wish to be buried beside his wife, who seems to have died in 1658, his body was embalmed and brought home in the Mary, which arrived at Spithead on 3 November.

== Family ==
Richard Stayner married Elizabeth (1635?–1662), daughter of Thomas Hebbe of Loughborough. They had two children, Richard and Elizabeth.

On 30 May 1663 Richard petitioned for repayment of £300 which his father had advanced for the king's service. The claim was approved by Sandwich, but there is no mention of the money having been paid.

== Sources ==
- Baumber, Michael (January 2008) [2004]. "Stayner, Sir Richard (1624/5–1662)". Oxford Dictionary of National Biography (online ed.). Oxford University Press. doi:10.1093/ref:odnb/26334. (Subscription, Wikipedia Library access or UK public library membership required.)

Attribution

- This article incorporates text from a publication now in the public domain: Laughton, Richard (1898). "Stayner, Richard". In Lee, Sidney (ed.). Dictionary of National Biography. Vol. 54. London: Smith, Elder & Co. pp. 122–123.
