= English ship Diamond (1652) =

Ship of the line of the Royal Navy

History

England
- Name: Diamond
- Ordered: June 1651
- Builder: Peter Pett, Deptford Dockyard
- Launched: 15 March 1652
- Captured: 20 September 1693, by the French

France
- Acquired: 1693
- Fate: Unknown

General characteristics
- Class & type: 40-gun fourth-rate frigate
- Length: 127 ft 6 in (38.9 m) (gundeck); 105 ft 6 in (32.2 m) (keel)
- Beam: 31 ft 3 in (9.5 m)
- Depth of hold: 15 ft 7.5 in (4.8 m)
- Sail plan: Full-rigged ship
- Armament: 40 guns (1660); 48 guns (1677)

Diamond was a 40-gun fourth-rate frigate of the English Royal Navy, originally built for the navy of the Commonwealth of England by Peter Pett at Deptford Dockyard, and launched on 15 March 1652. By 1677 her armament had been increased to 48 guns.

Diamond was captured by the French in 1693.
