= Battle of Martinique (1667) =

- Part of the Second Anglo-Dutch War
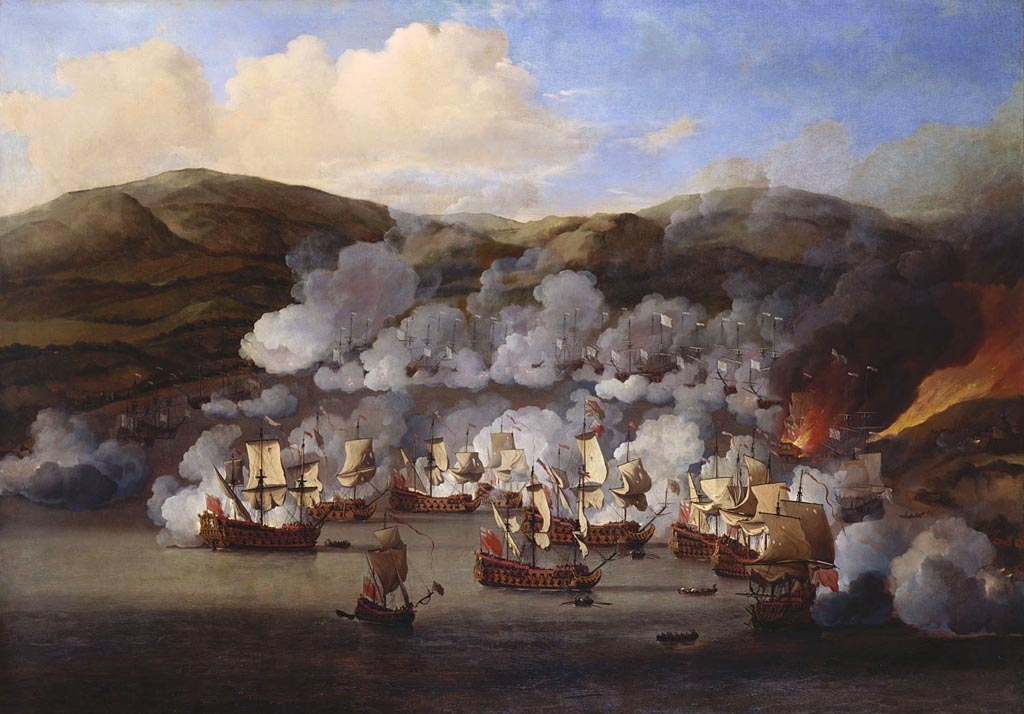
- 1675 painting of the battle
Date	30 June – 7 July 1667
Location	Off Saint-Pierre, Martinique 14.742°N 61.176°W
Result	English victory

Belligerents
France	England

Commanders and leaders
de La Barre; Robert de Clodoré	Sir John Harman

Strength
25 ships	11 ships 2 fireships

Casualties and losses
23 ships destroyed or captured 1,000 killed, wounded or captured	80 killed or wounded

The Battle of Martinique (Note: Also known as Harman's Martinican Bonfire) took place off the Caribbean island of Martinique from 30 June to 7 July 1667, towards the end of the Second Anglo-Dutch War. A French fleet commanded by de la Barre was virtually destroyed by a Royal Navy squadron under Sir John Harman. Victory meant the English restored their position in the region shortly before the Treaty of Breda ended the war on 31 July 1667.

== Background ==
From the second half of the 17th century onwards, Sugar plantations in the Caribbean were highly lucrative, and competed for by England, the Dutch Republic, and France among others. Even when the countries were theoretically at peace, the West Indies were often a source of conflict, and many colonies changed hands on a regular basis. Since they also provided access to the highly profitable trade with Spanish America, this theatre of the Second Anglo-Dutch War had important strategic and commercial value.

Shortly after fighting began in 1665, the English captured the Dutch colony of St Eustatius. When France entered the war as a Dutch ally in April 1666, ships led by local governor de la Barre captured the English possessions of St Kitts, Antigua and Montserrat. A Dutch naval expedition under Abraham Crijnssen retook St Eustatius, and in February 1667 captured Surinam, then an English colony. With much of the Caribbean under Franco-Dutch control, their combined fleet attacked Nevis on 20 May 1667, but were repulsed by Sir John Berry.

Following this failure, de la Barre returned to Martinique, while Crijnssen planned an assault on the English Colony of Virginia. In early June, the balance of power in the region was transformed with the arrival in Nevis of an English squadron. This consisted of seven warships, two ketches, and two fireships, under Sir John Harman, an experienced sailor who fought in the First Anglo-Dutch War, as well as Lowestoft in 1665, and the Four Days' Battle in 1666. Reinforced by the 50 gun Jersey and frigate Norwich, Harman left Nevis on 25 June, planning to retake St Kitts. (Note: The squadron contained the following vessels; Ship of the line; Lion (58 guns) flagship: Jersey (50): Crown (48): Newcastle (50): Dover (46): Bonaventure (48): Assistance (46): Assurance (38): Frigate Norwich (26); Fireships; Joseph and Prosperous; Ketches; Portsmouth (10) and Roe (8))

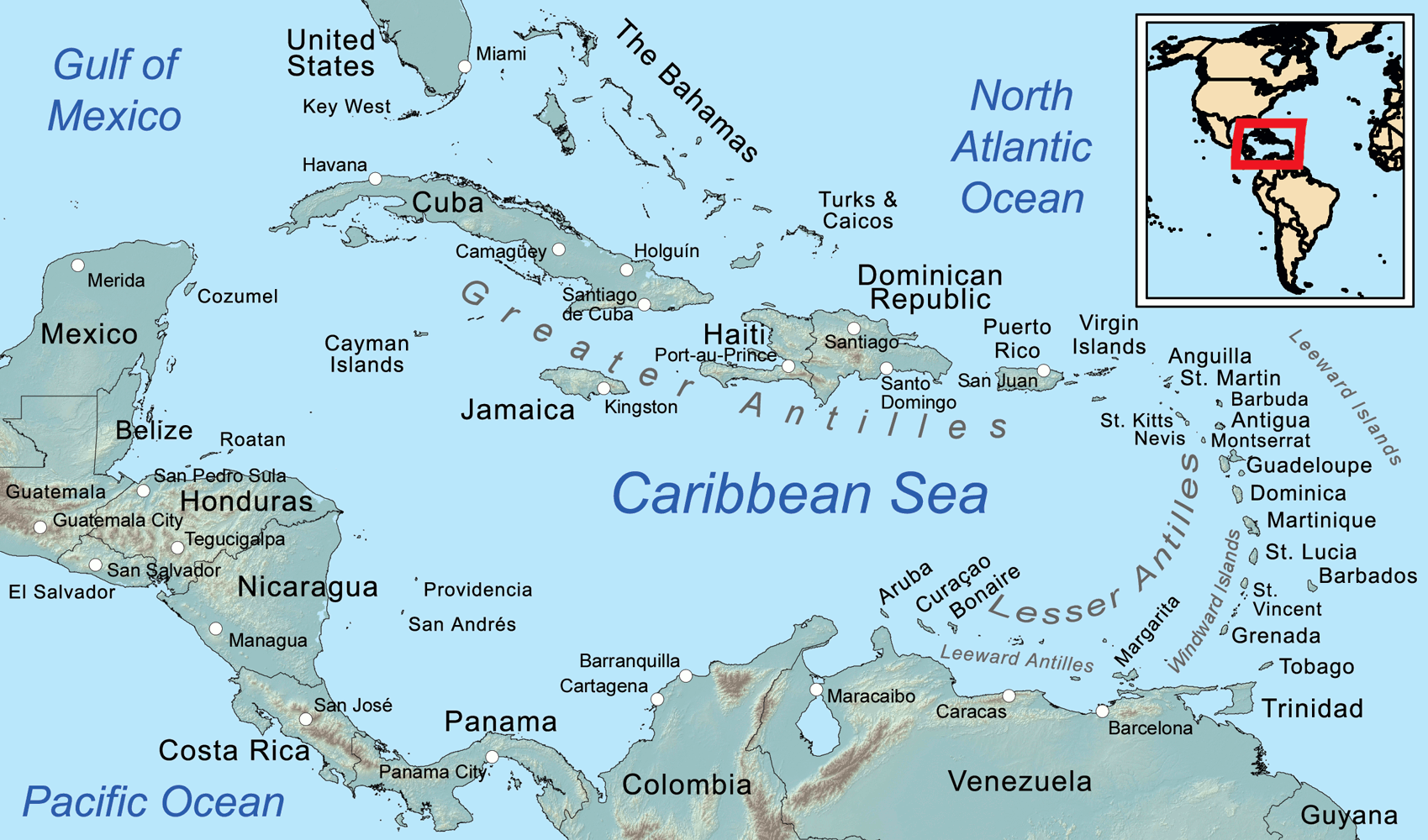
Map of the Caribbean

Although his attack on St Kitts failed, Harman then headed for Martinique after learning of de la Barre's presence. He arrived on 29 June to find nineteen French West India Company vessels and several local traders sheltering in the main bay. Although out gunned by their opponents, the French ships were protected by artillery based in Fort Saint Pierre, along with two smaller works, commanded by Governor Robert de Clodoré and Commodore de Loubière respectively.

== Battle: 30 June to 7 July ==
Harman's strategy was to force the French to use up their ammunition, since the blockade imposed by his ships meant they could not be resupplied. At 4:30 pm on 30 June, his squadron entered the bay and began firing on the French ships and batteries. Both sides suffered minor damage, before Harman withdrew an hour later. On the afternoon of 1 July, his flagship Lion and three other ships resumed the attack. After four hours of combat, the English vessels became becalmed and had to be towed out of range. Although Harman suffered some casualties and inflicted only moderate damage in this exchange, French ammunition stocks were beginning to run low.

On 2 July, the English resumed their assault, this time engaging in a three-hour exchange of fire before withdrawing, and inflicting heavy casualties. Having spent 3 July carrying out repairs, Harman launched another attack next day. This lasted for some two hours, forcing the defenders to expend much of their remaining ammunition. The English withdrew again with minor damage, then spent two days awaiting fresh supplies from Barbados.

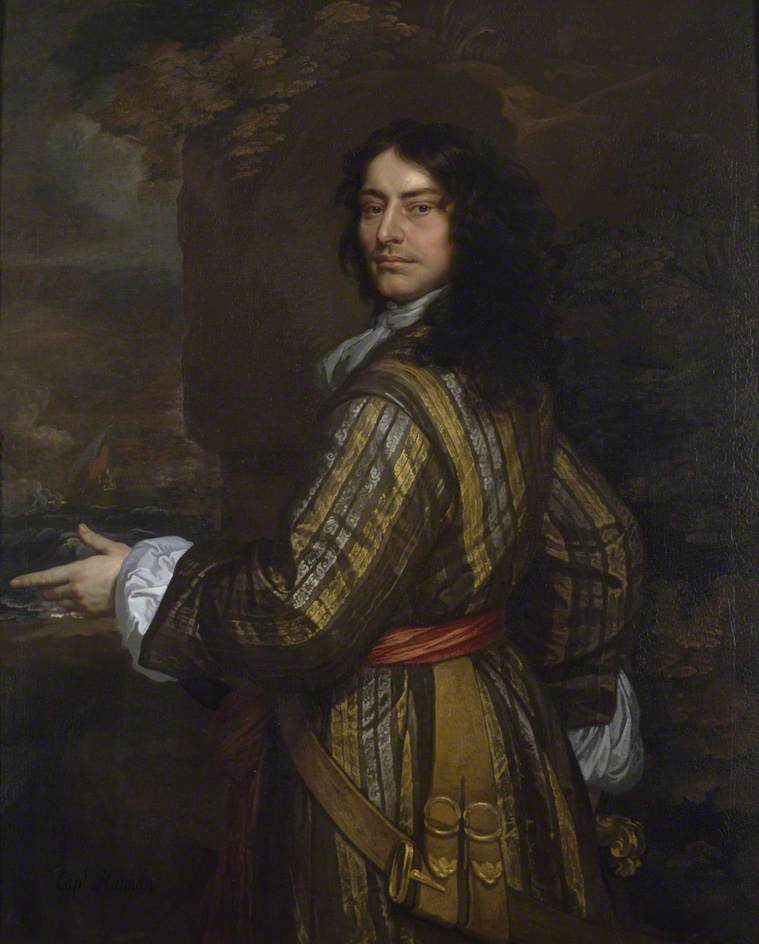
Sir John Harman by Peter Lely, who led the successful attack on Martinique

When Harman resumed the assault on 6 July, he noticed French resistance had seriously declined. A fireship was released, setting fire to de la Barre's flagship Lys Couronée, which then spread to the Saint Jean and Lion d’Or. All three were soon virtually destroyed, prompting panicked crews to abandon most of the other ships. A confused action now commenced, both sides being hindered by poor light and heavy smoke. After five hours, the English withdrew, while the French began scuttling their remaining vessels, fearing another attack.

Harman attacked for the final time on 7 July, this time concentrating fire on the three forts. Saint Pierre and Saint Robert were quickly destroyed, while Saint Sébastien held out longer before it too was abandoned by its garrison. His victory complete, Harman withdrew, with most of his ships nearly out of ammunition.

== Aftermath ==
Having achieved a substantial success, Harman left Martinique and returned to Nevis on 11 July. At the cost of eighty casualties, he had destroyed or captured most of the French fleet, with only two or three ships out of twenty-five recorded as having escaped. French losses were around 600 killed or wounded, plus another 400 captured. (Note: Samuel Pepys recorded the event in his diary as follows: ..and here do hear by Tom Killigrew and Mr. Progers that for certain news has come of Harman having spoilt 19 of 20 French ships somewhere about the Barbados I think but wherever it is, it is good service and very welcome)

Although the war officially ended on 31 July with the signing of the Treaty of Breda, this news did not officially reach Harman until early November. Using his ships to transport an army of 900 men, on 22 September he captured the French trading post of Cayenne, then retook Surinam on 13 October. While too late to have any significant impact on the result of the war, these successes forced Crinjeens to abandon his attack on Virginia, and return to the Caribbean. Under the terms of the peace treaty, Surinam became a Dutch colony, in exchange for confirming English possession of New Netherland. Cayenne was returned to France, England regained Montserrat and Antigua, while Saint Kitts was divided between the two countries.

== Sources ==
- Bradley, Peter T (2000). British Maritime Enterprise in the New World: From the Late 15th to the Mid-18th Century. Edwin Mellen Press Ltd. ISBN 978-0773478664.
- Burnard, T.G (2001). "'Prodigious Riches': The Wealth of Jamaica before the American Revolution". The Economic History Review. 54 (2): 506–524. doi:10.1111/1468-0289.00201. JSTOR 3091762.
- Clowes, William Laird (2003). The Royal Navy: A History - From the Earliest Times to 1900. Vol. 1. Chatham Publishing; New ed. ISBN 978-1861760104.
- Davenport, Frances; Paullin, Charles (1929). European treaties bearing on the history of the United States and its dependencies: Volume II. Carnegie Institution.
- Davies, J.G (2004). "Harman, Sir John (d.1673)". Oxford Dictionary of National Biography (online ed.). Oxford University Press. doi:10.1093/ref:odnb/12351. (Subscription, Wikipedia Library access or UK public library membership required.)
- Davies, J.G (2008). Pepys's Navy: Ships, Men & Warfare, 1649-1689. Seaforth Publishing. ISBN 978-1848320147.
- Fox, Frank L (2018). The Four Days' Battle of 1666: The Greatest Sea Fight in the Age of Sail. Seaforth Publishing. ISBN 978-1-5267-3727-4.
- Jaques, Tony (2006). Dictionary of Battles and Sieges: A Guide to 8,500 Battles from Antiquity through the Twenty-first Century. Greenwood. ISBN 978-0313335365.
- Marley, David (2008). Wars of the Americas: A Chronology of Armed Conflict in the Western Hemisphere. ISBN 978-1598841008.
