= HMS Panther (1703) =

Ship of the line of the Royal Navy

History

Great Britain
- Name: HMS Panther
- Ordered: 8 July 1702
- Builder: Popely, Deptford
- Launched: 15 March 1703
- Fate: Sold, 1768

General characteristics as built
- Class & type: 50-gun fourth rate ship of the line
- Tons burthen: 683 bm
- Length: 131 ft 3 1/2 in (40.0 m) (gundeck)
- Beam: 34 ft 4 in (10.5 m)
- Depth of hold: 13 ft 8 in (4.2 m)
- Propulsion: Sails
- Sail plan: Full-rigged ship
- Armament: 50 guns of various weights of shot

General characteristics after 1716 rebuild
- Class & type: 1706 Establishment 50-gun fourth rate ship of the line
- Tons burthen: 715 bm
- Length: 130 ft (39.6 m) (gundeck)
- Beam: 35 ft (10.7 m)
- Depth of hold: 14 ft (4.3 m)
- Propulsion: Sails
- Sail plan: Full-rigged ship
- Armament: 50 guns: Gundeck: 22 × 18-pdrs; Upper gundeck: 22 × 9-pdrs; Quarterdeck: 4 × 6-pdrs; Forecastle: 2 × 6-pdrs

HMS Panther was a 50-gun fourth rate ship of the line of the Royal Navy, built by contract by Francis Popely at his yard at Deptford and launched on 15 March 1703.

On 13 August 1704, under Captain Peregrine Bertie, she took part in the Battle of Malaga as part of Rooke's fleet. Over the winter of 1704-05, she was with Leake's squadron. In 1705 she was under the command of Captain Charles Smith, with Admiral Sir Cloudesley Shovell's fleet in the Mediterranean. In 1706 she was under the command of Captain Henry Hubbard, with Byng's squadron over the winter of 1706-07.

In 1707, she belonged to Admiral Sir Cloudesley Shovell's fleet. She saw action during the unsuccessful Battle of Toulon and was present during the great naval disaster off the Isles of Scilly when Shovell and four of his ships (Association, Eagle, Romney and Firebrand) were lost, claiming the lives of nearly 2,000 sailors. Panther suffered little to no damage and finally managed to reach Portsmouth.

Panther was rebuilt according to the 1706 Establishment at Woolwich Dockyard, and relaunched on 6 April 1716. She was hulked in 1743, remaining in that role until she was sold out of the navy in 1768.
