= HMS Somerset (1698) =

Ship of the line of the Royal Navy

History

Great Britain
- Name: HMS Somerset
- Builder: Lee, Chatham Dockyard
- Launched: 31 May 1698
- Honours and awards: Participated in: Battle of Vigo Bay; Battle of Vélez-Málaga
- Fate: Broken up, 1740

General characteristics
- Class & type: 80-gun third rate ship of the line
- Tons burthen: 1263 70/94 (bm)
- Length: 158 ft (48.2 m) (gundeck)
- Beam: 42 ft 9 in (13.0 m)
- Depth of hold: 17 ft 10 in (5.4 m)
- Propulsion: Sails
- Sail plan: Full-rigged ship
- Armament: 80 guns of various weights of shot

HMS Somerset was a three-decker 80-gun third rate ship of the line of the Royal Navy, launched at Chatham Dockyard on 31 May 1698. She was the first ship to bear the name.

She served as Admiral Sir George Rooke's flagship at the battle of Vigo Bay on 12 October 1702. A powerful fleet of Anglo-Dutch warships had been assembled under Admiral Rooke, as Commander-in-Chief, to attack and capture Cádiz. Some footholds were gained near the city but after six weeks of vacillation the allied fleet retired ignominiously on 18 September. Rooke was not prepared to return home empty handed. On his homeward journey he learned of a valuable Spanish treasure fleet that had anchored at Vigo Bay in north-west Spain. Rooke arrived to discover that the Marquis de Châteaurenault, the French admiral, had laid a boom defence of masts across the inner harbour, covered by guns from sea and land, and had positioned his largest men-of-war to cover it. Admiral Thomas Hopsonn, aboard his flagship, the 80-gun HMS Torbay, was ordered to break the boom while the Duke of Ormonde's troops assaulted the forts. The Anglo-Dutch fleet followed astern of Hopsonn, capturing every ship not already burnt by the French, along with considerable treasure. A total of thirty-four French and Spanish ships were captured, destroyed or driven ashore.

The battle of Vélez-Málaga on 13 August 1704 was the only fleet action fought at sea during the War of the Spanish Succession (1701–14), and it was inconclusive. Each fleet included fifty-one ships of the line and the action was fought in strict line order. The Anglo-Dutch commander-in-chief was once again Sir George Rooke, flying his flag in HMS Royal Katherine, while his Franco-Spanish opposite number was the Comte de Toulouse, in the 104-gun Foudrayant. Although the battle itself was indecisive and neither side lost a ship, the casualties were heavy, and it put an end to the Franco-Spanish attempt to capture Gibraltar.

In 1707, Somerset was part of Admiral Sir Cloudesley Shovell's fleet. She saw action during the Battle of Toulon and was present during the great naval disaster off the Isles of Scilly when Shovell and four of his ships (Association, Firebrand, Romney and Eagle) were lost, claiming the lives of nearly 2,000 sailors. Somerset suffered little to no damage and finally managed to reach Portsmouth.

Somerset was hulked in 1715 and was broken up at Woolwich in 1740.
