= HMS Swiftsure (1673) =

Ship of the line of the Royal Navy

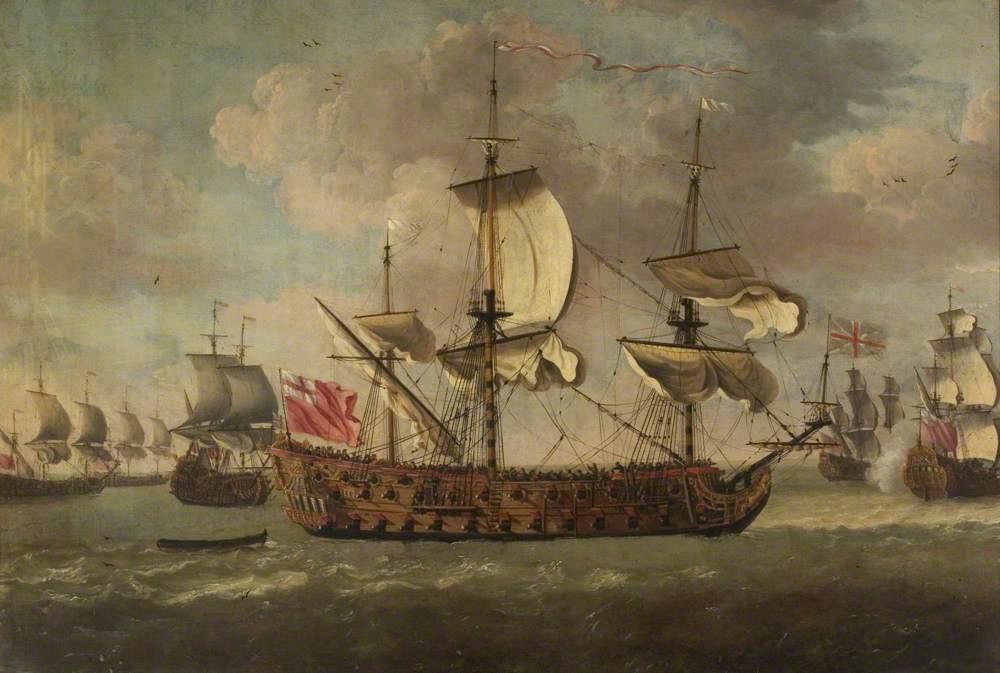
- Swiftsure, by Isaac Sailmaker

History

Great Britain
- Name: HMS Swiftsure
- Builder: Deane, Harwich
- Launched: 1673
- Renamed: HMS Revenge, 1718
- Fate: Sold, 1787
- Notes: Participated in: Battle of Barfleur; Battle of La Hogue

General characteristics as built
- Class & type: 70-gun third-rate ship of the line
- Tons burthen: 978 bm
- Length: 123 ft (37 m) (keel)
- Beam: 38 ft 8 in (11.79 m)
- Depth of hold: 15 ft 6 in (4.72 m)
- Sail plan: Full-rigged ship
- Armament: 70 guns of various weights of shot

General characteristics after 1696 rebuild
- Class & type: 66-gun third-rate ship of the line
- Tons burthen: 987 tons bm
- Length: 148 ft (45 m) (gundeck)
- Beam: 39 ft (12 m)
- Depth of hold: 14 ft (4.3 m)
- Sail plan: Full-rigged ship
- Armament: 66 guns of various weights of shot

General characteristics after 1718 rebuild
- Class & type: 1706 Establishment 70-gun third-rate ship of the line
- Tons burthen: 1104 tons bm
- Length: 150 ft (46 m) (gundeck)
- Beam: 41 ft (12 m)
- Depth of hold: 17 ft 4 in (5.28 m)
- Sail plan: Full-rigged ship
- Armament: 70 guns: Gundeck: 26 × 24 pdrs; Upper gundeck: 26 × 12 pdrs; Quarterdeck: 14 × 6 pdrs; Forecastle: 4 × 6 pdrs

General characteristics after 1742 rebuild
- Class & type: 1733 proposals 70-gun third-rate ship of the line
- Tons burthen: 1258 tons bm
- Length: 151 ft (46 m) (gundeck)
- Beam: 43 ft 5 in (13.23 m)
- Depth of hold: 17 ft 9 in (5.41 m)
- Sail plan: Full-rigged ship
- Armament: 70 guns: Gundeck: 26 × 24 pdrs; Upper gundeck: 26 × 12 pdrs; Quarterdeck: 14 × 6 pdrs; Forecastle: 4 × 6 pdrs

HMS Swiftsure was a 70-gun third-rate ship of the line of the Royal Navy, built by Sir Anthony Deane at Harwich, and launched in 1673. By 1685 she had been reduced to a 66-gun ship.

In 1692 she saw action at the Battles of Barfleur and La Hogue.

She was rebuilt by Snelgrove of Deptford in 1696 as a 66-gun third rate. In 1707, she belonged to Admiral Sir Cloudesley Shovell's fleet. She saw action during the unsuccessful Battle of Toulon and was present during the great naval disaster off the Isles of Scilly when Shovell and four of his ships (Association, Firebrand, Romney and Eagle) were lost, claiming the lives of nearly 2,000 sailors. Swiftsure suffered little to no damage and finally managed to reach Portsmouth. She underwent a second rebuild at Woolwich Dockyard, relaunching on 20 November 1718 as a 70-gun third rate of the 1706 Establishment. She was renamed HMS Revenge at this time. On 25 February 1740 Revenge was ordered to be taken to pieces at Deptford, and to be rebuilt as a 70-gun third rate to the 1733 proposals of the 1719 Establishment. She was relaunched on 23 May 1742.

Revenge was sold out of the navy in 1787.
