= HMS Monmouth (1667) =

Royal Navy warship of the 17th and 18th centuries

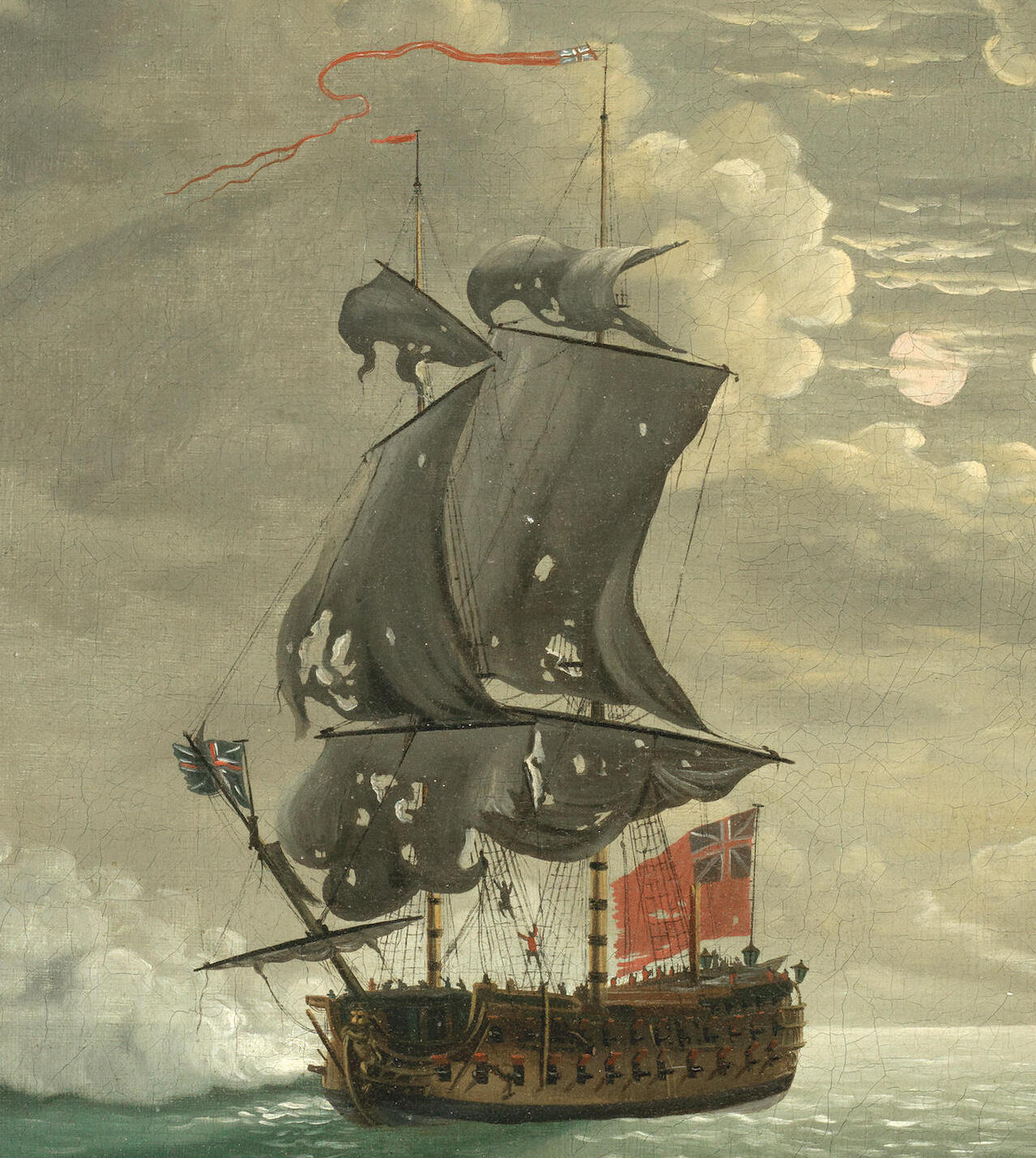
- Monmouth at the Battle of Cartagena

History

Great Britain
- Name: HMS Monmouth
- Builder: Phineas Pett II, Chatham dockyard
- Launched: 1667
- Honours and awards: Battle of Solebay; Battle of Texel; Battle of Barfleur; Battle of Vigo Bay; First Battle of Cape Finisterre; Second Battle of Cape Finisterre; Battle of Cartagena (1758)
- Fate: Broken up, 1767

General characteristics as built
- Class & type: 66-gun third-rate ship of the line
- Tons burthen: 856 bm
- Length: 118 ft 9 in (36.20 m) (keel)
- Beam: 36 ft 10 in (11.23 m)
- Depth of hold: 15 ft 6 in (4.72 m)
- Sail plan: Full-rigged ship
- Armament: 66 guns of various weights of shot

General characteristics after 1700 rebuild
- Class & type: 66-gun third-rate ship of the line
- Tons burthen: 944 bm
- Length: 147 ft 9 in (45.03 m) (gundeck)
- Beam: 38 ft (12 m)
- Depth of hold: 16 ft (4.9 m)
- Sail plan: Full-rigged ship
- Armament: 66 guns of various weights of shot

General characteristics after 1718 rebuild
- Class & type: 1706 Establishment 70-gun third-rate ship of the line
- Tons burthen: 1174 bm
- Length: 150 ft (46 m) (gundeck)
- Beam: 41 ft (12 m)
- Depth of hold: 17 ft 4 in (5.28 m)
- Sail plan: Full-rigged ship
- Armament: 70 guns: Gundeck (GD): 26 × 24-pounder guns; Upper gundeck (UD): 26 × 12-pounder guns; QD: 14 × 6-pounder guns; Fc: 4 × 6-pounder guns

General characteristics after 1742 rebuild
- Class & type: 1733 proposals 70-gun third-rate ship of the line
- Tons burthen: 1225 bm
- Length: 151 ft (46 m) (gundeck)
- Beam: 43 ft 5 in (13.23 m)
- Depth of hold: 17 ft 9 in (5.41 m)
- Sail plan: Full-rigged ship
- Armament: 70 guns: GD: 26 × 24-pounder guns; UD: 26 × 12-pounder guns; QD: 14 × 6-pounder guns; Fc: 4 × 6-pounder guns

HMS Monmouth was a 66-gun third-rate ship of the line of the Royal Navy, and was likely named for James, Duke of Monmouth. She served from 1667 to 1767, winning ten battle honours over a century of active service. She was rebuilt a total of three times during her career—each time effectively becoming a completely new ship.

== Construction and 17th-century battles ==
She was built at Chatham Dockyard in 1667 by Phineas Pett II—seeing action whilst still in the Thames, during the Raid on the Medway, and fought at the Battle of Solebay in 1672, shortly followed by the Battle of Texel in 1673. She fought at the Battle of Barfleur in 1692. Monmouth underwent her first rebuild at Woolwich Dockyard in 1700, remaining a 66-gun ship. She fought at the Battle of Vigo Bay in 1702 under Admiral John Baker who was also captain at the Capture of Gibraltar and the Battle of Málaga in 1704.

== Surviving the Scilly naval disaster of 1707 and reaching Portsmouth ==
In 1707, she had belonged to Admiral Sir Cloudesley Shovell's fleet. She saw action during the unsuccessful Battle of Toulon and was present during the great naval disaster off the Isles of Scilly when Shovell and four of his ships (Association, Firebrand, Romney and Eagle) were lost, claiming the lives of nearly 2,000 sailors. Monmouth suffered little to no damage and finally managed to reach Portsmouth.

== Rebuild and improved in 1718 and 1742 ==
Her second rebuild was carried out at Portsmouth Dockyard, where she was increased to a 70-gun ship built according to the 1706 Establishment, and relaunched on 3 June 1718. On 7 September 1739 Monmouth was ordered to be taken to pieces and rebuilt for what was to be the final time at Deptford according to the 1733 proposals of the 1719 Establishment. She was relaunched on 6 September 1742.

== Capturing a French privateer and bringing it to Plymouth ==
In 1747, she fought at Finisterre and Ushant. On 2 March 1747 Monmouth, Captain Henry Harrison, brought into Plymouth a French privateer of 20 carriage guns and eight swivel guns. The privateer was the Comte de Maurepas and capturing her required a chase of three days. At about the same time Monmouth captured the privateer Queen of Hungary.

== Battle of Cartagena ==
On 28 February 1758 Monmouth captured the larger French ship Foudroyant, as part of the Battle of Cartagena. After Monmouth's commander, Captain Arthur Gardiner (formerly Byng's flag captain), was severely wounded by a strike of grape shot on the forehead and taken below deck, the four ship's lieutenants (Robert Carkett, David Winzar, Stephen Hammick and Lt Campbell) continued the battle. Second Lt Stephen Hammick was the commander of the lower gundeck and a poem was composed by the Colley Cibber which ran: "Whilst gallant Hammick points his guns with care, not one random shot he fires in the air....etc."

The battle was concluded after the arrival of HMS Swiftsure, who delivered the final volley. The captain of the Foudroyant, M. le Marquis de Quesne, after surrendering his ship to Lt Carkett on the Monmouth, preferred to hand his sword to Carkett, for whom he had the greatest admiration. The total losses on the Monmouth were 29 killed and 81 wounded. The dead, including Captain Gardiner, were buried at sea near Cape de Gata on the afternoon of Saturday 4 March. The ship was then taken to Gibraltar for repair.

In a small twist of fate, the Foudroyant was later to be commanded by Nelson - who was a cousin of Lt Hammick.

== Final years and reputation of being undefeated in battle ==
Monmouth was also present at Belle Île in 1761.

After a hundred years of service, she was finally broken up in 1767; a newspaper of the time gave her epitaph as

There was no ship she ever chased that she did not overtake: there was no enemy she ever fought that she did not capture.
