= HMS St Andrew (1670) =

Ship of the line of the Royal Navy

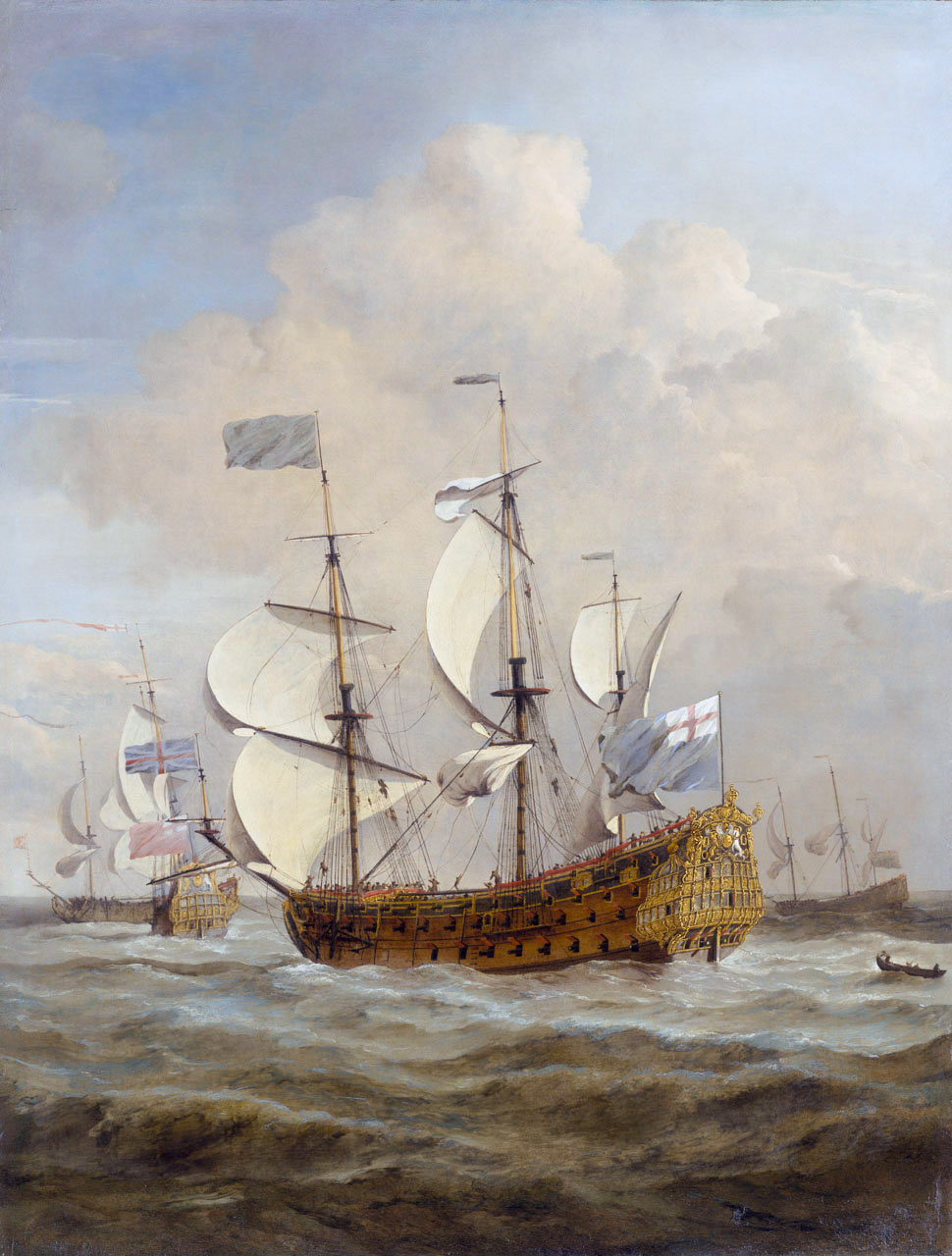
- 'HMS St Andrew at Sea in a Moderate Breeze', oil on canvas, by Willem van de Velde the Younger

History

Great Britain
- Name: HMS St Andrew
- Builder: Christopher Pett, Woolwich Dockyard
- Launched: 4 October 1670
- Renamed: HMS Royal Anne
- Fate: Broken up, 1727

General characteristics as built
- Class & type: 96-gun first-rate ship of the line
- Tons burthen: 1298 bm
- Length: 129 ft (39 m) (keel)
- Beam: 43 ft 6 in (13.26 m)
- Depth of hold: 18 ft 8 in (5.69 m)
- Sail plan: Full-rigged ship
- Armament: 96 guns of various weights of shot

General characteristics after 1703 rebuild
- Class & type: 100-gun first-rate ship of the line
- Tons burthen: 1721 80/94 bm
- Length: 170 ft (52 m) (gundeck); 140 ft 6 in (42.82 m) (keel)
- Beam: 48 ft (15 m)
- Depth of hold: 19 ft 4 in (5.89 m)
- Sail plan: Full-rigged ship
- Armament: 100 guns of various weights of shot

HMS St Andrew was a 96-gun first-rate ship of the line of the Royal Navy, built by Christopher Pett at Woolwich Dockyard under the supervision of Christopher Pett until his death in March 1668, completed by Jonas Shish, and launched in 1670. Commanded by George Churchill, she took part in the 1692 victory over the French navy at Barfleur & La Hogue.

In 1703, she was renamed HMS Royal Anne, and rebuilt at Woolwich as a first rate of 100 guns. In 1707, she served as flagship of Vice-Admiral of the Blue Sir George Byng and belonged to Admiral Sir Cloudesley Shovell's fleet. She saw action during the unsuccessful Battle of Toulon and was present during the great naval disaster off the Isles of Scilly when Shovell and four of his ships (Association, Firebrand, Romney and Eagle) were lost, claiming the lives of nearly 2,000 sailors. Royal Anne suffered little to no damage and finally managed to reach Portsmouth.

The Royal Anne was broken up in 1727.
