= HMS Charles (1668) =

Ship of the line of the Royal Navy

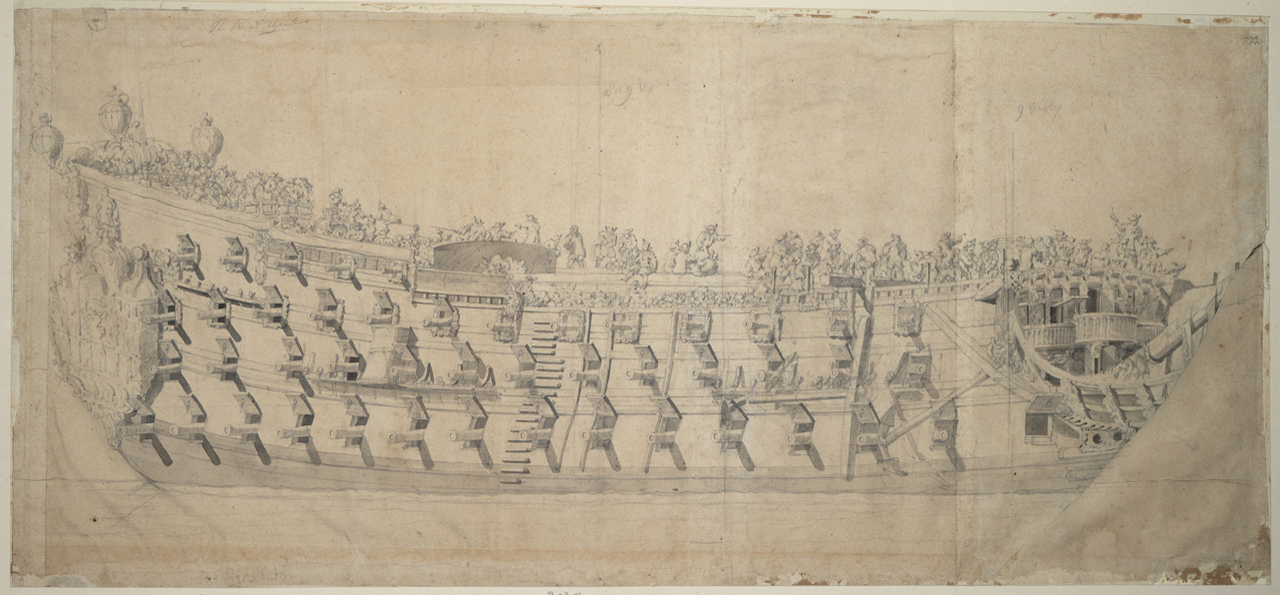
- Portrait of the English ship Charles, circa 1776 by Willem van de Velde the Elder

History

Great Britain
- Name: HMS Charles
- Builder: Christopher Pett and Jonas Shish, Deptford Dockyard
- Launched: 10 March 1668
- Renamed: HMS St George, 1687
- Fate: Broken up, 1774

General characteristics as built
- Class & type: 96-gun first-rate ship of the line
- Tons burthen: 1229 bm
- Length: 128 ft (39 m) (keel)
- Beam: 42 ft 6 in (12.95 m)
- Depth of hold: 18 ft 6 in (5.64 m)
- Sail plan: Full-rigged ship
- Armament: 96 guns of various weights of shot

General characteristics after 1701 rebuild
- Class & type: 90-gun second-rate ship of the line
- Tons burthen: 1470 bm
- Length: 162 ft 6 in (49.53 m) (gundeck)
- Beam: 45 ft 5 in (13.84 m)
- Depth of hold: 18 ft 7 in (5.66 m)
- Sail plan: Full-rigged ship
- Armament: 90 guns of various weights of shot

General characteristics after 1740 rebuild
- Class & type: 1733 proposals 90-gun second-rate ship of the line
- Tons burthen: 1655 bm
- Length: 166 ft (51 m) (gundeck)
- Beam: 47 ft 9 in (14.55 m)
- Depth of hold: 19 ft 6 in (5.94 m)
- Sail plan: Full-rigged ship
- Armament: 90 guns: Gundeck: 26 × 32 pdrs; Middle gundeck: 26 × 18 pdrs; Upper gundeck: 26 × 9 pdrs; Quarterdeck: 10 × 6 pdrs; Forecastle: 2 × 6 pdrs

HMS Charles was a 96-gun first-rate ship of the line of the Royal Navy, built by Christopher Pett at Deptford Dockyard until his death in March 1668, then completed by Jonas Shish after being launched in the same month. Her name was formally Charles the Second, but she was known simply as Charles, particularly after 1673 when the contemporary Royal Charles was launched.

Charles was renamed HMS St George in 1687 and reclassified as a second rate in 1691. In 1699–1701 she was rebuilt at Portsmouth Dockyard as a 90-gun second rate. In 1707, she belonged to Admiral Sir Cloudesley Shovell's fleet. Under the command of Captain James Lord Dursley, she saw action during the unsuccessful Battle of Toulon and was present during the great naval disaster off the Isles of Scilly when Shovell and four of his ships (Association, Firebrand, Romney and Eagle) were lost, claiming the lives of nearly 2,000 sailors. St George also struck rocks off Scilly, but got off.

St George was taken to pieces at Portsmouth in 1726 to be rebuilt again. On 4 September 1733, St George was ordered to be rebuilt to the 1733 proposals of the 1719 Establishment. She was relaunched on 3 April 1740.

She was eventually broken up in September 1774.

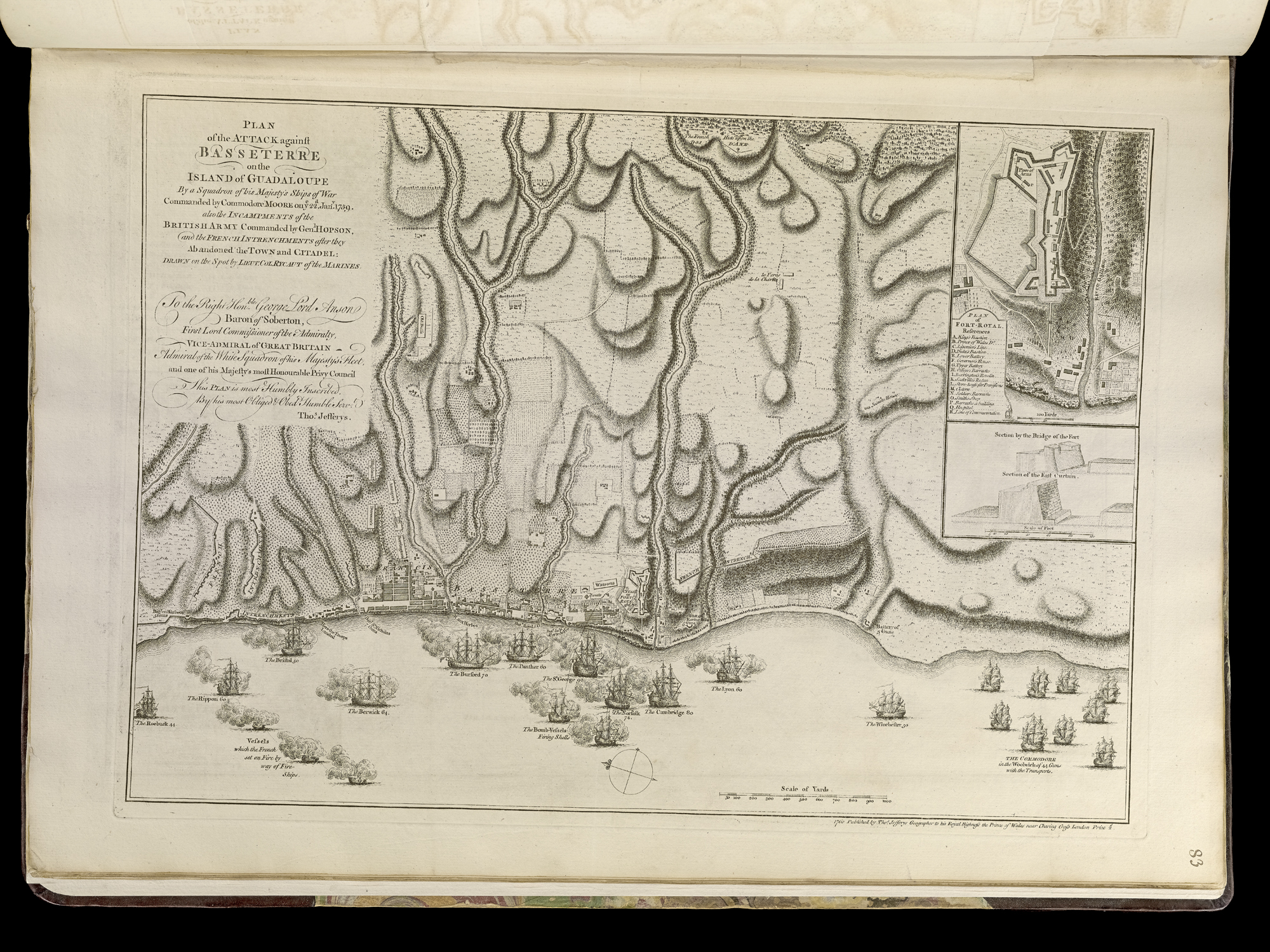
Plan of the attack against Basseterre, Guadeloupe by a squadron of Royal Navy ships of war commanded by Commodore Moore on 22 January 1759 - also the encampments of the British. Shows St George

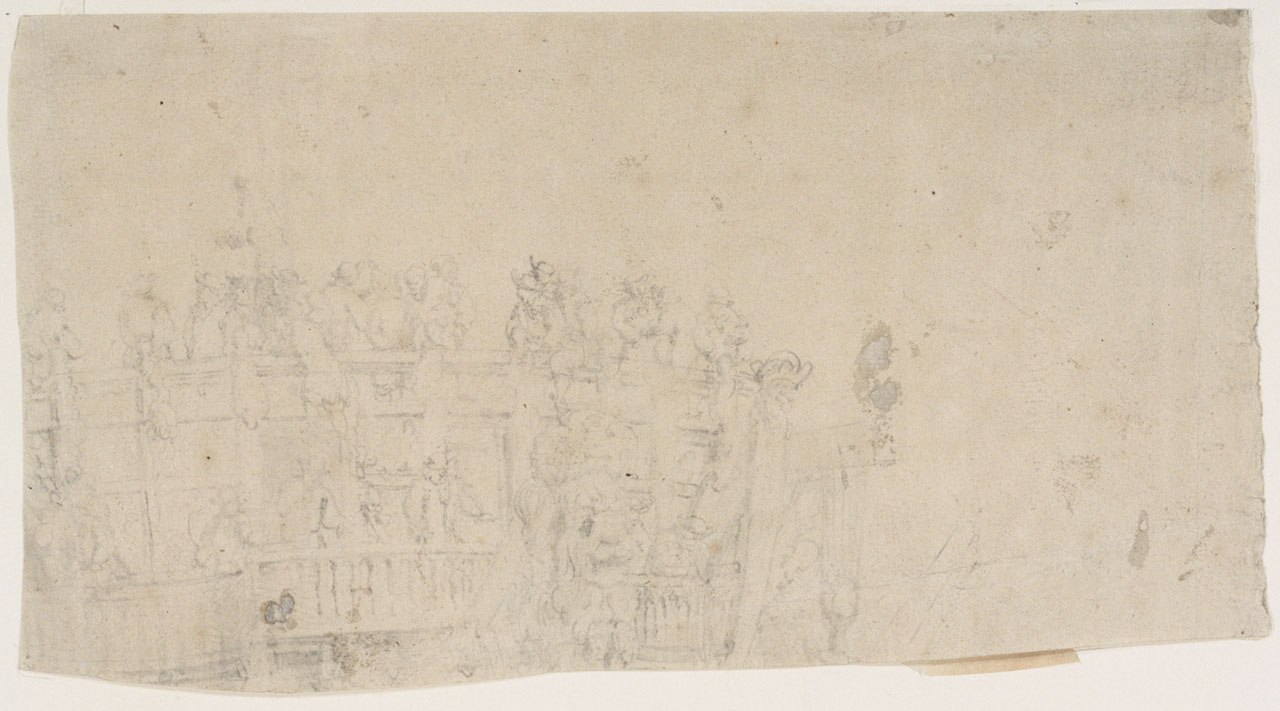
A drawing of the beakhead bulkhead of the English second-rate Charles, circa 1676 by van de Velde the Elder
