= HMS Torbay (1693) =

Ship of the line of the Royal Navy

History

Great Britain
- Name: HMS Torbay
- Namesake: Torbay
- Builder: Harding, Deptford Dockyard
- Launched: 16 December 1693
- Fate: Broken up, 1749

General characteristics as built
- Class & type: 80-gun third rate ship of the line
- Tons burthen: 1,202 bm
- Length: 156 ft (47.5 m) (gundeck)
- Beam: 41 ft 11 in (12.8 m)
- Depth of hold: 17 ft 4 in (5.3 m)
- Propulsion: Sails
- Sail plan: Full-rigged ship
- Armament: 80 guns of various weights of shot

General characteristics after 1719 rebuild
- Class & type: 1706 Establishment 80-gun third rate ship of the line
- Tons burthen: 1,296 bm
- Length: 156 ft (47.5 m) (gundeck)
- Beam: 43 ft 6 in (13.3 m)
- Depth of hold: 17 ft 8 in (5.4 m)
- Propulsion: Sails
- Sail plan: Full-rigged ship
- Armament: 80 guns: Gundeck: 26 × 32 pdrs; Middle gundeck: 26 × 12 pdrs; Upper gundeck: 24 × 6 pdrs; Quarterdeck: 4 × 6 pdrs

HMS Torbay was an 80-gun third rate ship of the line of the Royal Navy, launched at Deptford Dockyard on 16 December 1693. In 1707, she served as flagship of Rear-Admiral of the Blue Sir John Norris and belonged to Admiral Sir Cloudesley Shovell's fleet. She saw action during the unsuccessful Battle of Toulon and was present during the great naval disaster off the Isles of Scilly when Shovell and four of his ships (Association, Firebrand, Romney and Eagle) were lost, claiming the lives of nearly 2,000 sailors. Torbay suffered little to no damage and finally managed to reach Portsmouth.

She was rebuilt at Deptford, according to the 1706 Establishment, and was relaunched on 23 May 1719. After this, her 80 guns were mounted on three gundecks instead of her original two, though she continued to be classified as a third rate.

In 1726 Torbay was the flagship of Sir Charles Wager at the Naval Blockade of Reval.

Torbay was broken up in 1749.

Torbay was notable for breaking the defensive boom in the Battle of Vigo Bay.
