= Thomas Dilkes =

Rear-Admiral Sir Thomas Dilkes
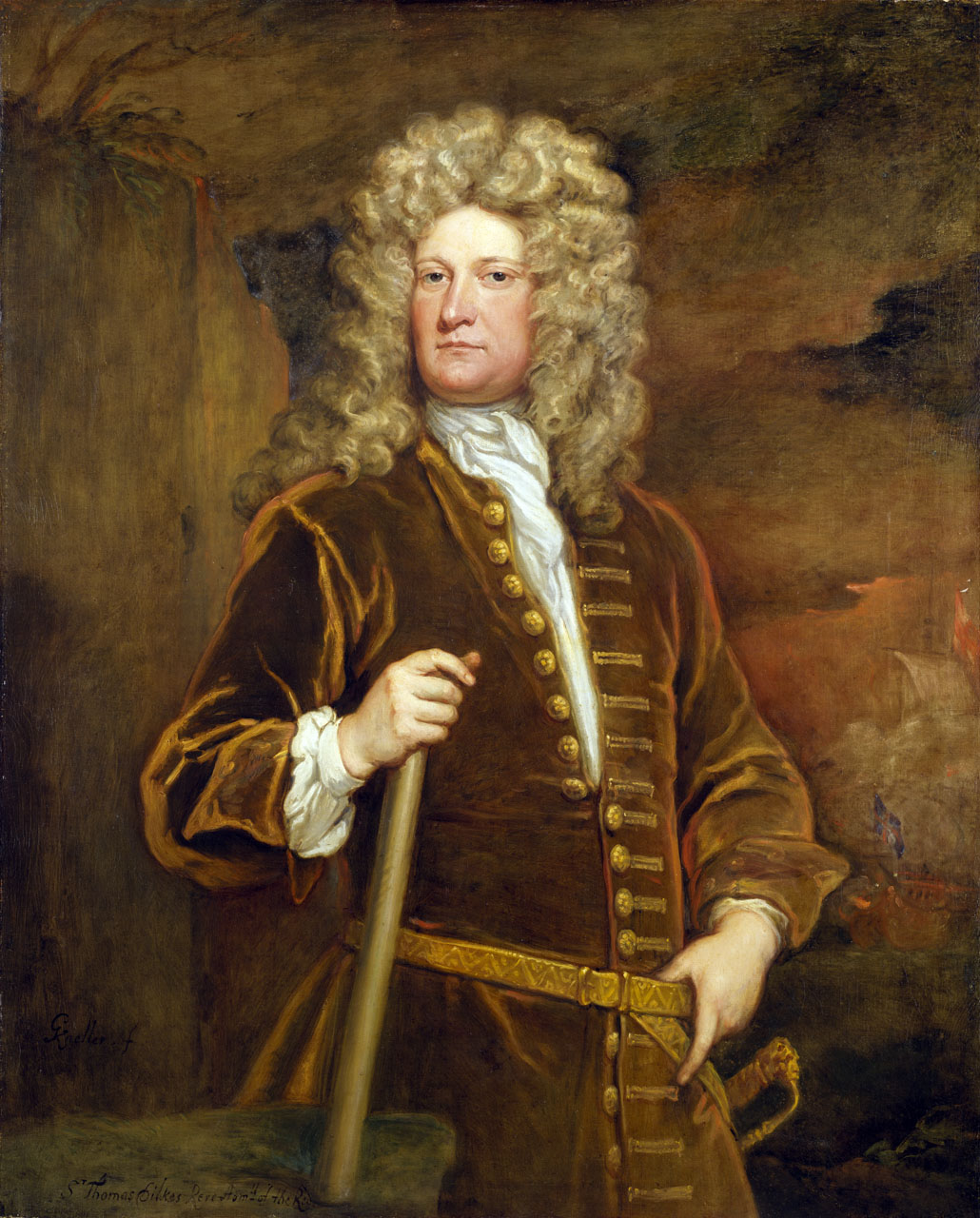
- Portrait of Dilkes c.1704, by Godfrey Kneller
- Born: c. 1667
- Died: 12 December 1707; Livorno
- Burial place: Old English Cemetery, Livorno
- Military career
- Allegiance: Kingdom of England; Kingdom of Great Britain
- Branch: Royal Navy (1683–1707); Royal Navy (1707)
- Service years: 1683–1707
- Rank: Rear-Admiral
- Commands: Charles; Adventure; Restoration; Dunkirk; Rupert; Breda; Somerset
- Conflicts: Nine Years' War: Battles of Barfleur and La Hogue; War of the Spanish Succession: Battle of Vigo Bay; Battle of Málaga; Battle of Cabrita Point; Siege of Barcelona; Siege of Toulon

Rear-Admiral Sir Thomas Dilkes (c. 1667 – 12 December 1707) was an officer in the Royal Navy.

== Early life ==
Thomas Dilkes was born in around 1667 to a junior branch of the Dilke family of Maxstoke Castle in Warwickshire. He was also related to Sir William Coventry. He joined the Royal Navy in 1683, and served as a Volunteer-per-order until 1686. He was appointed second lieutenant of the Hampshire on 29 April 1687, and of the Henrietta on 3 September 1688. On 8 April 1689 he was given his first command: the fire ship Charles.

== Captain ==
In 1692 he achieved post rank with command of the fourth-rate Adventure, and commanded this vessel in the battles of Barfleur and La Hogue. In October of that year he captured two privateers in combination with the Rupert, then captured a large privateer on his own in December. In July 1693 he was given command of the Restoration, followed by the Dunkirk in 1694, the Rupert in 1695, and the Breda in 1696.

In 1696, he was part of an ill-fated squadron that sailed to the West Indies under the command of Vice-admiral John Nevell. When Nevell, his second in command George Mees, and almost all the other captains died of yellow fever, Dilkes succeeded to the command and brought the squadron home in October 1697. In the peace which followed the Treaty of Ryswick he held a succession of short-lived commands, and was seriously injured in a shipwreck on the Irish coast in 1699.

Tha accession of Queen Anne and the outbreak of the War of the Spanish Succession in 1702 brought Dilkes a new command: the 80-gun Somerset. He took part in the expedition to Cádiz under Sir George Rooke, who transferred his flag to that ship during the battle of Vigo Bay, deeming his flagship the Royal Sovereign too large to enter the harbour.

== Admiral ==
On 1 March 1703, Dilkes was promoted to be rear-admiral of the white, hoisting his flag aboard the Kent. In July of that year he led his fleet in an operation described by William Laird Clowes as "one of the most brilliant of the early part of the war." Sailing from Spithead on 22 July, he learned of a large number of merchantmen heading for Granville. Arriving outside that town on 5 August [O.S. 25 July], he found forty-five merchant vessels guarded by three small men-of-war. Though the French withdrew to waters too shallow for the larger English ships to follow, Dilkes attacked vigorously with his ships' boats and shallower draft vessels. In the three days that followed he captured one man-at-war, destroying the other two. He also captured fifteen merchantmen and burned or sunk twenty-six, leaving just four survivors of the original flotilla. As a result, Queen Anne ordered gold medals to be struck and presented to Dilkes and his captains. He spent the next few months based in Cork, escorting convoys and patrolling the entrance to the English Channel, before returning to Spithead just in time to avoid the Great Storm of 1703 on 26 November. During this year he was elected to represent Castlemartyr in the Irish House of Commons.

The following year, with his flag still in the Kent, he sailed with Sir Cloudesley Shovell to join Sir George Rooke's fleet off Lisbon. Operating with this fleet, on 23 March [O.S. 12 March], he led the Kent, Bedford and Antelope in the pursuit and capture of three Spanish warships: Porta Cœli, Santa Theresa and St. Nicholas. He was not present at the capture of Gibraltar, but soon afterwards took a prominent part in the battle of Málaga as rear-admiral of the white squadron, in acknowledgment of which he was knighted by the Queen on 22 October shortly after his return to England.

He was promoted to Rear Admiral of the Red on 18 January 1705, and sent to escort a convoy of merchant ships to Lisbon the following month, hoisting his flag in the Revenge. On arrival in the Tagus, he placed himself under the command of Sir John Leake and, on 21 March [O.S. 10 March], had a principal share in dealing with the French squadron that was blockading Gibraltar. The French force, consisting of five ships of the line, fled on the approach of the much larger British fleet. In the ensuing Battle of Cabrita Point, Dilkes led the capture of the sixty-gun Arrogant, whilst the remaining French vessels were either captured or destroyed. On 22 June [O.S. 11 June], Sir Cloudesley Shovell arrived in Lisbon with reinforcements, and Dilkes remained through the summer with this grand fleet under the joint command of Shovell and Lord Peterborough. He took part in the successful siege of Barcelona before returning to England with Shovell in November.

He seems to have spent 1706 in home waters, employed chiefly in the blockade of Dunkirk, but the following year he sailed once more for the Mediterranean. He joined the fleet commanded by Sir Cloudesley Shovell and took part in operation to besiege Toulon in combination with land forces commanded by Prince Eugene of Savoy. The arrival of French reinforcements meant that siege had to be abandoned, but Shovell was determined to get something from the engagement and ordered Dilkes to bombard the French fleet confined within the town. On 21 August [O.S. 10 August] 1707 he hoisted his flag aboard the Romney and led a flotilla of bomb ketches close inshore. They continually bombarded the town, destroying two French ships and damaging three more, until being driven off by shore batteries the following morning. The French completed the job themselves, seeking to avoid their capture or destruction, they scuttled their entire fleet.

Shovell left for England immediately after the siege was raised, though he would perish en route in the Scilly naval disaster. Dilkes was left in command of the Mediterranean fleet and went to Barcelona to confer with Archduke Charles, the Habsburg claimant to the Spanish throne. Charles wanted him to invade Sardinia and concentrate on defending the coast of Catalonia, but as these projects did not fit with his orders from London, Dilkes declined.

Following this conference, he sailed for Italy, anchoring in Livorno on 30 November [O.S. 19 November]. On arrival, a dispute arose between the admiral and the local authorities over the priority of saluting. Dilkes claimed the right to be saluted first by the castle, but the answer came that this honour was only offered to admirals or vice-admirals. Rear-admiral Dilkes had to be content with this answer, and as a conciliatory gesture he was invited to a public dinner on shore on 12 December [O.S. 1 December]. Returning to his flagship after this meal he caught a chill, followed by a fever, from which he died on 12 December 1707. His death coming so soon after his dispute with the grand-ducal court led to rumours that he had been poisoned; John Campbell, for example, writing that his fever was "caused, as most people imagined, by an Italian dinner." These rumours have been dismissed as groundless.

He was buried in the British cemetery outside the city on 25 December [O.S. 14 December]. According to John Charnock, "as for the character of this brave and unfortunate man we find much to applaud and nothing to censure [...] the respect of those who were his superiors in command he always possessed; the service on which he was ordered, he constantly did his utmost to accomplish."

== Politics ==
In 1703, Dilkes was returned to the Irish House of Commons as a Member of Parliament (MP) for the borough of Castlemartyr in County Cork. He held the seat until 1709.

== Family ==
He married Mary, daughter of Murrough O'Brien, 1st Earl of Inchiquin and widow of Henry Boyle of Castlemartyr. Together they had one son: Michael O'Brien Dilkes who died a lieutenant-general in 1774.

After Dilkes's death, Mary married again – to Colonel John Irwin. She died on 25 April 1727 and was buried in Ripley, Surrey.

Military offices
Preceded by Sir Cloudesley Shovell	Commander-in-Chief, Mediterranean Fleet; 1707	Succeeded by Sir John Leake
Parliament of Ireland
Preceded by Thomas Keightley; Joseph Deane	Member of Parliament for Castlemartyr; 1703–1709; With: Robert FitzGerald	Succeeded by Robert FitzGerald; St John Brodrick
