= Naval Air Command Sub Aqua Club =

British organization within the Royal Navy

Crest of NACSAC

The Naval Air Command Sub Aqua Club (NACSAC) was an organization within the Royal Navy that oversaw sports and technical diving training activities for naval aviation and fleet units. Today, it has branches at RNAS Culdrose (HMS Seahawk) and RNAS Yeovilton (HMS Heron). Both bases provide training, and club members regularly dive into their local areas on weekends. Diving instruction, from beginner to advanced level, is offered under the auspices of the British Sub-Aqua Club. In 2005, NACSAC was closed down as an organization in favour of the Royal Navy Sub Aqua Club, which is what Lieutenant Graham and CPO Larn had wanted from the outset of NACSAC, which was only given that title since HMS Vernon, the RN Diving School at Portsmouth would not support the idea of sport diving within the service.

== History ==
In the early 1960s, a group of chief petty officers from the Naval Air Command formed amateur diving clubs and mounted annual expeditions. These clubs were first based at the naval air stations of Portland (HMS Osprey), Culdrose, and Yeovilton and conducted diving under the auspices of an umbrella organization which became known as the "Naval Air Command Sub Aqua Club" (NACSAC). The club's first chairman was Lieutenant Roy Graham (1924–2007), an engineer officer who had begun his diving career aboard the aircraft carrier HMS Victorious. Whilst in Gibraltar, Graham was in charge of diving training on this ship. Following a shallow water diving course with 24 entrants and only himself and a Royal Air Force medical officer finishing the rigorous training, Graham became the only Fleet Air Arm officer with a naval diving qualification.

Chief Petty Officer Richard Larn was the organization's Diving Officer from its formation in 1960, who, apart from a period on HMS Bulwark between 1967 and 1968, continued to organize training and expeditions until his retirement from the navy in 1971. One of the club's first projects was to send a team of divers to the Isles of Scilly to find a historic Royal Navy ship, HMS Association, a 90-gun ship of the line lost in the great naval disaster in 1707. In 1964 approximately ten NACSAC members - including the shipwreck expert and writer, Chief Petty Officer Richard Larn - arrived on Sicily, they were believed to be only the second group of divers to visit the area. Their initial dives began a series of navy visits that continued for four years. In 1964, 1965, and 1966, The divers could only access the Western Rocks, but barely around the Gilstone Ledge, where a later expedition managed to locate the wreck of HMS Association in 1967. The rediscovery of the site also led to more government legislation, notably the Protection of Wrecks Act 1973, passed in an attempt to preserve British historic wreck sites as part of the maritime heritage.

The annual expeditions, organized to promote diving as an exciting sport, had become a key focus of NACSAC activities. Despite changes to the Royal Navy Fleet command structure, NACSAC flourished, at one time having branches in seven Fleet Air Arm bases, until superseded by the Royal Navy Sub Aqua Club.
