= HMS Colchester (1694) =

Ship of the line of the Royal Navy

History

England
- Name: HMS Colchester
- Ordered: 16 November 1693
- Builder: Sir Henry Johnson, Blackwall Yard
- Launched: 23 October 1694
- Commissioned: 10 December 1694
- Fate: Wrecked in Whitesand Bay, Cornwall, 16 January 1704

General characteristics
- Class & type: 50-gun fourth rate ship of the line
- Tons burthen: 696 72/94 bm
- Length: 131 ft 4 in (40.0 m) (gundeck) 111 ft 8 in (34.0 m) (keel)
- Beam: 34 ft 3 in (10.4 m)
- Depth of hold: 13 ft 7 in (4.1 m)
- Propulsion: Sails
- Sail plan: Full-rigged ship
- Armament: 50 guns: Lower gundeck 22 x 12 pdr guns; Upper dundeck 20 x 8 pdr demi-culverin3; Quarterdeck 6 x 6 pdr sakers; Forecastle 2 x 6 pdr sakers

HMS Colchester was a 50-gun fourth rate ship of the line of the English Royal Navy, ordered to be built by commercial contract by Sir Henry Johnson on 16 November 1693 (along with her sistership, the Romney - the contract for both ships was signed on 23 February 1694), and both ships were launched at the contractor's Blackwall Yard on 23 October 1694. The Colchester was commissioned on 10 December 1694 under Captain Frederick Weighman, for service in the West Indies.

She was wrecked in a storm - while on passage from Ireland to Plymouth - at Whitesand Bay, Sennen Cove, Cornwall on 16 January 1704 with the loss of approximately 170 lives including the captain (David Wavell).
