= 1706 Establishment =

Formalised set of dimensions for Royal Navy vessels

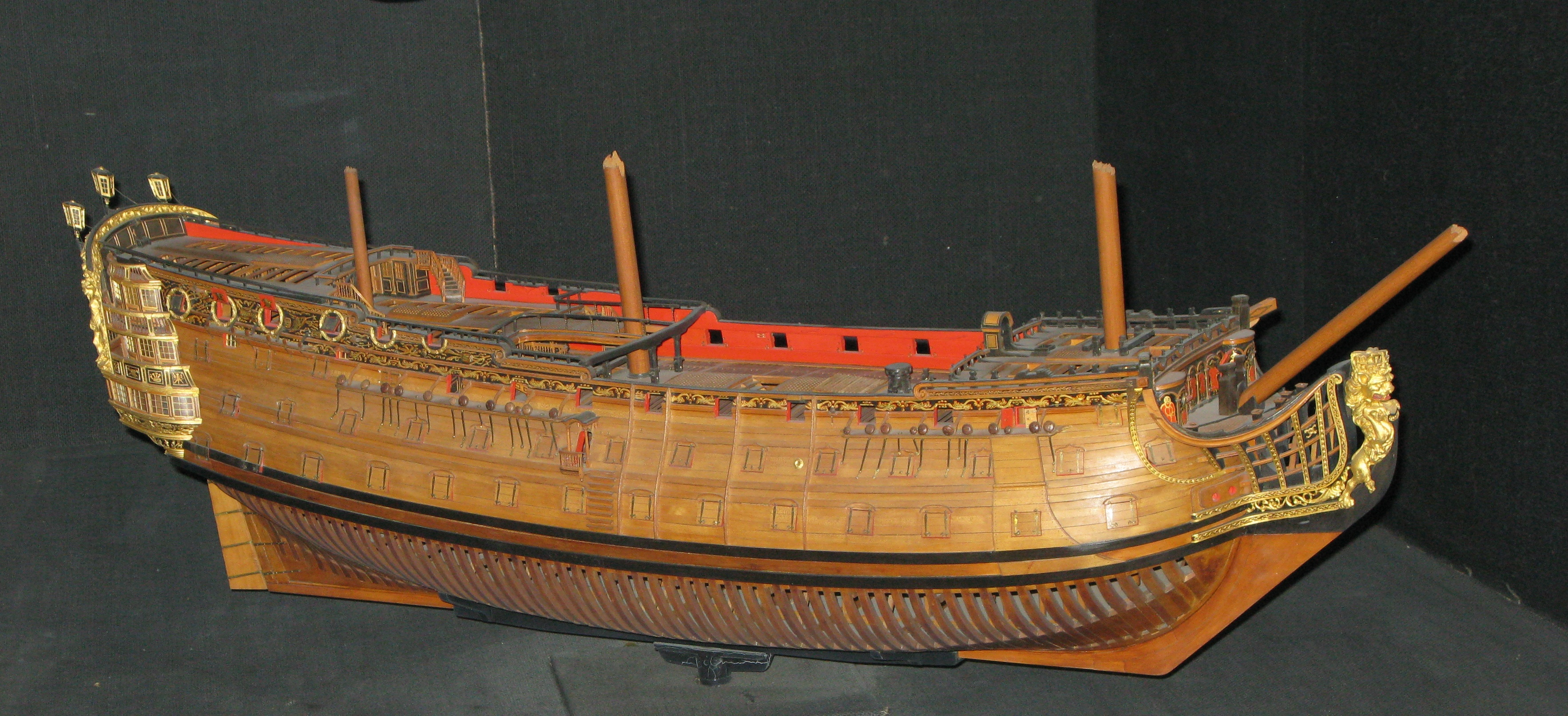
- A model of the hull of a 90-gun ship following the dimensions of the 1706 Establishment.

Class overview
- Operators: Royal Navy; French Navy
- Succeeded by: 1719 Establishment

The 1706 Establishment was the first formal set of dimensions for ships of the Royal Navy. Two previous sets of dimensions had existed before, though these were only for specific shipbuilding programmes running for only a given amount of time. In contrast, the 1706 Establishment was intended to be permanent.

== Origins ==
Dimensions for ships had been established for the "Thirty Ships" building programme of 1677, and while these dimensions saw use until 1695, this was merely because of the success of the 1677 ships and the lack of perceived need to change them. Dimensions were then laid down for the 1691 "Twenty-seven Ships" programme to build seventeen eighty-gun and ten sixty-gun double-decked ships of the line, though the dimensions were abandoned before the program was complete, with the final four eighty-gun ships being constructed with three gun decks.

The origins of the formalized 1706 Establishment can be traced to February 1705, when Prince George of Denmark, the Lord High Admiral at the time, ordered the Navy Board to determine a set of dimensions for second-rate ships. Though the second-rate ships appear to have been the central focus of the Establishment, the Board was also directed to consider dimensions for ships of the third (80 and 70 guns), fourth (60 and 50 guns), and fifth-rate ships (40 and 30 guns). Because of their rarity and power, first rates were not addressed by the Establishment and were given individual designs, whilst smaller vessels had a low enough cost to allow experimentation. The Navy Board used existing ships considered to be the best in their respective classes as the bases for these dimensions.

== Implementation ==
The Navy Board produced sets of dimensions for ships from forty, fifty, sixty, seventy, eighty, and ninety guns (they decided against doing so for thirty-gun ships). After a last-minute adjustment created by Admiral George Churchill, the dimensions were sent out to the dockyards together with an order that they were to be strictly adhered to, and that they should apply to rebuilds as well as new ships. The implementation of the Establishment – the first of many – began an era of notorious conservatism in naval administration. Though there would be no significant technological changes until the following century, the naval architecture of the 1706 Establishment slowly became more antiquated for the early eighteenth century.

== Individual ship types ==
=== 90-gun second-rates ===
General characteristics for 90-gun second-rates
- Type: 90-gun second-rate ship of the line
- Tons burthen: 1551 bm
- Length: 162 ft 0 in (49.4 m) (gundeck); 132 ft 0 in (40.2 m) (keel)
- Beam: 47 ft 0 in (14.3 m)
- Depth of hold: 18 ft 6 in (5.6 m)
- Sail plan: Full-rigged ship
- Complement: 680 officers and men
- Armament: 96 guns (1703 Establishment): Lower deck: 26 × demi-cannon (32 lb); Middle deck: 26 × culverin (18 lb); Upper deck: 26 × demi-culverin (9 lb); Quarterdeck: 12 × 6 lb; Forecastle: 4 × 6 lb; Roundhouse: 2 × 6 lb

Seven existing second-rates were rebuilt to the 1706 Establishment, including three whose reconstruction was ordered in 1704–1705. These first three were the Marlborough of 1706 (rebuilt from the old Saint Michael), Blenheim of 1709 (rebuilt from the old Duchess) and the Vanguard of 1710. The other four ships were the Neptune of 1710, Ossory of 1711, Sandwich of 1715 and Barfleur of 1716.

These ships were originally armed as 96-gun ships under the 1703 Establishment of Guns. They were re-armed as 90-gun ships under the 1716 Establishment of Guns, with heavier 32 lb and 9 lb on the lower and upper decks (the middle deck 18 lb were unaltered), but with one pair of 6 lb removed from each of the partial decks above to leave:

- Quarterdeck – 10 × 6 lb
- Forecastle – 2 × 6 lb
- Roundhouse – nil

=== 80-gun third-rates ===
General characteristics for 80-gun third-rates
- Type: 80-gun third-rate ship of the line
- Tons burthen: 1283 29/94 bm
- Length: 156 ft 0 in (47.5 m) (gundeck); 127 ft 6 in (38.9 m) (keel)
- Beam: 43 ft 6 in (13.3 m)
- Depth of hold: 17 ft 8 in (5.4 m)
- Sail plan: Full-rigged ship
- Complement: 570 officers and men (360 in peacetime)
- Armament: 80 guns (1703 Establishment): Lower deck: 26 × 24 lb; Middle deck: 26 × 12 lb; Upper deck: 22 × 6 lb; Quarterdeck: 6 × 6 lb

Eight of the older type of two-decker 80-gun ships were rebuilt as three-deckers under the 1706 Establishment – the Boyne and Humber launched in 1708, the Russell in 1709, the Dorsetshire in 1712, the Newark and Shrewsbury in 1713, Cambridge in 1715 and Torbay in 1719. In addition, two new ships were built to this specification as replacements for ships lost in 1707 – the Devonshire and Cumberland both being launched in 1710.

The ships were initially armed with 80 guns as per the 1703 Establishment of Guns, as shown in the table at right. The 1716 Establishment of Guns replaced the 24-pounder guns on the lower deck by an equal number of 32 lb. It also added one pair of 6 lb to the upper deck, removing one pair of 6 lb from the quarterdeck.

=== 70-gun third-rates ===
General characteristics for 70-gun third-rates
- Type: 70-gun third-rate ship of the line
- Tons burthen: 1069 bm
- Length: 150 ft 0 in (45.7 m) (gundeck); 122 ft 0 in (37.2 m) (keel)
- Beam: 41 ft 0 in (12.5 m)
- Depth of hold: 17 ft 4 in (5.3 m)
- Sail plan: Full-rigged ship
- Complement: 500 officers and men (255 in peacetime)
- Armament: 70 guns (1703 Establishment): Lower deck: 26 × 24 lb; Upper deck: 24 × 9 lb; Quarterdeck: 12 × 6 lb; Forecastle: 4 × 6 lb; Roundhouse: 4 × 3 lb

Following the loss of four 70-gun ships in a single night during the Great Storm on 27 November 1703, four replacements were ordered from the Royal Dockyards just three weeks later – the Northumberland, Resolution and Stirling Castle being launched in 1705 and the Nassau in 1707. Another four were ordered in 1705–1706, again from the Dockyards – the Elizabeth and Restoration launched in 1706, while another Resolution and Captain were launched in 1708. Subsequently, two more ships were newbuilt (the Grafton and Hampton Court, both launched in 1709) and three rebuilt from existing third-rates (the Edgar and Yarmouth in 1709, and Orford in 1713) by contract; and another five were rebuilt in the Dockyards – the Royal Oak, Expedition, Suffolk, Monmouth and Revenge.

The ships were initially armed with 70 guns as per the 1703 Establishment of Guns, as shown in the table at right. Under the 1716 Establishment, a thirteenth pair of 24 lb was added on the lower deck, while the demi-culverins (9 lb) on the upper deck were upgraded to 12 lb. An extra pair of 6 lb was added to the quarterdeck, while the 3 lb were removed from the roundhouse to retain the total at 70 guns.

=== 60-gun fourth-rates ===
General characteristics For 60-gun fourth-rates
- Type: 60-gun fourth-rate ship of the line
- Tons burthen: 914 2/94 bm
- Length: 144 ft 0 in (43.9 m) (gundeck); 119 ft 0 in (36.3 m) (keel)
- Beam: 38 ft 0 in (11.6 m)
- Depth of hold: 15 ft 8 in (4.8 m)
- Sail plan: Full-rigged ship
- Complement: 365 officers and men (240 in peacetime)
- Armament: 64 guns (1703 Establishment): Lower deck: 24 × 18 lb; Upper deck: 26 × 9 lb; Quarterdeck: 10 × 6 lb; Forecastle: 4 × 6 lb

Four 60-gun ships were newbuilt to the 1706 Establishment – the Plymouth launched in 1708, the Lion and Gloucester in 1709, and the Rippon in 1712 – while four existing 60-gun ships were rebuilt to the same specification from 1714 onwards – the Montagu, Medway, Kingston and Nottingham.

As per the 1703 Establishment of Guns, the ships were initially armed with 64 guns as shown in the table at right. The 1716 Establishment of Guns replaced the 18 lb on the lower deck by 24 lb, and reduced the ships to 60 guns by removing one pair of 6 lb from the quarterdeck and another pair from the forecastle to result in a composition of:

- Lower deck: 24 × 24 lb
- Upper deck: 26 × 9 lb
- Quarterdeck: 8 × 6 lb
- Forecastle: 2 × 6 lb

=== 50-gun fourth-rates ===
General characteristics For 50-gun fourth-rates
- Type: 50-gun fourth-rate ship of the line
- Tons burthen: 703 68/94 bm
- Length: 130 ft 0 in (39.6 m) (gundeck); 108 ft 0 in (32.9 m) (keel)
- Beam: 35 ft 0 in (10.7 m)
- Depth of hold: 14 ft 0 in (4.3 m)
- Sail plan: Full-rigged ship
- Complement: 280 officers and men (185 in peacetime)
- Armament: 54 guns (1703 Establishment): Lower deck: 22 × 12 lb; Upper deck: 22 × 6 lb; Quarterdeck: 8 × 6 lb; Forecastle: 2 × 6 lb

Eleven new 50-gun ships were built to the 1706 Establishment (all as replacements for fourth-rates lost during the war years from 1703 onwards) – the Salisbury launched in 1707, the Falmouth, Ruby, Chester and Romney in 1708, the Pembroke in 1710, the Bristol, Gloucester and Ormonde in 1711, the Advice in 1712 and the Strafford in 1715. Another existing eight ships were rebuilt to the same specification – the Dragon in 1707, the Warwick and Bonaventure in 1711, the Assistance in 1713, the Worcester in 1714, and the Rochester, Panther and Dartmouth in 1716.

These vessels were initially armed as 54-gun ships to the 1703 Establishment of Guns (see table). Under the 1716 Establishment of Guns, they were re-classed as 50-gun ships with the following armament:

- Lower deck: 22 × 18 lb
- Upper deck: 22 × 9 lb
- Quarterdeck: 4 × 6 lb
- Forecastle: 2 × 6 lb

=== 40-gun fifth-rates ===
General characteristics For 40-gun fifth-rates
- Type: 40-gun fifth rate
- Tons burthen: 531 6/94 bm
- Length: 118 ft 0 in (36.0 m) (gundeck); 97 ft 6 in (29.7 m) (keel)
- Beam: 32 ft 0 in (9.8 m)
- Depth of hold: 13 ft 6 in (4.1 m)
- Sail plan: Full-rigged ship
- Complement: 190 officers and men (130 in peacetime)
- Armament: 42 guns (1703 Establishment): Lower deck: 18 × 9 lb; Upper deck: 20 × 6 lb; Quarterdeck: 4 × 6 lb; Forecastle: nil

Fifteen 42-gun ships were newbuilt to the dimensions of the 1706 Establishment – the Ludlow Castle, Gosport, Portsmouth and Hastings launched in 1707, the Pearl, Mary Galley, Sapphire and Southsea Castle in 1708, the Enterprise, Adventure and Fowey in 1709, Charles Galley in 1710, Launceston in 1711, Faversham in 1712 and Lynn in 1715. Two similar ships were built on speculation by the contractor William Johnson at Blackwall and purchased by the Navy Board – the Looe in 1707 and Diamond in 1708. A further 40-gun ship was also built nominally to the same specification – the Royal Anne Galley of 1709 – but she emerged longer and leaner than the others.

The ships were initially armed to the 1703 Establishment of Guns (see table to right). Under the 1716 Gun Establishment, they became 40-gun ships, with an armament as follows:

- Lower deck: 20 × 12 lb
- Upper deck: 20 × 6 lb
- Quarterdeck: nil
- Forecastle: nil

=== 30-gun fifth-rates ===
While no formal set of recommendations for 30-gun ships was produced by the Navy Board in the 1706 Establishment, a de facto set of dimensions was adopted, which were used for the construction of two new 32-gun fifth-rates (Sweepstakes in 1708 and Scarborough in 1711), while the Bedford Galley was rebuilt to slightly smaller dimensions in 1709:

- Tons burthen: 416 17/94 bm
- Length:
  - 108 ft 0 in (32.9 m) (gundeck)
  - 90 ft 0 in (27.4 m) (keel)
- Beam: 29 ft 6 in (9.0 m)
- Hold depth: 12 ft 0 in (3.7 m)
- Complement: 145 officers and men (110 in peacetime)
- Armament: 32 guns (1703 Establishment)
  - Lower deck: 4 × 9 lb
  - Upper deck: 22 × 6 lb
  - Quarterdeck: 6 × 4 lb
  - Forecastle: nil

The 1716 Establishment of Guns altered their armament to 30 guns:

- Lower deck: 8 × 9 lb
- Upper deck: 20 × 6 lb
- Quarterdeck: 2 × 4 lb
- Forecastle: nil
