= Battle of Málaga =

Battle of Málaga or Siege of Málaga may refer to:

- Siege of Málaga (1065-1066), military conflict between the Taifa of Seville and the Taifa of Granada
- Siege of Málaga (1487), a siege by Castile and Aragon during the Granada War
- Battle of Málaga (1704), a naval battle in the War of the Spanish Succession
- Battle of Málaga (1937), a battle in the Spanish Civil War
