= Scilly naval disaster of 1707 =

Royal Navy ship loss in storm

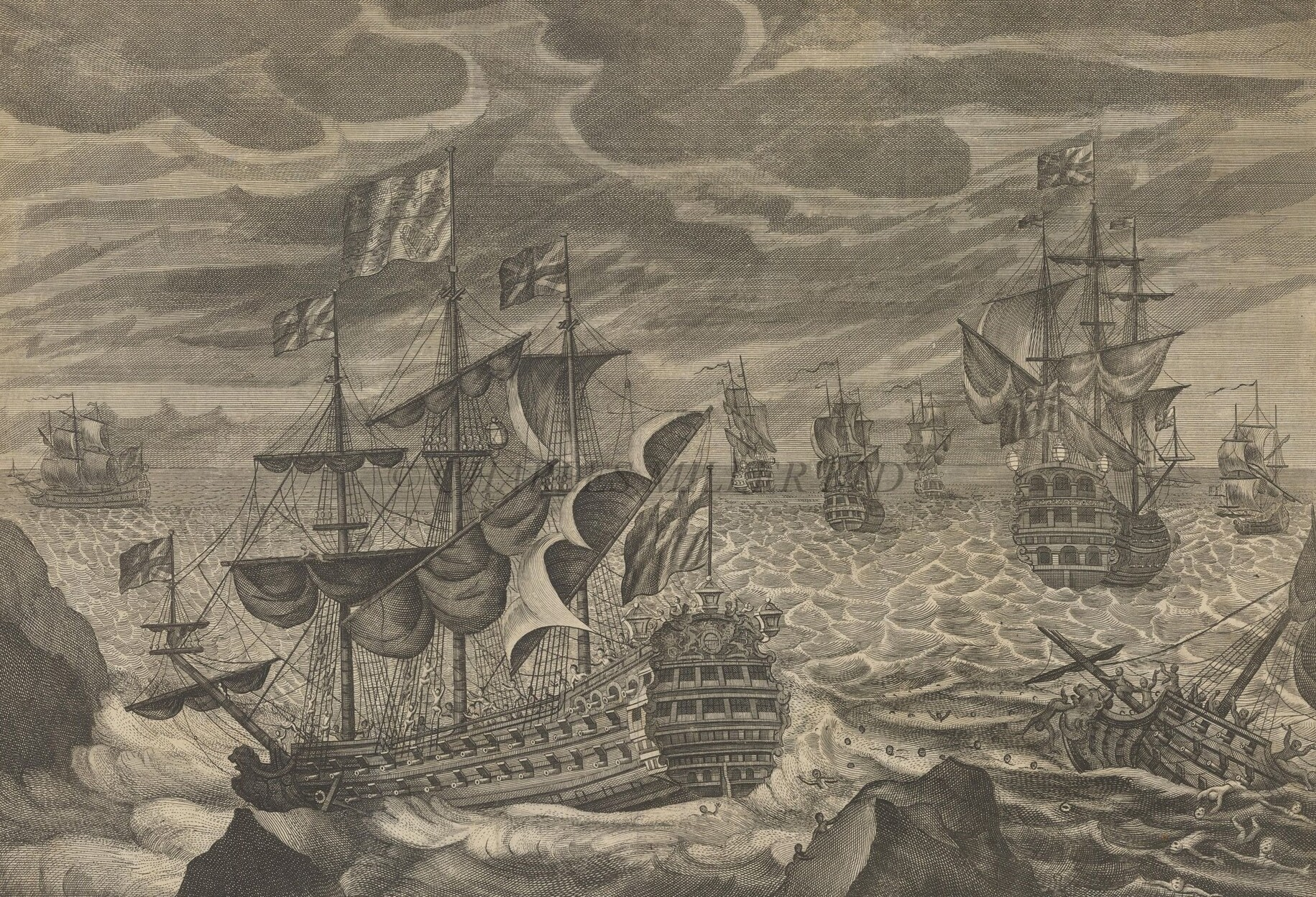
- c. 1739 engraving of the disaster, with HMS Association in the centre

Occurrence
- Date: 22 October 1707 (Note: The date of 22 October is reckoned according to the Julian calendar, still in use in 1707; in the Gregorian calendar, the date would be reckoned as 2 November.)
- Summary: Navigation accident
- Site: Isles of Scilly, Cornwall, England, Great Britain; 49°51′56″N 6°23′50″W
- Operator: Royal Navy
- Destination: Portsmouth, England
- Fatalities: 1,400–2,000
- Injuries: 13
- Survivors: 13

The Scilly naval disaster of 1707 was the loss of four warships of a Royal Navy fleet off the Isles of Scilly near the British mainland when they struck rocks on 22 October 1707. Between 1,400 and 2,000 sailors lost their lives aboard the wrecked vessels, making the incident one of the worst maritime disasters in British naval history. The disaster has been attributed to a combination of factors, including navigators' inability to accurately calculate their positions, errors in the available charts and pilot books, and inadequate compasses.

== Background ==
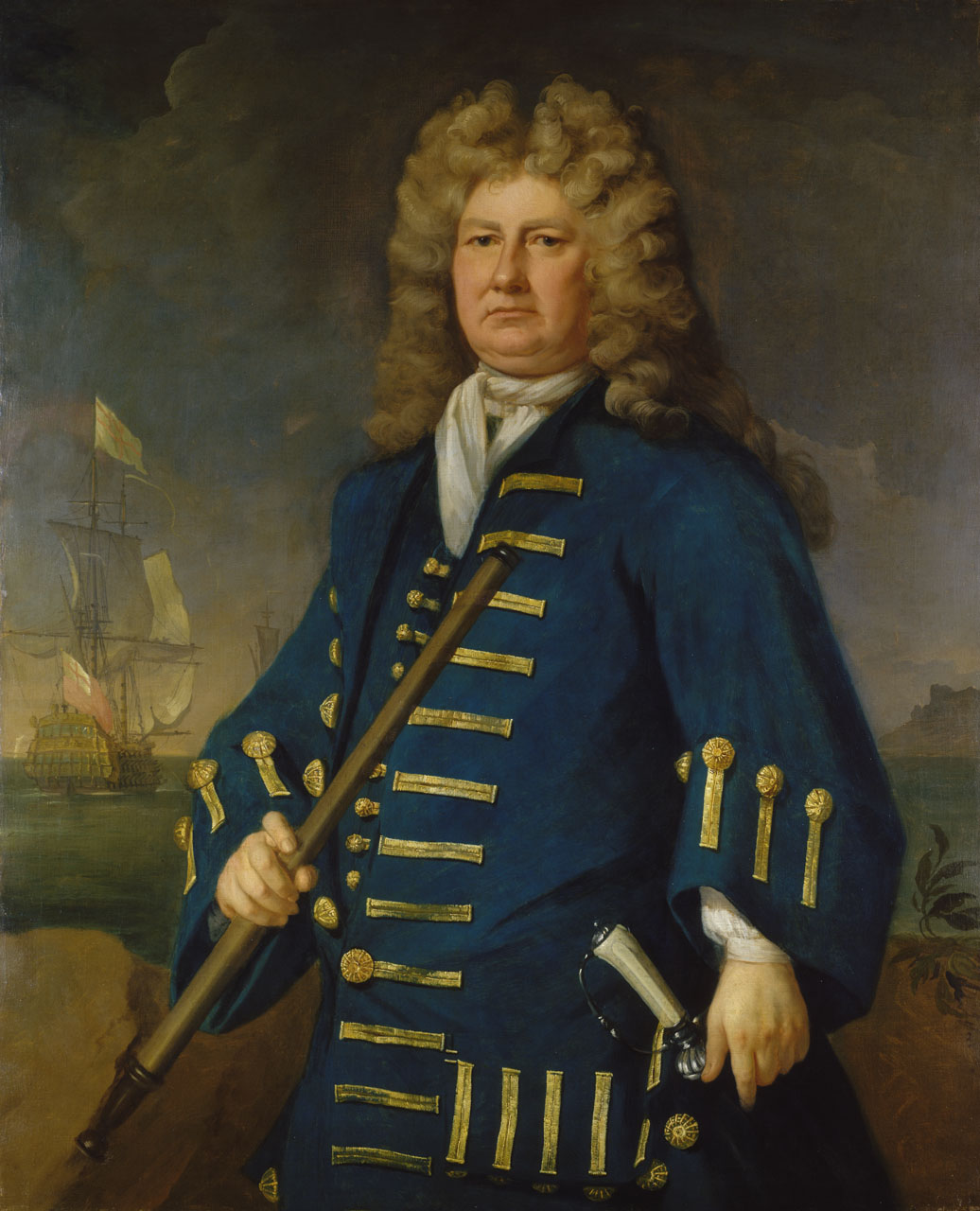
Portrait of Sir Cloudesley Shovell by Michael Dahl

From 29 July to 21 August 1707, during the War of the Spanish Succession, a combined British, Austrian and Dutch force under the command of Prince Eugene of Savoy besieged the French port of Toulon. Great Britain dispatched a fleet to provide naval support, led by the Commander-in-Chief of the British Fleets, Sir Cloudesley Shovell. The ships sailed to the Mediterranean, attacked Toulon and managed to inflict damage on the French fleet caught in the siege.

However, the overall campaign was unsuccessful, and the British fleet was ordered to return home, setting sail from Gibraltar for Portsmouth in late September. The force under Shovell's command comprised fifteen ships of the line (Association, Royal Anne, Torbay, St George, Cruizer, Eagle, Lenox, Monmouth, Orford, Panther, Romney, HMS Rye, Somerset, Swiftsure, Valeur) as well as four fireships (Firebrand, HMS Griffin, Phoenix, HMS Vulcan), the sloop HMS Weazel and the yacht HMS Isabella.

== Loss of the ships ==
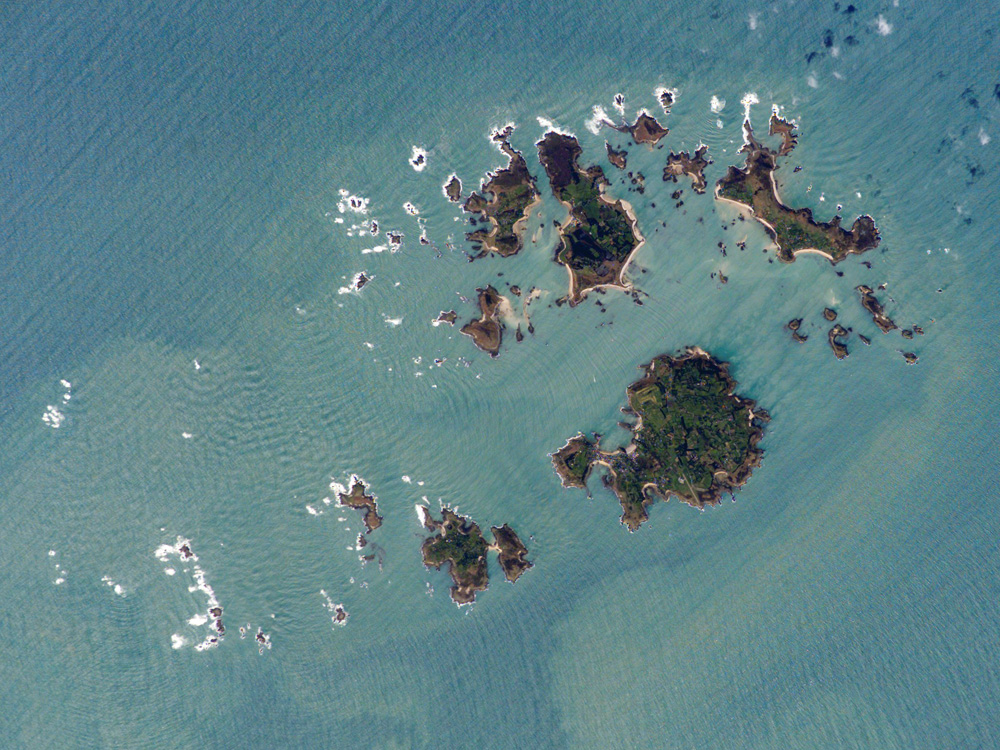
The Isles of Scilly. The Western Rocks, Crim Rocks and Bishop Rock all are in the lower left of this image.

Shovell's fleet of twenty-one ships left Gibraltar on 29 September, with HMS Association serving as his own flagship, HMS Royal Anne as flagship of Vice-Admiral of the Blue Sir George Byng and HMS Torbay as flagship of Rear-Admiral of the Blue Sir John Norris. The passage was marked by extremely bad weather and constant squalls and westerly gales. As the fleet sailed out on the Atlantic, passing the Bay of Biscay on their way to England, the weather worsened, and on most days it was impossible to take the observations needed to determine their latitude. On 21 October they came into the soundings, with depths of 93–130 fathoms (about 170–240 metres), indicating that they were coming onto the edge of the continental shelf. At noon that day the weather cleared and good readings of latitude were obtained, at 48° 50–57' N. Taken together these observations suggested a location about 200 miles west-southwest of Scilly. This was the last observation of latitude, and the rest of the voyage relied on dead reckoning.

Due to the known difficulties of long-distance navigation, it was common practice at the time to send out a frigate to look for a returning fleet, in order to help guide the fleet safely to port. HMS Tartar was sent out from Plymouth on 21 October, but returned on 24 October without finding Shovell's fleet.

Early on 21 October, the wind had backed from north to southwest, giving the fleet a favourable wind, sailing east-northeast. At 11 am, three ships were detached to head to Falmouth on convoy duty. At 4 pm on 22 October, the fleet hove-to and again took soundings. The wind continued to be favourable, though visibility was poor and night was approaching. Presumably believing that the channel was open, Shovell gave the order to sail on, at about 6 pm. The fleet headed east-by-north until at about 8 pm the flagship and several other vessels found themselves among the rocks to the southwest of St Agnes Island in the Isles of Scilly. Four ships were lost when they struck the rocks:

- HMS Association, a 90-gun second-rate ship of the line commanded by Captain Edmund Loades, struck the Outer Gilstone Rock off Scilly's Western Rocks at 8 pm and sank, with the loss of her entire crew of about 800 men and Admiral Shovell himself. Following behind Association was St George, whose crew saw the flagship go down in three or four minutes. St George also struck rocks and suffered damage but eventually managed to get off, as did HMS Phoenix, which ran ashore between Tresco and St Martin's but could be kept seaworthy.
- HMS Eagle, a 70-gun third-rate ship of the line commanded by Captain Robert Hancock, hit the Crim Rocks and was lost with all hands on Tearing Ledge amongst the Western Rocks. It is estimated that HMS Eagle had at least as many crew as HMS Association. Sinking a few hundred metres away from Bishop Rock, her wreck lies at a depth of 130 ft (40 m).
- HMS Romney, a 50-gun fourth-rate ship of the line commanded by Captain William Coney, hit Bishop Rock and went down with all save one of her 290 crew being lost. The sole survivor was George Lawrence, who had worked as a butcher before joining the crew of Romney as quartermaster.
- HMS Firebrand, a fireship commanded by Captain Francis Percy, struck Outer Gilstone Rock like Association, but unlike the flagship she was lifted off by a wave. Percy managed to steer his badly damaged ship along the southern side of the Western Rocks between St Agnes and Annet, but she foundered in Smith Sound, sinking close to Menglow Rock, with the loss of 28 of her crew of 40. (It is also reported the survivors numbered 23).

Of the other ships in the fleet, HMS Royal Anne was saved from foundering by her crew quickly setting her topsails, and weathering the rocks when within a ship's length of them.

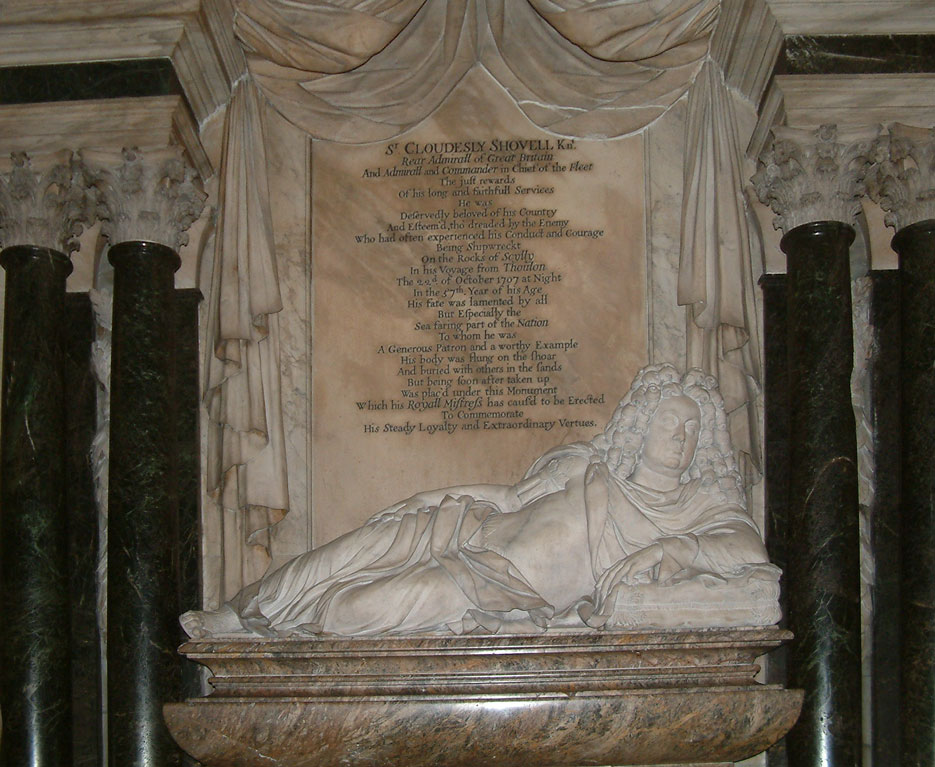
Sir Cloudesley Shovell's monument in Westminster Abbey, by Grinling Gibbons

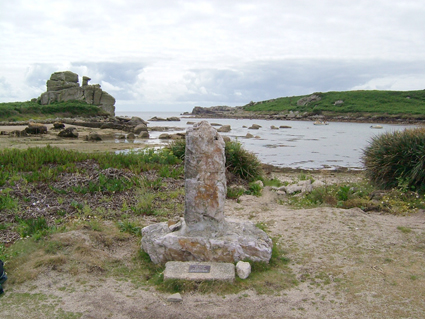
Shovell's memorial at Porthellick Cove

The exact number of officers, sailors and marines who died in the sinking of the four ships is unknown. Statements vary from 1,400 to over 2,000, making it one of the greatest maritime disasters in British history. For days afterwards, bodies continued to wash onto the shores of the isles along with the wreckage of the warships and personal effects. Many dead sailors from the wrecks were buried on the island of St Agnes. Admiral Shovell's body, along with those of his two Narborough stepsons and his flag-captain, Edmund Loades, washed up on Porthellick Cove on St Mary's the following day, almost seven miles (11 km) from where Association was wrecked. A small memorial was later erected at this site. The circumstances under which the admiral's remains were found gave rise to stories (see below). Shovell was temporarily buried on the beach on St Mary's. By order of Queen Anne, his body was later exhumed, embalmed and taken to London, where he was interred in Westminster Abbey. His large marble monument in the south choir aisle was sculpted by Grinling Gibbons. There is a memorial depicting the sinking of Association in the church at the Narboroughs' home of Knowlton near Dover.

== Legacy ==
=== Legends ===
A number of myths and legends have arisen concerning the disaster. A story claiming that Shovell summoned the sailing masters to the flagship on 22 October for a council regarding the fleet's position seems to have first appeared in a paper by James Herbert Cooke presented at a meeting of the Society of Antiquaries in 1883, based on an account by Edmund Herbert, who was on the Isles of Scilly in 1709. Although such a council having occurred is not in itself improbable, it would have been a significant operation, involving the launching of the ships' boats in heavy weather, and it would be expected to have been recorded in the ships' logs. The surviving logs do indeed record previous such events, but no mention is made of a council on the 22nd.

Another myth associated with the disaster alleges that a common sailor on the flagship tried to warn Shovell that the fleet was off course but the Admiral had him hanged at the yardarm for inciting mutiny. The story first appeared in the Scilly Isles in 1780, with the common sailor being a Scilly native who recognised the waters as being close to home but was punished for warning the Admiral. It was claimed that grass will never grow on the grave where Shovell was first buried at Porthellick Cove because of his tyrannical act against an islander. The myth was embellished in the 19th century when the punishment became instant execution and the sailor's knowledge of the fleet's position was attributed to superior navigational skills instead of local knowledge. While it is possible that a sailor may have debated the vessel's location and feared for its fate, such debates were common upon entering the English Channel, as noted by Samuel Pepys in 1684. Naval historians have repeatedly discredited the story, noting the lack of any evidence in contemporary documents, its fanciful stock conventions and dubious origins. However, the myth was revived in 1997 when author Dava Sobel presented it as an unqualified truth in her book Longitude.

Another story that is often told is that Shovell was alive, at least barely, when he reached the shore of Scilly at Porthellick Cove, but was murdered by a woman for the sake of his priceless emerald ring, which had been given to him by a close friend, Captain James Lord Dursley. At that time, the Scillies had a wild and lawless reputation. According to a letter written in 1709 by Edmund Herbert, who was sent to Scilly by Shovell's family to help locate and recover items belonging to the admiral, Sir Cloudesley's body was first found by two women "stript of his shirt" and "his ring was also lost off his hand, which however left ye impression on his finger." Shovell's widow, Elizabeth, had offered a large reward for the recovery of any family property. It is claimed that the murder only came to light some thirty years later when the woman, on her deathbed, produced the stolen ring and confessed to a clergyman that she had killed the admiral. The clergyman supposedly sent it back to the 3rd Earl of Berkeley, although several historians doubt the murder legend as there is no record of the ring's return and the story stems from a romantic and unverifiable "deathbed confession".

=== Maritime navigation ===
There was much discussion of the difficulties facing mariners approaching the channel in the years both before and after the Scilly disaster. In 1700, Edmond Halley published an "advertisement" (warning) concerning the dangers of ships mistakenly passing north of Scilly, rather than to the south, as intended, which he described as "not without great danger, and the loss of many of them". He identified two factors responsible for the mistakes: the failure to take account of magnetic variation, then about 7° west, and errors in the pilot books, which placed the islands up to 15 mi (24 km) north of their true position. He recommended a course not more northerly than 49° 40' to stay safely to the south of both the Scillies and the Lizard.

Writing about the Scilly disaster in 1720, Josiah Burchett wrote: "I cannot but have a lively idea of the danger fleets are exposed to upon entering the British Channel, when coming from foreign parts, but more especially when their officers have not the advantage of knowing their latitude by a good observation". Thus both these writers identified the importance of errors in latitude.

Another possible factor, suspected by some mariners at the time but not documented for nearly another 100 years, was the existence of a north-setting current, Rennell's Current, that could run at 15 mi (24 km) in 24 hours, quite sufficient to put a ship into danger. The current builds up with strong westerly or southwesterly winds, as was the case in October 1707.

Longitude was also important for a ship approaching the channel. Before astronomical methods of determining longitude became available, navigators relied upon soundings of the ocean depth with lead and line. The continental shelf extends to about the 100-fathom (180 m) line and then drops very sharply to thousands of metres. A ship coming "into the soundings", where the depth could be measured with a 100–150 fathoms (180–270 m) sounding line thus knew its approximate longitude.

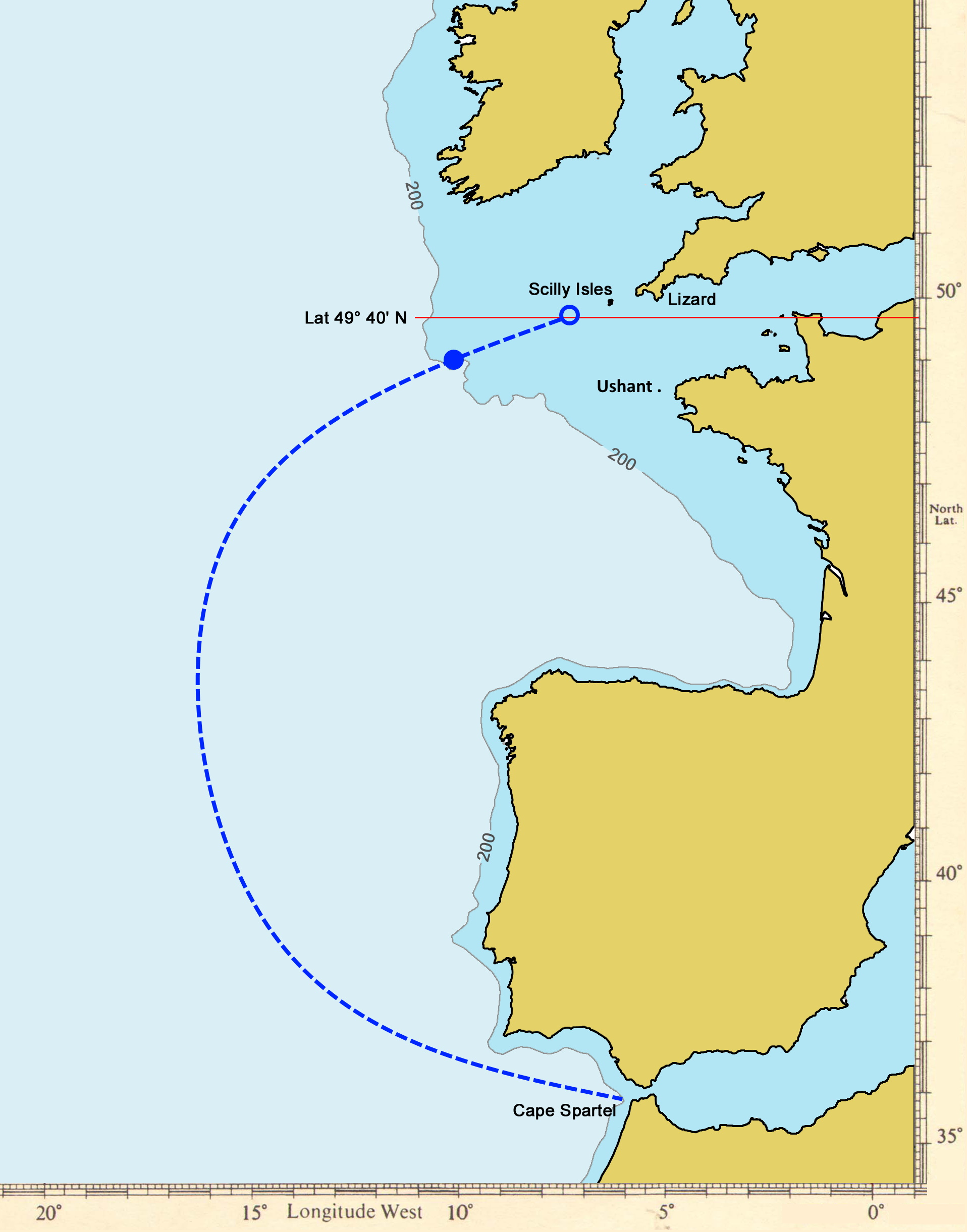
The dashed blue line shows the approximate route of Shovell's fleet from Cape Spartel to the Isles of Scilly in October 1707. The filled circle shows the estimated position on 21 October, based on observations of latitude and soundings. The open circle shows the dead reckoning position of Orford when it hove to on 22 October, with the rest of the fleet, before they set off on the fatal last stage of the voyage. The red horizontal line shows the latitude recommended by Edmond Halley as a safe northern limit for entering the channel.

The information available to the fleet has been analysed using data from the numerous log books of the surviving ships. It has sometimes been assumed that the bad weather on the voyage entirely prevented the determination of latitude, but the weather in fact cleared enough for at least a few observations to be made. Thus the positions calculated were a mixture of dead reckoning, soundings, and observations of latitude. The approximate course of the fleet is shown on the chart, with positions shown for the last two days from the logs of ships that survived the disaster. The chart also shows Halley's recommended northern limit. The fleet was clearly too far north to continue heading east-by-north, which again suggests an error in latitude. W.E. May notes that while the latitudes recorded in the log-books were more accurate than the longitudes, there was still a spread of over 40 nautical miles (74 km; 46 mi) in the recorded latitudes.

HMS Orford, and Lieutenant Lochard's log, survived the disaster. HMS Association and her logs did not, so there is no way of knowing exactly what information Shovell had available to him. The account of a council of the ships' masters that discussed their position is almost certainly one of the myths of the disaster, as suggested above. But if Shovell headed east-by-north towards the Channel at nighttime, he presumably believed he was safely to the south of the Scillies. The captain of Torbay wrote in his journal: "We were much to ye Northward of what was expected, and likewise more to the Eastward". May considers the error to have been one of latitude, but due more to the inaccuracy of the charts than to the ships' observations.

While Dava Sobel's assertion that the disaster was mainly due to an error in longitude cannot be sustained, the disastrous wrecking of a Royal Navy fleet in home waters nonetheless caused great consternation to the nation, and made plainly evident the inadequacy of existing maritime navigational techniques. The Royal Navy conducted a court-martial of the officers of Firebrand (a pro forma investigation required after the sinking or wrecking of any Royal Navy ship) and all were acquitted, but no officers survived from the other lost ships, so no other courts-martial took place. The Navy also conducted a survey of compasses from the surviving ships and of those at Chatham and Portsmouth dockyards, following comments from Sir William Jumper, captain of Lenox, that errors in the compasses had caused the navigational errors. The survey showed what a poor state many of the compasses were in; at Portsmouth, for example, only four of the 112 wooden-cased compasses from nine of the returning vessels were found to be serviceable.

Clearly, improvements were urgently needed before ships could be expected to safely find their way through dangerous waters. As transoceanic travel grew in significance, so did the importance of reliable navigation. While no contemporary discussions are known that appear to relate the disaster specifically to the longitude problem, the scale of the disaster may have contributed to concern about the problem in general, which ultimately led to the Longitude Act in 1714. The Act established the Board of Longitude and offered large financial rewards to anyone who could devise a method for accurately determining longitude at sea. After many years, the consequence of the Act was that accurate marine chronometers were produced and the lunar distance method was developed, both of which were quickly adopted worldwide for maritime navigation.

== Discovery of the wrecks ==
The ships of Sir Cloudesley Shovell's fleet lay undisturbed on the seabed for over 250 years, despite several salvage attempts in pursuit of the flagship's cargo of valuable coins, spoils of war from several battles, weapons, and personal effects. In June 1967, the Royal Navy minesweeper HMS Puttenham, manned with twelve divers under the command of Engineer-Lieutenant Roy Graham, sailed to the Isles of Scilly and dropped anchor off Gilstone Ledge, just to the southeast of Bishop Rock and close to the Western Rocks. The year before, Graham and other specialists from the Naval Air Command Sub Aqua Club had dived in this area on a first attempt to find Association. He recalled some years later: "The weather was so bad, all we achieved was the sight of a blur of seaweed, seals and white water as we were swept through the Gilstone Reef and fortunately out the other side." On their second attempt in summer 1967, using the minesweeper and supported by the Royal Navy Auxiliary Service, Graham and his men finally managed to locate the remains of Admiral Shovell's flagship on the Gilstone Ledge. Parts of the wreck are in 10 m (30 ft) while others can be found at between 30 m (90 ft) and 40 m (120 ft) as the sea floor falls away from the reef. The divers first discovered a cannon, and on the third dive silver and gold coins were spotted underneath that cannon. The Ministry of Defence initially suppressed news of the discovery for fear of attracting treasure hunters, but word was soon out and excited huge national interest. As the Isles of Scilly are traditionally administered as part of the Duchy of Cornwall, the Duke of Cornwall also has right of wreck on all ships wrecked on the Scilly archipelago. More than 2,000 coins and other artefacts were finally recovered from the wreck site and auctioned by Sotheby's in July 1969. A further sale at Sotheby's in January 1970, by order of the Isles of Scilly Wrecks Receiver, made £10,175. Among the goods sold was Shovell's chamber pot for £270. A battered dining plate, which had been discovered during a dive in 1968, brought £2,100. The rediscovery of Association by naval divers and the finding of so many historical artefacts in her wreck also led to more government legislation, notably the Protection of Wrecks Act 1973, passed in an attempt to preserve British historic wreck sites as part of the maritime heritage.

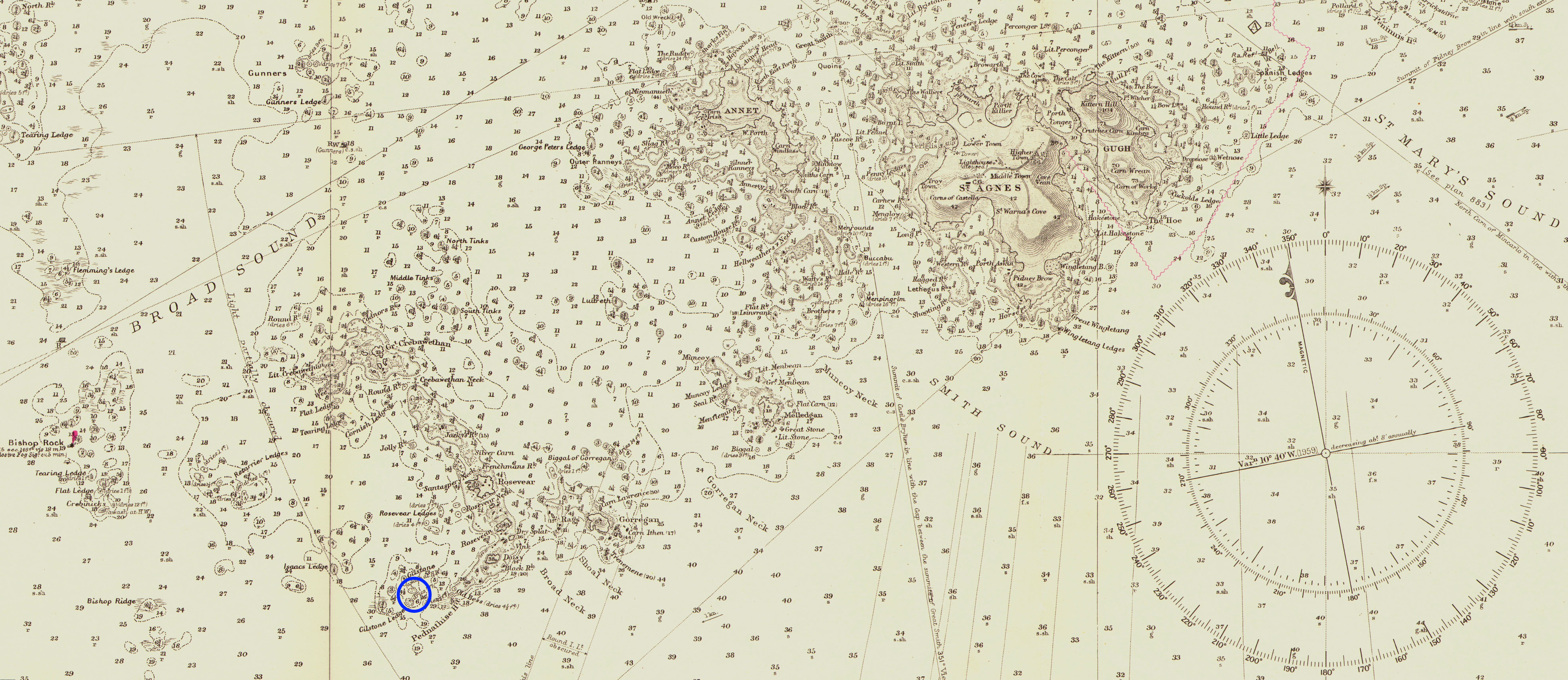
Section of Admiralty Chart No 34 showing the location of the HMS Association wreck on the Gilstone Rock

The wreck of Firebrand was discovered in 1982, and several items were recovered, including guns and anchors, a wooden nocturne (for determining the time at night), a bell and carved cherubs.

Today photographs of the original diving expedition are on display at the Old Wesleyan Chapel in St. Mary's, of the team leader Lt Graham and a naval doctor examining human bones from the wreck of Association, alongside the ship's bell of Firebrand with "1692" engraved on it, and many more artefacts. In 2007, the three-hundredth anniversary of the disaster and its consequences were commemorated on the Isles of Scilly with a series of special events, organised by the Council of the Isles of Scilly in partnership with the local AONB office, English Heritage, the Isles of Scilly Museum in Hugh Town, and Natural England.

== In popular culture ==
The disaster is featured at the start of the 2000 television drama Longitude, which is based on Sobel's book of the same name.

== See also ==
- List of disasters in Great Britain and Ireland by death toll
- List of shipwrecks of the Isles of Scilly
- Honda Point disaster
