= Longitude Prize =

2014 British inducement prize contest

- Sponsored by: NESTA; Technology Strategy Board; BBC
- Reward: £10 million
- Website: www.longitudeprize.org

The Longitude Prize is an inducement prize contest offered by Challenge Works, a social enterprise which was historically part of Nesta, a British lottery funded charity, in the spirit of the 18th-century Longitude rewards. It runs a £10 million prize fund, offering an £8 million payout to the team of researchers that develops an affordable, accurate, and fast point of care test for bacterial infection that is easy to use anywhere in the world. Such a test will allow the conservation of antibiotics for future generations and help solve the global problem of antimicrobial resistance.

The prize was announced by the prime minister of the United Kingdom, David Cameron in 2013, and a shortlist of six challenges to be put to a public vote was announced at the BBC's Broadcasting House in May 2014.

== Longitude Committee ==
A committee chaired by Lord Martin Rees, the Astronomer Royal, chose the six challenges that were to be put to a public vote, and subsequently decided the format of the prize and the specific challenges that must be met to win. The other committee members are:

- Gisela Abbam, Chair, British Science Association
- Professor Rifat Atun, Professor of Global Health Systems, Harvard School of Public Health
- Andrew Cohen, Head of BBC Science Unit
- Professor Dame Sally Davies, Chief Medical Officer for England
- Professor David Delpy, Chair, Strategic Advisory Board, UK National Quantum Technologies Programme and Emeritus Professor of Biomedical Optics, UCL
- Andrew Dunnett, Director of the Vodafone Foundation
- Ravi Gurumurthy, Chief Executive Officer, Nesta
- Professor Dame Wendy Hall, Professor of Computer Science at the University of Southampton
- Roger Highfield, Director of External Affairs, Science Museum, London
- Dr Tim Jinks, Head of Drug-Resistant Infections Priority Programme, Wellcome Trust
- Fiona Carragher, Director of Research & Influencing, Alzheimer's Society
- Dame Angela McLean, Government Chief Scientific Adviser
- Dr Stella Peace, Executive Director Healthy Living and Agriculture at Innovate UK

== AMR Prize Advisory Panel ==
The members of the AMR Prize Advisory Panel are:

- Professor Till Bachmann, Professor of Molecular Diagnostics and Infection, University of Edinburgh
- Doris-Ann Williams, MBE, Chief Executive, BIVDA
- Professor Chris Butler (Chair), Professor of Primary Care Health Sciences, University of Oxford
- Dr. Paul Chapman, Partner, Marks & Clerk LLP
- Dr. Abdul Ghafur, Coordinator, "Chennai Declaration"
- Dr. Patrick SM Dunlop, Lecturer, Ulster University
- Martin Kiernan, Research Fellow at the Richard Wells Research Centre
- Professor Rosanna Peeling, Professor and Chair of Diagnostics Research, London School of Hygiene and Tropical Medicine
- Professor Lucy Yardley, Director CAHP, University of Southampton
- Professor Matthew Thompson, Professor of Family Medicine, Vice Chair for Research, University of Washington
- Professor Helen Lambert, Professor of Medical Anthropology, University of Bristol
- Betsy Wonderly Trainor, Diagnostics Alliance Director, CARB-X team
- Dr. Direk Limmathurotsakul, Head of Microbiology, Mahidol-Oxford Tropical Medicine Research Unit
- Dr. Tom Boyles, Infectious Diseases Clinician
- Hassan Sefrioui, Director and Member of the Executive Board at Moroccan Foundation for Advanced Science, Innovation and Research
- Dr. Jane Cunningham, Consultant in Infectious Diseases and Microbiology, Diagnostics Advisor, Médecins Sans Frontières
- Dr. Penny Wilson, Deputy Director, Innovative Devices MHRA

== Public vote ==
The choice of challenges for the Prize was presented on an episode of the BBC science programme Horizon, with a poll opened to the public afterwards. The options were:

- Flight - How can we fly without damaging the environment? Design and build an aeroplane that is as close to zero carbon as possible and capable of flying from London to Edinburgh.
- Food - How can we ensure everyone has nutritious sustainable food? The next big food innovation.
- Antibiotics - How can we prevent the rise of resistance to antibiotics? Create a cost-effective, accurate, easy to use test for bacterial infections.
- Paralysis - How can we restore movement to those with paralysis? Give paralysed people the freedom of movement most of us enjoy.
- Water - How can we ensure everyone has access to safe and clean water? Create a cheap, environmentally sustainable desalination technology.
- Dementia - How can we help people with dementia live independently for longer? Develop intelligent, affordable technologies to help independence.

The winner, antibiotics, was announced on The One Show on BBC 1 on 25 June. The committee issued a draft of the criteria with a two-week opportunity for open review, which finished 10 August 2014.

The vote was urged and welcomed by the Biochemical Society and Jamie Reed, the Shadow Minister for Health at the time and chair of the All Party Parliamentary Group on Antibiotics (APPG-A), who said "The scale of the challenge that antimicrobial resistance presents is beyond any doubt and new innovative thinking is essential."

== Seed funding ==
Since the announcement of the Longitude Prize, the foundation has selected thirteen organizations for seed funding between £10,000 and £25,000 to go toward their research. Called Discovery Awards, there have been three rounds of these grants.

== Second Prize Announced ==
The Longitude Prize on Dementia was announced in 2022, with the Discovery Awards being made between June 2023 and May 2024.

== First Prize Awarded ==
The first prize of £8m was awarded to Sysmex Astrego on 12 June 2024 for an antibiotic susceptibility test for urinary tract infection based on an invention from Uppsala University.
