= HMS Association =

Ship of the line of the Royal Navy

Coordinates: 49°51′44″N 6°24′30″W

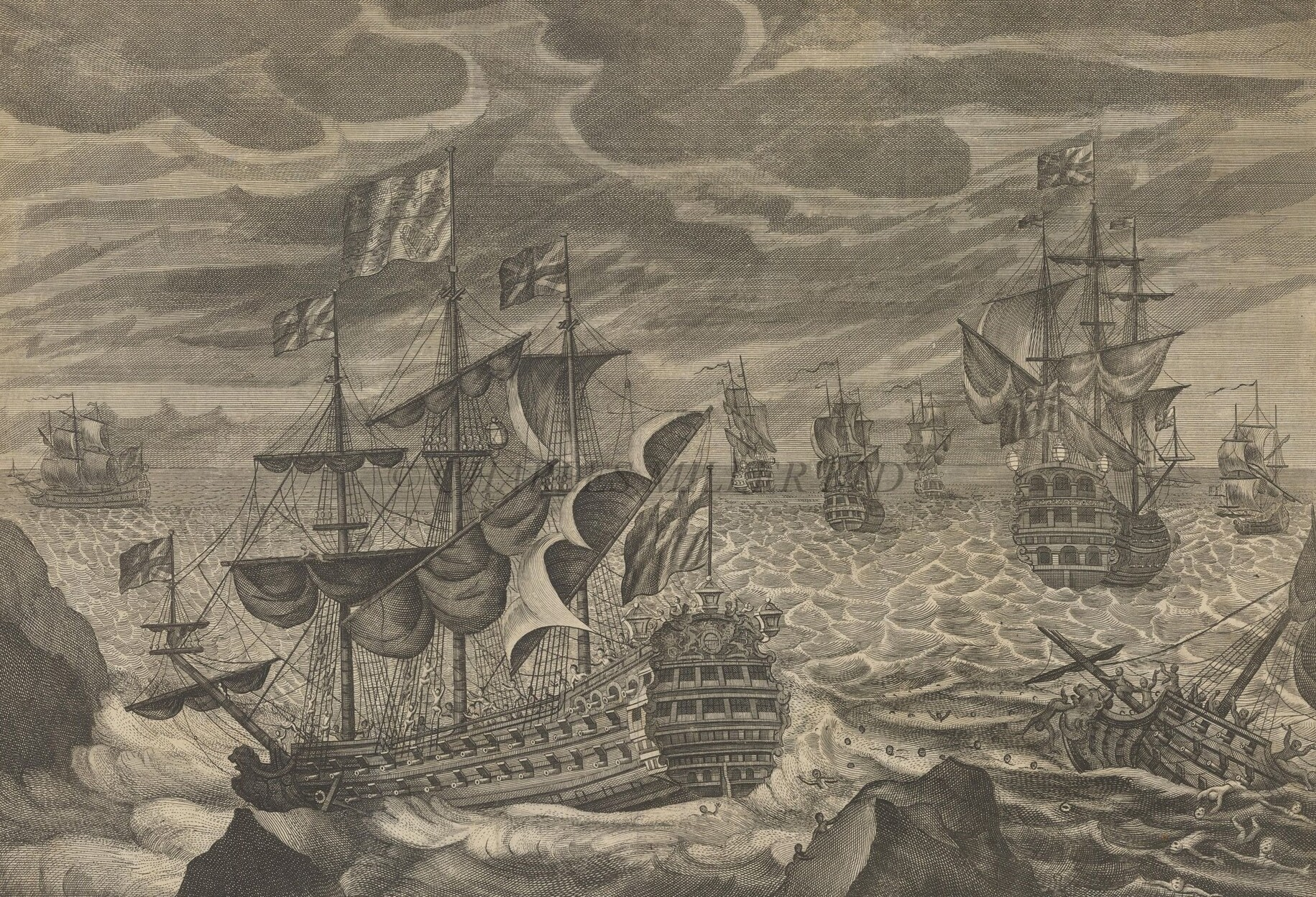
- c. 1739 engraving of the Scilly naval disaster of 1707, with Association in the centre

History

Great Britain
- Name: Association
- Ordered: 20 December 1694
- Builder: Bagwell, Portsmouth Dockyard
- Launched: 1 January 1697
- Commissioned: July 1697
- Fate: Wrecked, 22 October 1707 (OS)

General characteristics
- Class & type: 90-gun second-rate ship of the line
- Tons burthen: 1459 32/94bm
- Length: 165 ft (50.3 m) (gundeck)
- Beam: 45 ft 4 in (13.8 m)
- Depth of hold: 18 ft 3 in (5.6 m)
- Propulsion: Sails
- Sail plan: Full-rigged ship
- Complement: 800 officers and men (approx.)
- Armament: 22 demi-cannons; 30 culverins; 2 × 6-pdrs; 24 sakers; 2 × 3-pdrs

Association was a 90-gun second-rate ship of the line of the Royal Navy, launched at Portsmouth Dockyard in 1697. She served with distinction at the capture of Gibraltar, and was lost in 1707 by grounding on the Isles of Scilly in the greatest maritime disaster of the age. The wreck is a Protected Wreck managed by Historic England.

== Service ==
Association survived the Great Storm of 1703, during which she was at anchor off Harwich. Her rigging was cut away to avoid foundering on the "Galloper" sandbar, and she was blown to Gothenburg in Sweden before she could make her way back to England.

Association served as the flagship of Admiral Sir Cloudesley Shovell in the Mediterranean during the War of the Spanish Succession. Her engagements included the capture of Gibraltar on 21 July 1704, and the Battle of Toulon in summer 1707.

== Sinking ==
In October 1707, Association, commanded by Captain Edmund Loades and with Admiral Shovell on board, was returning from the Mediterranean after the Toulon campaign. The 21 ships in the squadron entered the mouth of the English Channel on the night of 22 October 1707 (Old style). At 8 pm, Association struck the Outer Gilstone Rock (see image) off the Isles of Scilly, and was wrecked with the loss of her entire crew of about 800 men. As a result of navigational errors, the ships were not where they were reckoned to be. Association was seen by those on board HMS St George to go down in three or four minutes' time. Among the dead were Captain Loades and Admiral Shovell, his stepsons Sir John Narborough and James Narborough (sons of Shovell's wife from her marriage to Rear Admiral Sir John Narbrough) as well as Henry Trelawney, second son of the Bishop of Winchester. Captain Loades was the son of Rear Admiral Narbrough's sister. Three other ships (HMS Eagle, HMS Romney and HMS Firebrand) were also lost, bringing the death toll to nearly 2,000. The Scilly naval disaster was one of the greatest maritime disasters in British history. It was largely as a result of this disaster that the Board of the Admiralty instituted a competition for a more precise method to determine longitude. There is a memorial depicting the sinking of the Association in the church at the Narboroughs' home of Knowlton near Dover.

== Discovery of the wreck ==
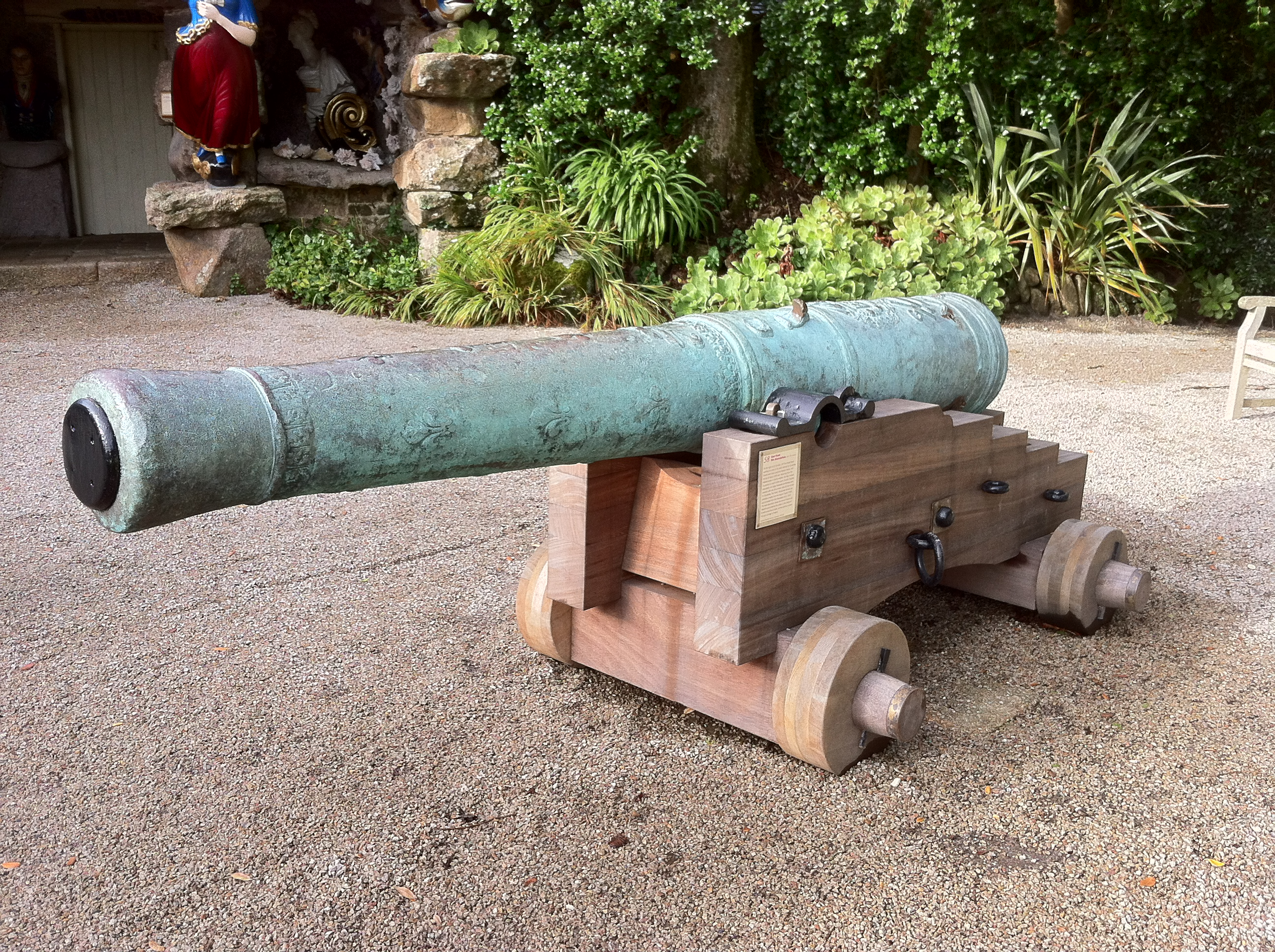
This French 18-pounder bronze gun, probably a trophy from the siege of Toulon (1707) was recovered from the Association site in 1970. The main decoration shows the arms of France and Navarre surrounded by the collars of the orders of St Michel and the St Esprit, surmounted by a crown. The gun carriage is modern. In the Valhalla Museum in Tresco Abbey Gardens, Isles of Scilly.

In June 1967, the minesweeper HMS Puttenham, equipped with twelve divers under the command of Engineer-Lieutenant Roy Graham, sailed to the Isles of Scilly and dropped anchor off Gilstone Ledge, just to the south-east of Bishop Rock and close to the Western Rocks. The year before, Graham and other specialists from the Naval Air Command Sub Aqua Club had dived in this area on a first attempt to find the Association. He recalled some years later: "The weather was so bad, all we achieved was the sight of a blur of seaweed, seals and white water as we were swept through the Gilstone Reef and fortunately out the other side." On their second attempt in summer 1967, using the minesweeper and supported by the Royal Navy Auxiliary Service, Graham and his men finally managed to locate the remains of Association on the Gilstone Ledge. Parts of the wreck are in 30 feet, while others can be found at between 90 and 120 feet as the sea floor falls away from the reef. The divers first discovered a cannon, and on the third dive, silver and gold coins were spotted underneath that cannon. The Ministry of Defence initially suppressed news of the discovery for fear of attracting treasure hunters, but word was soon out and excited huge national interest. More than 2,000 coins and other artefacts were finally recovered from the wreck site and auctioned by Sotheby's in July 1969. The rediscovery of the Association and the finding of so many historical artefacts in her wreck also led to more government legislation, notably the Protection of Wrecks Act 1973, passed in an attempt to preserve British historic wreck sites as part of the maritime heritage.

In 2017 Cornwall and Isles of Scilly Maritime Archaeology Society (CISMAS) undertook a survey of the site of the Association. A 3D site plan was produced for Historic England along with photos from the dive showing the difficult diving conditions.

== In fiction ==
In Robert Goddard's novel Name to a Face, a central plot element is the recovery of a ring worn by Admiral Shovell at the time of Association's sinking.
