= HMS Eagle (1679) =

Ship of the line of the Royal Navy

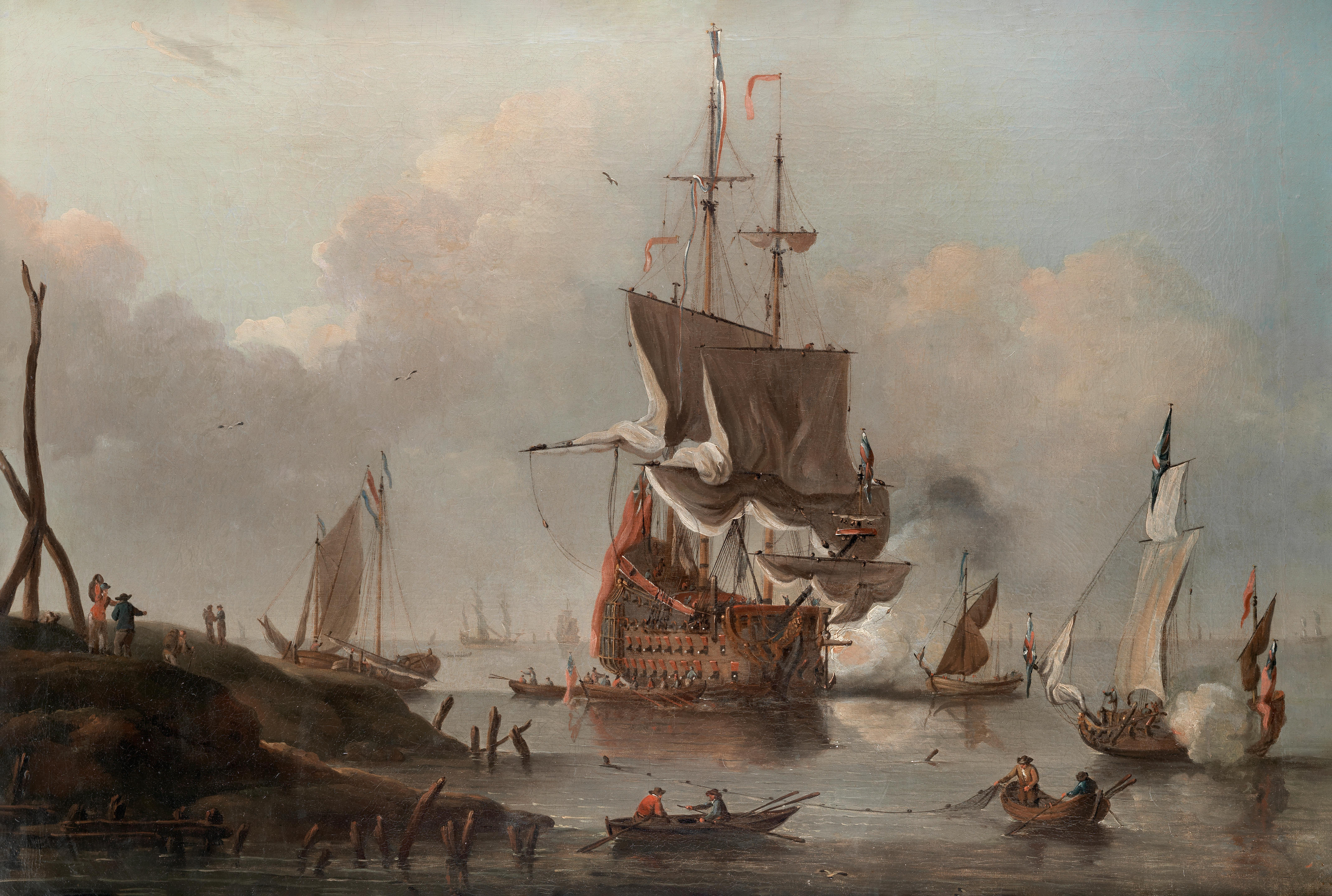
- Painting of Eagle making ready to sail from her offshore anchorage in the Nore by Peter Monamy

History

England
- Name: HMS Eagle
- Ordered: April 1677
- Builder: Furzer, Portsmouth Dockyard
- Launched: 31 January 1679
- Commissioned: 1690
- Honours and awards: Barfleur 1692; Gibraltar 1704; Velez Malaga 1704
- Fate: Wrecked and lost with all hands, Scilly Islands 22 October 1707

General characteristics as built
- Class & type: 70-gun third rate ship of the line
- Tons burthen: 105291/94 tons (bm)
- Length: 151 ft 6 in (46.18 m) gundeck; 120 ft 8 in (36.78 m) keel for tonnage
- Beam: 40 ft 6 in (12.34 m)
- Draught: 18 ft 0 in (5.5 m)
- Depth of hold: 17 ft 0 in (5.2 m)
- Propulsion: Sails
- Sail plan: Full-rigged ship
- Armament: 1685 Establishment 70/62 guns; 26 × demi-cannons (54 cwt – 9.5 ft (LD); 26 × demi-culverins (UD); 10 × sakers 16 cwt – 7 ft (QD); 4 × sakers 16 cwt – 7 ft (Fc); 5 × 5 3-pdr guns 5 cwt – 5 ft (RH)

General characteristics 1699 rebuild
- Class & type: 70-gun third rate ship of the line
- Tons burthen: 109955/94 tons (bm)
- Length: 156 ft 6 in (47.7 m) gundeck; 125 ft 0 in (38.1 m) keel for tonnage
- Beam: 40 ft 8 in (12.4 m)
- Depth of hold: 17 ft 3 in (5.3 m)
- Propulsion: Sails
- Sail plan: Full-rigged ship
- Armament: 1685 Establishment 70/62 guns; 26 × demi-cannons (54 cwt – 9.5 ft (LD); 26 × demi-culverins (UD); 10 × sakers 16 cwt – 7 ft (QD); 4 × sakers 16 cwt – 7 ft (Fc); 5 × 5 3-pdr guns 5 cwt – 5 ft (RH)

HMS Eagle was a 70-gun third-rate ship of the line of the Royal Navy built at Portsmouth Dockyard from 1677 to 1679. When completed she was placed in ordinary for a decade. Eagle was in active commission during the Nine Years' War, partaking in the action at Barfleur. She was rebuilt in 1699 at Chatham. Eagle again played an active role in the early part of the War of Spanish Succession, participating in the capture of Gibraltar and the Battle of Velez-Malaga. Eagle was wrecked off the Isles of Scilly in October 1707.

She was the seventh vessel to bear the name Eagle since it was used for a careening hulk, an ex-merchantman, purchased in 1592, and sold at Chatham in 1683. Eagle was awarded the Battle Honour Barfleur 1692, Gibraltar 1704, and Velez-Malaga 1704.

== Construction and specifications ==
She was ordered in April 1677 to be built at Portsmouth Dockyard under the guidance of Master Shipwright Daniel Furzer. She was launched on 31 January 1679. Her dimensions were a gundeck of 151 feet 6 inches (46.18 metres) with a keel of 120 feet 8 inches (36.78 metres) for tonnage calculation with a breadth of 151 feet 6 inches (46.18 metres) and a depth of hold of 17 ft 0 in (5.18 m). Her builder's measure tonnage was calculated as 105291/94 tons (bm). Her draught was 18 feet 0 inches (5.49 metres).

Her initial gun armament was in accordance with the 1677 Establishment with 72/60 guns consisting of twenty-six demi-cannons (54 cwt, 9.5 ft) on the lower deck, twenty-six 12-pounder guns (32 cwt, 9 ft) on the upper deck, ten sakers (16 cwt, 7 ft) on the quarterdeck and four sakers (16 cwt, 7 ft) on the foc's'le with four 3-pounder guns (5 cwt, 5 ft) on the poop deck or roundhouse. By 1688 she would carry 70 guns as per the 1685 Establishment . Her initial manning establishment would be for a crew of 460/380/300 personnel.

== Commissioned service ==
=== Service 1679 to 1699 ===
HMS Eagle was commissioned in 1690 under the command of Captain Stephen Myngs. In 1691 she was under command of Captain John Leake. She fought in the Battles off Cherbourg and La Hogue as the Flagship of Vice-Admiral George Rooke from 23 to 24 May 1692. Captain Richard Lestock was in command in 1693 into 1694 for service in the Mediterranean. In 1697 she was under the command of Captain Thomas Gardner patrolling off Dunkirk. She was paid off in May 1699. She would be rebuilt at Chatham in 1699.

=== Rebuild at Chatham Dockyard 1699 ===
She was ordered rebuilt at Chatham Dockyard under the guidance of Master Shipwright Daniel Furzer. She was launched/completed in 1699. Her dimensions were a gundeck of 156 feet 6 inches (47.70 metres) with a keel of 125 feet 0 inches (38.10 metres) for tonnage calculation with a breadth of 40 feet 8 inches (12.40 metres) and a depth of hold of 17 feet 3 inches (5.26 metres). Her builder's measure tonnage was calculated as 1,09955/94 tons (bm). She probably retained her armament as stated in the 1685 Establishment, though it is unclear if her armament was changed to the 1703 Establishment later. It is known that when completed her gun armament total at least 70 guns.

=== Service 1700 to 1707 ===
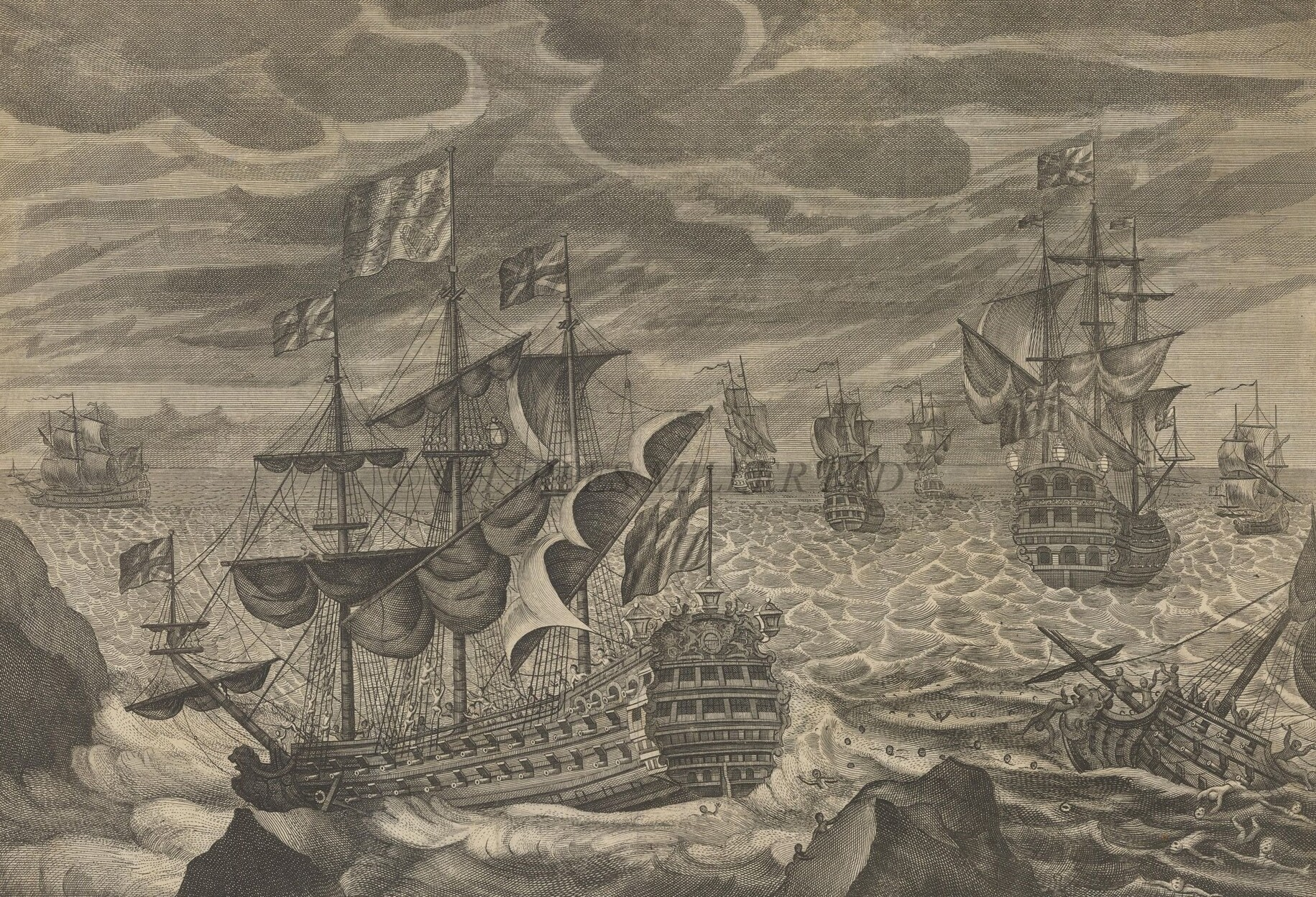
Sir Cloudesly Shovel in the Association with the Eagle, Rumney and the Firebrand, lost on the rocks of Scilly

HMS Eagle was commissioned in 1700 under the command of Captain William Kerr for Admiral Sir George Rooke's Fleet. The Fleet sailed to the Baltic Sea in 1701. In 1702 she came under Captain James Wishart assigned to Admiral Sir George Rooke's Squadron. . The Fleet departed Portsmouth on 19 July 1702 for the Soundings at the Scilly Islands. Finally departing for Cadiz, Spain on the 22nd arriving at the Bay of Bulls, north of Cadiz on 8 August. After some success and much indecision on how to proceed the troops were withdrawn on 15 September and the Fleet departed by the 19th.

On 21 September it was learned from a watering expedition to Lagos, Portugal, that the Spanish Treasure Fleet and its French escort was in the vicinity of Vigo Bay. The Fleet sailed North to engage these vessels. After a council of War on 11 October, it was decided that only 25 vessels would be selected to attack the enemy vessels. She was not selected for the battle and remained outside of the Bay of Vigo. All enemy vessels were either taken or destroyed and much treasure was taken. The Fleet returned to England. In 1703 she was under Captain Lord Archibald Hamilton until 1705. She sailed to the Mediterranean in September 1703 for service in Sir George Rooke's Fleet. She partook in the capture of Gibraltar on 23 July 1704. She was part of the force that was to bombard the town and the south bastion. Gibraltar surrendered on the 24th. On August 13, 1704, she fought in the Battle of Velez Malaga as a member of the Center Division, suffering 7 killed and 57 wounded. She withdrew from the fight early for want of shot.

In 1706 she was under Captain Robert Hancock until his death on 22 October 1707. At First she was sailing with Sir Stafford Fairborne's Squadron off Ostend. She sailed to the Mediterranean in September 1706. She was assigned to Sir Cloudisey Shovell's Fleet in the Mediterranean in 1707. In early October the Fleet sailed for the Scilly Islands.

== Loss ==
Under the command of Captain Robert Hancock, Eagle was lost with all hands off the Scilly Isles on 22 October 1707 when a disastrous navigational error sent Admiral Sir Cloudesley Shovell's fleet through dangerous reefs while on their way from Gibraltar to Portsmouth. Four ships (Eagle, Association, Firebrand and Romney) were lost, with nearly 2,000 sailors. The Scilly naval disaster was one of the greatest maritime disasters in British history. It was largely as a result of this disaster that the Board of the Admiralty instituted a competition for a more precise method to determine longitude.
