= HMS Firebrand (1694) =

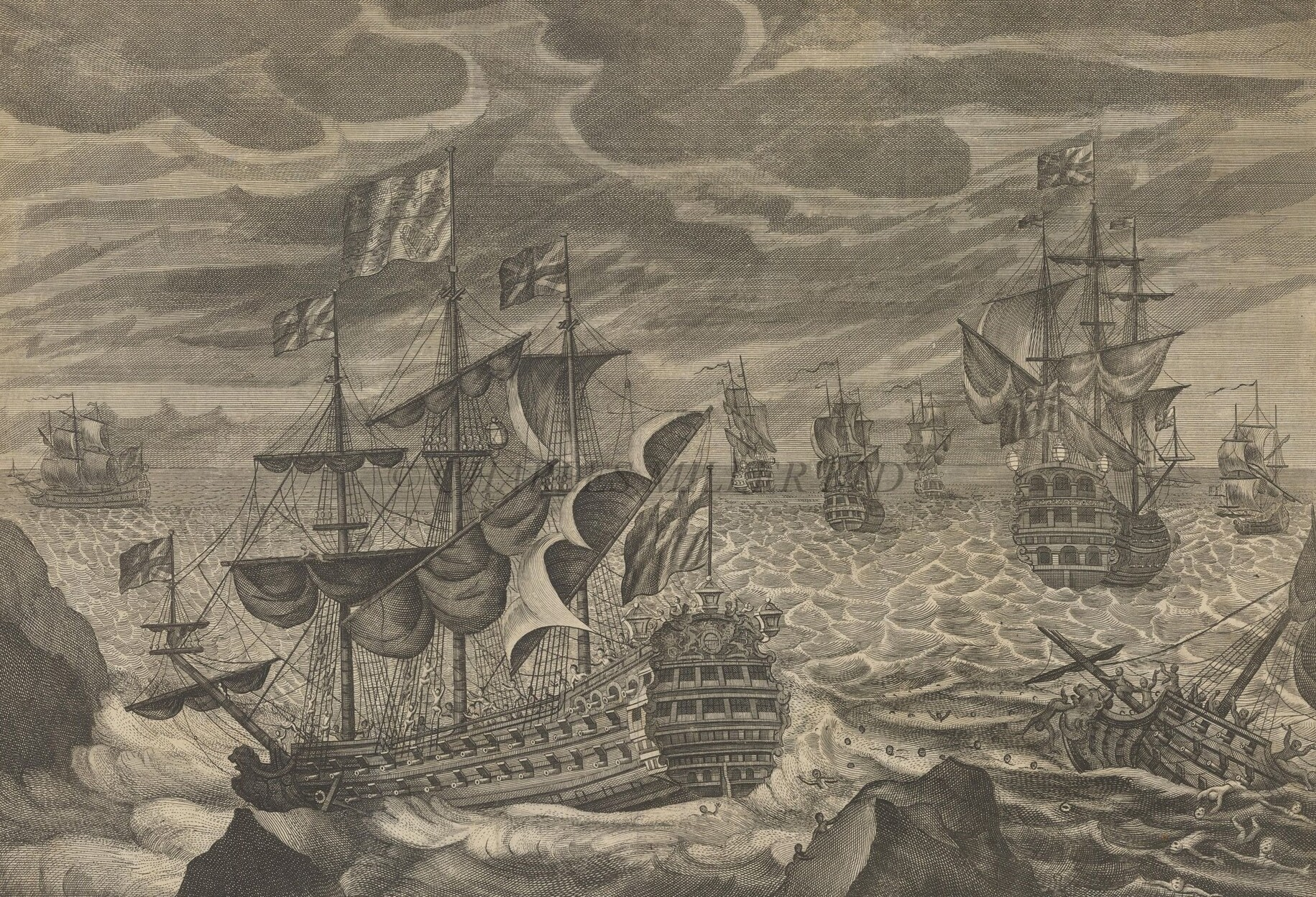
- c. 1739 engraving of Firebrand being lost during the Scilly naval disaster of 1707

History

Great Britain
- Name: Firebrand
- Builder: Limehouse
- Launched: 1694
- Fate: Ran aground in 1707

General characteristics
- Class & type: Fireship
- Tons burthen: 268 bm
- Complement: 45
- Armament: Eight cannon: Six minions; Two falconets

Firebrand was a Royal Navy fireship built at Limehouse in 1694, the first Royal Naval vessel to bear the name.

== Service ==
Firebrand served in the Caribbean and Mediterranean. She is recorded as convoying five merchantmen in company with Winchester near Barbados in March 1695.

== Loss ==
Approximate position of the wreck

Firebrand was lost during the Scilly naval disaster of 1707 when a navigational error sent Admiral Sir Cloudesley Shovell's fleet through dangerous reefs west of Cornwall while on their way from Gibraltar to Portsmouth. On the night of 22 October 1707, Firebrand, commanded by Captain Francis Percy, smashed into the Outer Gilstone Rock off the Isles of Scilly. She was lifted off by a huge wave first, and Percy managed to steer his badly damaged ship along the southern side of the Western Rocks between St Agnes and Annet, but she foundered in Smith Sound, sinking close to Menglow Rock and losing 28 of her crew of 40. Percy and a group of his men managed to get ashore by boat, another five of the crew got ashore on pieces of wreckage. Three more ships (Eagle, Romney and Shovell's flagship Association) also sank that night, bringing the total of sailors lost to nearly 2,000. The Scilly naval disaster was one of the greatest maritime disasters in British history. It was largely as a result of this disaster that the Board of the Admiralty instituted a competition for a more precise method to determine longitude.

== Discovery of the wreck ==
Firebrand lies between the islands of St Agnes and the islet of Annet in position 49°53′20″N 06°20′35″W at a depth of 8 to 25 meters. The wreck was discovered in Smith Sound in 1982, and several items were recovered, including guns and anchors, a wooden "nocturne" (for the time at night), a bell and carved cherubs. In 2006, researchers and students from Bristol University conducted the first archaeological survey of the vessel. This was also the first physical study of this type of Royal Navy ship.
