= HMS Romney (1694) =

Ship of the line of the Royal Navy

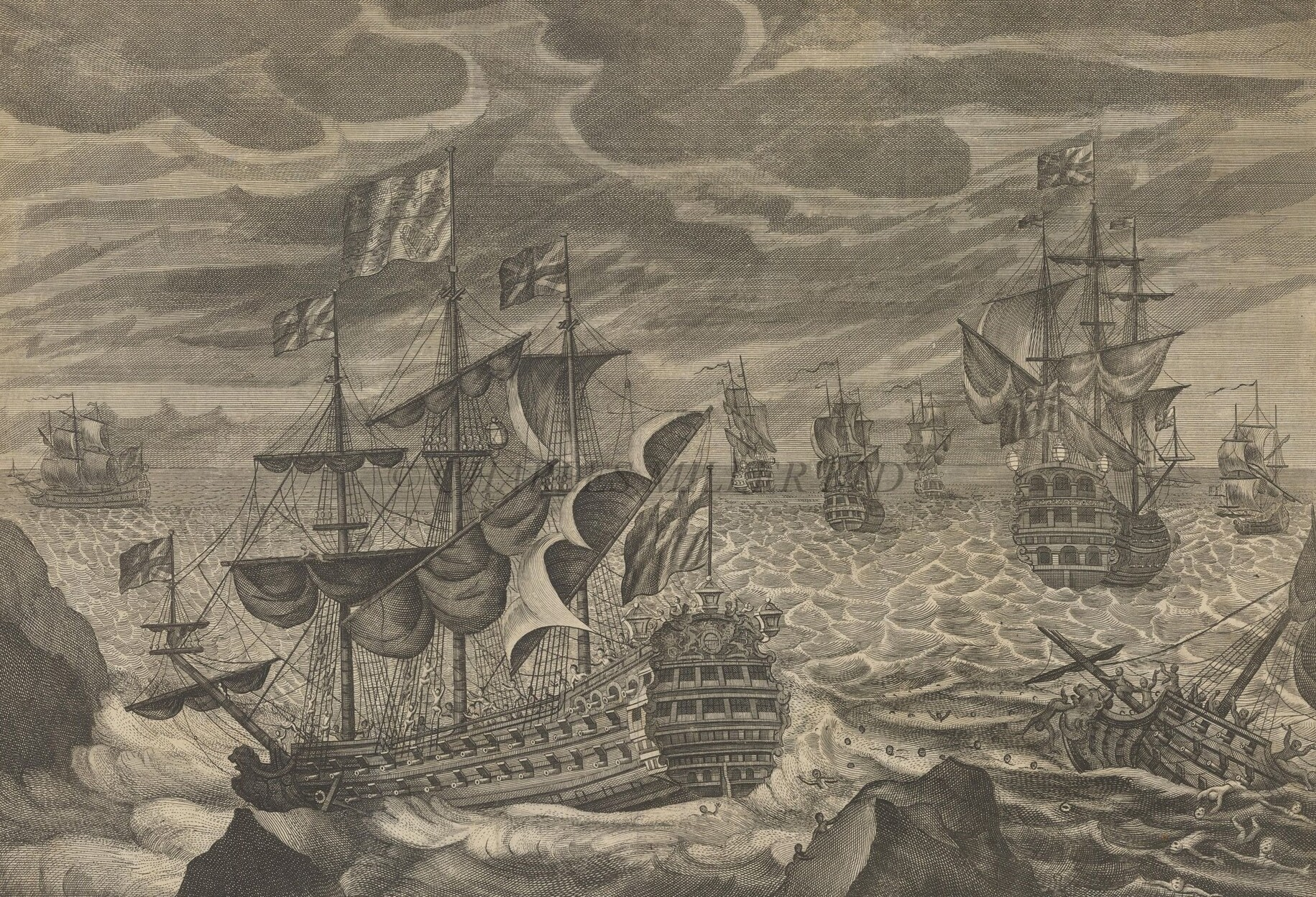
- c. 1739 engraving of Romney being lost during the Scilly naval disaster of 1707

History

Great Britain
- Name: HMS Romney
- Ordered: 16 November 1693
- Builder: Johnson, Sir Henry Johnson, Blackwall Yard
- Launched: 23 October 1694
- Fate: Wrecked, 26 October 1707

General characteristics
- Class & type: 50-gun fourth rate ship of the line
- Tons burthen: 683 41/94 bm
- Length: 130 ft 0.5 in (39.6 m) (gundeck) 109 ft (33.2 m) (keel)
- Beam: 34 ft 4 in (10.5 m)
- Depth of hold: 13 ft 7 in (4.1 m)
- Propulsion: Sails
- Sail plan: Full-rigged ship
- Complement: 230 in wartime, 160 in peace
- Armament: 52 guns: Lower gundeck 22 x 18 pdr culverins; Upper gundeck 20 x 8 pdr demi-culverin3; Quarterdeck 8 x 6 pdr sakers; Forecastle 2 x 6 pdr sakers

HMS Romney was a 50-gun fourth rate ship of the line of the Royal Navy, ordered to be built by commercial contract by Sir Henry Johnson on 16 November 1693 (along with her sistership, the Colchester - the contract for both ships was signed on 23 February 1694), and both ships were launched at the contractor's Blackwall Yard on 23 October 1694. The Romney was commissioned in 1695 under Captain Edmund Loades, for service in the Mediterranean.

Commanded by Captain William Coney, Romney was wrecked on the Bishop & Clerks Rocks, off the Scilly Isles on 26 October 1707 when a disastrous navigational error sent Admiral Sir Cloudesley Shovell's fleet through dangerous reefs while on their way from Gibraltar to Portsmouth. Four ships (Romney, Association, Firebrand and Eagle) were lost, with nearly 2,000 sailors. Romney hit Bishop Rock and went down with all but one of her crew. The sole survivor was George Lawrence, who had worked as a butcher before joining the crew of Romney as quartermaster. The Scillies naval disaster was one of the greatest maritime disasters in British history. It was largely as a result of this disaster that the Board of the Admiralty instituted a competition for a more precise method to determine longitude.
