= List of shipwrecks in the 1700s =

The list of shipwrecks in the 1700s includes ships sunk, foundered, grounded, or otherwise lost from 1700 to 1709.

== 1700 ==
=== September ===
==== 19 September ====
List of shipwrecks: 19 September 1700
Ship	State	Description
HMS Carlisle	Royal Navy	The 48-gun fourth rate exploded and sank in The Downs with the loss of 124 of the 128 crew on board.

==== Unknown date ====
List of shipwrecks: February 1700
Ship	State	Description
Thornton	British East India Company	The East Indiaman was wrecked at Port Quin, Cornwall.
Henrietta Marie	England	African slave trade: The ship was wrecked on the New Ground Reef, off the Marquesas Keys, Spanish Florida, with the loss of all hands.

== 1701 ==
=== February ===
==== 25 February ====
List of shipwrecks: 25 February 1700
Ship	State	Description
Padang	Dutch East India Company	The frigate was reported lost while on a voyage from Batavia to Amboina.

=== December ===
==== Unknown date ====
List of shipwrecks: December 1701
Ship	State	Description
Amity	(Kingdom of England) Royal Africa Company	African slave trade: The slave ship was wrecked on a reef in Dunworley Bay, Ireland, with the loss of all but one of those on board.

== 1702 ==
=== February ===
==== 21 February ====
List of shipwrecks: 21 February 1701
Ship	State	Description
HMS Roebuck	Royal Navy	The fifth rate sprang a leak and sank in Clarence Bay, Ascension Island. Her crew survived. They were rescued on 8 April by Hastings ( East India Company) and three other East India Company vessels.

=== April ===
==== 3 April ====
List of shipwrecks: 3 April 1702
Ship	State	Description
Merestein	Dutch East India Company	The East Indiaman struck rocks and sank in Saldanha Bay off Jutten Island, Africa, with the loss of 101 of the 200 people on board.

=== September ===
==== 30 September ====
List of shipwrecks: 30 September 1702
Ship	State	Description
Glocester Frigot	British East India Company	The ship departed from Plymouth, Devon for Bencoolen, India. No further trace.

=== October ===
==== 23 October ====
List of shipwrecks: October 1702
Ship	State	Description
Dauphin	French Navy	War of the Spanish Succession, Battle of Vigo Bay: The 46-gun ship was set afire and destroyed following the battle.
Espérance	French Navy	War of the Spanish Succession, Battle of Vigo Bay: The 70-gun ship was run ashore and wrecked in Vigo Bay.
Fort	French Navy	War of the Spanish Succession, Battle of Vigo Bay: The 76-gun ship was set afire and destroyed following the battle.
Oriflamme	French Navy	War of the Spanish Succession, Battle of Vigo Bay: The 64-gun ship was set afire and destroyed following the battle.
Prudent	French Navy	War of the Spanish Succession, Battle of Vigo Bay: The 60-gun ship was set afire and destroyed following the battle.
Santo Cristo del Buen Viaje	Spanish Navy	War of the Spanish Succession, Battle of Vigo Bay: The ship was sunk during the battle.
Sirène	French Navy	War of the Spanish Succession, Battle of Vigo Bay: The 60-gun ship was run ashore and wrecked in Vigo Bay.
Solide	French Navy	War of the Spanish Succession, Battle of Vigo Bay: The 56-gun ship was set afire and destroyed following the battle.
Superbe	French Navy	War of the Spanish Succession, Battle of Vigo Bay: The 70-gun ship was run ashore and wrecked in Vigo Bay.
Voluntaire	French Navy	War of the Spanish Succession, Battle of Vigo Bay: The 46-gun ship was run ashore in Vigo Bay.

=== November ===
==== 22 November ====
List of shipwrecks: 22 November 1702
Ship	State	Description
Amsterdam	Dutch East India Company	The Vereenigde Oostindische Compagnie (VOC) type pinnace foundered en route to Basra from Bombay during a storm. All hands were lost.

== 1703 ==
=== January ===
==== 7 January ====
List of shipwrecks: 7 January 1702
Ship	State	Description
Speaker	John Bowen	The ship foundered off the east coast of Mauritius. Her 170 crew survived. The Dutch East India Company sold Bowen a sloop, the Vliegendehart, which they enlarged and sailed away in.

=== November ===
==== 25 November ====
List of shipwrecks: 25 November 1703
Ship	State	Description
Unnamed ship	Dutch Republic	The ship was wrecked on the Goodwin Sands, Kent, England with the loss of all hands.

==== 27 November ====
List of shipwrecks: 27 November 1703
Ship	State	Description
HMS Canterbury	Royal Navy	Great Storm of 1703: The storeship foundered off Bristol with the loss of 26 of her crew. Later salvaged and sold.
HMS Eagle	Royal Navy	Great Storm of 1703: The advice boat sank at Selsey, Sussex. Her crew were rescued.
HMS Mary	Royal Navy	The Great Storm at the Goodwin Sands. Great Storm of 1703: The third rate ship of the line, a Speaker-class frigate, was wrecked on the Goodwin Sands, Kent. Only one of the 273 crew on board survived.
HMS Mortar	Royal Navy	Great Storm of 1703: The bomb vessel was wrecked on the Dutch coasts.
HMS Newcastle	Royal Navy	Great Storm of 1703: The fourth rate frigate was wrecked at Spithead, Hampshire, with the loss of 229 of her crew.
HMS Northumberland	Royal Navy	Great Storm of 1703: The third rate ship of the line was wrecked on the Goodwin Sands with the loss of all 253 of her crew.
HMS Portsmouth	Royal Navy	Great Storm of 1703: The bomb vessel foundered at the Nore with the loss of 44 of her crew.
HMS Reserve	Royal Navy	Great Storm of 1703: The fourth rate frigate foundered in the North Sea off Great Yarmouth, Norfolk, with the loss of all but one of her 270 crew.
HMS Resolution	Royal Navy	Great Storm of 1703: The third rate ship of the line was abandoned off Pevensey, Sussex. Her crew survived.
HMS Restoration	Royal Navy	Great Storm of 1703: The third rate ship of the line was wrecked on the Goodwin Sands with the loss of all 387 of her crew.
HMS Stirling Castle	Royal Navy	Great Storm of 1703: The third rate ship of the line was wrecked on the Goodwin Sands with the loss of all but 70 of her 349 crew.
HMS Vanguard	Royal Navy	Great Storm of 1703: The second rate ship of the line sank at Chatham Dockyard, Kent. She was refloated in 1704, rebuilt and relaunched in 1710.
HMS Vigo	Royal Navy	Great Storm of 1703: The fourth rate ship of the line was wrecked on the Dutch coast.
HMS York	Royal Navy	Great Storm of 1703: The Speaker-class frigate sank at Harwich, Essex, with the loss of four of her crew.
Two merchant ships	Flag unknown	Great Storm of 1703: a ship was driven into a pink in The Downs, both vessels foundered.

=== December ===
==== 2 December ====
List of shipwrecks: 2 December 1703
Ship	State	Description
HMS Mortar	Royal Navy	Great Storm of 1703: The bomb vessel ran ashore on the Dutch coast.

=== Unknown date ===
List of shipwrecks: November 1703
Ship	State	Description
Bandera	Spain	The ship foundered at the mouth of the River Avon, Gloucestershire, England with the loss of all hands.
Richard & John	England	The ship foundered at the mouth of the River Avon with the loss of all hands.

== 1704 ==
=== August ===
List of shipwrecks: August 1704
Ship	State	Description
John and Ann	England	The ship was wrecked near Cardigan.

=== January ===
==== 31 January ====
List of shipwrecks: 3 January 1704
Ship	State	Description
Albemarle	British East India Company	The ship departed on this date. She was subsequently lost at "Balparro".

=== December ===
List of shipwrecks: December 1704
Ship	State	Description
Castle Del Ray	unknown	The ship was driven ashore and sank at Sandy Hook, New Jersey, English America.

=== Unknown date ===
List of shipwrecks: 1704
Ship	State	Description
Cinque Ports	England	The ship foundered in the Pacific Ocean off Malpelo Island, Viceroyalty of Peru. Her crew survived.

== 1705 ==
=== Unknown date ===
List of shipwrecks: 1705
Ship	State	Description
Nuestra Señora del Rosario y Santiago Apostol	Spain	The ship sank in Pensacola Bay, Spanish Florida.
Swan	Unknown	The brigantine was lost in the vicinity of "Squan," a term used at the time for the coast of New Jersey near Manasquan and sometimes for the 7-mile (11 km) stretch of coast between Manasquan Inlet and Cranberry Inlet or for the entire coast of New Jersey between Sea Girt and Barnegat Inlet.

== 1706 ==
=== October ===
==== Unknown date ====
List of shipwrecks: October 1706
Ship	State	Description
Major	England	The pink was wrecked near Cardigan.

=== November ===
==== 19 November ====
List of shipwrecks: 19 November 1706
Ship	State	Description
HMS Hazardous	Royal Navy	The fourth rate ran aground and sank at Bracklesham Bay, Sussex.

== 1707 ==
=== October ===
==== 22 October ====
List of shipwrecks: 22 October 1707
Ship	State	Description
HMS Association	(Kingdom of Great Britain) Royal Navy	Scilly naval disaster of 1707: The second rate ship of the line struck the Outer Gilstone Rock, off the Isles of Scilly and sank with the loss of all hands, approximately 800 men.
HMS Eagle	(Kingdom of Great Britain) Royal Navy	Scilly naval disaster of 1707: The third rate ship of the line was wrecked off the Isles of Scilly with the loss of all hands.
HMS Firebrand	(Kingdom of Great Britain) Royal Navy	Scilly naval disaster of 1707: The fireship struck the Outer Gilstone Rock and consequently foundered in Smith Soud, off the Isles of Scilly with the loss of 28 of her 40 crew.
HMS Romney	(Kingdom of Great Britain) Royal Navy	Scilly naval disaster of 1707: The fourth rate ship of the line struck the Bishop Rock, Isles of Scilly, and foundered with the loss of all but one of her crew.
HMS St George	(Kingdom of Great Britain) Royal Navy	Scilly naval disaster of 1707: The first rate ship of the line struck rocks off the Isles of Scilly. She was refloated, repaired and returned to service.

=== December ===
==== 31 December ====
List of shipwrecks: 31 December 1707
Ship	State	Description
Norske Løve	(Denmark) Danish East India Company	The East Indiaman sank in Lambavík, Faroe Islands. About 100 crew survived.

==== Unknown date ====
List of shipwrecks: Unknown date in December 1707
Ship	State	Description
Unnamed ship	(Spain) Dunkerque	The privateer was wrecked on the Goodwin Sands, Kent, Great Britain, with the loss of all 60 crew.

== 1708 ==
=== January ===
==== Unknown date ====
List of shipwrecks: January 1707
Ship	State	Description
Samuel	England	The ship was wrecked near Cardigan.

=== June ===
==== 8 June ====
List of shipwrecks: 8 June 1708
Ship	State	Description
Concepción	Spain	War of the Spanish Succession, Wager's Action): The ship ran aground on the Isla de Baru. She was set afire and destroyed to prevent her capture by the British.
San José	Spanish Navy	War of the Spanish Succession, Wager's Action): The galleon exploded and sank off the Isla de Baru during battle with HMS Expedition ( (Kingdom of Great Britain) Royal Navy) with the loss of all but eleven of the 600 people on board.

== 1709 ==
=== April ===
==== 9 April ====
List of shipwrecks: 9 April 1709
Ship	State	Description
Bristol	French Navy	The man-of-war, which had been captured by the French the day before, was recaptured by a Royal Navy squadron, but subsequently sank.

== Notes ==
1. Until 1752, the year began on Lady Day (25 March) Thus 24 March 1700 was followed by 25 March 1701. 31 December 1701 was followed by 1 January 1701.
