= List of ship launches in 1679 =

The list of ship launches in 1679 includes a chronological list of some ships launched in 1679.

Date	Ship	Class	Builder	Location	Country	Notes
31 January	Eagle	Third rate	Daniel Furzer, Portsmouth Dockyard	Portsmouth	England	For Royal Navy.
January	Glorieux	Third rate	Laurent Hubac	Brest	Kingdom of France	For French Navy.
4 March	Windsor Castle	Second rate	John Shish, Deptford Dockyard	Deptford	England	For Royal Navy.
23 March	Stenbocken	Frigate	Robert Turner	Stockholm	Kingdom of Sweden	
17 May	Grafton	Third rate	Thomas Shish, Deptford Dockyard	Deptford	England	For Royal Navy.
May	Berwick	Third rate	Phineas Pett, Chatham Dockyard	Chatham	England	For Royal Navy.
May	Duchess	Second rate	John Shish, Deptford Dockyard	Deptford	England	For Royal Navy.
May	Sandwich	Second rate	J Betts	Harwich	England	For Royal Navy.
June	Northumberland	Third rate	Francis Baylie	Bristol	England	For Royal Navy.
10 September	Expedition	Third rate	Daniel Furzer, Portsmouth Dockyard	Portsmouth	England	For Royal Navy.
26 September	Bredah	Third rate	Isaac Betts	Harwich	England	For Royal Navy.
5 October	Précieux	Fourth rate	Etienne Salicon	Le Havre	Kingdom of France	For French Navy.
October	San Giovanni Battista Piccolo	Sant'Antonio da Padova-class ship of the line	Stefano di Zuanne Chinn	Venice	Republic of Venice	For Venetian Navy.
3 November	Leger	Fourth rate	Etienne Salicon	Le Havre	Kingdom of France	For French Navy.
November	Burford	Third rate	Phineas Pett / Thomas Shish, Woolwich Dockyard	Woolwich	England	For Royal Navy.
18 December	Courageux	Third rate	Noel Pomet	Rochefort	Kingdom of France	For French Navy.
Unknown date	Breda	Third rate	J Betts	Harwich	England	For Royal Navy.
Unknown date	Bridgett	Unrated smack	Jonas Shish, Deptford Dockyard	Deptford	England	For Royal Navy.
Unknown date	Essex	Third rate	Johnson, Blackwall Yard	Blackwall	England	For Royal Navy.
Unknown date	Excellent	Second rate	Honoré Mallet	Rochefort	Kingdom of France	For French Navy.
Unknown date	Henrietta	Unrated yacht	Thomas Shish, Deptford Dockyard	Deptford	England	For royal Navy.
Unknown date	Kent	Third rate	Johnson, Blackwall Yard	Blackwall	England	For Royal Navy.
Unknown date	Elizabeth	Second rate	Deptford Dockyard	Deptford	England	For Royal Navy.
Unknown date	Phénix	Fourth rate	Honoré Mallet	Rochefort	Kingdom of France	For French Navy.
Unknown date	Moriaans Hoofd	Fourth rate	Jean Lis	Amsterdam	Dutch Republic	For Dutch Republic Navy.
Unknown date	Nijmegen	Fourth rate			Dutch Republic	For Dutch Republic Navy.
Unknown date	Pendennis	Third rate	Phineas Pett, Chatham Dockyard	Chatham	England	For Royal Navy.
Unknown date	Stirling Castle	Third rate	John Shish, Deptford Dockyard	Deptford	England	For Royal Navy.
Unknown date	Victorieux	First rate	François Pomet	Rochefort	Kingdom of France	For French Navy.
