= Action at Barfleur =

1692 battle of the Nine Years' War

- Part of the Battles of Barfleur and La Hougue
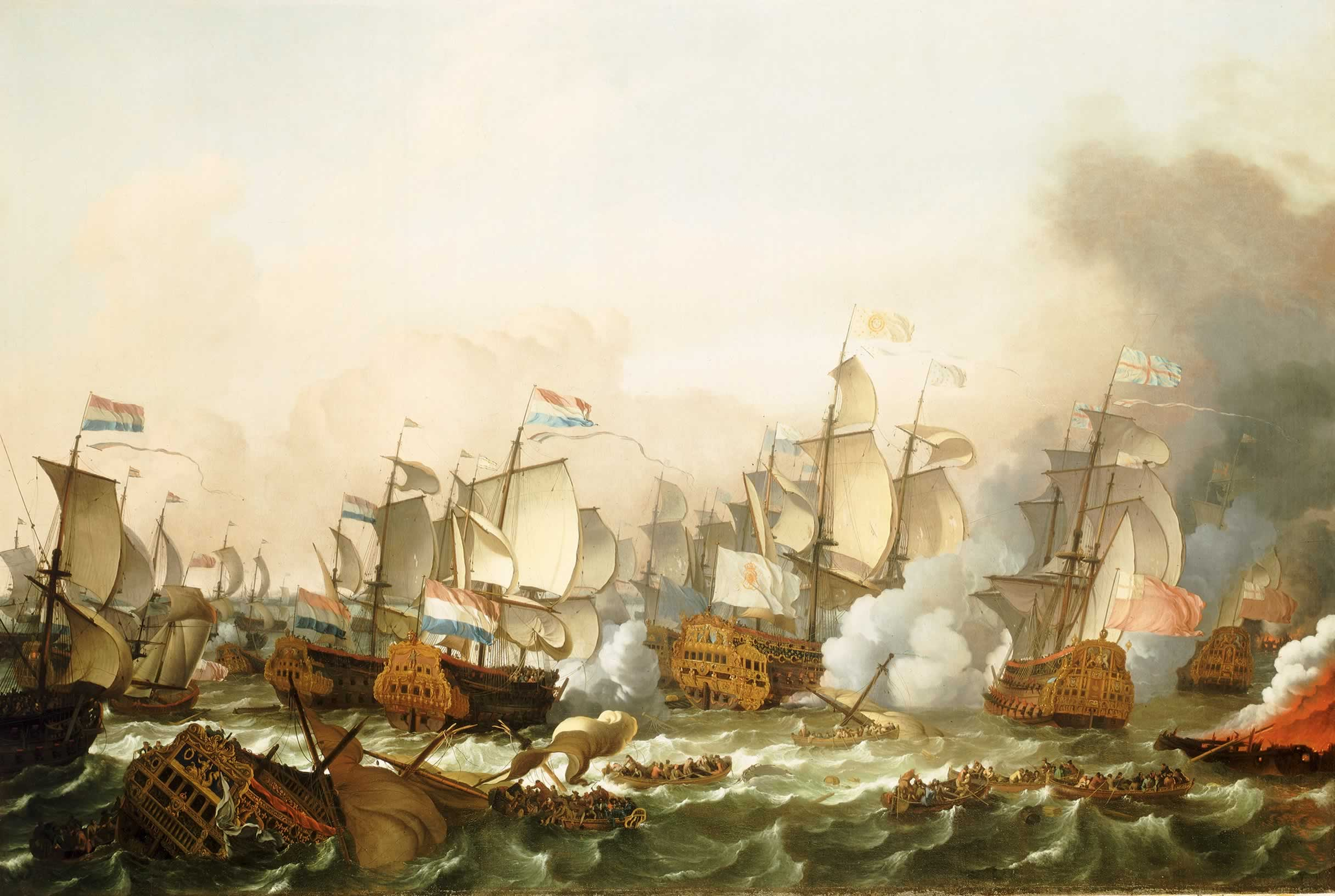
- The Battle of Barfleur, 19 May 1692; Ludolf Bakhuizen, c. 1693
Date	19 May (OS) (29 May (NS)), 1692
Location	Off the Cotentin Peninsula, English Channel 49.6884721°N 1.2212066175°W
Result	Inconclusive

Belligerents
England; Dutch Republic	France

Commanders and leaders
(Kingdom of England) Edward Russell (Dutch Republic) Philips van Almonde	(Kingdom of France) Anne Hilarion de Tourville

Strength
82 ships of the line 40,000 crewmen	44 ships of the line 20,000 crewmen

Casualties and losses
2,000 killed 3,000 wounded	1,700 killed or wounded

The action at Barfleur was part of the Battles of Barfleur and La Hougue during the War of the Grand Alliance. A French fleet under Anne Hilarion de Tourville was seeking to cover an invasion of England by a French army to restore James II to the throne, but was intercepted by an Anglo-Dutch fleet under Edward Russell, 1st Earl of Orford on 19 May Old Style (29 May New Style) 1692.

== Background ==
The fleets sighted each other at first light on the morning of 19 May 1692 off Cap Barfleur on the Cotentin Peninsula.

On sighting the allied fleet, at about 6am, Tourville held a council of war with his captains; the advice, and his own opinion, was against action; however, Tourville felt compelled by strict orders from the king to engage. He also may have expected defections from the English fleet by captains with Jacobite sympathies, though in this he was to be disappointed.

In the light south-westerly breeze the fleets slowly closed, Russell from the north east, Tourville, with the weather gage, from the south west, on a starboard tack to bring his line of battle into contact with Russell's. Because of the calm conditions it was not until 11am, 5 hours after first sighting each other, that the two fleets were within range of each other.

== Dispositions ==
The French line was led by the Blue-and-White squadron, 14 ships of the line in three divisions under the flag officers Nesmond, d'Amfreville and Relingue. They were matched by the Dutch White squadron of 26 ships under Almonde, again in three divisions under van der Putte, Gilles Schey and Gerard Callenburgh.

In the centre, the French White squadron (16 ships under Villette Mursay, Tourville and Langeron) opposed the English Red squadron (27 ships under Delaval, Russell and Shovell).

Bringing up the rear, the French Blue squadron (14 ships under Coetlogon, Gabaret and Pannetier) would face the English Blue squadron (29 ships under Carter, Ashby and Rooke).

Tourville re-inforced his centre, the White squadron under his own command, by bringing Coetlogon's division forward in order to engage Russell's Red squadron with something approaching equal numbers, while he refused and extended the line of his White squadron to avoid them being turned and overwhelmed by superior numbers; the rest of his Blue squadron he held back also to keep the advantage of the weather gage.

Russell countered by holding fire as long as possible, to allow the French fleet to close; Almonde tried to extend his line to overlap the French van, while Ashby was still some way off and trying to close. The two fleets were within range at 11am, but both with-held firing for a further 15 minutes, until the Saint Louis (number 4 in the French Blue-and-White squadron) fired on her opposite number; at that the firing became general up and down the line.

== Battle ==
=== Morning ===
11 am to 1 pm

For the next few hours Tourville's White and Russell's Red squadrons were closely engaged, and causing each other considerable damage. Centurion 50 (Red 7) was engaged by Ambiteux 96 (White 7, Villettes flagship) and severely damaged; Chester 50 (Red 12) was outgunned by Glorieux 64 (White 8) and had to withdraw; Eagle 70 (Red 11) was forced to pull out of the line, with 70 dead, to repair damage, but was able to re-join after emergency repairs; while Grafton 70 (Red 18) suffered 80 casualties, but was able to continue.

On the French side, Soleil Royal 104 (White 10, Tourville's flagship) was engaged by three English ships, Britannia 100, (White 14, Russell's flagship) supported by London 96 (Red 15) and St Andrew 56 (White 13); she was severely damaged, and forced at one point out of the line; Perle 52 (White 7) was shot through and through, and suffered one-third of her crew as casualties. Henri 64 (White 2) and Fort 60 (White 1) were both severely damaged trying to hold the line between the White and the Blue-and-White squadrons, to prevent a gap opening; Henri was battered until she could no longer fight, and only escaped capture when Villette sent boats to tow her to safety; Fort's crew were forced to use sweeps to pull her out of the line for respite.

=== Afternoon ===
1pm

At about 1pm the wind, which up to then had been south-westerly, if it blew at all, strengthened and shifted to the east. This gave the benefit of the weather gage to the allies, who immediately took advantage of it. Shovell saw a gap in the French line ahead of him, and steered towards it; his Royal William 100 (23rd in the Red) broke through to engage the French White from both sides. He was followed by the rest of his division, while Kent 70 (Red 22), and St Albans 50 (Red 21), who were ahead of him in the line, pulled round to follow the William through the breach.

Hampton Court 70 and Swiftsure 70 (the Red 19 and 20), which were ahead of them again, remained to the windward of the French, and joined themselves to Russells division. Carter, with the leading Blue division, saw Shovell's action and followed also, giving about a dozen ships doubling the French line.

In the van, the wind enabled Almonde to extend and cross the head of the French line; Nesmond responded by turning his division into the wind also, so that over the next few hours the French Blue-and-White became at right angles to the centre (White).

Shovell's action brought Tourville's ships under fire from both sides; Soleil Royal particularly was hard pressed until Coetlogon, with Magnifique 86 (Blue 3) and Prince 56 (blue 2) interposed.

3pm

By 3 o’clock the French line was curved leeward like a fish-hook; the Blue-and-White was turned back to the centre, with the Dutch extended around them. When Prince 56 (the French Blue 2, in Coetlogon's division) was hotly engaged on both sides, with a third across her stern, she was saved by Monarque 90, Nesmondes flagship.

In the centre, Coetlogon and Tourville were engaged on either side by Shovell and Russell, while Carter was matched by the French rear divisions. To the east, Ashby and Rooke were endeavouring to get into action.

4pm

By 4 o’clock the wind had died, the sea becoming flat calm, and visibility dropping due to battle smoke. The continuous firing also tended to push the embattled ships apart, offering some respite, as both sides were becoming exhausted.

In the van, Nesmonde continued to turn as Almonde continued to extend and turn the line, both sides using boats to tow the ships into position, while in the rear Ashby was also using boats to bring his Blue squadron into the fray. In the poor visibility however he was unable to see Carter, his vice-admiral, who was in the position of advantage with Shovell beyond the French line, and sorely pressed: He continued to head towards the French Blue squadron, which was north of the main action.

5pm

By 5pm the centres were re-engaged; Russell had used his boats to tow his ships back into action. The fog had lifted, cleared by a light breeze. As the wind strengthened, Tourville headed north west towards Carter, in order to fight his way out of the encirclement. Russell pursued, until the wind, unpredictable all day, died away and the mist closed in once more.

=== Evening ===
6pm

At around 6pm the tide began to turn; seeking to take advantage of this, and remembering how the English had escaped after the battle of Beachy Head two years before, Tourville had his ships anchor at the end of slack water, with their sails still set. Deceived by this, Russell's squadron was carried away by the flood tide, until they could themselves anchor, now out of range giving the French a respite. Shovell's ships, uptide of the French, had also anchored, either foreseeing the French manoeuvre, or seeking respite themselves; only Sandwich 90 (Red 24) was unprepared, and was swept by the flood into and through the French line, being severely damaged, and suffering many casualties, including her captain.

7pm

At around 7pm the wind arose again, from the southeast, allowing the English Blue squadron to join the action. Because of Ashby's previous manoeuvres, Rooke's division was now closer to the embattled Red squadron, and joined the fray.

Neptune 96 (Blue 24, Rooke's flagship), Windsor Castle 90 (Blue 25) and Expedition 70 (Blue 26), were able to engage the French ships, particularly Soleil Royal and Ambiteux, increasing the damage they had already sustained. Ashby, in Victory 100 (Blue 14) and the rest of his division joined the fray shortly after, engaging the main body for the next two hours.

8pm

Shovell's ships were still in range of the French, but found themselves sternwards to the French bows, so only a few guns on either side could be engaged. From his position uptide, Shovell attempted to break up the French formation by sending fireships onto them with the tide; his intent was to oblige Tourville to cut his anchor cables to escape them, leaving him to drift with the tide onto Russell's guns. Four fireships were released, but the French were able to fend them off . One fireship became entangled with Perle, but her crew were able to cut it loose; another, released by Cambridge, 70, and aimed at Soleil Royal, came so close as to persuade the French flagship to cut, but she was able to re-anchor before coming within range of Russell's ships.

9pm

At around 9pm Shovell and Rooke decided their position was too exposed to be tenable. As the only ships between the French fleet and the open sea, and being out of contact with the rest of the allied fleet, they decided to use the last of the flood tide to sail through the French fleet and re-join the English line. French contemporary accounts present this as a mistake, as their position placed Tourville in some difficulty, but it is conceivable that if the whole French fleet swept down on them on the ebb, they would be overwhelmed. As it was, the manoeuvre was fraught with difficulty; all their ships were exposed to close raking fire, and were cut up severely.

=== Aftermath ===
10pm

By 10pm the battle was almost over. Both sides were exhausted, and the majority of the ships on both sides were damaged, many severely. Amazingly, none of the ships from either line were lost; none were sunk or captured. Shovell had expended four of his fireships without result, and another had burned earlier after being hit by gunfire; these could be seen burning in the night, and were noted by the captain of the Monmouth in his log. Both sides reported a large explosion around this time, but both thought it was a ship from the opposing fleet. Whichever ship it involved, it was not fatal, as all the ships from both lines were accounted for after the action. On the turn of the tide, and in the moonlight, Tourville ordered the French fleet to cut their anchor cables and slip away; the allies followed on as they could.

== Ships ==
=== Allies ===
White Squadron (Dutch) (Almonde)
Ship	Guns	Commander
Noordholland	68
Zeelandia	90
Ter Goes	54
Gelderland	64
Veere	62
Conink William	92	Vice-Admiral Carel van der Putte
Eerste Edele	74
Medenblick	50
Keurvorst van Brandenburg	92
Westvriesland	88
Zeeland	64
Ripperda	50
Slot Muyden	72
Prins	92	Admiral Philips van Almonde
Elswoud	72
Schattershoeff	50
Leyden	64
Princes	92	Vice-Admiral Gilles Schey
Amsterdam	64
Stadt en Land	50
Veluw	64
Casteel Medenblick	86	Vice-Admiral Gerard Callenburgh
Ridderschap	72
Maegt van Doort	64
Admiraal-Generaal	84	Rear-Admiral Philips van der Goes
Zeven Provinciën	76

Red Squadron (English) (Russell)
Ship	Guns	Commander
St Michael	90	Captain Thomas Hopsonn
Lenox	70	Captain John Munden
Bonaventure	48	Captain John Hubbard
Royal Katherine	82	Captain Wolfran Cornewall
Royal Sovereign	100	Vice-Admiral Sir Ralph Delaval; Captain Humphrey Sanders
Captain	70	Captain Daniel Jones
Centurion	48	Captain Francis Wyvill
Burford	70	Captain Thomas Harlow
Elizabeth	70	Captain Stafford Fairborne
Rupert	66	Captain Basil Beaumont
Eagle	70	Captain John Leake
Chester	48	Captain Thomas Gillam
St Andrew	96	Captain George Churchill
Britannia	100	Admiral of the Fleet Edward Russell; Captain of the Fleet David Mitchell; Captain John Fletcher
London	96	Captain Matthew Aylmer
Greenwich	54	Captain Richard Edwards
Restoration	70	Captain James Gother
Grafton	70	Captain William Bokenham
Hampton Court	70	Captain John Graydon
Swiftsure	70	Captain Richard Clarke
St Albans	50	Captain Richard Fitzpatrick
Kent	70	Captain John Neville
Royal William	100	Rear-Admiral Sir Cloudesley Shovell; Captain Thomas Jennings
Sandwich	90	Captain Anthony Hastings †
Oxford	54	Captain James Wishart
Cambridge	70	Captain Richard Lestock
Ruby	50	Captain George Mees

Blue Squadron (English) (Ashby)
Ship	Guns	Commander
Hope	70	Captain Henry Robinson
Deptford	50	Captain William Kerr
Essex	70	Captain John Bridges
Duke	90	Rear-Admiral Richard Carter †; Captain William Wright
Ossory	90	Captain John Tyrrell
Woolwich	54	Captain Christopher Myngs
Suffolk	70	Captain Christopher Billopp
Crown	50	Captain Thomas Warren
Dreadnought	64	Captain Thomas Coall
Stirling Castle	70	Captain Benjamin Walters
Edgar	72	Captain John Torpley
Monmouth	63	Captain Robert Robinson
Duchess	90	Captain John Clements
Victory	100	Admiral Sir John Ashby; Captain Edward Stanley
Vanguard	90	Captain Christopher Mason
Adventure	44	Captain Thomas Dilkes
Warspite	70	Captain Caleb Grantham
Montagu	62	Captain Simon Foulks
Defiance	64	Captain Edward Gurney
Berwick	70	Captain Henry Martin
Lion	60	Captain Robert Wiseman
Northumberland	70	Captain Andrew Cotten
Advice	50	Captain Charles Hawkins
Neptune	96	Vice-Admiral George Rooke; Captain Thomas Gardner
Windsor Castle	90	Captain Lord Danby
Expedition	70	Captain Edward Dover
Monck	60	Captain Benjamin Hoskins
Resolution	70	Captain Edward Good
Albemarle	90	Captain Sir Francis Wheler

=== French ===
Blue-and-White Squadron (D’Amfreville)
Ship	Guns	Commander
Bourbon	68
Monarque	90	Flag of Nesmonde
Aimable	70
Saint-Louis	64
Diamant	60
Gaillard	68
Terrible	80
Merveilleux	90	Flag of D’Amfreville
Tonnant	80
Saint-Michel	60
Sans Pareil	62
Sérieux	64
Foudroyant	84	Flag of Relingue
Brillant	62

White Squadron (Tourville)
Ship	Guns	Commander
Fort	60
Henri	64
Ambitieux	96	Flag of Villette-Mursay
Couronne	76
Maure	52
Courageux	58
Perle	52
Glorieux	64
Conquerant	84
Soleil Royal	104	Flag of Tourville
Sainte Philippe	84
Admirable	90
Content	68
Souverain	80	Flag of Langeron
Illustre	70
Moderé	52

Blue Squadron (Gabaret)
Ship	Guns	Commander
Excellent	60
Prince	56
Magnifique	86	Flag of Coetlogon
Laurier	64
Brave	58
Entendu	60
Triomphant	76
Orgueilleux	94	Flag of Gabaret
Fier	80
Fleuron	56
Courtisan	64
Grand	84	Flag of Pannetier
Saint-Esprit	74
Sirène	64
