= Admiral Beaumont =

Admiral Beaumont may refer to:

- Alan Beaumont (1934–2004), Royal Australian Navy admiral
- Basil Beaumont (1669–1703), British Royal Navy rear admiral
- John Beaumont, 4th Baron Beaumont (1361–1396), English admiral
- Lewis Beaumont (1847–1922), British Royal Navy admiral
