= HMS Edgar (1668) =

Ship of the line of the Royal Navy

History

Great Britain
- Name: HMS Edgar
- Namesake: Edgar, King of England (859-875)
- Ordered: 30 June 1666
- Builder: Francis Baylie, Bristol
- Launched: 29 July 1668
- Fate: Burnt, 1711

General characteristics as built
- Class & type: 72-gun third rate ship of the line
- Tons burthen: 1,04651/94 bm
- Length: 153 ft 6 in (46.79 m) (gundeck), 124 ft (38 m) (keel)
- Beam: 39 ft 10 in (12.14 m)
- Depth of hold: 16 ft 1 in (4.90 m)
- Propulsion: Sails
- Sail plan: Full-rigged ship
- Complement: 445 (wartime)
- Armament: 72 guns: 26 demi-cannon 32-pounders; 26 x 12-pounders; 16 sakers; 4 x 3-pounders

General characteristics after 1700 rebuild
- Class & type: 70-gun third rate ship of the line
- Tons burthen: 1,04491/94 bm tons
- Length: 153 ft 6 in (46.79 m) (gundeck), 124 ft 4 in (37.90 m) (gundeck)
- Beam: 39 ft 9 in (12.12 m)
- Depth of hold: 15 ft 6 in (4.72 m)
- Propulsion: Sails
- Sail plan: Full-rigged ship
- Armament: 70 guns of various weights of shot

General characteristics after 1709 rebuild
- Class & type: 1706 Establishment 70-gun third rate ship of the line
- Tons burthen: 1,12064/94 bm tons
- Length: 149 ft 8 in (45.62 m) (gundeck), 122 ft 4 in (37.29 m) (keel)
- Beam: 41 ft 6 in (12.65 m)
- Depth of hold: 17 ft 4 in (5.28 m)
- Propulsion: Sails
- Sail plan: Full-rigged ship
- Armament: 70 guns: Gundeck: 26 × 24 pdrs; Upper gundeck: 26 × 12 pdrs; Quarterdeck: 14 × 6 pdrs; Forecastle: 4 × 6 pdrs

HMS Edgar was a 72-gun third rate ship of the line of the Royal Navy, built by Baylie of Bristol and launched in 1668. The diarist and naval administrator Samuel Pepys visited the town during its construction, noting that in his opinion, "it will be a fine ship". Ordered under the 1666 Programme (along with the Resolution), the Edgar was the largest and longest Third Rate built to date. She was named by Charles II after Edgar, King of England from 859 to 875, to commemorate the fact that Edgar was the first English king to establish naval power on a firm basis. Baylie obtained excellent sailing qualities from the ship by stepping the masts some 10 to 12ft farther aft than normal.

The Edgar was to take part in seven major battles before being entirely rebuilt in 1700. During the Third Anglo-Dutch War, she participated in the Battle of Solebay on 28 May 1672, the two Battles of Schooneveld on 28 May and 4 June 1673, and the Battle of Texel on 11 August 1673. By 1685 she was carrying 74 guns, comprising 24 demi-cannon, 28 culverins and 22 demi-culverins (of which 10 were cutts).

In May 1689 Edgar saw action in the Nine Years' War initially under the command of Cloudesley Shovell, who was knighted and later became Admiral of the Fleet. During this war, Edgar was present at the first fight of the Battle of Bantry Bay when a French fleet was landing troops against King William III. She then took part in the Battle of Beachy Head on 30 June 1690, and in the Battle of Barfleur on 19 May 1692.

The Edgar paid off in October 1698 and on 15 April 1699 was ordered to undergo a rebuild at Portsmouth Dockyard under the supervision of Master shipwright Elias Waffe as a 70-gun ship, from which she emerged to re-commission in 1702. She was rebuilt for a second time by contract dated 5 December 1706 by John and Richard Burchett of Rotherhithe as a 70-gun ship to the 1706 Establishment, relaunching on 31 March 1709.

The Edgar was destroyed by an accidental explosion while at Spithead, Hampshire on 15 October 1711, while all her commissioned officers were ashore, with heavy loss of life. The wrecked was cleared in May 1844.

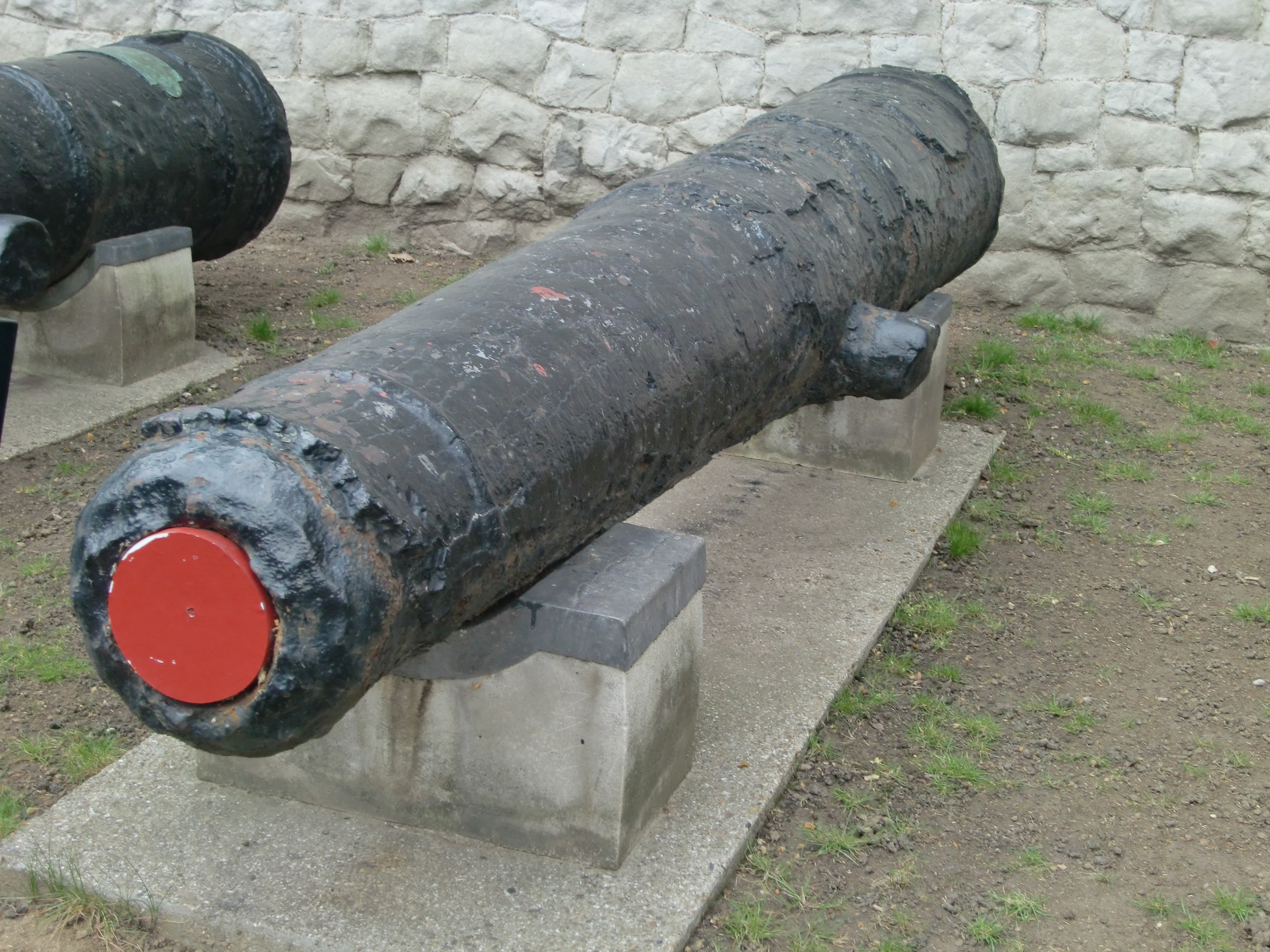
32-pounder salvaged in 1844, 133 years after the sinking, now on display at the Tower of London
