= Christopher Pett =

British shipbuilder (1620–1668)

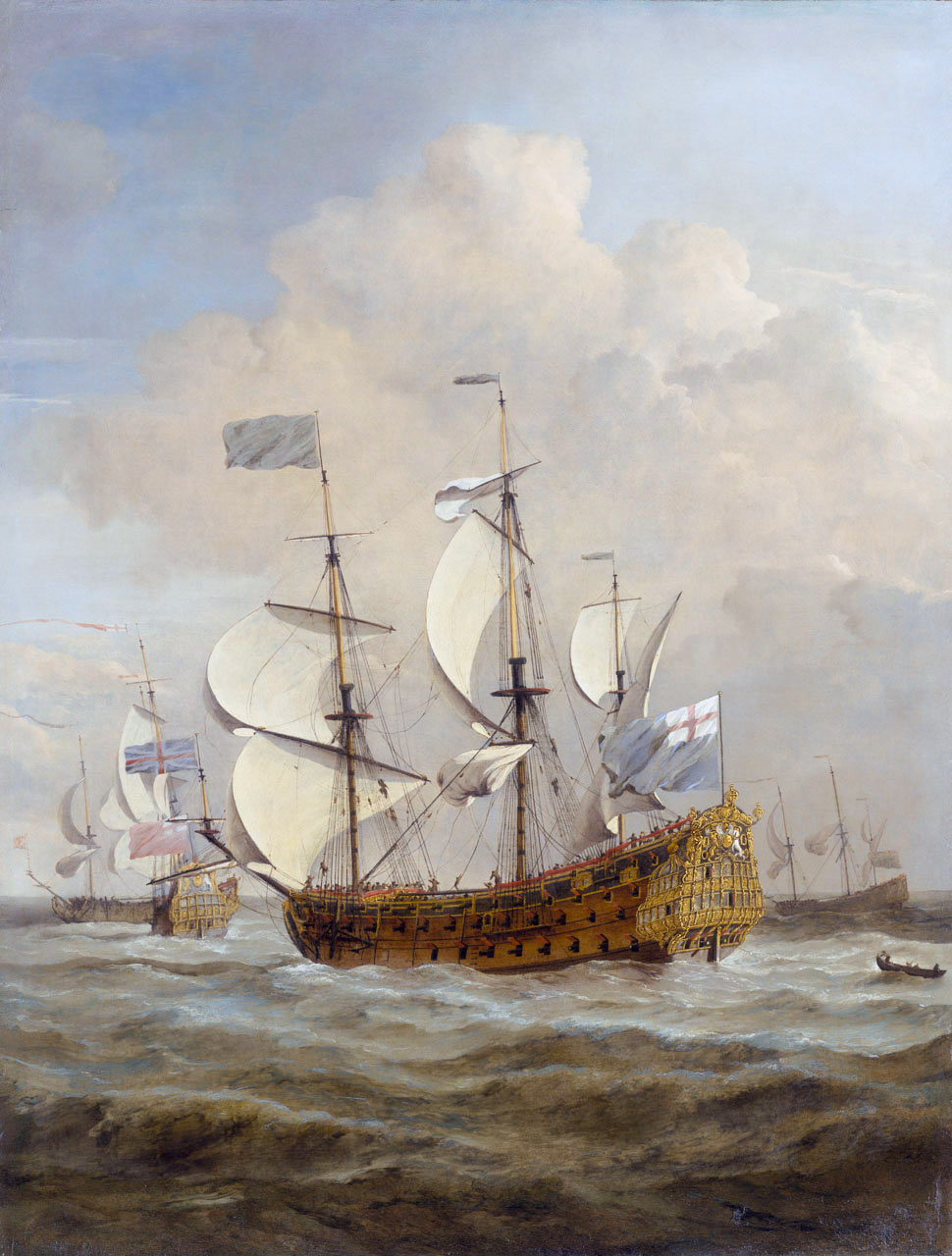
HMS St Andrew

Christopher Pett (1620–1668) was an English shipbuilder for the Royal Navy and part of the Pett dynasty of shipbuilders. He is mentioned in the Diary of Samuel Pepys.

== History ==
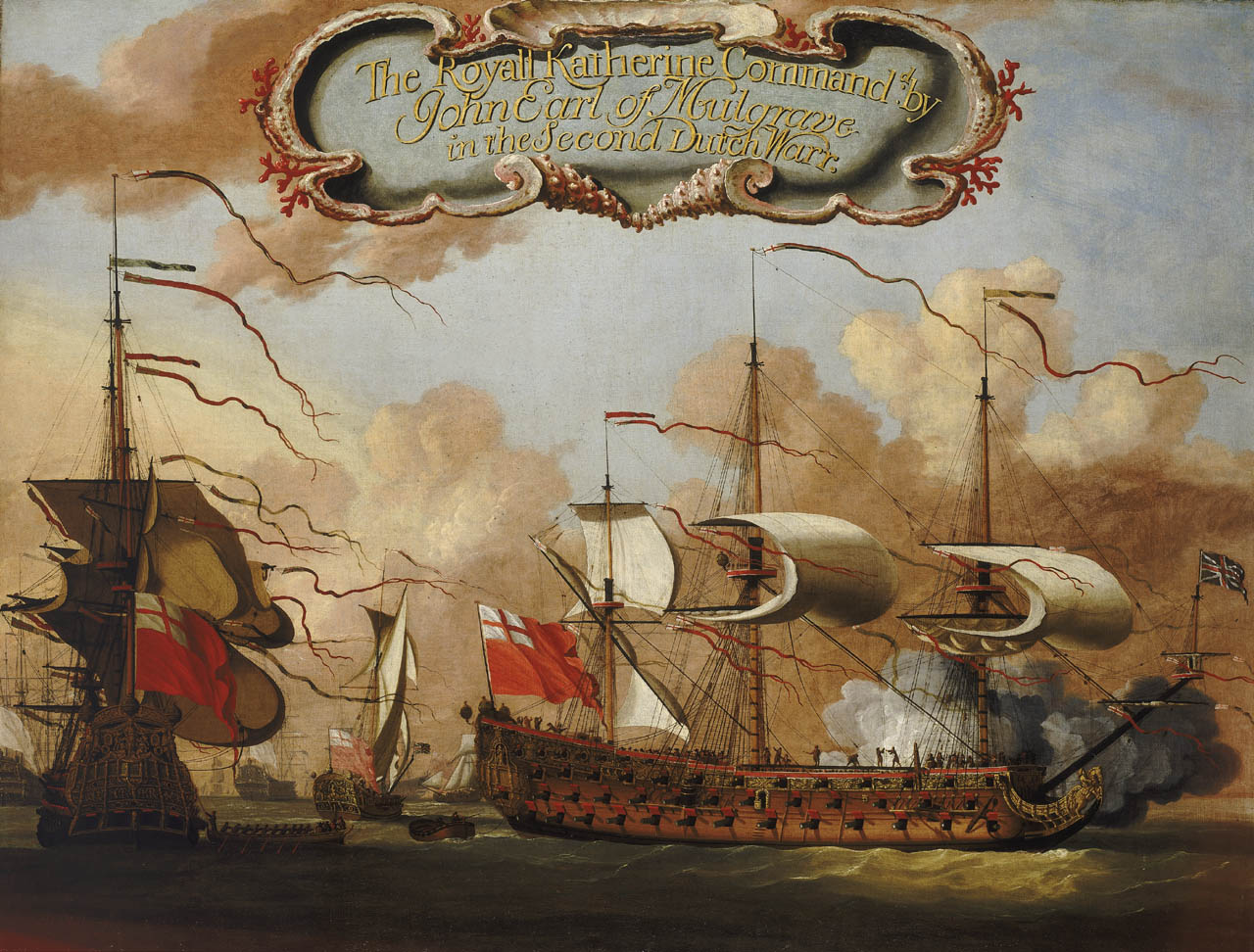
HMS Royal Katherine

He was born on 4 May 1620, the eleventh child of many children to Phineas Pett, shipbuilder to the King, and his wife Ann Nicholls.

In 1647, he was appointed Master Shipwright at Deptford Dockyard in place of Peter, who moved to be Commissioner of Chatham Dockyard.

In the 1660s, he began building private yachts, over and above his Royal Navy commissions, as part of a current fashion, including a yacht for Sir William Batten.

He died suddenly in March 1668.

== Ships built ==
- English ship Speaker (1650) 50-gun ship of the line launched at Woolwich Dockyard
- English ship Antelope (1652) 56-gun frigate launched at Woolwich Dockyard
- English ship Swiftsure (1653) 56-gun ship of the line launched at Deptford Dockyard
- Rose, 6-gun pink (1657) launched at Woolwich
- Hart, 8-gun pink (1658) launched at Woolwich
- English ship Richard (1658) 70-gun ship of the line launched at Woolwich
- Anne, 8-gun yacht (1661) launched at Woolwich
- Charles, 6-gun yacht (1662) launched at Woolwich
- Henrietta, 8-gun yacht (1663) launched at Woolwich
- HMS Royal Katherine (1664) 84-gun ship of the line launched at Woolwich
- HMS Falcon (1666) 42-gun ship launched at Woolwich
- HMS Greenwich (1666) 58-gun ship of the line launched at Woolwich
- HMS St Andrew (1670) 100-gun ship of the line launched at Woolwich, one of the largest ships built at that date with a crew of 730 men. Begun by Pett finished by his brothers.

== Family ==
His widow Ann Pett wrote to Samuel Pepys to help her gain a pension from the King. She later married shipwright Daniel Furzer.
