= Basil Beaumont =

Royal Navy admiral (1669-1703)

Rear-Admiral Basil Beaumont
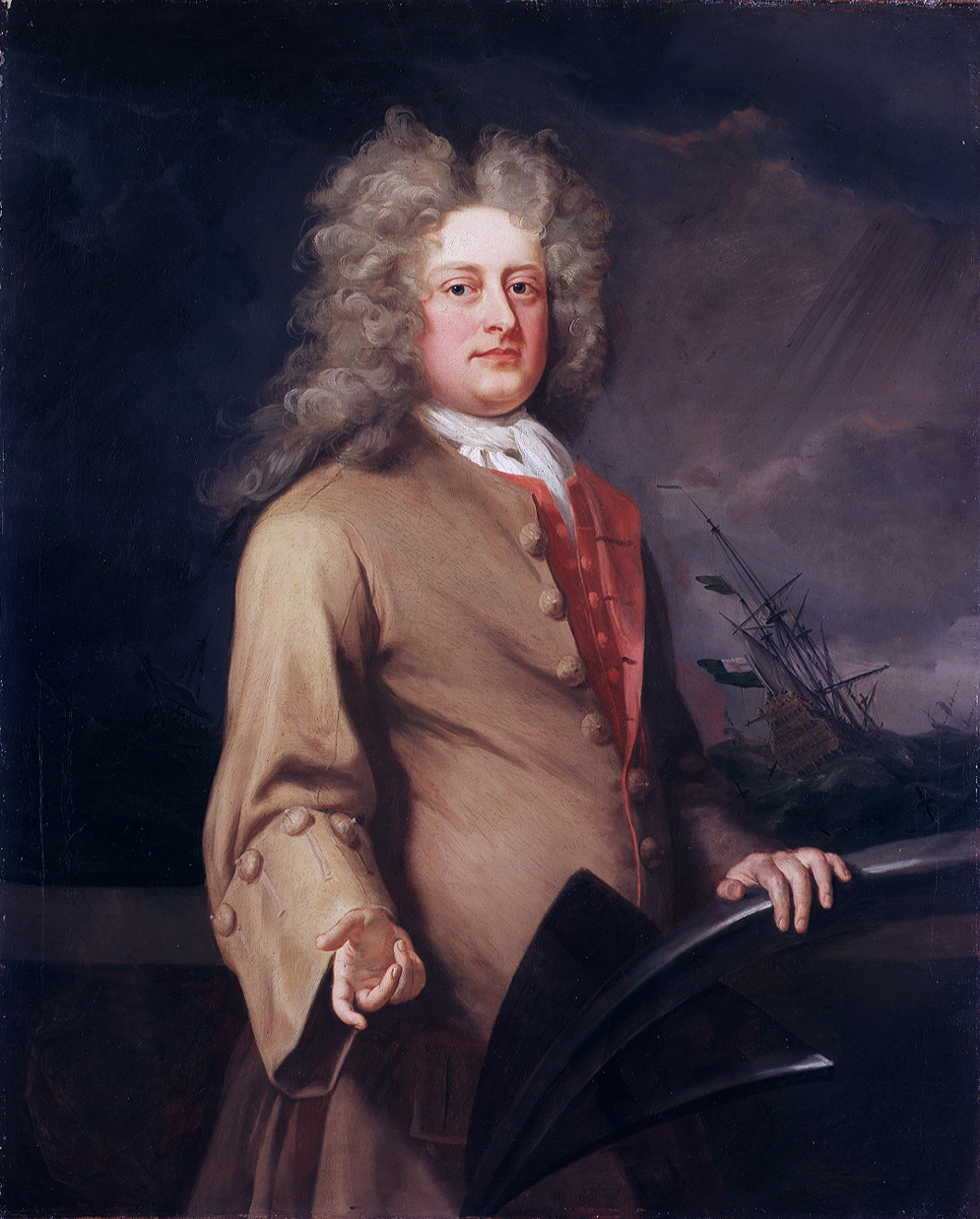
- Portrait by Michael Dahl
- Born: 1669; England
- Died: 29 November 1703 (aged 33–34); Goodwin Sands
- Military career
- Allegiance: England
- Branch: Royal Navy
- Service years: –1703
- Rank: Rear admiral

Rear-Admiral Basil Beaumont (1669 – 29 November 1703) was a Royal Navy officer who was the fifth son, amongst the twenty-one children, of Sir Henry Beaumont, 2nd Baronet, of Stoughton Grange and Cole Orton.

== Naval career ==
Of his early service in the navy there is no record: it was short and uneventful, and on 28 October 1688 he was appointed lieutenant of the Portsmouth. Six months later, 21 April 1689, he was appointed captain of HMS Centurion, which ship was lost in Plymouth Sound in a violent storm on 25 December of the same year. Although so young a captain, no blame attached to him. He was accordingly appointed, after some months, to HMS Dreadnought, and early in 1692 was transferred to HMS Rupert, in which ship he took part in the battle of Barfleur. He continued in the Rupert during the following year; and in 1694 commanded HMS Canterbury in the Mediterranean. In 1696 he commanded HMS Montague, in the fleet cruising in the English Channel and off Ushant, and was for a short time detached as commodore of an inshore squadron. He was afterwards transferred, at short intervals, to HMS Neptune, HMS Essex, and HMS Duke, whilst in command of the squadron off Dunkirk, during the remainder of 1696 and till the peace. In November 1698 he was appointed to HMS Resolution, and during the next year was senior officer at Spithead, with a special commission for commanding in chief and holding courts-martial (23 February 1699). In the end of August he was ordered to pay the ship off. He commissioned her again some months later, and continued in her for the next two years, for a great part of which time he lay in the Downs, commanding – as he wrote – "a number of ships of consequence, with no small trouble and a good deal of charge", on which he referred it to the lord high admiral, "if this does not require more than barely commanding as the eldest captain" (9 April 1702).

His application did not meet with immediate success; in June he was turned over to the Tilbury, and continued to command the squadron in the Downs, at the Nore, and in the North Sea, till, on 1 March 1702–3, he was promoted to rear-admiral, and directed to hoist his flag on board HMS Mary, then fitting out at Woolwich. His rank, not his service, was altered. During the summer he cruised in the North Sea and off Dunkirk, or convoyed the Baltic trade; on the approach of winter he returned to the Downs, where he anchored on 19 October. He was still there on 27 November, when the great storm of 1703 "o'er pale Britannia passed" hurled the ship on to the Goodwin Sands. One man on board survived, but every other soul, Beaumont included, was lost. The circumstances of his death have given to Beaumont's name a wider repute than his career as an officer would have otherwise entitled it to; his service throughout was creditable, without being distinguished; and the only remarkable point about it is that, after having held important commands, he attained flag-rank within fifteen years of his entry into the service, and when he was not yet thirty-four years of age.

== Family and legacy ==
Two younger brothers, who had also entered the navy, had previously died; one, William Villiers, a lieutenant, had died of fever in the West Indies, 17 July 1697; the other, Charles, was lost in the blowing up of the Carlisle, 19 September 1700; and their mother, Lady Beaumont, after the death of the rear-admiral, memorialised the queen, praying for relief. As Lady Beaumont's second son, George, who, on the death of his elder brother, had succeeded to the title and estates, was unmarried and appointed a lord commissioner of the admiralty in 1714, the implied statement that the family was dependent on Basil is curious. The petition, however, was successful, and a pension of £50 a year was granted to each of the six daughters.

Beaumont's portrait, by Michael Dahl, is in the Painted Hall at Greenwich, to which it was presented by King George IV; it is that of a comely young man. (Note: Official documents in the Public Record Office.)
