= James Gother =

Captain James Gother
- Died: 1696
- Military career
- Branch: Royal Navy
- Service years: 1688–1696
- Rank: Commodore
- Commands: HMS Woolwich; HMS Restoration; HMS Royal Katherine; Commander-in-Chief, The Nore
- Conflicts: Nine Years' War

Commodore James Gother (died 1696) was a Royal Navy officer who briefly served as Commander-in-Chief, The Thames from 7 April 1696 to 15 April 1696.

== Naval career ==
Promoted to captain in May 1689, Gother commanded, successively, the fourth-rate HMS Woolwich, the third-rate HMS Restoration and the second-rate HMS Royal Katherine. He was court-martialled for failing to intercept the privateer, Jean Bart, and for allowing him to slip through a blockade and into Dunkirk in 1691. He then saw action in HMS Restoration during the action at Barfleur in May 1692. He briefly served as Commander-in-Chief, The Thames from 7 April 1696 to 15 April 1696.
