= John Rudyard =

John Rudyard (frequently seen as Rudyerd) (c. 1650-c. 1718) was contracted to build the second Eddystone Lighthouse, following the destruction of the original building in the Great Storm of 1703. He was neither an architect nor professional engineer, but a silk merchant and a property developer. Rudyard owned a silk-merchanting shop on Ludgate Hill in London, and had substantial interests in a variety of properties. A full biographical account of Rudyard's family background and career is contained in the second edition (2005) of Mike Palmer's account of the Eddystone Lighthouse.

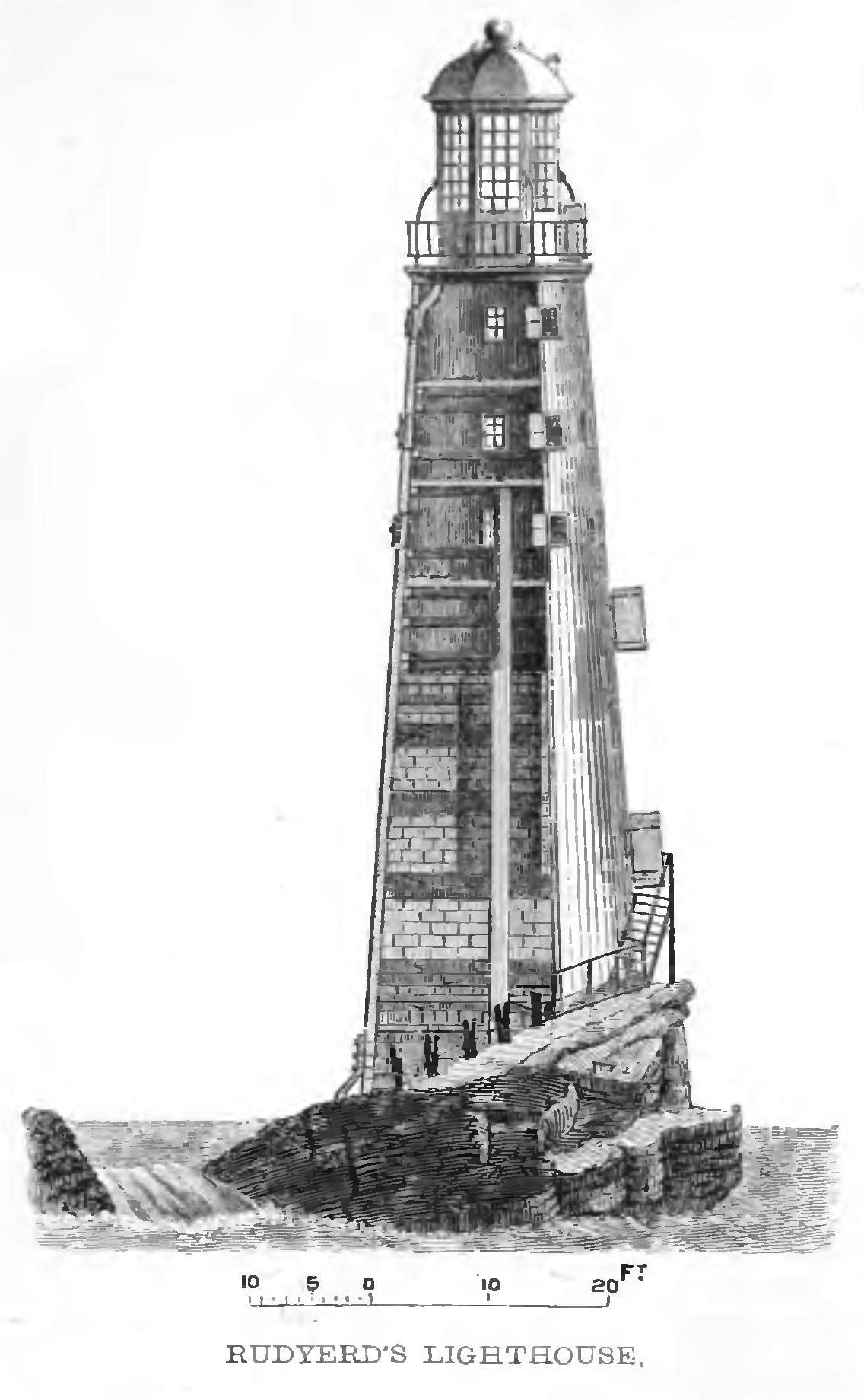
Elevation of Rudyard's lighthouse finished in 1709

A contemporary painting of Rudyard's lighthouse by Isaac Sailmaker.

John Rudyard, which is the correct original spelling of the family name, was born in the village of Leek, Staffordshire, and baptised on 22 April 1650. The name is spelt Rudyerd in the Leek baptismal register. He was a son of the second wife of Anthony Rudyard of Delacres Abbey, Staffordshire, earlier known as Dieulacres Abbey. The Rudyard family at this time were wealthy landowners. They also owned a well-respected silk trading business, which employed many people of the local area.

John Rudyard was brought into the family trade by starting his training in London at the age of 16, working for the next seven years, until 1673, for a Master named Robert Morris, engaged in the importing of furs, cottons and silks, and in tailoring. On completion of his apprenticeship with the Skinners Company, he married a woman named Sarah Jackman on 14 December 1674, at St Andrew's Church, Holborn, London. John and Sarah ran a shop on Ludgate Hill, provided for them by Thomas Jackman, Sarah's father. They had a daughter, named Sarah, in 1677. Records during the late 17th century show that John Rudyard was in a variety of legal partnerships with Thomas Jackman, relating to properties in and around London.

In a document of contract between John Lovett and John Rudyard, Citizen and Skinner of London, dated 19 June 1706, it is stated that Rudyard was to have sole management and building of the proposed new Eddystone Lighthouse, and that he was to receive £250 pa from the dues for his lifetime, and that of his wife Sarah. Rudyard surrendered all claims in a document dated 17 November 1709. John Lovett died on 24 April 1710, and it is clear that many financial problems in connection with the building of the lighthouse remained unresolved at this time.

The evidence is that John Rudyard was still alive in 1716, since he was named as a lease owner of a syndicate headed by Robert Harcourt Weston, who purchased the Lovett Eddystone lease at auction in that year for £8000. It is probable that Rudyard died on 20 November 1718, and his widow the following year, and that both were buried in St Andrew's Church, Holborn.

The account of John Rudyard as a poverty-stricken Cornish youth is a fiction, which has been uncritically repeated in many reference books.
