= English ship Speaker (1650) =

Third-rate of the navy of the Commonwealth of England

Coordinates: 51°15′38″N 01°30′2″E

History

Commonwealth of England
- Name: Speaker
- Namesake: William Lenthall, Speaker of the House of Commons
- Owner: British government
- Builder: Christopher Pett (Woolwich)
- Launched: 1650

History

England
- Name: HMS Mary
- Namesake: Henrietta Maria
- Acquired: 1660
- Fate: Wrecked, 1703

General characteristics as built
- Class & type: Speaker-class
- Tons burthen: 727
- Length: 116 ft (35.4 m) (keel)
- Beam: 34 ft 8 in (10.6 m)
- Depth of hold: 14 ft 6 in (4.4 m)
- Propulsion: Sails
- Sail plan: Full-rigged ship
- Armament: 50 guns (at launch); 62 guns (1677)

General characteristics after 1688 rebuild
- Class & type: 62-gun third-rate ship of the line
- Tons burthen: 829
- Length: 143 ft 3 in (43.7 m) (gundeck)
- Beam: 36 ft 8 in (11.2 m)
- Depth of hold: 14 ft 6 in (4.4 m)
- Propulsion: Sails
- Sail plan: Full-rigged ship
- Armament: 62 guns of various weights of shot

The English ship Speaker was a 50-gun third-rate. Speaker was built for the navy of the Commonwealth of England by Christopher Pett at Woolwich Dockyard and launched in 1650. At the Restoration she was renamed HMS Mary. She was the prototype of the Speaker-class.

In 1688, HMS Mary was rebuilt by Thomas Shish at Woolwich Dockyard as a 62-gun third-rate ship of the line. The ship was wrecked on the Goodwin Sands in the Great Storm of 1703. Almost all who were aboard were drowned, including Rear-Admiral Basil Beaumont.

== Description and early history ==
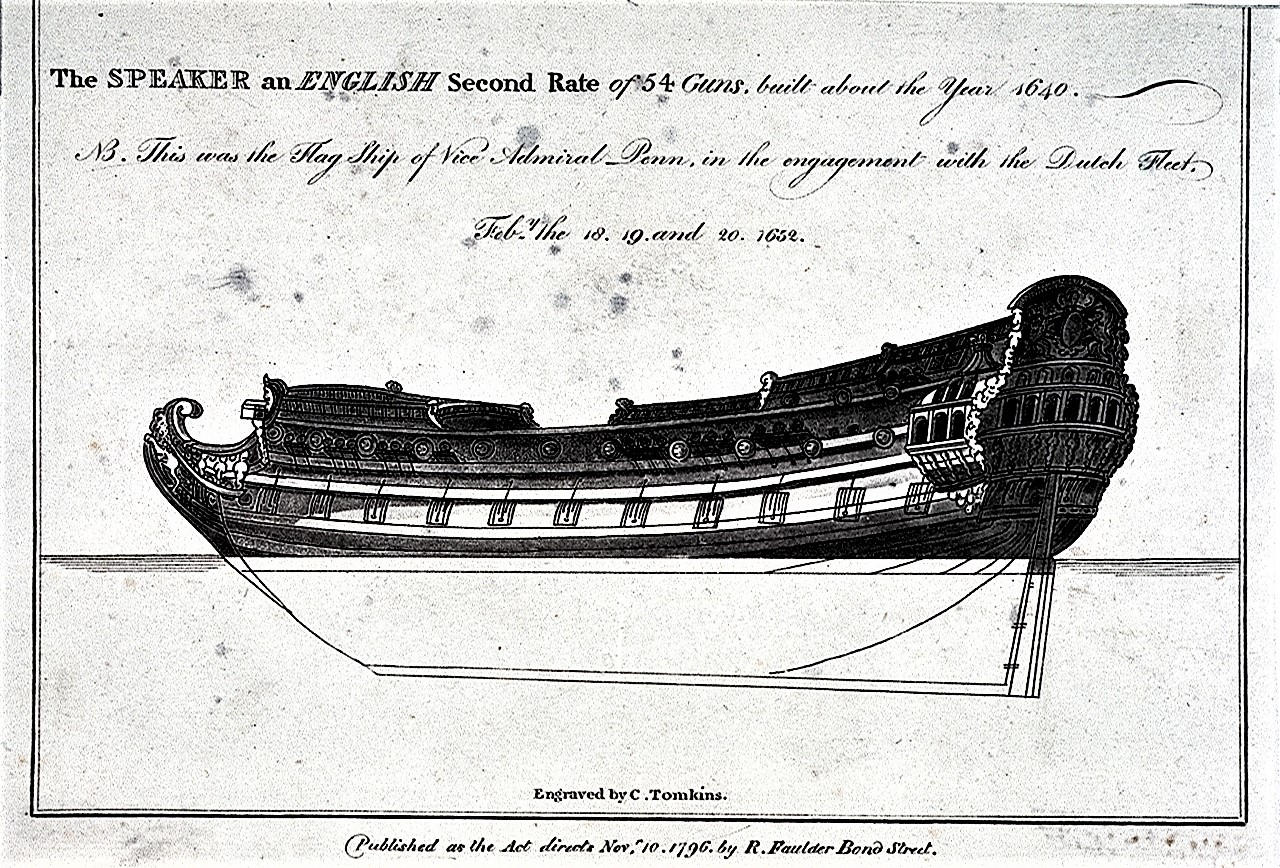
Charles Tomkins's 1796 engraving of Speaker

The English ship Speaker was a 50-gun third-rate and the name ship of the Speaker-class. She was built by Christopher Pett, as one of a pair of flagships for the Winter Guard of the navy of the Commonwealth of England. (Note: The other flagship was Fairfax.) Built at Woolwich Dockyard, she was launched in 1650.

Speaker's tonnage was 727 tons burthen. She had a length of 143 feet (43.6 m), and two decks, designed to accommodate the admiral and his officers. The ship had a breadth of 34 feet 4 inches (10.5 m). Originally designed to have 44 guns, the armament was increased to 50 guns in October 1649, and 56 guns by 1653. This was increased again to 60 guns between 1655 and 1660.

Speaker participated in the Battle of the Gabbard in 1653, being large enough to serve as the flagship for Rear Admiral Samuel Howett in the Rear division of the Red squadron.

== Restoration of Charles II ==
Speaker was part of the fleet led by Naseby, London, Richard, and Swiftsure who collected Charles II of England from Holland and brought him back from exile. Charles renamed Speaker HMS Mary.

== Post-Restoration career ==
At the Restoration, Speaker was renamed HMS Mary. By 1677 her armament had been increased to 62 guns.

In 1688, Mary was rebuilt by Thomas Shish at Woolwich Dockyard as a 62-gun third-rate ship of the line. Mary was wrecked on the Goodwin Sands in the Great Storm of 1703. Of her 275 crew, her captain and purser were ashore at the time of her loss; only one sailor on board survived. Rear-Admiral Basil Beaumont was also aboard ship at the time and perished in the wreck.

== Wreck site ==
Local divers found the wreck site in 1980. The initial designation was of 50 metres (160 ft) around what is now known as the South Mound; the North Mound was discovered in 1999 and the area was amended under Statutory Instrument number 2004/2395 as a 300 metres (980 ft) radius around 51° 15.6302' N, 01° 30.0262' E.

It is believed that Mary lies under the South Mound and the North Mound is probably the third rate HMS Restoration that was wrecked in the same storm. The site lies 100 metres (330 ft) to the west of the Goodwin Sands off Deal, between the wrecks of HMS Stirling Castle and HMS Northumberland, which also sank in the storm.

The site was investigated by Wessex Archaeology on 25 June 2006. The South Mound measures 28 by 12 metres (92 ft × 39 ft) but has not been studied in detail.

== Legacy ==
Mary could be considered as the first example of a ship of the line. Although it was built before the concept of a ship of the line was developed, it some of the characteristics of such a ship.

== Sources ==
- Larn, Richard (1977). Goodwin Sands Shipwrecks. Newton Abbot, London, North Pomfret: David & Charles. ISBN 0-7153-7202-5.
- Lavery, Brian (1983). The Ship of the Line. Vol. 1: The Development of the Battlefleet 1650–1850. Conway Maritime Press. ISBN 978-0-85177-252-3.
- Winfield, Rif (2009). British Warships in the Age of Sail 1603–1714: design, construction, careers and fates. Barnsley, UK: Seaforth Publishing. ISBN 978-1-84832-040-6.
