= HMS Windsor Castle (1679) =

Ship of the line of the Royal Navy

History

England
- Name: HMS Windsor Castle
- Ordered: 5 May 1677
- Builder: Thomas Shish, Woolwich Dockyard
- Launched: 4 March 1679
- Commissioned: 1690
- Fate: Wrecked, 28 April 1693

General characteristics
- Class & type: 90-gun second rate ship of the line
- Tons burthen: 1325 bm
- Length: 125 ft 7 in (38.3 m) (keel)
- Beam: 44 ft 6.5 in (13.6 m)
- Depth of hold: 18 ft 3 in (5.6 m)
- Propulsion: Sails
- Sail plan: Full-rigged ship
- Armament: 90 guns of various weights of shot

HMS Windsor Castle was a 90-gun second rate ship of the line of the English Royal Navy, built by Thomas Shish at Woolwich Dockyard, and launched in 1679.

Windsor Castle commissioned in 1690 under Captain George Churchill and took part in the Battle of Beachy Head on 30 June 1690. In 1692 she was under the command of Captain Peregrine Osborne, and took part in the Battle of Barfleur on 19–24 May 1692. In 1693 she was commanded by Captain John Munden, but was wrecked on Goodwin Sands on 28 April 1693.
