= HMS Royal James (1660) =

Ship of the line of the Royal Navy

Coordinates: 51°23′5.93″N 0°31′0.07″E

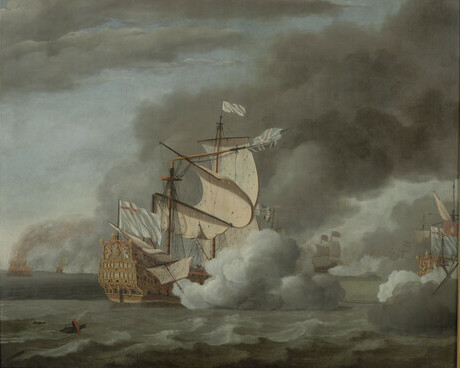
- Towing the Royal James during the Four Days Battle, 1666, by Willem van de Velde the Younger.jpg

History

England
- Name: Richard
- Ordered: 8 April 1656
- Builder: Christopher Pett, Woolwich
- Launched: 26 May 1658
- Commissioned: 1658
- Renamed: HMS Royal James on 23 May 1660
- Honours and awards: Battle of Lowestoft, 1665; Four Days Battle, 1666; St James's Day Fight, 1666.
- Fate: Burnt by the Dutch, 14 June 1667

General characteristics
- Class & type: 70-gun second-rate ship of the line
- Tons burthen: 1,10870/94 bm
- Length: 124 ft (37.8 m) (keel)
- Beam: 41 ft (12.5 m)
- Draught: 21 ft (6.4 m)
- Depth of hold: 18 ft (5.5 m)
- Sail plan: Full-rigged ship
- Complement: 400 in 1660; later 550.
- Armament: 70 guns of various weights of shot, later increased to 82

The Richard was a 70-gun second-rate ship of the line of the navy of the Commonwealth of England, built by the Master Shipwright Christopher Pett at Woolwich Dockyard, and launched in 1658. She was named after Richard Cromwell, to honour his appointment as the Protector in succession to his late father Oliver Cromwell.

The Richard was one of four Second rates authorised by the Council of State on 3 July 1654 as part of the 1654 Construction Programme; unlike the other three, the instruction to build her was not placed until 8 April 1656; she was launched from Woolwich Dockyard on 26 May 1658. She had 13 pairs of gunports on the lower deck (one pair unused), 13 pairs on the middle deck, and 10 pairs on the upper deck. She was first fitted with 70 guns, but by 1664 this has increased to 78 guns, comprising 12 cannon-of-seven (42-pounders), 14 demi-cannon, 28 culverins and 26 demi-culverins (including 4 demi-culverin cutts).

After the Restoration of the monarchy in 1660, she was taken into the Royal Navy, with her name changed to HMS Royal James on 23 May 1660, and she was re-registered as a first rate ship of the line in the Royal Navy. This involved adding an additional 2 pairs of gunports in the waist on the upper deck, where previously she had carried no guns, plus 7 pairs of gunports on the quarterdeck, 2 pairs on the forecastle and another 2 pairs on the poop for lighter guns; consequently her rating was raised to 82 guns, with the 42-pounders on the lower deck replaced by 10 more demi-cannon, but with extra demi-culverins on her higher decks.

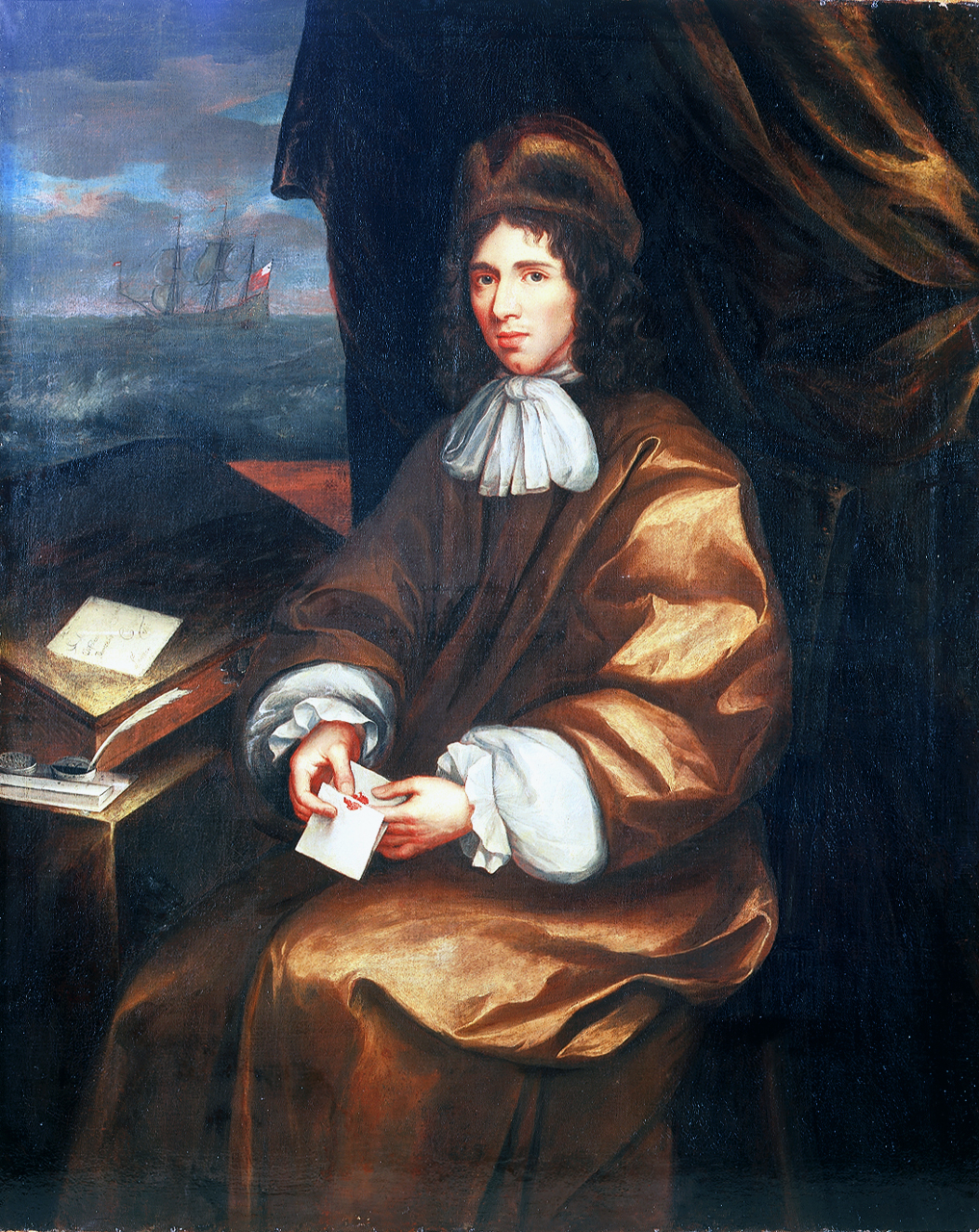
Charles Weston, 3rd Earl of Portland, serving on her as a volunteer was killed at Lowestoft

She took part in all three major naval battles of the Second Dutch War. At the Battle of Lowestoft on 3 June 1665, she was the flagship of Prince Rupert, a role she reprised a year later during the Four Days Battle on 4 June 1666. She also took part in the St James's Day Fight on 25 July 1666.

She was present at the raid on the Medway in 1667, where first she was sunk to prevent capture, and then those parts above water burnt by the Dutch fireships.
