= HMS Restoration (1678) =

Ship of the line of the Royal Navy

Coordinates: 51°15′42″N 01°30′3″E

History

England
- Name: HMS Restoration
- Ordered: April 1677
- Builder: Harwich Dockyard
- Launched: 25 May 1678
- Commissioned: 15 May 1678
- Honours and awards: Barfleur 1692
- Fate: Wrecked, 27 November 1703 on the Goodwin Sands.

General characteristics as built
- Class & type: 70-gun third-rate ship of the line
- Tons burthen: 1,02191/94 tons (bm)
- Length: 150 ft 6 in (45.87 m) gundeck; 120 ft 7 in (36.75 m) keel for tonnage
- Beam: 39 ft 11 in (12.17 m)
- Draught: 18 ft 0 in (5.49 m)
- Depth of hold: 17 ft 0 in (5.18 m)
- Propulsion: Sails
- Sail plan: Full-rigged ship
- Armament: 1685 Establishment 70/62 guns; 26 × demi-cannons 54 cwt – 9.5 ft (LD); 26 × demi-culverins (UD); 10 × sakers 16 cwt – 7 ft (QD); 4 × sakers 16 cwt – 7 ft (Fc); 5 × 5 3-pdr guns 5 cwt – 5 ft (RH)

General characteristics after 1699/1702 rebuild
- Class & type: 70-gun third-rate ship of the line
- Tons burthen: 1,04464/94 tons (bm)
- Length: 150 ft 9 in (45.95 m) gundeck; 150 ft 9 in (45.95 m) keel for tonnage
- Beam: 40 ft 0 in (12.19 m)
- Depth of hold: 17 ft 0 in (5.18 m)
- Propulsion: Sails
- Sail plan: Full-rigged ship
- Armament: 1685 Establishment 70/62 guns; 26 × demi-cannons 54 cwt – 9.5 ft (LD); 26 × demi-culverins (UD); 10 × sakers 16 cwt – 7 ft (QD); 4 × sakers 16 cwt – 7 ft (Fc); 5 × 5 3-pdr guns 5 cwt – 5 ft (RH)

HMS Restoration was a 70-gun third rate of the Kingdom of England built at Harwich Dockyard in 1677/78. After a ten-year stint in Ordinary she was commissioned for the War of the English Succession in 1690. She fought in the Battles of Beachy Head and the Battle of Barfleur. She was rebuilt at Portsmouth in 1699/1702. She was lost on the Goodwin Sands during the Great Storm of November 1703.

This was the first vessel to bear the name Restoration in the English and Royal Navy.

HMS Restoration was awarded the Battle Honour Barfleur 1692.

== Construction and specifications ==
She was ordered in April 1677 to be built at Harwich Dockyard under the guidance of Master Shipwright Isaac Betts (from 26 May 1677). She was launched on 25 May 1678. Her dimensions were a gundeck of 150 feet 6 inches (45.87 metres) with a keel of 120 feet 7 inches (36.75 metres) for tonnage calculation with a breadth of 39 feet 11 inches (12.17 metres) and a depth of hold of 17 feet 0 inches (5.18 metres). Her builder's measure tonnage was calculated as 1,02191/94 tons (burthen). Her draught was 18 feet 0 inches (5.49 metres).

Her initial gun armament was in accordance with the 1677 Establishment with 72/60 guns consisting of twenty-six demi-cannons (54 cwt, (Note: "cwt", or "hundredweight" refers to the weight of the gun itself) 9.5 ft) on the lower deck, twenty-four 12-pounder guns (32 cwt, 9 ft) on the upper deck, ten sakers (16 cwt, 7 ft) on the quarterdeck and four sakers (16 cwt, 7 ft) on the foc's'le with four 3-pounder guns (5 cwt, 5 ft) on the poop deck or roundhouse. By 1688 she would carry 70 guns as per the 1685 Establishment, however, the demi-culverins replaced the 12-pounders on the upper deck . Her initial manning establishment would be for a crew of 460/380/300 personnel.

== Commissioned service ==
=== Service 1678 to 1699 ===
She was commissioned on 15 May 1678 under the command of Captain John Brookes until his death on 3 August 1678. In 1690 she was under command of Captain William Botham for the Battle of Beachy Head in Centre (Red) Squadron on 30 June 1690, where Captain Botham was killed. After the battle Captain Edward Stanley was appointed her commander. In 1691 she was under Captain James Gother for the Battle of Barfleur in Centre (Red) Squadron, Centre Division from 19 to 22 May 1692. Later in the year of 1692 she was under Captain Benjamin Hoskins until 1693 then he was followed by Captain Humphrey Saunders. During 1694 she was under Captain William Cross. During 1696/98 she was under Captain Thomas Foulis sailing with the Fleet. She would be rebuilt at Portsmouth in 1702.

=== Rebuild at Portsmouth 1699-1702 ===
She was ordered rebuilt on 25 February 1699 at Portsmouth under the guidance of Master Shipwright Elias Waffe. She was launched/completed on 22 January 1702. Her dimensions were a gundeck of 150 feet 9 inches (45.95 metres) with a keel of 122 feet 9 inches (37.41 metres) for tonnage calculation with a breadth of 40 feet 0 inches (12.19 metres) and a depth of hold of 17 feet 0 inches (5.18 metres). Her builder's measure tonnage was calculated as 1,04464/94 tons (burthen). She probably retained her armament as stated in the 1685 Establishment, though it is unclear if her armament was changed to the 1703 Establishment later. It is known that when completed her gun armament total at least 70 guns.

=== Service 1702-03 ===
She was commissioned in 1702 under the command of Captain Robert Fairfax. In January 1703 she was temporarily under the command of Captain Edward Whitaker followed by Captain Fleetwood Ernes a few days later.

== Loss ==
During the Great Storm of 26/27 November 1703, Restoration was wrecked on the Goodwin Sands. All 387 (some references say 391) men were lost, including Captain Fleetwood Ernes. The wreck is a Protected Wreck managed by Historic England. "Details from listed building database (1000057)". National Heritage List for England..

== Wreck ==
Local divers found the wreck site in 1980. The initial designation was of 50 around what is now known as the South Mound; the North Mound was discovered in 1999 and the area was amended under Statutory Instrument number 2004/2395 as a 300 m radius around 51° 15.6302' N, 01° 30.0262' E. It is believed that the Restoration lies under the North Mound and the South Mound is the fourth rate HMS Mary wrecked in the same storm, but this is not known for certain. The site lies 100 m to the west of the Goodwin Sands off Deal, near the wrecks of HMS Stirling Castle and HMS Northumberland which also sank in the storm.

The site was investigated by Wessex Archaeology on 25 June 2006. They found copper-clad timbers, a cannon, lead pipes and hearth bricks.
