= Great storm of 1703 =

English extratropical cyclone

Coordinates: 51°N 1°W

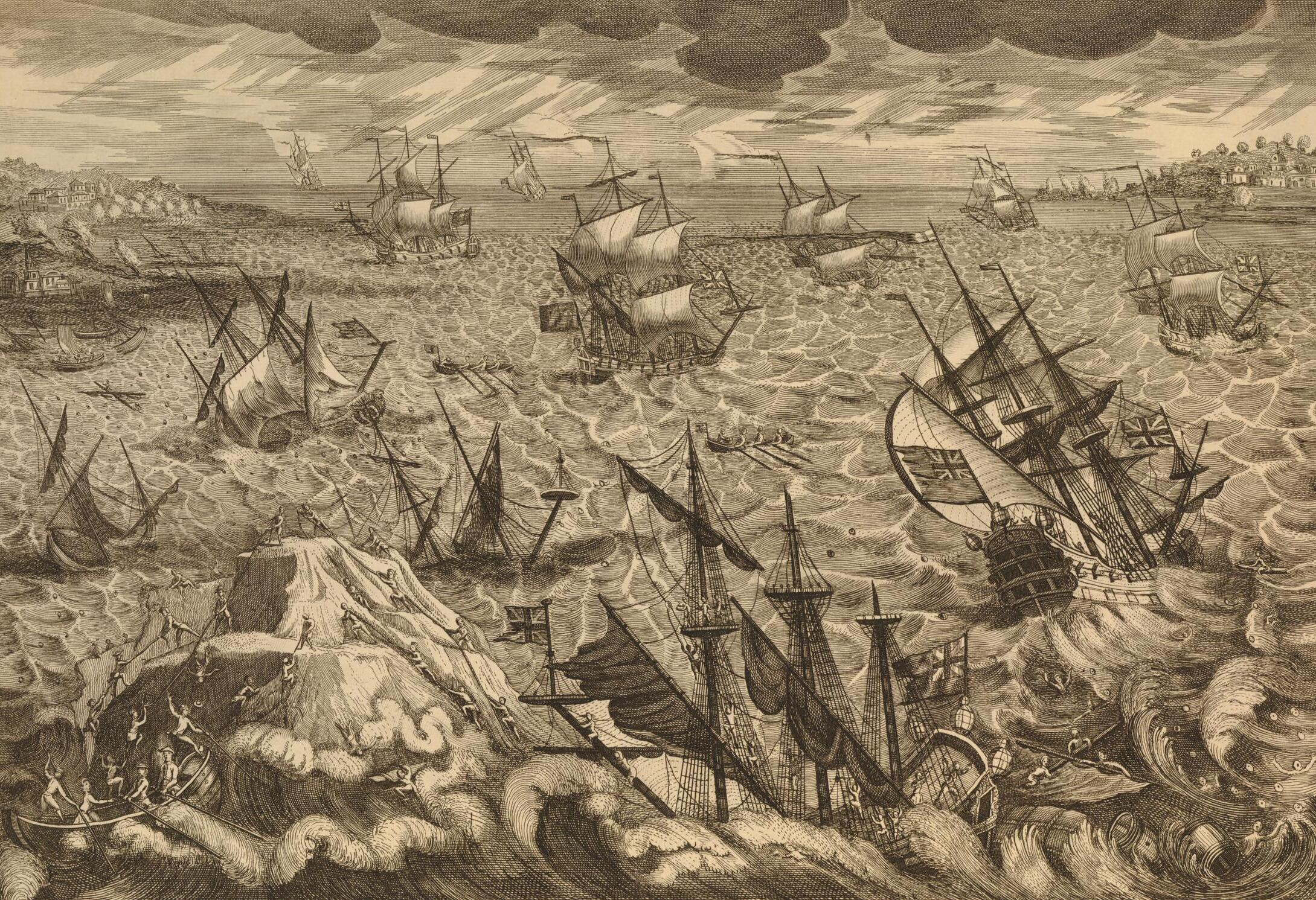
- 1739 illustration of the storm

Meteorological history
- Dissipated: 10 December 1703 N.S. (29 November 1703 O.S.)

Extratropical cyclone
- Lowest pressure: 990 hPa (mbar); 29.23 inHg

Overall effects
- Fatalities: >8,000
- Areas affected: England, Wales, Netherlands, France, Belgium, Germany

The Great storm of 1703 was a destructive extratropical cyclone that struck south Wales and central and southern England on 26 November 1703. High winds caused 2,000 chimney stacks to collapse in London and damaged the New Forest, which lost 4,000 oaks. Ships were blown hundreds of miles off-course, and over 1,000 seamen died on the Goodwin Sands alone. News bulletins of casualties and damage were sold all over England and Wales – a novelty at that time. The Church of England declared that the storm was God's vengeance for the sins of the nation.

== Severity ==
William Derham in south Essex recorded barometric readings down to 973 millibars (973 hPa), but it has been suggested that the storm deepened to 950 millibars (950 hPa) over the Midlands.

Modern-day reanalysis reconstructed the wind fields of the storms and identified multiple, repeating sting jets bringing winds of up to 110 mph across southern Britain.

== Damage ==
In London alone, approximately 2,000 massive chimney stacks were blown down. The lead roofing was blown off Westminster Abbey and Queen Anne had to shelter in a cellar at St James's Palace to avoid collapsing chimneys and part of the roof. On the Thames, some 700 ships were heaped together in the Pool of London, the section downstream from London Bridge. Huge waves on the Thames river sent water six feet (1.8 m) higher than had ever been recorded in London, destroying more than 5,000 homes along the river. HMS Vanguard was wrecked at Chatham. Admiral Sir Cloudesley Shovell's HMS Association was blown from Harwich to Gothenburg in Sweden before way could be made back to England.

There was extensive and prolonged flooding in the West Country, particularly around Bristol. Hundreds of people drowned in flooding on the Somerset Levels, along with thousands of sheep and cattle, and one ship was found 15 miles (24 km) inland.

At sea, many ships were wrecked, some of which were returning from helping Archduke Charles, the claimed King of Spain, fight the French in the War of the Spanish Succession. These ships included HMS Stirling Castle, HMS Northumberland, HMS Mary and HMS Restoration, with about 1,500 seamen killed, particularly on the Goodwin Sands. At least 8,000 were said to have died overall. In total, around 300 Royal Navy ships anchored along the south coast were lost.

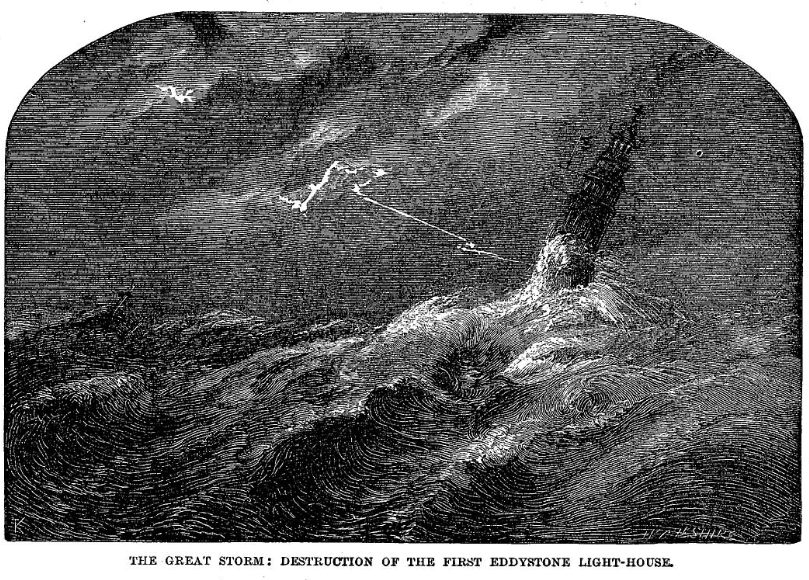
Destruction of the first Eddystone Lighthouse in the Great Storm of 1703

The first Eddystone Lighthouse off Plymouth was destroyed on 8 December [O.S. 27 November], killing six occupants, including its builder, Henry Winstanley. (John Rudyard was later contracted to build the second lighthouse on the site.) Two days later, a cargo ship struck the rocks and sank. She was the first wrecking to occur there since the lighthouse was constructed five years prior. Another ship, torn from its moorings in the Helford River in Cornwall, was blown for 200 miles (320 km) before grounding eight hours later on the Isle of Wight. The storm also caught a convoy of 130 merchant ships sheltering at Milford Haven, along with their man of war escorts Dolphin, Cumberland, Coventry, Looe, Hastings and Hector. By 3:00pm the next afternoon, losses included 30 vessels.

The number of oak trees lost in the New Forest alone was 4,000. The towns of Plymouth, Hull, Cowes, Portsmouth and Bristol were devastated.

== Reaction ==
The storm was unprecedented in ferocity and duration and was generally reckoned by witnesses to represent the anger of God, in recognition of the "crying sins of this nation". The government declared 19 January 1704 a day of fasting, saying that it "loudly calls for the deepest and most solemn humiliation of our people". It remained a frequent topic of moralising in sermons well into the 19th century.

=== Literary ===
Daniel Defoe produced his full-length book The Storm (July 1704) in response to the calamity, calling it "the tempest that destroyed woods and forests all over England". He wrote: "No pen could describe it, nor tongue express it, nor thought conceive it unless by one in the extremity of it." Coastal towns such as Portsmouth "looked as if the enemy had sackt them and were most miserably torn to pieces". Winds of up to 80 miles per hour (130 km/h) destroyed more than 400 windmills. Defoe reported that the sails in some turned so fast that the friction between the wooden brakes and the wheel caused the wood to overheat and catch fire. He thought that the destruction of the sovereign fleet was a punishment for their poor performance against the Catholic armies of France and Spain during the first year of the War of the Spanish Succession.

== Naval losses ==
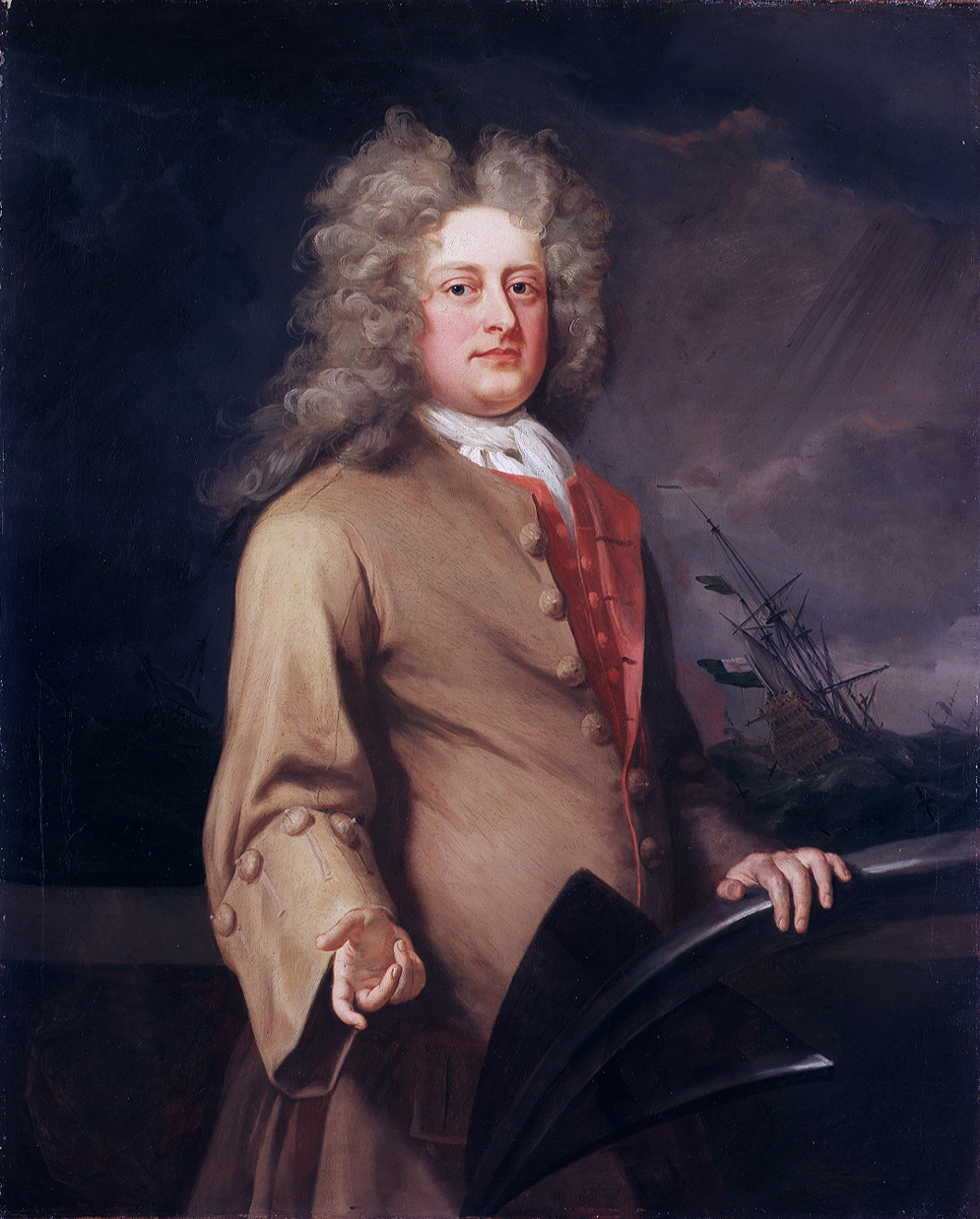
Rear-Admiral Basil Beaumont was the most senior naval officer killed by the storm. Painting by Michael Dahl, early 18th century

In the English Channel, fierce winds and high seas swamped some vessels outright and drove others onto the Goodwin Sands, an extensive sand bank off the southeast coast of England and the traditional anchorage for ships waiting either for passage up the Thames Estuary to London or for favourable winds to take them out into the Channel and the Atlantic Ocean. The Royal Navy was badly affected, losing thirteen ships including the entire Channel Squadron, and upwards of 1,500 seamen drowned.

- The third-rate HMS Restoration was wrecked on the Goodwin Sands; all 387 of the ship's company were lost.
- The third-rate HMS Northumberland was lost on the Goodwin Sands; all 220 men, including 24 marines, were killed.
- The third-rate (battleship) HMS Stirling Castle was wrecked on the Goodwin Sands. Seventy men, including four marine officers, were saved, but 206 men were drowned.
- The fourth-rate HMS Mary was wrecked on the Goodwin Sands. The captain and the purser were ashore, but Rear Admiral Beaumont and 268 other men were drowned. Only one man, Thomas Atkins, was saved. His escape was remarkable – having first seen the rear admiral get onto a piece of her quarterdeck when the ship was breaking up, and then get washed off again, Atkins was tossed by a wave into the Stirling Castle, which sank soon after. From the Stirling Castle he was swept into a boat by a wave, and was rescued.
- The fifth-rate Mortar-bomb was wrecked on the Goodwin Sands and her entire company of 65 lost.
- The sixth-rate advice boat Eagle was lost on the coast of Sussex, but her ship's company of 45 were all saved.
- The third-rate Resolution was lost at Pevensey on the coast of Sussex; all her ship's company of 221 were saved.
- The fifth-rate Litchfield Prize was wrecked on the coast of Sussex; all 108 on board were saved.
- The fourth-rate Newcastle was lost at Spithead. The carpenter and 39 men were saved, and the other 193 were drowned.
- The fifth-rate fire-ship Vesuvius was lost at Spithead; all 48 of her ship's company were saved.
- The fourth-rate Reserve was lost by foundering off Yarmouth. The captain, the surgeon, the clerk and 44 men were saved; the other 175 members of the crew were drowned.
- The second-rate Vanguard was sunk in Chatham harbour. She was not manned and had no armament fitted; the following year she was raised for rebuilding.
- The fourth-rate York was lost at Harwich; all but four of her men were saved.

Shrewsbury narrowly escaped a similar fate. More than 40 merchant ships were also lost.

Lamb (1991) claimed 10,000 seamen were lost in one night—a far higher figure—about one-third of the seamen in the Royal Navy. Defoe's The Storm suggests that the Royal Navy lost one-fifth of its ships; this would, however, indicate a much lower proportion of seamen were lost, as some wrecked sailors survived.

== Date: old style ==
The date of 26 November is according to the Julian calendar, still in use in 1703. In today's Gregorian calendar, the date would be 7 December.

== See also ==
- Great storm of 1987
- List of disasters in Great Britain and Ireland by death toll
- United Kingdom weather records
