= HMS Duchess (1679) =

Ship of the line of the Royal Navy

History

Great Britain
- Name: HMS Duchess
- Builder: John Shish, Deptford Dockyard
- Launched: May 1679
- Renamed: HMS Princess Anne, 1701; HMS Windsor Castle, 1702; HMS Blenheim, 1706
- Fate: Broken up, 1763

General characteristics as built
- Class & type: 90-gun second rate ship of the line
- Tons burthen: 1546 bm
- Length: 162 ft 8 in (49.6 m) (gundeck)
- Beam: 45 ft 8 in (13.9 m)
- Depth of hold: 18 ft 4 in (5.6 m)
- Propulsion: Sails
- Sail plan: Full-rigged ship
- Armament: 90 guns of various weights of shot

General characteristics after 1709 rebuild
- Class & type: 90-gun second rate ship of the line
- Tons burthen: 1557 bm
- Length: 162 ft 2.75 in (49.4 m) (gundeck)
- Beam: 47 ft 2.25 in (14.4 m)
- Depth of hold: 18 ft 10.25 in (5.7 m)
- Propulsion: Sails
- Sail plan: Full-rigged ship
- Armament: 90 guns of various weights of shot

HMS Duchess was a 90-gun second rate ship of the line of the Royal Navy, built by John Shish at Deptford Dockyard, and launched in May 1679.

During the Nine Years' War, the Duchess took part in the Battle of Beachy Head in 1690 and the Battle of Barfleur in 1692.

In 1696, the Duchess was lying in the Thames when passed by famed privateer Capt. William Kidd in the Adventure Galley. Kidd failed to offer the customary salute to the Duchess, and the irate Captain Stewart of the Duchess fired a shot off Kidd's bow, forcing Kidd (surrounded by a "forest of Royal Navy warships") to heave to and be boarded. Stewart then impressed 30 of Kidd's best hand-picked seamen. One of Kidd's influential backers came to his aid, getting Stewart to replace the impressed sailors, but rather than returning Kidd's original crew, he substituted his worst troublemakers.

The Duchess was renamed HMS Princess Anne in 1701, HMS Windsor Castle in 1702, and HMS Blenheim in 1706; the last to commemorate the Duke of Marlborough's victory at the Battle of Blenheim in 1704.

In 1709 Blenheim was rebuilt at Woolwich Dockyard, remaining a 90-gun second rate. She continued to serve until 1763, when she was broken up.
