= HMS Vanguard (1678) =

Ship of the line of the Royal Navy

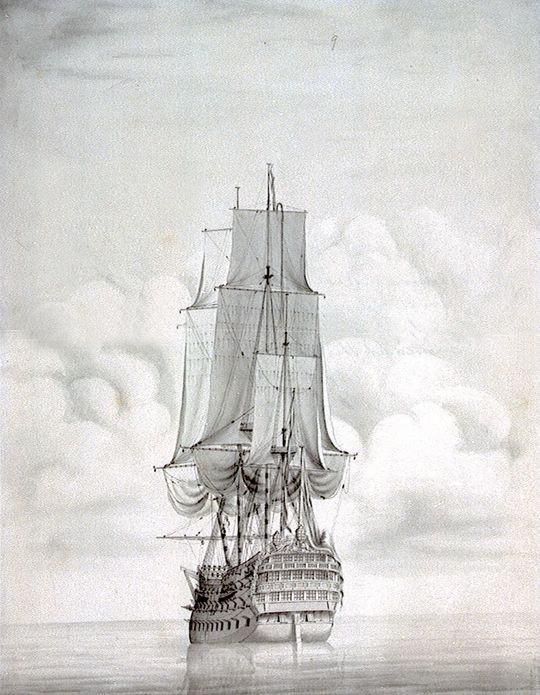
- HMS Vanguard as Duke, ca. 1750

History

Great Britain
- Name: HMS Vanguard
- Builder: Furzer, Portsmouth Dockyard
- Launched: 1678
- Renamed: HMS Duke, 1739
- Fate: Broken up, 1769
- Notes: Participated in: Battle of Barfleur; Battle of La Hogue

General characteristics as built
- Class & type: 90-gun second-rate ship of the line
- Tons burthen: 1,482
- Length: 160 ft (48.8 m) (gundeck)
- Beam: 44 ft (13.4 m)
- Depth of hold: 18 ft 5 in (5.6 m)
- Propulsion: Sails
- Sail plan: Full-rigged ship
- Armament: 90 guns of various weights of shot

General characteristics after 1710 rebuild
- Class & type: 1706 Establishment 90-gun second-rate ship of the line
- Tons burthen: 1,551
- Length: 162 ft (49.4 m) (gundeck)
- Beam: 47 ft (14.3 m)
- Depth of hold: 18 ft 6 in (5.6 m)
- Sail plan: Full-rigged ship
- Armament: 90 guns: Gundeck: 26 × 32 pdrs; Middle gundeck: 26 × 18 pdrs; Upper gundeck: 26 × 9 pdrs; Quarterdeck: 10 × 6 pdrs; Forecastle: 2 × 6 pdrs

General characteristics after 1739 rebuild
- Class & type: 1733 proposals 90-gun second rate ship of the line
- Tons burthen: 1,625
- Length: 174 ft (53.0 m) (gundeck)
- Beam: 50 ft (15.2 m)
- Depth of hold: 20 ft 6 in (6.2 m)
- Sail plan: Full-rigged ship
- Armament: 90 guns: Gundeck: 26 × 32 pdrs; Middle gundeck: 26 × 18 pdrs; Upper gundeck: 26 × 9 pdrs; Quarterdeck: 10 × 6 pdrs; Forecastle: 2 × 6 pdrs

HMS Vanguard was a 90-gun second-rate ship of the line of the Royal Navy, built at Portsmouth Dockyard and launched in 1678.

She ran onto Goodwin Sands in 1690, but was fortunate enough to be hauled off by the boatmen of Deal.

Vanguard took part in the Battle of Barfleur as part of Edward Russell's fleet, and then in the following action at La Hougue when French ships were burned in 1692.

Vanguard sank in the Great Storm of 1703, while laid up in ordinary at Chatham Dockyard, but was raised in 1704 for rebuilding. She was relaunched from Chatham on 2 August 1710 as a 90-gun second rate built to the 1706 Establishment. In 1739 she was renamed HMS Duke, and rebuilt for a second time at Woolwich as a 90-gun second rate. She was rebuilt according to the 1733 proposals of the 1719 Establishment, and relaunched on 28 April 1739.

In 1759, Duke, with a ship's complement of 800 souls under the command of Captain Samuel Graves, saw action during the Battle of Quiberon Bay.

Duke was broken up in 1769.
