= HMS Northumberland (1679) =

Ship of the line of the Royal Navy

Coordinates: 51°15′29″N 01°30′01″E

History

England
- Name: HMS Northumberland
- Namesake: George Fitzroy, Duke of Northumberland
- Ordered: May 1677
- Builder: Baylie, Bristol
- Launched: June 1679
- Commissioned: 20 June 1679
- Honours and awards: Barfleur 1692; Vigo 1702
- Fate: Wrecked, 26/27 November 1703, on the Goodwin Sands

General characteristics as built
- Class & type: 70-gun third-rate ship of the line
- Tons burthen: 104123/94 tons (bm)
- Length: 151 ft 11.75 in (46.32 m) gundeck; 121 ft 4 in (36.98 m) keel for tonnage
- Beam: 40 ft 2 in (12.24 m)
- Draught: 18 ft (5.49 m)
- Depth of hold: 17 ft (5.18 m)
- Propulsion: Sails
- Sail plan: Full-rigged ship
- Armament: 1677 Establishment 72/60 guns; 26 × demi-cannons 54 cwt – 9.5 ft (LD); 26 × 12-pdr guns 32 cwt – 9 ft (UD); 10 × sakers 16 cwt – 7 ft (QD); 4 × sakers 16 cwt – 7 ft (Fc); 5 × 5 3-pdr guns 5 cwt – 5 ft (RH)
- Notes: her armament was unchanged by 1688, except she had demi-culverins in place of 12-pdr guns

General characteristics after 1702 rebuild
- Class & type: 70-gun third-rate ship of the line
- Tons burthen: 10965/94 tons (bm)
- Length: 152 ft 0 in (46.33 m) gundeck; 126 ft 8 in (38.61 m) keel for tonnage
- Beam: 40 ft 4 in (12.29 m)
- Depth of hold: 17 ft 3 in (5.26 m)
- Propulsion: Sails
- Sail plan: Full-rigged ship
- Armament: 72/60 guns unchanged from 1688

HMS Northumberland was a 70-gun third-rate ship of the line of the Royal Navy, built by Francis Bayley of Bristol in 1677/79. She partook in the last great battle of the War of English Succession and the first battle of the War of Spanish Succession. She was lost in the Great Storm of November 1703.

She was named in honour of Charles II's illegitimate son, George Fitzroy, his son with Barbara Palmer (Duchess of Cleveland). George Fitzroy was made the Duke of Northumberland in 1678. This was the first vessel to bear the name Northumberland in the English and Royal Navy.

HMS Northumberland was awarded the Battle Honours Barfleur 1692, and Vigo 1702.

== Construction and specifications ==
She was ordered in May 1677 to be built under contract by Francis Bayley of Bristol. Bayley died in March 1678 and his executor, Mr. Pope, completed the ship. She was launched in June 1679. Her dimensions were a gundeck of 151 ft 11.75 in (46.32 m) with a keel of 121 ft 4 in (36.98 m) for tonnage calculation with a breadth of 40 ft 2 in (12.24 m) and a depth of hold of 117 ft 0 in (35.66 m). Her builder's measure tonnage was calculated as 1,04123/94. Her draught was 18 ft 0 in (5.49 m).

Her initial gun armament was in accordance with the 1677 Establishment with 72/60 guns consisting of twenty-six demi-cannons (54 cwt, 9.5 ft) on the lower deck (LD), twenty-six 12-pounder guns (32 cwt, 9 ft) on the upper deck (UD), ten sakers (16 cwt, 7 ft) on the quarterdeck (QD), and four sakers (16 cwt, 7 ft) on the foc's'le (Fc), with four 3-pounder guns (5 cwt, 5 ft) on the poop deck or roundhouse (RH). By 1688 she would carry 70 guns as per the 1685 Establishment, but with demi-culverins in place of the 12-pounder guns.

== Commissioned service ==
=== Service from 1679 to 1699 ===
HMS Northumberland was commissioned on 20 June 1679 under the command of Captain John Wetwang until 20 September 1679 for delivery to Chatham. With the outbreak of the War of English Succession, she was commissioned in September 1690 under the command of Captain Andrew Cotton. She fought in the Battle of Barfleur in Rear (Blue) Squadron, Van Division from 19 to 22 May 1692. Captain Cotton was killed on 13 June 1693. In 1693 she was under Captain Henry Botelar, who was killed in a duel on 21 September 1693. In 1694 she was under Captain David Lambert sailing with Russell’s Fleet in the English Channel then moved on to the Mediterranean in October. In 1695 she was under Captain John Benbow participating in Lord Berkeley’s operations. In August 1695 she was under Captain Baron Wyld. Captain Christopher Fogge was her commander sailing with Lord Berkeley's Fleet. She would be rebuilt at Chatham in 1699/1702.

=== Rebuild at Chatham Dockyard 1699 to 1702 ===
She was ordered rebuilt on 14 September 1699 at Chatham Dockyard under the guidance of Master Shipwright Robert Shortiss. She was completed/launched in 1702. Her dimensions were a gundeck of 152 feet 0 inches (46.33 metres) with a keel of 126 feet 8 inches (38.61 metres) for tonnage calculation with a breadth of 40 ft 4 in (12.29 m) and a depth of hold of 17 feet 3 inches (5.26 metres). Her builder's measure tonnage was calculated as 1,0965/94 tons.

Her armament was under the 1703 Establishment was listed as 70 guns wartime / 62 guns peacetime consisting of twenty-four/twenty-two 24-pounder guns of 9.5 feet in length on the lower deck, twenty-six/twenty-four demi-culverins of 9-foot length on the upper deck, twelve/ten 6-pounder guns of 8.5-foot length on the quarterdeck, and four/two 6-pounder guns of (2/2) 9-foot length and (2/0) of 7.5-foot length, with four 5.5 foot 3-pounder guns on the poop deck or roundhouse. She may have carried her demi-cannons on the lower deck.

=== Service from 1702 to 1703 ===
HMS Northumberland was commissioned in 1702 under the command of Captain James Greenaway for service with Sir George Rooke’s Fleet for operations at Cadiz, Spain. The fleet sailed from Spithead on 19 July for St Helens Island in the Scillies. The arrived in the Bay of Bulls, north of Cadiz on the 12th of August. After the capture of Rota, Spain they destroyed the stores and departed for England on the 19th. After being informed of a French Fleet and Spanish treasure ships at Vigo Bay they sailed for the north-west coast of Spain. She was chosen for the attack on Vigo Bay and the harbour of Redondela on the 11th. Rear-Admiral John Graydon hoisted his flag, and she led the Blue Squadron in the attacked on the 12th. After about 90 minutes all enemy ships were either taken or destroyed. The Fleet had returned to the Downs by November 1702. She remained in Home Waters during 1703 cruising the English Channel.

== Loss ==
During the Great Storm, she was lost on the Goodwin Sands during the night of 26/27 November 1703. Captain James Greenaway perished with his ship along with her entire crew of 220 personnel. The wreck is a Protected Wreck managed by Historic England.

== Wreck ==
The remains of the Northumberland lie south of three wrecks of other ships lost in the same storm - the Stirling Castle, Restoration and Mary. The Northumberland and Mary (the latter misidentified as the Restoration) were found by recreational divers in 1980. The site was designated under the Protection of Wrecks Act 1973 the following year. The current designation is under Statutory Instrument 2004/2395, of a 300 metres (980 ft) radius around 51° 15.4802’ N 01° 30.0161’ E.

The Archaeological Diving Unit (ADU) conducted a number of dives on the site over the next three decades and since 1999 technology has been applied in the form of magnetometer and side-scan sonar surveys. The wreck was originally identified by the discovery of a bell and stock with the naval broad arrow and date; subsequently the ADU have found guns, two copper cauldrons and an anchor. The site consists of a large mound approximately 40 metres (130 ft) long by 20 metres (66 ft) wide, lying NW/SE near Fork Spit on the western edge of the Goodwin Sands. Parts are 3 metres (9.8 ft) above the surrounding seabed, but much of the structure is thought to be buried below the sand. A dense turf of juvenile mussels covers most features, making it hard to identify them. There is a coherent piece of ship's structure just south of the centre of the designated area, with large timbers and some exposed planking, possibly corresponding to the region between the first and second futtocks (ribs) of the vessel.

The wreck was investigated more intensively in 2024 when shifting sands uncovered more of the vessel. Timbers, iron cannon, copper cauldrons, a wooden gun carriage, ropes and unopened casks having been discovered, the latter rare survivors as they are vulnerable to erosion and decay. Following these findings, Historic England consider HMS Northumberland to be one of the best preserved Stuart era wrecks, but that it will now likely decay from its recent natural exposure to the sea. Its condition continues to be monitored by a Licensee on behalf of the organisation.
