= Pink (ship) =

Type of sailing ship with narrow stern

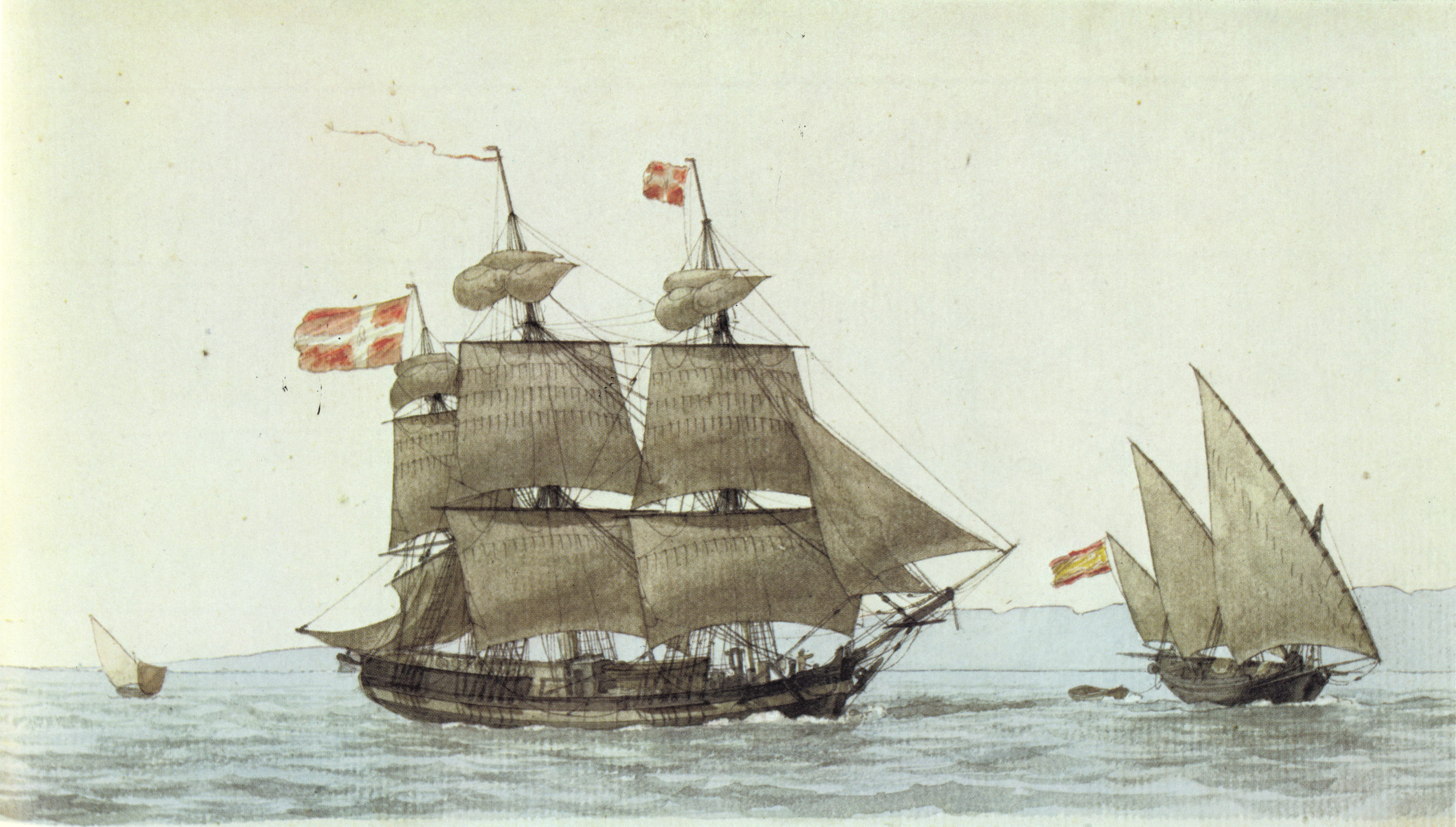
Painting of a Spanish pink (right)

A pink (French: pinque) is a sailing ship with a very narrow stern. The term was applied to two different types of ship.

The first was a small, flat-bottomed ship with a narrow stern; the name derived from the Italian word pinco. It was used primarily in the Mediterranean Sea as a cargo ship.

In the Atlantic Ocean the word pink was used to describe any small ship with a narrow stern, having derived from the Dutch word pincke meaning pinched. They had a large cargo capacity, and were generally square rigged. Their flat bottoms (and resulting shallow draught) made them more useful in shallow waters than some similar classes of ship. They were most often used for short-range missions in protected channels, as both merchantmen and warships. A number saw service in the English Navy during the second half of the 17th century. In the 1730s pinks were used in cross-Atlantic voyages to bring Palatinate immigrants to America.

This model of ship was often used in the Mediterranean because it could be sailed in shallow waters and through coral reefs. It could also be maneuvered up rivers and streams. Pinks were quite fast and flexible.

There is a reference to "pink" in its maritime sense in the State Papers of Charles II under 1 February 1672, with diarist Samuel Pepys notified about one offered for sale: "Col. Bullen Reymes to Samuel Pepes (Pepys). Offering to sell a pink now at Weymouth which can be brought round to Portsmouth and examined by Commissioner Tippetts, or by whom else they please, or to let her by the month, if they will not buy her." [S.P. Dom., Car. II. 322, No. 88.]
