= HMS Stirling Castle (1679) =

17th-century warship

Coordinates: 51°16.4561′N 01°30.4121′E

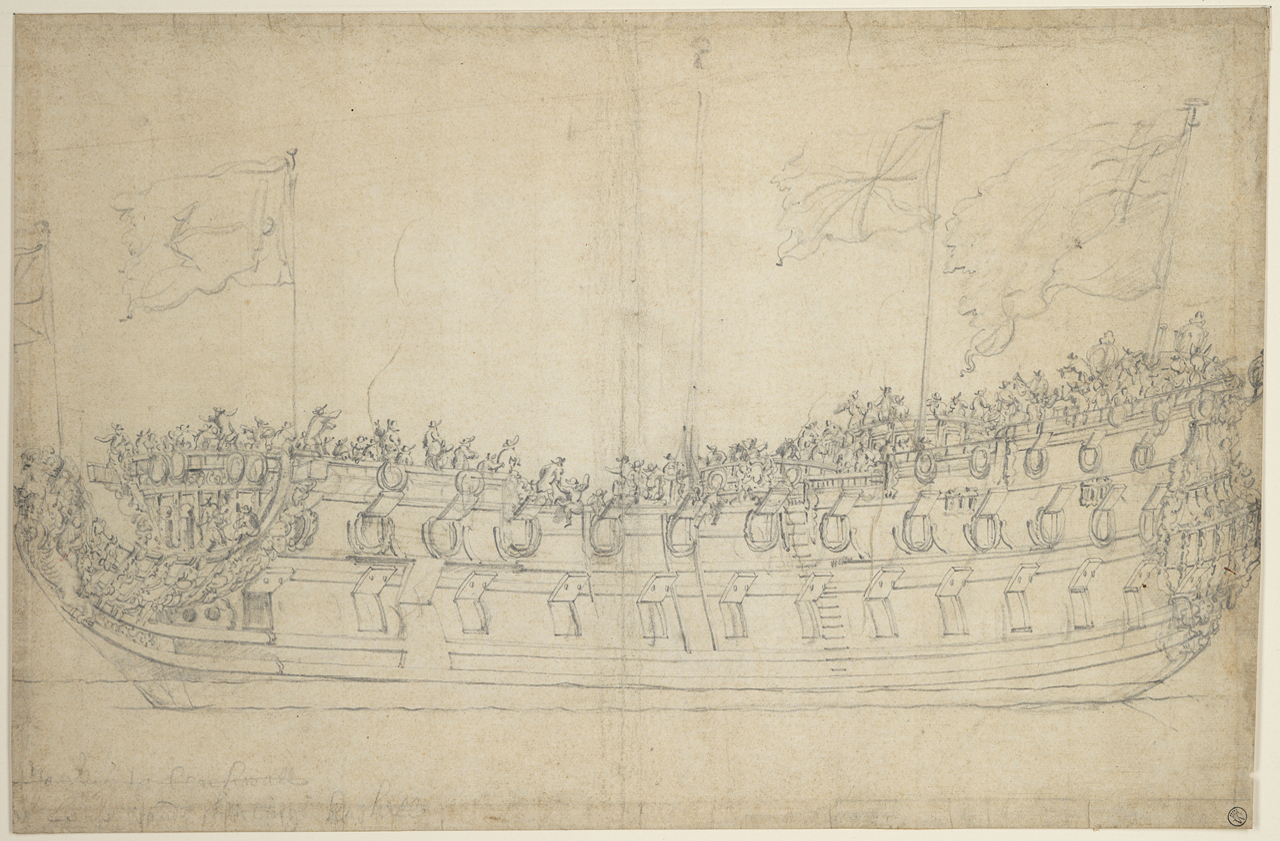
- Stirling Castle by Willem van de Velde

History

England
- Name: HMS Stirling Castle
- Ordered: 9 July 1678
- Builder: Deptford Dockyard
- Launched: 29 July 1679
- Commissioned: 1690
- Honours and awards: Barfleur 1692
- Fate: Wrecked, in Great Storm of 26/27 November 1703, on the Goodwin Sands

General characteristics as built
- Class & type: 70-gun third-rate ship of the line
- Tons burthen: 1,05929/94 tons (bm)
- Length: 151 ft 2 in (46.08 m) gundeck; 120 ft 11 in (36.86 m) keel for tonnage
- Beam: 40 ft 4 in (12.29 m)
- Depth of hold: 17 ft 3 in (5.26 m)
- Propulsion: Sails
- Sail plan: Full-rigged ship
- Armament: 1677 Establishment 72/60 guns; 26 × demi-cannons 54 cwt – 9.5 ft (LD); 26 × 12-pdr guns 32 cwt – 9 ft (UD); 10 × sakers 16 cwt – 7 ft (QD); 4 × sakers 16 cwt – 7 ft (Fc); 5 × 5 3-pdr guns 5 cwt – 5 ft (RH)

General characteristics 1699 rebuild
- Class & type: 70-gun third-rate ship of the line
- Tons burthen: 108764/94 tons (bm)
- Length: 151 ft 2 in (46.08 m) gundeck; 124 feet 8 inches (38.00 metres) keel for tonnage
- Beam: 40 ft 6 in (12.34 m)
- Depth of hold: 17 ft 8 in (5.38 m)
- Propulsion: Sails
- Sail plan: Full-rigged ship
- Armament: 1685 Establishment 70/62 guns; 26 × demi-cannons 54 cwt – 9.5 ft (LD); 26 × demi-culverins (UD); 10 × sakers 16 cwt – 7 ft (QD); 4 × sakers 16 cwt – 7 ft (Fc); 5 × 3-pdr guns 5 cwt – 5 ft (RH)

HMS Stirling Castle was a 70-gun third-rate built at Deptford Dockyard, in 1678/79. She was in active commission for the War of the English Succession, fighting in the Battles of Beachy Head and Barfleur. HMS Stirling Castle underwent a rebuild at Chatham Dockyard in 1699. She was in the Cadiz operation in 1702. The ship was wrecked on the Goodwin Sands off Deal on 27 November 1703. The remains are now a Protected Wreck managed by Historic England.

She was the first vessel to bear the name Stirling Castle in the English and Royal Navy.

HMS Stirling Castle was awarded the Battle Honour Barfleur 1692.

== Construction and specifications ==
HMS Stirling Castle was ordered on 9 July 1678 to be built at Deptford Dockyard under the guidance of Master Shipwright John Shish. Construction completed, the vessel was launched on 29 July 1679. Her dimensions were a gundeck of 151 feet 2 inches (46.08 metres) with a keel of 120 feet 11 inches (36.86 metres) for tonnage calculation with a breadth of 40 feet 9 inches (12.42 metres) and a depth of hold of 17 feet 3 inches (5.26 metres). Her builder's measure tonnage was calculated as 1,05929/94 tons (burthen). The ship's draught was 18 feet 0 inches (5.49 metres).

HMS Stirling Castle's initial gun armament was in accordance with the 1677 Establishment with 72/60 guns consisting of twenty-six demi-cannons (54 cwt, 9.5 ft) on the lower deck, twenty-six 12-pounder guns (32 cwt, 9 ft) on the upper deck, ten sakers (16 cwt, 7 ft) on the quarterdeck and four sakers (16 cwt, 7 ft) on the foc's'le with four 3-pounder guns (5 cwt, 5 ft) on the poop deck or roundhouse. By 1688, she would carry 70 guns as per the 1685 Establishment. Her initial manning establishment would be for a crew of 460/380/300 personnel.

== Commissioned service ==
=== Service 1679-1699 ===
She was commissioned in 1690 under Captain Anthony Hastings. She fought in the Battle of Beachy Head in Centre (Red) Squadron on 30 June 1690. In 1691 Captain Benjamin Walters was in command. She was in the Battle of Barfleur as a member of Rear (Blue) Squadron, Rear Division between 19 and 22 May 1692. She also partook in the Battles off Cherbourg and La Hogue on 23 and 24 May 1692. Captain Humphrey Sanders was in command in 1693 with the Channel Fleet. In 1695 she was under Captain Robert Deane sailing with Lord Berkeley's operations. In 1696 she was sailing in the Soundings. In 1697 she was under the command of Captain Jedediah Barker operating with the Dunkirk Squadron. She would be rebuilt at Chatham in 1699.

=== Rebuilt at Chatham Dockyard 1699 ===
She was ordered rebuilt at Chatham Dockyard under the guidance of Master Shipwright Daniel Furzer. She was launched/completed in 1699. Her dimensions were a gundeck of 151 feet 2 inches (46.08 metres) with a keel of 124 feet 8 inches (38.00 metres) for tonnage calculation with a breadth of 40 feet 6 inches (12.34 metres) and a depth of hold of 17 feet 8 inches (5.38 metres). Her builder's measure tonnage was calculated as 1,08764/94 tons (burthen). She probably retained her armament as stated in the 1685 Establishment, though it is unclear if her armament was changed to the 1703 Establishment later. It is known that when completed her gun armament total at least 70 guns.

=== Service 1701-1703 ===
HMS Stirling Castle was commissioned in 1701 under the command of Captain John Johnson for service in Sir George Rooke's Fleet for operations at Cadiz, Spain. They sailed from Spithead to St Helens (in the Scilly Islands) on 19 July 1702. The arrived at the Bay of Bulls (six miles north of Cadiz) on 12 August. After many conferences and negotiations, the stores that had been seized were destroyed and the troops were re-embarked on 15 September. On 19 September it was decided to return to England. On 21 September it was learned that a French Fleet and Spanish treasure ships were in the vicinity of Vigo Bay. On the 11th a council of war was held to determine the ships that would initially enter the bay. Stirling Castle was not chosen and remained off the entrance of the Bay of Vigo. She was the Flagship of Sir John Leake in December 1702. Captain Josiah Crow took temporary command in July 1703. By November Captain Johnson was back in command.

== Loss ==
During the Great Storm of 26/27 November 1703, she was lost on the Goodwin Sands. Captain John Johnson perished with his ship. There were 70 survivors from her 349 crew.

It is most likely that Stirling Castle was moored with two anchors, her best bower and small bower, each on a single cable. Some reports suggest that HMS Northumberland dragged her own anchor across those of Stirling Castle. Whatever the circumstances, Stirling Castle's anchors did not hold and she was blown towards the Goodwin Sands, grounding at high tide. In the time available, the crew, working in a wind so strong that a man could not stand in it, managed to get the spare anchor deployed. Though it did not stop the ship dragging, it held her bow into the storm. There was no time to get the heavier sheet anchor over the side before she struck. The spare anchor has been discovered during the archaeological investigation of the wreck. Its position suggests that it prevented the ship from turning broadside to the waves and being rapidly destroyed by breaking waves, as happened to others lost on the sands in the same storm. Instead, survivors found some safety in the stern as the ship settled into the sands. They had to endure two nights on the wreck before rescuers from Deal were able to get out to them, launching their boats from the exposed beach and crossing five miles of rough seas.

== Wreck ==
Local recreational divers found the wreck in 1979 following a movement of the surrounding sand. The wreck lies in 12.1 metres (40 ft) of water near the North Sand Head, Goodwin Knoll. The ship was in a remarkable state of preservation, possibly uncovered for the first time since she sank, and numerous artefacts were recovered in 1979–80. Most are held by Ramsgate Maritime Museum but some were first displayed at Bleak House in Broadstairs while it was still a museum, and then moved to the Deal Maritime Museum. A few artefacts have been recovered since, but the wreck was already being covered by fresh sediment in 1981.

The ship re-emerged from the sand in 1998. Scouring of the sand supporting the stern and port quarter led to their partial collapse in the winter of 1999–2000, and the structure has been further destabilised since then. In 2000 a team of divers successfully recovered a Demi-cannon, complete with its original gun carriage from the site. This "Rupertino" gun designed by the king's nephew Prince Rupert, was one of eight delivered by the gun maker Thomas Westerne in 1690. The 49 long cwt (2,489 kg) gun fired 32 lb (14.5 kg) shot.

In 2002 a wooden fixed block was recovered that may provide evidence on the introduction of the ship's steering wheel, possibly during the refit of 1701. Other evidence is the presence of large blocks at the ship's side in the gunroom, which would be part of the same routing of steering ropes to the tiller. Richard Endsor has argued that the ship had both a steering wheel and the older whipstaff, thus Stirling Castle provides important evidence for the transition between these two mechanisms. It suggests that the whipstaff was still seen as a useful steering device which continued to be used under certain circumstances even when a wheel was also fitted.

HMS Stirling Castle was designated under the Protection of Wrecks Act on 6 June 1980 by Statutory Instrument 1980/645. The position was updated by SI 1980/1306 the same year. SI 2004/2395 in 2004 redesignated the protected area from a radius of 50 m to 300 around 51° 16.4561' N, 01° 30.4121' E. The wreck has the National Monuments Record number of TR45NW24. In 1980 the wreck was bought from the Ministry of Defence by the Isle of Thanet Archaeological Unit (now the Isle of Thanet Archaeological Society), and in 1982 the Society sold 64 shares in the Stirling Castle to raise funds.

The archive of the Stirling Castle is dispersed over several repositories and is in various stages of preservation. In 2016 Historic England published a report on the conservation work carried out on some of the surface recovered material from the wreck site.

== In popular culture ==
Daniel Defoe alleged that hundreds of sailors escaped onto sandbanks exposed at low tide, but the people of Deal were so busy salvaging goods after the storm that they left the survivors to drown. This unfounded allegation incensed the citizens of Deal, whose Mayor had organised volunteers to go out to save men from the wreck, so they brought a libel action against Defoe. The Mayor had found himself liable for the maintenance of the survivors of the storm and their coach fares to London (for which he was eventually repaid by the Crown), as well as the burial expenses of those whose bodies were recovered.

She was featured on the Channel 4 documentary series Wreck Detectives in 2003.

== See also ==
- HMS Northumberland (1679) – sank just south of the Stirling Castle in the same storm, along with :
- HMS Restoration
- HMS Mary
