= HMS Resolution (1667) =

Ship of the line of the Royal Navy

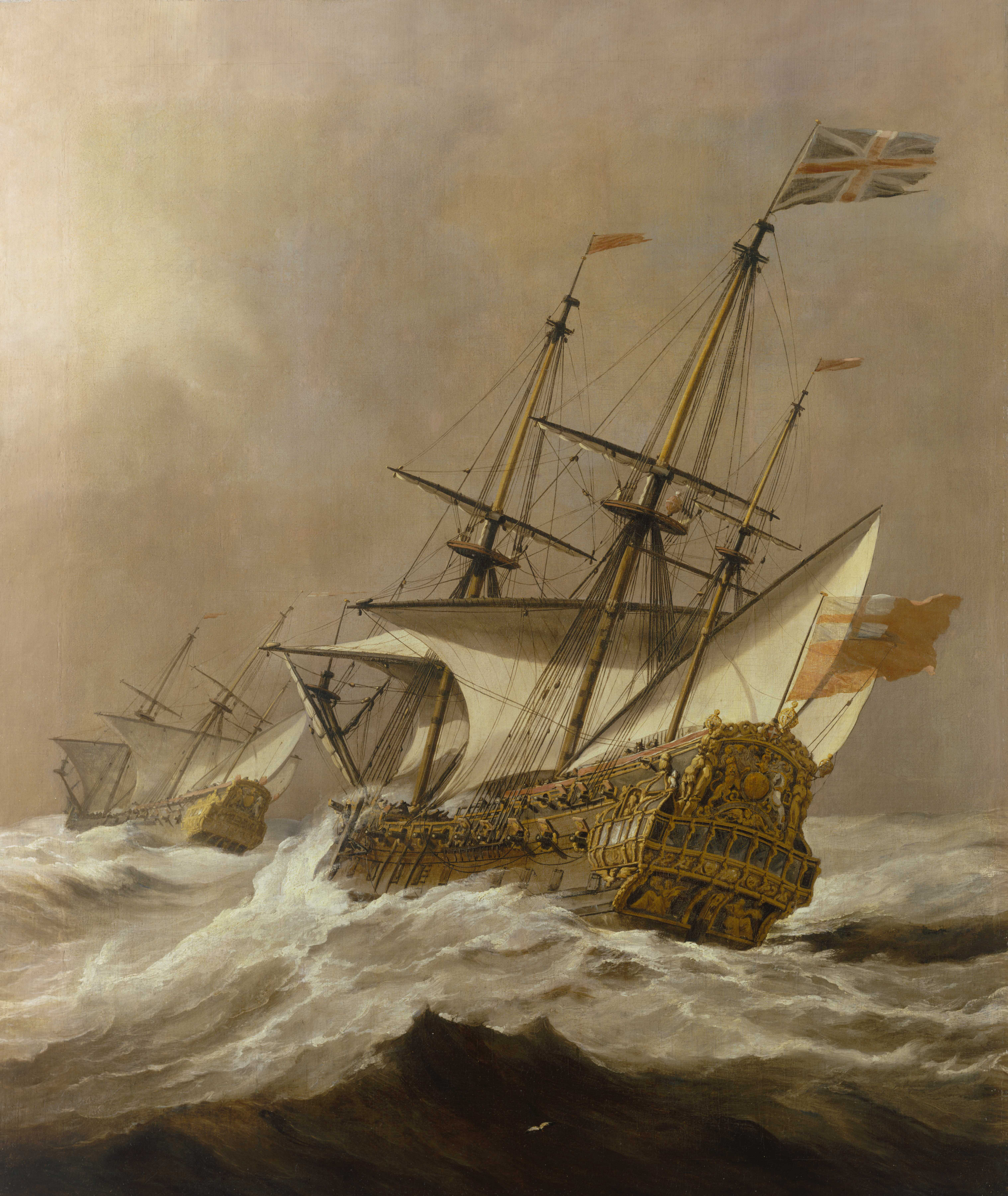
- HMS Resolution in a gale by Willem van de Velde, the younger depicts HMS Resolution c. 1678.

History

England
- Name: HMS Resolution
- Builder: Deane, Harwich Dockyard
- Laid down: 1665
- Launched: 1667
- Fate: Wrecked in the Great Storm of 1703

General characteristics as built
- Class & type: 70-gun third-rate ship of the line
- Tons burthen: 902 (bm)
- Length: 148 ft 2 in (45.16 m) (gundeck); 120 ft 6 in (36.73 m) (keel)
- Beam: 37 ft 2 in (11.33 m); after girdling 37 ft 6 in (11.43 m)
- Depth of hold: 15 ft 9 in (4.80 m)
- Propulsion: Sails
- Sail plan: Full-rigged ship
- Armament: 70 guns of various weights of shot (68 guns by 1685)

General characteristics after 1698 rebuild
- Class & type: 70-gun third-rate ship of the line
- Tons burthen: 88537/94 bm
- Length: 148 ft 2 in (45.16 m) (gundeck)
- Beam: 37 ft 6 in (11.43 m)
- Depth of hold: 15 ft 9 in (4.80 m)
- Propulsion: Sail
- Sail plan: Full-rigged ship
- Armament: 70 guns of various weights of shot

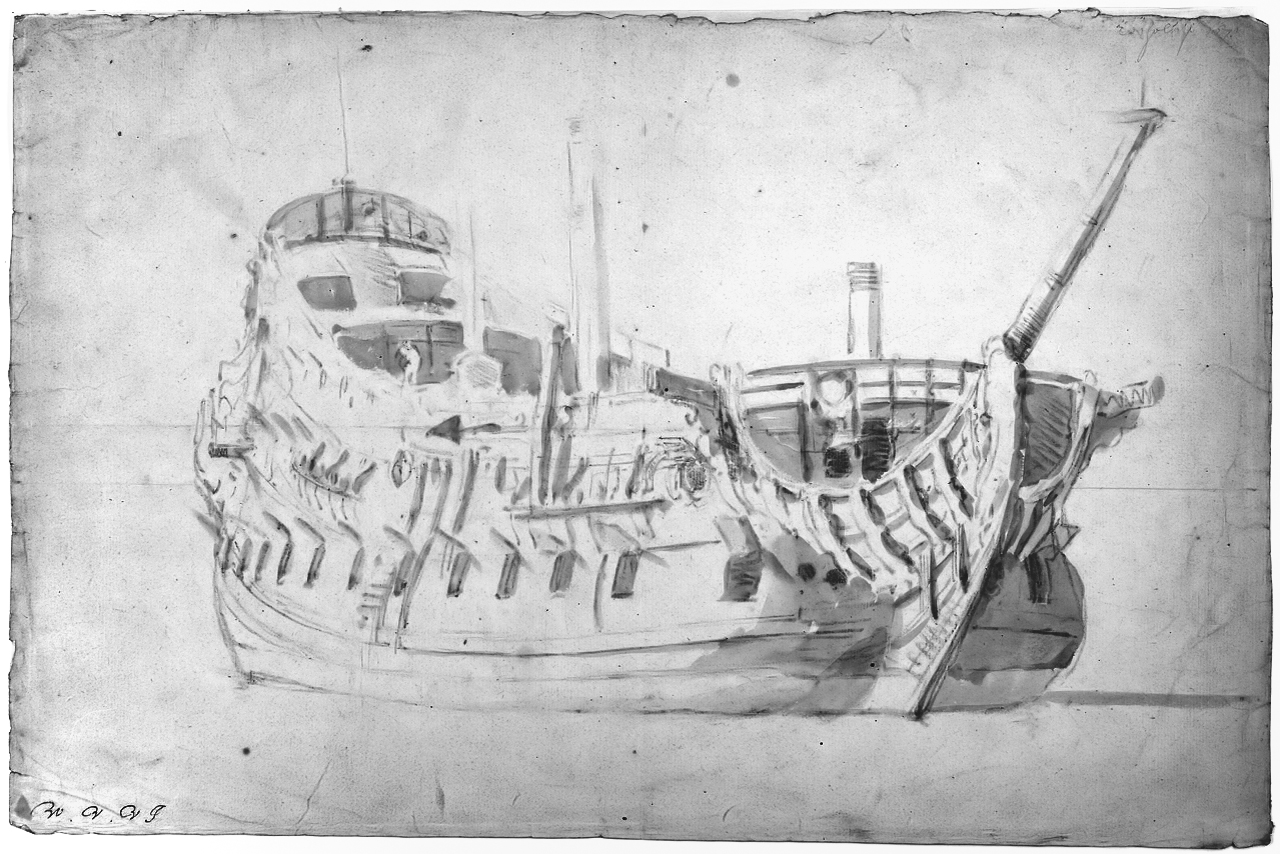
The Resolution, third-rate built in 1667 (Willem van de Velde, 1676)

HMS Resolution was a 70-gun third-rate ship of the line of the Royal Navy, launched at Harwich Dockyard on 6 December 1667. She was one of only three third-rate vessels designed and built by the noted maritime architect Sir Anthony Deane.

== History ==
Resolution served as the flagship in an expedition against the Barbary Corsairs in 1669 and took part in the unsuccessful attack on the Dutch Smyrna convoy, which resulted in the Third Anglo-Dutch War. She was later girdled, which increased her breadth slightly, and underwent a rebuilding in 1698 – although this limited reconstruction did not involve taking her hull to pieces. She was lost in 1703.

By 1685, Resolution was only armed with 68 guns. She was relaunched after a rebuild at Chatham Dockyard on 30 April 1698, as a 70-gun ship once more.

=== Sinking ===
In the Great Storm of 1703 in Pevensey Bay, East Sussex, she hit the Owers Bank off Littlehampton before the crew could even get up sail, then blown across the Solent, limping on around Beachy Head. With the ship seriously flooded, her captain, Thomas Liell, tried unsuccessfully to beach her in Pevensey Bay, but the crew had to abandon ship, and all made it ashore.

=== Wreck ===
In April 2005, a well-preserved wreck believed to be hers was discovered by 3 divers attempting to recover a tangled-up lobster pot 1 1/2 miles offshore and 9 metres below sea level, at approximately 50°48′10″N 0°24′38″E. It was only when a 12 ft anchor appeared that Paul Stratford, Martin Wiltshire, and Steve Paice then found dozens of cast-iron cannon around a timber hull. The discovery was kept secret whilst a preliminary survey by Wessex Archaeology was carried out at the site and whilst discussions were carried out as to how best to protect it. This found at least 45 large cannon, along with a ballast mound surrounded by wooden ribs and planking protruding from a seabed of sand and silt. These all seemed to be from a large warship dating between 1600 and 1800 which is 'likely' to be Resolution.

The site was then in May 2006 made public and given official protection under the Protection of Wrecks Act 1973, banning unauthorised diving within 100 m, by culture Minister David Lammy Martin Wiltshire and Steve Paice allowed Paul Stratford take on the responsibilities of licensee applicant. The wreck is a Protected Wreck managed by Historic England. "Details from listed building database (1000084)". National Heritage List for England.

Ian Oxley, head of maritime archaeology at English Heritage, called the ship 'a crucial part of England's seafaring heritage'. One of the divers, Mr Paul Stratford, 41, who had only been diving for four years, said they were 'very proud' of their find and added:

'It was unbelievable. We went down there expecting to get some fishing junk and found a huge anchor. Visibility was poor but we kept finding cannon after cannon. We have been fishing and then diving in this area since we were kids, so were astonished to find this in our bay. It feeds your imagination about what else might be down there.

'Many people dive for years hoping to find something like this, but we really stumbled upon it. We've been diving for four or five years and fished here as well, and to find this on our own doorstep is unbelievable. There is the anchor, some cannon, a large area of brickwork which is believed to be the galley area, but the site hasn't been dug up or disturbed at the moment. We've only been recording what's down there. We've been working closely with English Heritage and the Nautical Archaeology Society in Portsmouth.

'It was obvious once we came across it that it was a big war ship. It had to be because of the number of guns there. The lack of any steel made us realise that we were dealing with a timber ship and very soon afterwards we found the hull structure. We believe it is the HMS Resolution. We can't be certain until we can find something so that we can date it. But with all the information pulled in for us, it looks most likely that it is the Resolution.'

If the wreck does prove to be HMS Resolution, it is already owned by the Nautical Museums Trust in Hastings, which bought rights to the yet-to-be-found vessel from the MoD in 1985. Their representative, Adrian Barak, said,

'This is a hugely significant find. We can't say it is definitely Resolution but it is almost the exact right place. It is remarkable that this wreck hadn't been discovered before. It may be that the seabed was moved by winter storms which uncovered it.'

For now the 3 divers (who are in 2006 taking NAS Training courses up to Part III, which will equip them to carry out sophisticated survey work) have been appointed as the site's joint licensees and will oversee maintenance, survey and any excavation, in partnership with Wessex Archaeology and with involvement from the Nautical Archaeology Society. In relation to this the divers have said:

'We are meeting soon with them, Wessex and English Heritage to discuss the way forward. For one thing, we are in need of project funding to support survey and possible sampling work that might lead to a positive identification.'

A physical and virtual dive trail has been developed for the site.

== See also ==
- Wreck diving
- Maritime archaeology
- Underwater archaeology
- Nautical Archaeology Society
- Archaeology of shipwrecks
- List of designations under the Protection of Wrecks Act
- Protection of Wrecks Act
