= Swallow (disambiguation) =

Swallow is a family of birds.

Swallow or Swallows may also refer to:

- Swallowing, transferring a substance from the mouth to the stomach

== Music ==
- Swallow (British band), a 1990s duo
- Swallow (American band), a 1970s blues rock band or their 1973 album
- The Swallows, a 1950s R&B group
- La rondine or The Swallow, an opera by Giacomo Puccini
- Swallow Records, a record label formed by Floyd Soileau

=== Albums ===
- Swallow!, a 2026 album by Shygirl
- Swallow (Steve Swallow album)
- Swallow (Zhao Wei album)

=== Songs ===
- "Swallow" (song), a song by Sleeper
- "The Swallow" (Yoasobi song), a song by Yoasobi
- "Swallow", a song by Emilie Autumn from Opheliac
- "Swallow", a song by Crystal Fighters from Follow / Swallow
- "Swallow", a song by Korn from Life Is Peachy
- "Swallow", a song by My Bloody Valentine from Tremolo

== Sports ==
- Dingli Swallows F.C., a Maltese football club
- Mbabane Swallows, a Swazi football club
- Moroka Swallows FC, a South African football club
- Tokyo Yakult Swallows, a Japanese baseball team
- Estonia men's national ice hockey team or the Swallows

== Transport ==
- Swallow Sidecar Company
- Swallow, a GWR Iron Duke Class locomotive
- Swallow, a GWR 3031 Class Great Western Railway locomotive
- Swallow, an RB545 rocket engine

=== Aeronautics ===
- British Aircraft Swallow, a 1930s light aircraft
- De Havilland DH 108 Swallow, an experimental British aircraft designed in 1945
- Fly Air Swallow, a Bulgarian ultralight trike design
- Messerschmitt Me 262 Schwalbe or Swallow, a World War II German fighter aircraft
- Republic SD-4 Swallow, a 1960 American drone project
- Swallow Airplane Company, an American aviation company in operation 1923-1956
- Swallow, an experimental jet aircraft design by Barnes Wallis

=== Ships ===
- HMS Swallow, several ships of the Royal Navy
- HM Revenue Cutter Swallow, several ships
- USS Swallow, several ships of the United States Navy
- Swallow (ship), several ships
- Swallow (keelboat), a class of sailboats, used at the 1948 Olympics

== Other uses ==
- Swallow (surname)
- Swallow (2019 film), American–French drama
- Swallow (2021 film), Nigerian film
- Swallow (hieroglyph)
- Swallow (novel), 1899, by H. Rider Haggard
- Swallow, Lincolnshire, England
- Swallows, Colorado, a ghost town in the United States
- Swallow Hotels
- Swallow (food), dough-like African staple food made of cooked starchy vegetables and/or grains

== See also ==
- De Zwaluw (disambiguation)
- Swallow Falls
- Swallow Reef
- Swallow tattoo
