= Swallow (ship) =

Several ships have been named Swallow for the bird Swallow:

- Swallow, a ship of the Third Supply fleet to Virginia colony in 1609.
- Swallow, a ship said to have been sailed by Peter Wallace to Belize in 1638.
- Swallow (1751 Brigantine)
- Swallow (1779 EIC packet) was a packet ship that the British East India Company (EIC) launched at Bombay in 1779. She made nine trips between India and Britain for the EIC between 1782 and 1803. Her most notable exploit occurred on her seventh voyage, when she helped capture seven Dutch East Indiamen on 15 June 1795. The Royal Navy purchased her in 1804 and named her Lilly. She served in the navy until she was sold in 1811. Her whereabouts between 1811 and 1815 are obscure, but in 1815 J. Lyney, of London, purchased her and she sailed to the West Indies and to India as an EIC-licensed vessel until she wrecked on her way to Calcutta in 1823.
- Swallow was purchased by the British Royal Navy on the stocks. The Navy sold her in 1795. She became a West Indiaman and a hired armed vessel for the British government. She captured some prizes and was last listed in 1799.
- Swallow was an 18-gun Albatross-class brig–sloop of the British Royal Navy, launched in 1795 and sold in 1802. During her naval career she captured a number of French privateers while on the Jamaica station. After her sale she became an armed whaler sailing under a letter of marque. As a privateer she captured two French whaling vessels but then is no longer listed after 1810.
- Swallow (1797 ship) was launched in France in 1793. After her capture c.1797, she became a slave ship, sailing from London. She landed her slaves in 1798 at Grenada and then disappears from currently available records.
- Swallow (1798 ship)'s origins are obscure in terms of her launch year and place. In 1798 she sailed from Liverpool to gather slaves. After gathering her slaves, Swallow sailed towards the West Indies. On her way she captured a French privateer. However, the privateer's crew were able seize their captors. They then sailed Swallow and their privateer into Cayenne.
- Swallow (1805 ship) was launched in Spain in 1790. She made two voyages (1805 and 1806) as a slave ship, being captured on both.
- Swallow (1813 ship) was launched at Calcutta. She sailed to England and then traded between England and India under a license from the British East India Company (EIC) between 1813 and 1824. She returned to Calcutta registry and at some point after 1829 was sold in Java.
- Swallow (1820 ship) was launched in New Brunswick. She transferred her registry to Great Britain in 1825. She was wrecked in the Azores in 1829.

== See also ==
- Swallow (Royal Navy tender), several vessels
- HMS Swallow, several vessels of the British Royal Navy
- HM Revenue Cutter Swallow, several vessels
- USS Swallow, several vessels of the United States Navy
