= History of Saint Helena =

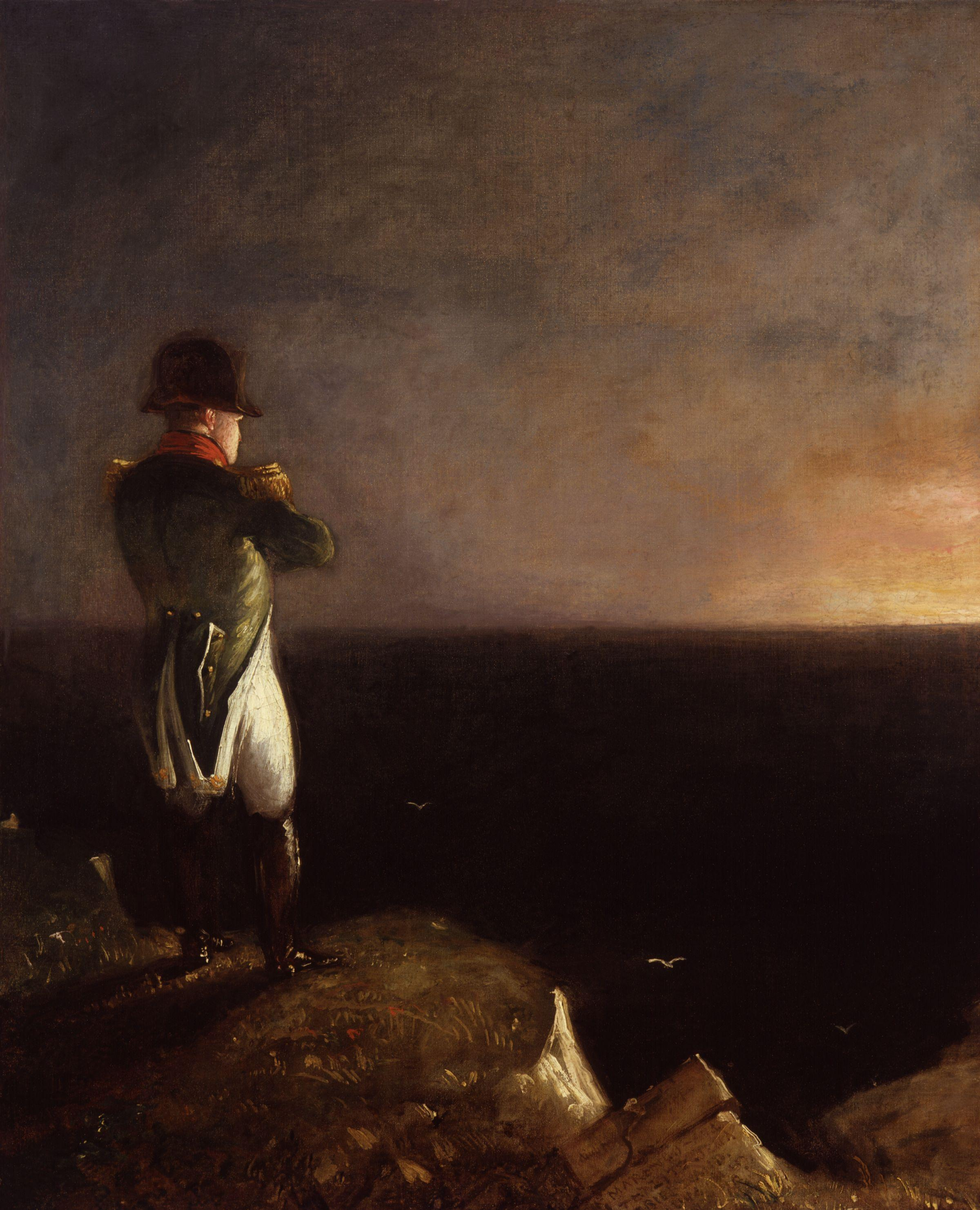
Painting of Napoleon in exile on Saint Helena

Saint Helena has a known history of over 500 years since its recorded discovery by the Portuguese in 1502. Claiming to be Britain's second oldest colony, after Bermuda, this is one of the most remote settlements in the world and was for several centuries of vital strategic importance to ships sailing to Europe from Asia and South Africa. Since the early 19th century, the British occasionally used the island as a place of exile, most notably for Napoleon Bonaparte, Dinuzulu kaCetshwayo and over 5,000 Boer prisoners.

== Discovery and early years, 1502–1658 ==
By long tradition the island was sighted on 21 May 1502 by the four ships of the 3rd Portuguese Armada commanded by Galician navigator João da Nova during the return voyage to Lisbon, and that he named it Santa Helena after Saint Helena of Constantinople. This tradition has been reviewed by a 2022 paper which concluded the Portuguese chronicles published at least 50 years later, are the sole primary source to the discovery. Although contradictory in describing other events, these chronicles almost unanimously claim João da Nova found St Helena sometime in 1502, although none quote the precise date.

However, there are several reasons for doubting da Nova made this discovery. First, given that da Nova either returned on 11 September or 13 September 1502 it is usually assumed the Cantino planisphere completed by the following November includes his discovery of Ascension Island (shown as an archipelago with one of six islands marked as "ilha achada e chamada Ascenssam"), yet this map fails to show St Helena. Second, when a section of the Fourth Armada under the command of Estêvão da Gama sighted and landed at St Helena the following year on 30 July 1503 its scrivener Thomé Lopes regarded it as an unknown island yet named Ascension as one of five reference points to the new island's location. On 12 July 1502, nearly three weeks before reaching St Helena, Lopes described how Estêvão da Gama's ships met up with a section of the Fifth Armada led by Afonso de Albuquerque off the Cape of Good Hope. The latter left Lisbon about six months after João da Nova's return so Albuquerque and his captains should all have known whether João da Nova had indeed found St Helena. An anonymous Flemish traveler on one of da Gama's ships reporting that bread and victuals were running short by the time they reached the Cape, so from da Gama's perspective there was a pressing need that he be told water and meat could be found at St Helena. The fact that nothing seems to have been said about the island, da Gama's scrivener Lopes regarding the island as unknown, again implies da Nova found Ascension but not St Helena. The 2022 paper also reviews cartographic evidence that St Helena and Ascension were known to the Spanish in 1500, before either João da Nova or Estêvão da Gama sailed for India. The suggestion that João da Nova discovered Tristan da Cunha naming it St Helena is discounted.

If João da Nova indeed found St Helena, a separate 2015 paper has reviewed another tradition that he did so on 21 May 1502. This date appears to have first been suggested by Jan Huyghen van Linschoten in a book published in Holland in 1596. This described how his ships left St Helena on 21 May 1589, this being both the feast of Saint Helena and Whitsunday. At first sight, this statement seems to be a contradiction - the Roman Catholic Church certainly celebrated Whitsunday that day but their feast-day of Saint Helena was on 18 August. Linschoten's statement did not fit in with the Eastern Orthodox Church either - this faith certainly marked Saint Helena on 21 May but in 1589 celebrated Whitsun a week later, on 28 May. The paper suggested the solution to this apparent paradox was the fact that by the time his book was published in 1596 Linschoten had converted to the Protestant Dutch Reformed Church. This faith celebrated Whitsunday on the same day as Catholics while Saint Helena was marked on 21 May, the same day as the Orthodox Church. Quite apart from the fact that the discoverers were Catholics, Linschoten failed to realise the impossibility that the island was named after a Protestant feast-day, it being found more than a decade before the Reformation and start of Protestantism. An alternative discovery date of 3 May on the Catholic feast-day celebrating the finding of the True Cross by Saint Helena in Jerusalem, as quoted by Odoardo Duarte Lopes in 1591 and by Sir Thomas Herbert in 1638, is suggested as historically more credible than the Protestant date of 21 May. The paper observes that if da Nova made the discovery on 3 May 1502, he may have been inhibited from naming the island Ilha de Vera Cruz (Island of the True Cross) because Pedro Álvares Cabral had already assigned that same name to the Brazilian coastline, which he thought to be a large island, on 3 May 1500. News of Cabral's discovery reached Lisbon directly from South America before da Nova's fleet set off on the voyage to India in 1501. If da Nova knew the True Cross name had already been assigned, the most obvious and plausible alternative name for him to give the island was "Santa Helena".

The long tradition that João da Nova built a chapel from one of his wrecked carracks has been shown to be based on a misreading of the records.

The Portuguese found it uninhabited, with an abundance of trees and fresh water. They imported livestock (mainly goats), fruit trees, and vegetables, built a chapel and one or two houses, and left their sick, suffering from scurvy and other ailments, to be taken home, if they recovered, by the next ship, but they formed no permanent settlement. The island thereby became crucially important for the collection of food and as a rendezvous point for homebound voyages from Asia. The island was directly in line with the Trade Winds which took ships rounding the Cape of Good Hope into the South Atlantic. St Helena was much less frequently visited by Asia-bound ships, the northern trade winds taking ships towards the South American continent rather than the island. An analysis has been published of the Portuguese ships arriving at St Helena in the period 1502–1613.

It is a popular belief that the Portuguese managed to keep the location of this remote island a secret until almost the end of the 16th century. However, both the location of the island and its name were quoted in a Dutch book in 1508, which described a 1505 Portuguese expedition led by Francisco de Almeida from the East Indies: "[o]n the twenty-first day of July we saw land, and it was an island lyng six hundred and fifty miles from the Cape, and called Saint Helena, howbeit we could not land there. [...] And after we left the island of Saint Helena, we saw another island two hundred miles from there, which is called Ascension". Additional references to Saint Helena as a rendezvous point were publicly documented in the early 16th century, such as the account of Dürer's Rhinoceros's voyage to Portugal in 1515.

Also, Lopo Homem-Reineis published the Atlas Universal about 1519 which clearly showed the locations of St Helena and Ascension. The first residents all arrived on Portuguese vessels. Its first known permanent resident was Portuguese, Fernão Lopes (also Fernando Lopes) who had turned traitor in India and had been mutilated by order of Alphonso d'Albuquerque, the Governor of Goa. Fernão Lopes preferred being marooned to returning to Portugal in his maimed condition, and lived on Saint Helena from about 1516. By royal command, Lopes returned to Portugal about 1526 and then travelled to Rome, where Pope Clement VII granted him an audience. Lopes returned to Saint Helena, where he died in 1545.

When the island was discovered, it was covered with unique indigenous vegetation. Claims that on discovery the island "was entirely covered with forests, the trees drooping over the tremendous precipices that overhang the sea" have been questioned. It is argued that the presence of an endemic plover and several endemic insects adapted to the barren and arid coastal portions of the island are strong indications that these conditions existed before the island was discovered. Also, the earliest description of the island by Thome Lopez, who sighted the island on 3 July 1503, specifically states that coastal trees were absent: ". . . nor did we see any kind of trees, but it was completely green . . ." Rather than trees, this eyewitness account suggests the presence of low-height scrub adapted to the coastal desert conditions. Nevertheless, St Helena certainly once had a rich and dense inland forest. The loss of endemic vegetation, birds and other fauna, much of it within the first 50 years of discovery, can be attributed to the impact of humans and their introduction of goats, pigs, dogs, cats, rats as well as the introduction of non-endemic birds and vegetation into the island.

Sometime before 1557 five people (two male slaves from Mozambique, one from Java and two women) escaped from a ship and remained hidden on the island for many years, long enough for their numbers to rise to twenty. Bermudez, the Patriarch of Abyssinia landed at St Helena in 1557 on a voyage to Portugal, remaining on the island for a year. Three Japanese ambassadors on an embassy to the Pope also visited St Helena in 1583.

Strong circumstantial evidence supports the idea that Sir Francis Drake located the island on the final lap of his circumnavigation of the world (1577–1580). It is suspected this explains how the location of the island was certainly known to the English only a few years later, for example, William Barrett (who died in 1584 as English consul at Aleppo, Syria) stated the island was "sixteen degrees to the South", which is precisely the correct latitude. Again, it is also clear that the Elizabethan adventurer Edward Fenton at the very least knew the approximate location of the island in 1582.

It therefore seems unlikely that when Thomas Cavendish arrived in 1588 during his first attempt to circumnavigate the world, he was the first Englishman to land at the island. He stayed for 12 days and described the valley (initially called Chapel Valley) where Jamestown is situated as "a marvellous fair and pleasant valley, wherein divers handsome buildings and houses were set up, and especially one which was a church, which was tiled, and whitened on the outside very fair, and made with a porch, and within the church at the upper end was set an alter.... This valley is the fairest and largest low plot in all the island, and it is marvellous sweet and pleasant, and planted in every place with fruit trees or with herbs.... There are on this island thousands of goats, which the Spaniards call cabritos, which are very wild: you shall sometimes see one or two hundred of them together, and sometimes you may behold them going in a flock almost a mile long."

Another English seaman, Captain Abraham Kendall, visited Saint Helena in 1591, and in 1593 Sir James Lancaster stopped at the island on his way home from the East. Once St Helena's location was more widely known, English ships of war began to lie in wait in the area to attack Portuguese India carracks on their way home. As a result, in 1592 Philip II of Spain and I of Portugal (1581–1598) ordered the annual fleet returning from Goa on no account to touch at St Helena. In developing their Far East trade, the Dutch also began to frequent the island. One of their first visits was in 1598 when an expedition of two vessels piloted by John Davis (English explorer) attacked a large Spanish Caravel, only to be beaten off and forced to retreat to Ascension Island for repairs. The Italian merchant Francesco Carletti claimed in his autobiography he was robbed by the Dutch when sailing on a Portuguese ship in 1602.

The Portuguese and Spanish soon gave up regularly calling at the island, partly because they used ports along the West African coast, but also because of attacks on their shipping, desecration to their chapel and images, destruction of their livestock and destruction of plantations by Dutch and English sailors. In 1603 Lancaster again visited Saint Helena on his return from the first voyage equipped by the British East India Company. In 1610, by which time most Dutch and English ships visited the island on their home voyage, François Pyrard de Laval deplored the deterioration since his last visit in 1601, describing damage to the chapel and destruction of fruit trees by cutting down trees to pick the fruit. While Thomas Best, commander of the tenth British East India Company expedition reported plentiful supplies of lemons in 1614, only 40 lemon trees were observed by the traveller Peter Mundy in 1634.

The Dutch Republic formally made claim to St Helena in 1633, although there is no evidence that they ever occupied, colonised or fortified it. A Dutch territorial stone, undated but certainly later than 1633, is presently kept in the island's archive office. By 1651, the Dutch had mainly abandoned the island in favour of their colony founded at the Cape of Good Hope.

== East India Company, 1658–1815 ==
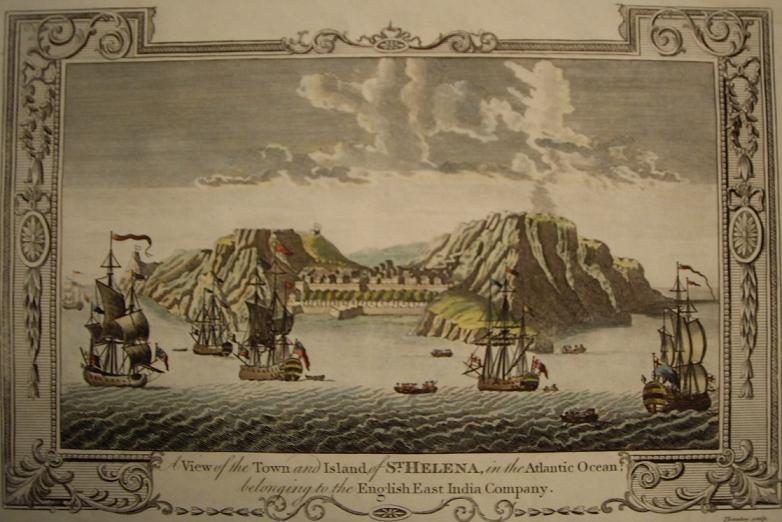
A View of the Town and Island of St Helena in the Atlantic Ocean belonging to the English East India Company, engraving c. 1790.

The idea for the English to make claim to the island was first made in a 1644 pamphlet by Richard Boothby. By 1649, the East India Company (EIC) ordered all homeward-bound vessels to wait for one another at St Helena and in 1656 onward the Company petitioned the government to send a man-of-war to convoy the fleet home from there. Having been granted a charter to govern the island by the Lord Protector of the Commonwealth Oliver Cromwell in 1657, the following year the Company decided to fortify and colonise St Helena with planters. A fleet commanded by Captain John Dutton (first governor, 1659–1661) in the Marmaduke arrived at St Helena in 1659. It is from this date that St Helena claims to be Britain's second oldest colony (after Bermuda). A fort, originally named the Castle of St John, was completed within a month and further houses were built further up the valley. It soon became obvious that the island could not be made self-sufficient and in early 1658, the East India Company ordered all homecoming ships to provide one ton of rice on their arrival at the island.

With the restoration of the monarchy in 1660, the fort was renamed James Fort, the town Jamestown and the valley James Valley, all in honour of the Duke of York, later James II of England. The East India Company immediately sought a Royal Charter, possibly to give their occupation of St Helena legitimacy. This was issued in 1661 and gave the company the sole right to fortify and colonise the island "in such legal and reasonable manner the said Governor and Company should see fit". Each planter was allocated one of 130 pieces of land, but the company had great difficulty attracting new immigrants, the population falling to only 66, including 18 slaves, by 1670. The long tradition that the early settlers included many who had lost their home in the 1666 Great Fire of London has been shown to be a myth. John Dutton's successors as governor, Robert Stringer (1661–1670) and Richard Coney (1671–1672), repeatedly warned the Company of unrest amongst the inhabitants, Coney complaining the inhabitants were drunks and ne'er-do-wells. In 1672 Coney was seized by rebellious members of the island's council and shipped back to England. Coincidentally, the company had already sent a replacement governor, Anthony Beale (1672–1673).

During the Third Anglo-Dutch War (1672–1674), the Dutch East India Company, having found that the Cape was not the ideal harbour it had originally envisaged, launched an armed invasion of St Helena from the Cape colony at the turn of 1672–1673. Governor Beale was forced to abandon the island in a Company ship, sailing to Brazil where he hired a fast ship. This he used to locate an East India Company flotilla sent to reinforce St Helena with fresh troops. The Company retook the island in May 1673 without loss of life and reinforced it with 250 troops. None of the island's own records survive from before the Dutch invasion. The earliest surviving St Helena records date from 1673. The same year the Company petitioned a new Charter from Charles II of England and this granted the island free title as though it was a part of England "in the same manner as East Greenwich in the County of Kent". Acknowledging that St Helena was a place where there was no trade, the company was permitted to send from England any provisions free of Customs and to convey as many settlers as required.

In 1674 discontented settlers and troops seized Richard Keigwin (1673–1674), the next acting governor; it was only the lucky arrival of an East India Company fleet under the command of Captain William Basse that freed Keigwin. By 1675, the part-time recruitment of settlers in a Militia enabled the permanent garrison to be reduced to 50 troops. On leaving the University of Oxford, in 1676, Edmond Halley visited Saint Helena and set up an observatory with a 24-foot-long (7.3 m) aerial telescope and observed the positions of 341 stars in the Southern Hemisphere. His observation site is near St Mathew's Church in Hutt's Gate, in the Longwood district. The 680m high hill there is named for him and is called Halley's Mount. Amongst the most significant taxes levied on imports was a requirement for all ships trading with Madagascar to deliver one slave. Slaves were also brought from Asia by incoming shipping. Thus, most slaves came from Madagascar and Asia rather than the African mainland. By 1679, the number of slaves had risen to about 80. An uprising by soldiers and planters in 1684 during the governorship of John Blackmore (1678–1689) led to the death of three mutineers in an attack on Fort James and the later execution of four others. The formation of the Grand Alliance and outbreak of war against France in 1689 meant that for several years ships from Asia avoided the island for fear of being attacked by French men-of-war. Soldiers at the end of their service thereby had restricted opportunities to obtain a passage back to Britain. Governor Joshua Johnson (1690–1693) also prevented soldiers smuggling themselves aboard ships by ordering all outgoing ships to leave only during daylight hours. This led to a mutiny in 1693 in which a group of mutineer soldiers seized a ship and made their escape, during the course of which Governor Johnson was killed. Meanwhile, brutal punishment was meted out to slaves during this period, some being burnt alive and others starved to death. Rumours of an uprising by slaves in 1694 led to the execution of three slaves and punishment of many others.

The clearance of the indigenous forest for the distillation of spirits, tanning and agricultural development began to lead to shortage of wood by the 1680s. The numbers of rats and goats had reached plague proportions by the 1690s, leading to the destruction of food crops and young tree shoots. Neither an increase on duty on the locally produced arrack nor a duty on all firewood helped reduce the deforestation while attempts to reforest the island by governor John Roberts (1708–1711) were not followed up by his immediate successors. The Great Wood, which once extended from Deadwood Plain to Prosperous Bay Plain, was reported in 1710 as not having a single tree left standing. An early mention of the problems of soil erosion was made in 1718 when a waterspout broke over Sandy Bay, on the southern coast. Against the background of this erosion, several years of drought and the general dependency of St Helena, in 1715 governor Isaac Pyke (1714–1719) made the serious suggestion to the Company that appreciable savings could be made by moving the population to Mauritius, evacuated by the French in 1710. However, with the outbreak of war with other European countries, the Company continued to subsidise the island because of its strategic location. An ordinance was passed in 1731 to preserve the woodlands through the reduction in the goat population. Despite the clear connection between deforestation and the increasing number of floods (in 1732, 1734, 1736, 1747, 1756 and 1787) the East India Company's Court of Directors gave little support to efforts by governors to eradicate the goat problem. Rats were observed in 1731 building nests in trees two feet across, a visitor in 1717 commenting that the vast number of wild cats preferred to live off young partridges than the rats. An outbreak of plague in 1743 was attributed to the release of infected rats from ships arriving from India. By 1757, soldiers were employed in killing the wild cats.

William Dampier called into St Helena in 1691 at the end of his first of three circumnavigations of the world and stated Jamestown comprised 20–30 small houses built with rough stones furnished with mean furniture. These houses were only occupied when ships called at the island because their owners were all employed on their plantations further in the island. He described how women born on the island "very earnestly desired to be released from that Prison, having no other way to compass this but by marrying Seamen of Passengers that touch here". Dampier described the island, which he called 'Santa Hellena', in his book A New Voyage Round The World, published in 1697.

Following commercial rivalries between the original English East India Company and a New East India Company created in 1698, a new Company was formed in 1708 by amalgamation, and entitled the "United Company of Merchants of England, trading to the East Indies". St Helena was then transferred to this new United East India Company. The same year, extensive work began to build the present Castle. Because of a lack of cement, mud was used as the mortar for many buildings, most of which had deteriorated into a state of ruin. In a search for lime on the island, a soldier in 1709 claimed to have discovered gold and silver deposits in Breakneck Valley. For a short period, it is believed that almost every able-bodied man was employed in prospecting for these precious metals. The short-lived Breakneck Valley Gold Rush ended with the results of an assay of the deposits in London, showing that they were iron pyrites.

A census in 1723 showed that out of a total population 1,110, some 610 were slaves. In 1731, a majority of tenant planters successfully petitioned governor Edward Byfield (1727–1731) for the reduction of the goat population. The next governor, Isaac Pyke (1731–1738), had a tyrannical reputation but successfully extended tree plantations, improved fortifications and transformed the garrison and militia into a reliable force for the first time. In 1733 Green Tipped Bourbon Coffee seeds were brought from the coffee port of Mokha in Yemen, on a Company ship The Houghton and were planted at various locations around the Island where the plants flourished, despite general neglect.

Robert Jenkins, of "Jenkins' Ear" fame (governor 1740–1742) embarked on a programme of eliminating corruption and improving the defences. The island's first hospital was built on its present site in 1742. Governor Charles Hutchinson (1747–1764) tackled the neglect of crops and livestock and also brought the laws of the island closer to those in England. Nevertheless, racial discrimination continued and it was not until 1787 that the black population were allowed to give evidence against whites. In 1758 three French warships were seen lying off the island in wait for the company's India fleet. In an inconclusive battle, these were engaged by warships from the company's China fleet. Nevil Maskelyne and Robert Waddington set up an observatory in 1761 to observe the transit of Venus, following a suggestion first made by Halley. In the event, observations were obscured by cloud. Most of the cattle were destroyed this year through an unidentified sickness.

In the peak era, a thousands ships per year stopped there leaving the governor to try to police the numerous visitors and to limit the consumption of arrack, made from potatoes. (The mutinies may have been fueled by alcohol.) Because Jamestown was "too raucous with its taverns and brothels", St Paul's Cathedral was built outside the town.

Attempts by governor John Skottowe (1764–1782) to regularise the sale of arrack and punch led to some hostility and desertions by a number of troops who stole boats and were probably mostly lost at sea — however, at least one group of seven soldiers and a slave succeeded in escaping to Brazil in 1770. It was from about this date that the island began, for the first time, to enjoy a prolonged period of prosperity. The first Parish Church in Jamestown had been showing signs of decay for many years, and finally a new building was erected in 1774. St James' is now the oldest Anglican church south of the Equator. Captain James Cook visited the island in 1775 on the final leg of his second circumnavigation of the world.

An order by governor Daniel Corneille (1782–1787) banning garrison troops and sailors from punch-taverns, only allowing them to drink at army canteens, led to a mutiny over Christmas 1783 when some 200 troops skirmished with loyal troops over a three-day period. Courts martial condemned 99 mutineers to death. These mutineers were then decimated; lots were drawn, with one in every ten being shot and executed.

Saul Solomon is believed to have arrived at the island about 1790, where he eventually formed the Solomon's company, initially based at an emporium. Today the Rose and Crown shop occupies the building. Captain Bligh arrived at St Helena in 1792 during his second attempt to ship a cargo of breadfruit trees to Jamaica. That same year saw the importation of slaves made illegal.

In 1795 governor Robert Brooke (1787–1801) was alerted that the French had overrun the Netherlands, forcing the Dutch to become their allies. Some 411 troops were sent from the garrison to support General Sir James Craig in his successful capture of the Dutch colony at the Cape of Good Hope. Fortifications were improved and a new system of visual signalling introduced. Brooke had a battery built at Ladder Hill, and a tower to protect its rearward approaches, known as High Knoll Fort.

As a result of a policy of recruiting time-expired soldiers calling at the island on their voyage home from India, the St Helena Regiment was built up to 1,000 men by 1800. At the same time, every able-bodied man joined the island's militia.

The arrival of a fleet of ships in January 1807 caused an outbreak of measles. The outbreak led to the death of 102 "Blacks" (probably under-reported in church records), and 58 "whites" in the two months to May. With the importation of slaves no longer being legal, Governor Robert Patton (1802–1807) recommended that Company import Chinese labour to grow the rural workforce. The first Chinese labourers arrived in 1810, and the total number rose to about 600 by 1818. After 1836, many were allowed to stay on and their descendants became integrated into the population.

Governor Alexander Beatson (1808–1813) took action to reduce drunkenness by prohibiting the public sale of spirits and the importation of cheap Indian spirits. As in 1787, these actions resulted in a mutiny by about 250 troops in December 1811. After the mutineers surrendered to loyal troops, nine of the mutineers' leaders were executed. Under the aegis of the next governor, Mark Wilks (1813–1816) farming methods were improved, a rebuilding programme initiated, and the first public library opened. A census in 1814 showed the number of inhabitants was 3,507.

== British rule 1815–1821, and Napoleon's exile ==
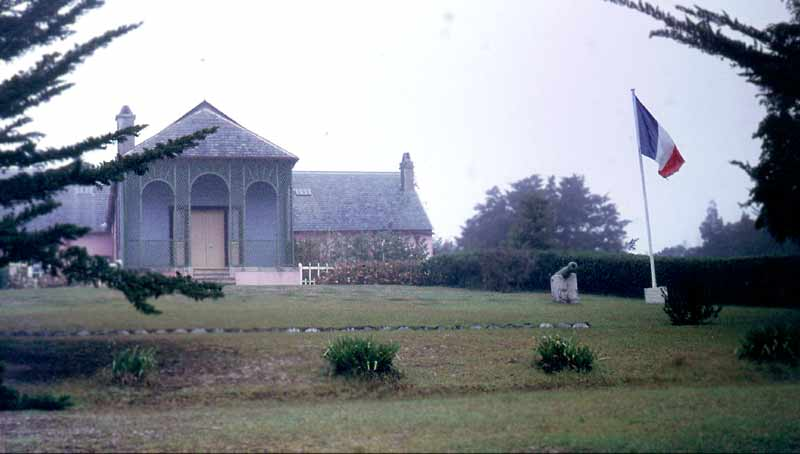
Longwood House, St Helena: site of Napoleon's captivity.

Main text: Napoleon I of France: Exile on Saint Helena

In 1815 the British government selected Saint Helena as the place of detention of Napoleon Bonaparte. He was brought to the island in October 1815 and lodged at Longwood, where he died on 5 May 1821.

During this period the island was strongly garrisoned by regular British regimental troops and by the local St Helena Regiment, with Royal Navy ships circling the island. Agreement was reached that St Helena would be placed in the hands of a general officer of His Majesty's service during Napoleon's confinement. The British government would meet all expenses relating to the prisoner and would be responsible for both his and the island's security. Sir Hudson Lowe (1816–1821), was duly appointed reporting to Lord Bathurst, the Secretary of State for War and the Colonies through the East India Company's Secret Committee in London. Brisk business was enjoyed catering for the additional 2,000 troops and personnel on the island over the six-year period, although restrictions placed against ships landing during this period posed a challenge for local traders to import the necessary goods.

The 1817 census recorded 821 white inhabitants, a garrison of 820 men, 618 Chinese indentured labourers, 500 free blacks and 1,540 slaves. In 1818, while admitting that nowhere in the world did slavery exist in a milder form than on St Helena, Lowe initiated the first step in emancipating the slaves by persuading slave owners to give all slave children born after Christmas of that year their freedom once they had reached their late teens. Solomon Dickson & Taylor issued £147-worth of copper halfpenny tokens sometime before 1821 to enhance local trade.

== British East India Company, 1821–1834 ==
After Napoleon's death the large number of temporary residents, such as military personnel, were soon withdrawn. The East India Company resumed full control of Saint Helena and life returned to the pre-1815 standards, the fall in population causing a sharp change in the economy. The next governors, Thomas Brooke (temporary governor, 1821–1823) and Alexander Walker (1823–1828), successfully brought the island through this post-Napoleonic period with the opening of a new farmer's market in Jamestown, the foundation of an Agricultural and Horticultural Society and improvements in education. The importation of slaves was banned in 1792, but the phased emancipation of over 800 resident slaves did not take place until 1827, some six years before legislation to ban slavery in the colonies was passed by the British Parliament. An abortive attempt was made to set up a whaling industry in 1830 (also in 1875). Following praise of St Helena's coffee given by Napoleon during his exile on the island, the product enjoyed a brief popularity in Paris during the years after his death.

=== British rule, a Crown colony, 1834–1981 ===
The Parliament of the United Kingdom passed the Saint Helena Act in 1833, a provision of which transferred control of St Helena from the East India Company to the Crown with effect from 2 April 1834. In practice, the transfer did not take effect until 24 February 1836 when Major-General George Middlemore (1836–1842), the first governor appointed by the British government, arrived with 91st Regiment troops. He summarily dismissed St Helena Regiment and, following orders from London, embarked on a savage drive to cut administrative costs, dismissing most officers previously in the Company employ. This triggered the start of a long-term pattern whereby those who could afford to do so tended to leave the island for better fortunes and opportunities elsewhere. The population was to fall gradually from 6,150 in 1817 to less than 4,000 by 1890. Charles Darwin spent six days of observation on the island in 1836 during his return journey on HMS Beagle. Controversial figure, Dr. James Barry, also arrived that year as principal medical officer (1836–1837). In addition to reorganising the hospital, Barry highlighted the heavy incidence of venereal diseases in the civilian population, blaming the government for the removal of the St Helena Regiment, which resulted in destitute females resorting to prostitution.

Following the conquest of Aden in January 1839 and the establishment of a coal station there, the journey time to the Far East (via the Mediterranean, the Alexandria to Cairo overland crossing and the Red Sea) was roughly halved compared with the traditional South Atlantic route. This precursor to the effects of the Suez Canal (1869), coupled with the advent of steam shipping that was not dependent on trade winds led to a gradual reduction in the number of ships calling at St Helena and to a decline in its strategic importance to Britain and economic fortunes. (A 2020 report adds that the island's prosperity ended after 1860 when "the Suez Canal shifted trade routes north"/) The number of ships calling at the island fell from 1,100 in 1855; to 853 in 1869; to 603 in 1879 and to only 288 in 1889.

In 1839, London coffee merchants Wm Burnie & Co described St Helena coffee as being of "very superior quality and flavour". In 1840 the British Government deployed a naval station to suppress the African slave trade. The squadron was based at St Helena and a Vice Admiralty Court was based at Jamestown to try the crews of the slave ships. Most of these were broken up and used for salvage. Between 1840 and 1849, 15,076 freed slaves, known as "Liberated Africans" were landed at Rupert's Bay on the island, of which number over 5,000 were dead or died there. The final number up to the 1870s when the depot was finally closed has not yet been accurately determined, but would be over 20,000. Surviving freed slaves lived at Lemon Valley – originally the quarantine area, later for women and children, Rupert's and High Knoll, and only when numbers became too great were they sent to Cape Town and the British West Indies as labourers. About 500 remained on St Helena, where they were employed. In later years, some were sent to Sierra Leone.

It was also in 1840 that the British government acceded to a French request for Napoleon's body to be returned to France in what became known as the retour des cendres. The body, in excellent state of preservation, was exhumed on 15 October 1840 and ceremonially handed over to the Prince de Joinville in the French ship Belle Poule.

A European Regiment, called the St Helena Regiment, comprising five companies was formed in 1842 for the purpose of garrisoning the island. William A Thorpe, the founder of the Thorpe business, was born on the island the same year. There was another outbreak of measles in 1843 and it was noted that none of those who survived the 1807 outbreak contracted the disease a second time. The first Baptist minister arrived from Cape Town in 1845. The same year, St Helena coffee was sold in London at 1d per pound, making it the most expensive and exclusive in the world. In 1846, St James' church was considerably repaired, a steeple replacing the old tower. The same year, huge waves, or "rollers", hit the island causing 13 ships anchored off Jamestown bay to be wrecked. The foundation stone for St Paul's country church, also known as "The Cathedral", was laid in 1850. Following instructions from London to achieve economies, Governor Thomas Gore Brown (1851–1856) further reduced the civil establishment. He also tackled the problems of overpopulation of Jamestown posed by the restrictions of the valley terrain by establishing a village at Rupert's Bay. A census in 1851 showed a total of 6,914 inhabitants living on the island. In 1859 the Diocese of St Helena was set up for St Helena, including Ascension Island and Tristan da Cunha (initially also including the Falkland Islands, Rio de Janeiro and other towns along the east coast of South America), the first Bishop of St Helena arriving on the island that year. Islanders later complained that succeeding governors were mainly retired senior military officers with an undynamic approach to the job. St John's church was built in upper Jamestown in 1857, one motivation being to counter the levels of vice and prostitution at that end of the town.

The following year, the lands forming the sites of Napoleon's burial and of his home at Longwood House were vested in Napoleon III and his heirs and a French representative or consul has lived on the island ever since, the French flag now flying over these areas. The title deeds of Briars Pavilion, where Napoleon lived during his earliest period of exile, were much later given to the French Government in 1959. Coincidentally the Duke of Wellington had also stayed at the property prior to Napoleon, when he was en route home from India.

St Helena coffee grown on the Bamboo Hedge Estate at Sandy Bay won a premier award at the Great Exhibition at the Crystal Palace in 1851. Saul Solomon was buried at St Helena in 1853. The first postage stamp was issued for the island in 1856, the six-pence blue, marking the start of considerable philatelic interest in the island.

By the 1860s it was apparent that wood sourced from some condemned slave ships (possibly a Brazilian ship) from the 1840s were infested by termites ("white ants"). Eating their way through house timbers (also documents) the termites caused the collapse of a number of buildings and considerable economic damage over several decades. Extensive reconstruction made use of iron rails and termite-proof timbers. The termite problem persists to the present day. The cornerstone for St Matthew's church at Hutt's Gate was laid in 1861.

The withdrawal of the British naval station in 1864 and closure of the Liberated African Station ten years later (several hundred Africans were deported to Lagos and other places on the West African coast) resulted in a further deterioration in the economy. A small earthquake was recorded the same year. The gaol in Rupert's Bay was destroyed and the Castle and Supreme Court were reconstructed in 1867. Cinchona plants were introduced in 1868 by Charles Elliot (1863–1870) with a view to exporting quinine but the experiment was abandoned by his successor Governor C. G. E. Patey (1870–1873), who also embarked on a programme of reducing the civil establishment. The latter action led to another phase of emigration from the island. An experiment in 1874 to produce flax from Phomium Tenax (New Zealand flax) failed (the cultivation of flax recommenced in 1907 and eventually became the island's largest export). In 1871, the Royal Engineers constructed Jacob's Ladder up the steep side of the valley from Jamestown to Knoll Mount Fort, with 700 steps, one step being covered over in later repairs. A census in 1881 showed 5,059 inhabitants lived on the island. Jonathan, claimed to be the world's oldest tortoise, is thought to have arrived on the island in 1882.

An outbreak of measles in 1886 resulted in 113 cases and 8 deaths. Jamestown was lighted for the first time in 1888, the initial cost being borne by the inhabitants. Dinuzulu kaCetshwayo, son of the Zulu king Cetshwayo, was exiled at St Helena between 1890 and 1897. Diphtheria broke out in 1887 and also in 1893 which, with an additional outbreak of whooping cough, led to the death of 31 children under 10. In 1890 a great fall of rock killed nine people in Jamestown, a fountain being erected in Main Street in their memory. A census in 1891 showed 4,116 inhabitants lived on the island. A submarine cable en route to Britain from Cape Town was landed in November 1899 and extended to Ascension by December and was operated by the Eastern Telegraph Company. For the next two years over six thousand Boer prisoners were imprisoned at Deadwood and Broadbottom. The population reached its all-time record of 9,850 in 1901. Although a number of prisoners died, being buried at Knollcombes, the islanders and Boers developed a relationship of mutual respect and trust, a few Boers choosing to remain on the island when the war ended in 1902. A severe outbreak of influenza in 1900 led to the death of 3.3% of the population, although it affected neither the Boer prisoners nor the troops guarding them. An outbreak of whooping cough in 1903 infected most children on the island, although only one died as a result.

The departure of the Boers and later removal of the remaining garrison in 1906 (with the disbandment of the St Helena Volunteers, this was the first time the island was left without a garrison) both impacted on the island economy, which was only slightly offset by growing philatelic sales. The successful reestablishment of the flax industry in 1907 did much to counter these problems, generating considerable income during the war years. Lace making was encouraged as an island-industry during the pre-war period, initiated by Emily Jackson in 1890 and a lace-making school was opened in 1908. Two men, known as the Prosperous Bay Murderers, were hanged in 1905. A paper published in 2017 has proved that reports of a fish-canning factory opening and closing in 1909 because of an unusual shortage of fish are incorrect. The diamond merchant and philanthropist Alfred Mosely funded cured mackerel production in 1910. Packed in barrels, the product sold at a loss in New York and the industry was therefore ended. Governor Gallwey used the word "factory" in an unusual form, referring a team of workers working in the open on Jamestown's wharf. Fish catches were greater than in 1909. It has also been shown that in 1912, Mosely also unsuccessfully petitioned authorities to allow most of St Helena's population to emigrate to Coronado, California. S.S. Papanui, en route from Britain to Australia with emigrants, arrived in James Bay in 1911 on fire, possibly due to spontaneous combustion of coal stored in a thermally-insulated hold. The ship burned out and sank, but its 364 passengers and crew were rescued and looked after on the island. A census in 1911 showed the population had fallen from its peak in 1901 to only 3,520 inhabitants. Some 4,800 rats tails were presented to the Government in 1913, who paid a penny per tail.

A review has been published of St Helena's wartime period. Islanders were made aware of their vulnerability to naval attack, despite extensive fortifications, following a visit by a fleet of three German super-dreadnoughts in January 1914. With the outbreak of World War I, the defunct St Helena Volunteer Corps was re-established. In the absence of infantry forces, a policy of defensive strongholds was adopted in the event of an invasion. Considerable pressure was put on islanders to volunteer to serve in the overseas forces, but this was always on a voluntary basis. Some 46 islanders volunteered to fight abroad, the war memorials on the wharf and at St Paul's Church (which differ in detail) showing some eight men lost their lives during the conflict. The self-proclaimed Sultan of Zanzibar, Seyyid Khalid Bin Barghash, was exiled in St Helena from 1917 to 1921 before being transferred to the Seychelles. Parliamentary criticism was voiced when Governor Cordeaux took a 31-month leave of absence from March 1917. A petition for the replacement of Acting Governor Dixon was raised in 1918. This followed a period of food shortages. The 1918 world pandemic of influenza bypassed St Helena.

William A. Thorpe was killed in an accident in 1918, his business continuing to operate on the island to the present day. In 1920 the Norwegian ship Spangereid caught fire and sank at her mooring at James Bay, depositing quantities of coal on the beach below the wharf. A census in 1921 showed the islands population was 3,747. The first islanders left to work at Ascension Island in 1921, which was made a dependency of St Helena in 1922. Thomas R. Bruce (postmaster 1898–1928) was the first islander to design a postage stamp, the 1922–1937 George V ship-design—this significantly contributed to island revenues for several years. South African coinage became legal tender in 1923, reflecting the high level of trade with that country. There were nine deaths from whooping cough between 1920 and 1929 and 2,200 cases of measles in 1932. The first car, an Austin 7, was imported into the island in 1929. A census in 1931 showed a population of 3,995 (and a goat population of nearly 1,500). Cable and Wireless absorbed the Eastern Telegraph Company in 1934. Tristan da Cunha was made a dependency of St Helena in 1938.

Some six islanders gave their lives during World War II. The German battle cruiser Admiral Graf Spee was observed passing the island in 1939 and the British oil tanker RFA Darkdale was torpedoed off Jamestown bay in October 1941. As part of the Lend-Lease agreement, America built Wideawake airport on Ascension in 1942, but no military use was made of St Helena. As in the previous war, the island enjoyed increased revenues through the sale of flax.

There were 217 cases of polio, including 11 deaths, in 1945. A census in 1946 showed 4,748 inhabitants lived on the island. In 1948 there were seven deaths from whooping cough and 77 hospital admissions from acute nephritis. In 1951, mumps attacked 90% of the population. Solomon's became a limited company the same year. Flax prices continued to rise after the war, rising to their zenith in 1951. However, this St Helena staple industry fell into decline because of competition from synthetic fibres and also because the delivered price of the island's flax was substantially higher than world prices. The decision by a major buyer, the British Post Office, to use synthetic fibres for their mailbags was a major blow, all of which contributed in the closure of the island's flax mills in 1965. Many acres of land are still covered with flax plants. A census in 1956 showed the population had fallen only slightly, to 4,642. 1957 witnessed the arrival of three Bahrain princes as prisoners of Britain, who remained until released by a writ of habeas corpus in 1960. Another attempt to operate a fish cannery led to closure in 1957. From 1958, the Union Castle shipping line gradually reduced their service calls to the island. The same year, there were 36 cases of poliomyelitis. A census in 1966 showed a relatively unchanged population of 4,649 inhabitants.

A South African company (The South Atlantic Trading and Investment Corporation, SATIC) bought a majority share in Solomon and Company in 1968. Following several years of losses and to avoid the economic effects of a closure of the company, the St Helena government eventually bought a majority share in the company in 1974. In 1969 the first elections were held under the new constitution for twelve-member Legislative Council. By 1976, the population had grown slightly to 5,147 inhabitants. Based from Avonmouth, Curnow Shipping replaced the Union-Castle Line mailship service in 1977, using the RMS St Helena, a coastal passenger and cargo vessel that had been used between Vancouver and Alaska. Due to structural weakness, the spire of St James' church was demolished in 1980. The endemic flowering shrub, the St Helena Ebony, believed to have been extinct for over a century, was rediscovered on the island in 1981.

== 1981 to present ==
The British Nationality Act 1981 reclassified St Helena and the other crown colonies as British Dependent Territories. The islanders lost their status as 'Citizens of the United Kingdom and Colonies' (as defined in the British Nationality Act 1948) and were stripped of their right of abode in Britain. For the next 20 years, many could find only low-paid work with the island government and the only available employment overseas for the islanders was restricted to the Falkland Islands and Ascension Island, a period during which the island was often referred to as the "South Atlantic Alcatraz".

The RMS St Helena was requisitioned in 1982 by the Ministry of Defence to help in support of the Falklands Conflict, and sailed south with the entire crew volunteering for duty. The ship was involved in supporting minesweeper operations but the volunteers were refused South Atlantic Medals. The then Prince Andrew (later Andrew Mountbatten-Windsor) began his relationship with St Helena in 1984 with a visit to the island as a member of the armed forces.

The 1987 census showed that the island population stood at 5,644. The Development & Economic Planning Department, which still operates, was formed in 1988 to contribute to raising the living standards of the people of St Helena by planning and managing sustainable economic development through education, participation and planning, improving decision making by providing statistical information and by improving the safety and operation of the wharf and harbour operations. After decades of planning, the realisation of the three-tier school system began in 1988 under the aegis of the Head of Education, Basil George, when the Prince Andrew School was opened for all pupils of 12 onwards. Middle schools would take the 8- to 12-year-old children and the First schools from 5-year-olds.

The then Prince Andrew launched the replacement RMS St Helena in 1989 at Aberdeen. The vessel was specially built for the Cardiff–Cape Town route, and featured a mixed cargo/passenger layout. At the same time, a shuttle service between St Helena and Ascension was planned, for the many Saint Helenians working there and on the Falklands. In 1995 the decision was made to base the ship from Cape Town and limit the number of trips to the UK to just four a year.

The 1988 St Helena Constitution took effect in 1989 and provided that the island would be governed by a Governor and Commander-in-Chief, and an Executive and Legislative Council. The Executive Council members would be elected for nomination by the elected members of the Legislative Council, and subsequently appointed by the Governor and could only be removed from office by the votes of a majority of the five members of the Legislative Council. The Legislative Council Members would be re-elected by the voters every four years. With few exceptions the Governor would be obliged to abide by the advice given to him by the Executive Council. Five Council Committees would be made up from the membership of the Legislative Council and civil servants so that at any time there would always be a majority of elected members. The five chairpersons of these committees would comprise the elected membership of the Executive Council.

The Bishop's Commission on Citizenship was established at the Fifteenth Session of Diocesan Synod in 1992 with the aim of restoring full citizenship of the islanders and restore the right of abode in the UK. Research began (Prof. T. Charlton) in 1993, two years before its introduction on the island and five years after, to measure the influence that television has on the behaviour of children in classrooms and school playgrounds. This concluded that the island children continued to be hard working and very well behaved and that family and community social controls were more important in shaping children's behaviour than exposure to television. The Island of St Helena Coffee Company was founded in 1994 by David Henry. Using Green Tipped Bourbon Coffee plants imported in 1733, crops were grown on several sites, including the Bamboo Hedge Estate Sandy Bay estate used for the 1851 Great Exhibition entry. In 1997, the acute employment problem at St Helena was brought to the attention of the British public following reports in the tabloid press of a "riot" following an article in the Financial Times describing how the Governor, David Smallman (1995–1999), was jostled by a small crowd who believed he and the Foreign Office had rejected plans to build an airport on the island.

Hong Kong was handed back to China in 1997, and the same year the British government published a review of the Dependent Territories. This included a commitment to restore the pre-1981 status for citizenship. This was effected by the British Overseas Territories Act 2002, which restored full passports to the islanders, and renamed the Dependent Territories the British Overseas Territories. The St Helena National Trust was also formed the same year with the aim of promoting the island's unique environmental and culture heritage. A full census in February 1998 showed the total population (including the RMS) was 5,157 persons.

In a vote held in January 2002, a majority of islanders (at home and abroad) voted in favour for an airport to be built. The island's two-floor museum situated in a building near the base of Jacob's Ladder was opened the same year and is operated by the St Helena Heritage Society. The Bank of St Helena, located next to the Post Office, commenced operations in 2004, inheriting the assets and accounts of the former St Helena Government Savings and the Ascension Island Savings Banks, both of which then ceased to exist. In April 2005 the British Government announced plans to construct an airport on Saint Helena to bolster the Island's economy, and reduce the dependence on boats to supply the Island. Impregilo S.p.A. of Milan were selected as the preferred tender to design, build and operate the airport, which was expected to be open in 2012/13, although final UK ministerial approval had still not been given. The following December, DfID announced they and the "Treasury are in continuing discussions about issues of concern regarding access to St Helena. As a result, there will be a pause in negotiations over the St Helena airport contract". This was widely interpreted as meaning the project was in abeyance, probably for a number of years until the UK's economy recovers. In March 2009, DfID announced the launch of a new consultation on options for access to the island. In a parliamentary debate in which DfID were accused of delaying tactics, the ministry accepted the conclusion in their 2005 Access document but argued good fiscal management required this to be re-reviewed. In December 2008, the British Government decided not to go ahead at that time with the long-promised airport. When the airport eventually opens, the Royal Mail ship will cease operations soon after flights begin. Saint Helena Airport was finally completed on Prosperous Bay Plain in 2016, but its opening was delayed by concerns regarding wind shear. The first scheduled commercial airline flight landed on 14 October 2017.

A census held in February 2008 showed the population (including the RMS) had fallen to 4,255. In the first half of 2008, areas of the cliff above the wharf were stabilised from rock falls with netting at a cost of approximately £3 million. On 14 August, about 200 tons of rock fell from the west side of Jamestown severely damaging the Baptist chapel and surrounding buildings. Plans are in hand to net the most dangerous sections of the mountains either side of Jamestown over the period to 2015 at an estimated cost of about £15 million.

A comparative review of the different sources for the history of St Helena has been published on the St Helena Institute web site.

Until 2017, travel to the island required a long trip by boat. An airport was constructed and the first flight arrived in October 2017. Because of "dangerous wind conditions" that made landing large aircraft unsafe, only smaller aircraft are used for the five hour trip from South Africa. Passenger service on the Royal Mail ship was discontinued in 2018.

The travel restrictions imposed due to the COVID-19 pandemic had a very negative effect on tourism in 2020 and extending into 2021. One news report in August 2020 stated that the costs imposed by the pandemic led to the "collapse of the island's tourism sector, which was meant to drive its economic development".

== History of British and other Royal visitors ==
One commentator has observed that, notwithstanding the high unemployment resulting from the loss of full passports during 1981–2002, the level of loyalty to the British monarchy by the St Helena population is probably not exceeded in any other part of the world.

The first royal visit is speculated to have been by Prince Rupert of the Rhine (1619–1682), probably on his voyage home in India. No contemporary documents exist, but no other explanation has been given for naming Rupert's Bay, adjacent to Jamestown.

The Prince de Joinville arrived in 1840 to return the body of Napoleon I to France. The Prince Alfred visited the island in 1860 en route to Tristan Da Cunha. Empress Eugénie (widow of Napoleon III) arrived in 1880 and the same year Prince Henry of Prussia arrived in a German frigate. The Duke of Connaught arrived in 1911 on his journey back from Cape Town. The Prince of Wales (later Edward VIII) visited in 1925.

George VI is the only reigning monarch to visit the island. This was in 1947 when the King, accompanied by Queen Elizabeth (later Queen Elizabeth the Queen Mother), Princess Elizabeth (later Elizabeth II) and Princess Margaret were travelling from South Africa.

The Duke of Edinburgh arrived at St Helena in 1957 and then his son Prince Andrew visited as a member of the armed forces in 1984. His sister the Princess Royal arrived in 2002.

The last serving British Ministerial visit was in 1699.

== History of the media in St Helena ==
The St Helena Press was set up by Saul Soloman in 1806 and produced a number of publications including the Government Gazette (from 1807) and the St Helena Monthly Register (from 1809), both government funded publications. The press was taken over after the departure of governor Alexander Beatson (1808–13), and was mainly used for government notices and regulations. The first of an occasional series St Helena Almanack and Annual Registers was published with the press in 1842 (the last and most comprehensive edition being published in 1913).

The St Helena Advocate and Weekly Journal of News, published in 1851, was the first island newspaper, but closed two years later mainly due to competition from the government-funded St Helena Chronicle (1852). This short publication period was a fate suffered by most island newspapers. The St Helena Herald was published from 1853 but ceased publication in 1860 when the editor launched a new paper, the St Helena Record. This closed in 1861 and was immediately replaced by the longest running paper, the St Helena Guardian (weekly, 1861–1925). The proprietor of the latter, Benjamin Grant, also published the St Helena Advertiser (1865–1866).

Two other newspapers published about this time, the St Helena Advertiser, the St Helena Star (1866–1867) and St Helena Spectator (1866–1868) both closed because of the lack of printing facilities. Two humorous papers, The Bug (1888) and the Mosquito (1888) were similarly short-lived. Several short-lived papers also appeared a few years later – the St Helena Times (1889), the Monthly Critic and Flashman (1895) and the St Helena Observer. De Krisgsgevangenewas, a censored Dutch newspaper, was published for Boer prisoners from 1901.

The St Helena Church News was published from 1888, the Parish Magazine from 1889, the Diocesan Magazine from 1901 and the Jamestown Monthly from 1912 The latter was renamed the St Helena Church Magazine and was published until 1945 by Canon Wallcot, who extended news coverage from church matters to also include island news after the closure of the St Helena Guardian. The government-funded St Helena Wirebird was published in the early 1960s, closing in 1965. The government-funded St Helena News Review and the St Helena News followed this. Between 1990 and 1991, the New Wirebird was published independently.

Radio St Helena started operations on Christmas Day 1967, transmissions being limited to the island apart from occasional short-wave broadcasts. The station presented news, features and music in collaboration with its sister newspaper, the St Helena Herald, published by the partially publicly funded St Helena News Media Services (SHNMS) since 2000. The non-government funded Saint FM Radio officially launched in January 2005. The station currently broadcasts news, features and music across the island, Ascension, the Falklands and worldwide over the internet in collaboration with its sister newspaper, the St Helena Independent (published since November 2005). Both the Herald and Independent can be read worldwide via the internet. Cable and Wireless currently rebroadcast television throughout the island via three DStv channels of entertainment.

In October 2008, the St Helena Government announced that island's media must choose whether they obtained revenue from government subsidies or from advertising. They could not do both. On this basis, the partly publicly subsidised Media Services, which publish the St Helena Herald and broadcast on Radio St Helena, would no longer be allowed to run advertisements. Simultaneously, the St Helena Independent and Saint FM announced that they would need to increase advertising rates, which barely covered the cost of producing adverts.

The St. Helena Herald closed down in 2012, its last edition being on Friday 9 March.

SaintFM closed down on Friday 21 December 2012. The reasons for its closure can be read on its page: Saint FM.

Radio St. Helena closed down at Midnight on Christmas Day, 25 December 2012. This left the island with no broadcast radio.

SaintFM Community Radio launched at 8am on 10 March 2013, taking over the studios and frequencies of the former Saint FM. See Saint fm community radio. The station is also available via the TuneIn app. Broadband, Mobile, Home Phone & TV | Sure Saint Helena

As of October 2020, the Saint Helena Island Info website listed three active stations, two operated by South Atlantic Media Services: S.A.M.S. Radio 1 (news, features and entertainment), S.A.M.S. Radio 2 (relay of the BBC World Service) and the SaintFM Community Radio.

== Communications and television ==
One company, Sure South Atlantic, provides "broadband, mobile phone, national & international telephone, public Internet and television re-broadcast services" for the island.

In December 2019, the government signed a contract with Google to connect St Helena Island to the Equiano Subsea Fibre Optic Cable. The project was financed by the European Development Fund. The first branch of the Equiano Subsea Cable was landed in August 2021 on Ruperts Beach. Since September 2023 the island is connected to it.

== Ecological significance ==
Saint Helena has been a very integral part of man's exploration of the Earth and development of sciences, especially ecological sciences. When the island was first discovered, it was one of the most isolated and pristine piece of land ever encountered by humans. This, along with its relatively small size, allowed ecologists to study the effects of man and time with limited variables. Richard Grove, Author of Green Imperialism, among other works, explains how imperialist deforestation of Saint Helena made apparent for the first time the devastating effects humans can have on the world around them. Saint Helena Island was famous for the work that Georg Forster and Johann Reinhold Forster performed on the famous Cook Voyage aboard HMS Resolution in 1775. This voyage was the beginning of ecological conservatism. Before any ideas of conservatism, there were economic factors causing the destruction of Saint Helena, but also colonial ideology behind the mass destruction of tropical landscapes throughout the last 400 years. The deforestation of Saint Helena by European East India Companies in the 15th and 16th centuries led to one of the first ecological legislation, the Forest Act of Saint Helena.

The Forsters' Resolution voyage with Captain James Cook was motivated to discover a connection between nature and human development. At first, they believed that nature must have some sort of effect on human development which could answer why there are different levels of development throughout the world. However, their discoveries on Saint Helena Island were to the contrary, they found that man has more effect on nature than they originally believed. After allowing human destructive power to reach Saint Helena, the Forsters noticed flooding from the removal of vegetation and mass slaughter of the turtle population. The consequence of the imperial destruction was a fundamental understanding of the importance of vegetal cover in the tropical environment. Other writers, such as Peter Kalm who wrote about deforestation and draught in North America without connecting the two phenomena, influenced the Forsters' theories on the importance of vegetation.

The Forster expedition started the ecological study of Saint Helena, but others have been studying the island since then. Because the island has been extremely affected by human interaction and destruction, scientists have attempted to discern the original vegetal makeup of the island. A scientific study is the only way to determine the original vegetation because there is no direct evidence of plant life from when the island was discovered. One study determined that because the island is volcanic in nature, any plant life existing on the island would have travelled there from elsewhere. It is most likely that the original plant life would have travelled from southern Africa because of the south-easterly prevailing winds and currents.

== Notes ==
- Gosse, Philip Saint Helena, 1502–1938 ISBN 0-904614-39-5
- Smallman, David L., Quincentenary, a Story of St Helena, 1502–2002 ISBN 1-872229-47-6
- Jackson, E. L. St Helena: The Historic Island, Ward, Lock & Co, London, 1903
- Cannan, Edward Churches of the South Atlantic Islands 1502–1991 ISBN 0-904614-48-4
- George, Barbara B. St Helena – the Chinese Connection ISBN 0-18-994892-2
- Cross, Tony St Helena including Ascension Island and Tristan Da Cunha ISBN 0-7153-8075-3
- Brooke, T. H., A History of the Island of St Helena from its Discovery by the Portuguese to the Year 1806, Printed for Black, Parry and Kingsbury, London, 1808
- Hakluyt, The Principal Navigations Voyages Traffiques & Discoveries of the English Nation, from the Prosperous Voyage of M. Thomas Candish esquire into the South Sea, and so around about the circumference of the whole earth, begun in the yere 1586, and finished 1588, 1598–1600, Volume XI.
- Darwin, Charles, Geological Observations on the Volcanic Islands, Chapter 4, Smith, Elder & Co., London, 1844.
- Duncan, Francis, A Description of the Island of St Helena Containing Observations on its Singular Structure and Formation and an Account of its Climate, Natural History, and Inhabitants, London, Printed For R Phillips, 6 Bridge Street, Blackfriars, 1805
- Janisch, Hudson Ralph, Extracts from the St Helena Records, Printed and Published at the "Guardian" Office by Benjamin Grant, St Helena, 1885
- Van Linschoten, Iohn Huighen, His Discours of Voyages into ye Easte & West Indies, Wolfe, London, 1598
- Melliss, John C. M., St Helena: A Physical, Historical and Topographical Description of the Island Including Geology, Fauna, Flora and Meteorology, L. Reeve & Co, London, 1875
- Schulenburg, A.H., St Helena Historiography, Philately, and the "Castella" Controversy, South Atlantic Chronicle: The Journal of the St. Helena, Ascension and Tristan da Cunha Philatelic Society, Vol. XXIII, No.3, pp. 3–6, 1999
- Bruce, I. T., Thomas Buce: St Helena Postmaster and Stamp Designer, Thirty years of St Helena, Ascension and Tristan Philately, pp. 7–10, 2006, ISBN 1-890454-37-0
- Crallan, Hugh, Island of St Helena, Listing and Preservation of Buildings of Architectural and Historic Interest, 1974
- Kitching, G. C., A Handbook of St Helena Including a short History of the island Under the Crown
- Eriksen, Ronnie, St Helena Lifeline, Mallet & Bell Publications, Norfolk, 1994, ISBN 0-620-15055-6
- Denholm, Ken, South Atlantic Haven, a Maritime History for the Island of St Helena, published and printed by the Education Department of the Government of St Helena
- Evans, Dorothy, Schooling in the South Atlantic Islands 1661–1992, Anthony Nelson, 1994, ISBN 0-904614-51-4
- Hibbert, Edward, St Helena Postal History and Stamps, Robson Lowe Limited, London, 1979
- Weider, Ben & Hapgood, David The Murder of Napoleon (1999) ISBN 1-58348-150-8 contains descriptions of the island and its inhabitants at the time of Napoleon's incarceration. A much more comprehensive list of inhabitants between 1815 and 1821 is provided by Chaplin, Arnold, A St Helena's Who's Who or a Directory of the Island During the Captivity of Napoleon, published by the author in 1914. This has recently been republished under the title Napoleon's Captivity on St Helena 1815–1821, Savannah Paperback Classics, 2002, ISBN 1-902366-12-3
