= HMS Swallow =

Thirty-nine vessels of the Royal Navy and its predecessors have borne the name Swallow, (Note: In accordance with Wikipedia naming conventions, this index does not use the prefix HMS for ships before 1660. The term "His Majesty's Ship" was introduced around 1660 and was routinely abbreviated HMS from about 1780 onwards.) as has one dockyard craft, one naval vessel of the British East India Company, and at least two revenue cutters, all after the bird, the Swallow:

- English ship Mary Fortune (1497) was a ship launched in 1497, renamed Swallow when rebuilt in 1512.
- English ship Swallow (1544) was a 53-gun ship launched in 1544, rebuilt in 1558 and 1580 and sold in 1603.
- English ship Swallow (1558) was a discovery vessel listed in the Arctic in 1558 and captured by the Spanish in 1568.
- English ship Swallow (1573) was an 8-gun pinnace built in 1573 and condemned in 1603.
- English ship Swallow (1583) was a vessel listed in Newfoundland in 1583.
- English ship Swallow (1634) was a 40-gun ship launched in 1634. She served in the Royalist Navy from 1648 and was sold in 1653.
- English ship Swallow (1657) was a 6-gun ketch launched in 1657 and given to the Irish Packet Service in 1661.
- HMS Swallow (1660) was a 40-gun ship launched in 1653 as Gainsborough. She was renamed HMS Swallow in 1660 and was wrecked in 1692.
- HMS Swallow (1661) was a 6-gun ketch purchased 1661, sold 1674.
- HMS Swallow (1672) was a 2-gun sloop launched in 1672 and lost in 1673.
- HMS Swallow (1699) was a 6-gun sloop launched in 1699 and captured by a French privateer in 1703.
- HMS Swallow (1703) was a 54-gun fourth rate launched in 1703, rebuilt in 1719 and broken up in 1728.
- HMS Swallow (1732) was a 60-gun fourth rate launched in 1732. She was renamed HMS Princess Louisa in 1737 and was broken up in 1742.
- HMS Swallow (1744) was a Merlin-class sloop launched in 1744 as HMS Galgo. She was renamed Swallow that year, but was wrecked at the end of 1744.
- HMS Swallow (1745) was a 14-gun Merlin-class sloop launched in 1745, used as an exploration ship from 1763 and sold in 1769.
- HMS Swallow (1769) was a 14-gun Swallow-class ship sloop launched in 1769. She foundered in 1778.
- HMS Swallow (1779) was a 14-gun brig-rigged sloop launched in 1779 and driven ashore in 1781.
- HMS Swallow (1781) was a 16-gun brig-rigged sloop, previously a cutter purchased on the stocks and launched in 1781. She was sold in 1795. She became a West Indiaman and a hired armed vessel for the British government. She captured some prizes and was last listed in 1799.
- HMS Swallow (1795) was an 18-gun brig-sloop launched in 1795 and sold in 1802. She then became a privateer, and a whaler.
- HMS Swallow (1805) was an 18-gun Cruizer-class brig-sloop launched in 1805 and broken up in 1815.
- HMS Swallow (1824) was a 10-gun brig-sloop, formerly the packet Marquis of Salisbury. She was purchased in 1824 and sold in 1836.
- HMS Swallow (1831) was a wooden paddle packet, previously the General Post Office vessel Ferret. She was launched in 1831, transferred to the Royal Navy in 1837 and was broken up in 1848.
- HMS Swallow (1854) was a Swallow-class sloop launched in 1854 and sold in 1866.
- HMS Swallow (1868) was a Plover-class gunvessel launched in 1868 and sold in 1882.
- HMS Swallow (1885) was a Nymphe-class sloop launched in 1885 and sold in 1904.
- HMS Swallow (1918) was an S-class destroyer launched in 1918, handed over to the breakers in part payment for RMS Majestic in 1936, and subsequently broken up.
- HMS Swallow was to have been a C-class destroyer. She was renamed HMS Caprice in 1942 and launched in 1943.
- HMS Swallow (P242) was a Peacock-class patrol corvette launched in 1984. She was sold to the Irish Naval Service in 1988 and renamed LÉ Ciara.

One small vessel of the East India Company's Bombay Marine (its naval arm), also bore the name Swallow:

- Swallow of 1770 was a 14-gun ketch launched in 1770 at Bombay, and lost in 1776.

== See also ==
- Swallow (Royal Navy tender): at least two vessels named Swallow have served the Royal Navy as ship's tenders, one from 1793 to 1795, and a second from 1811 to 1825.
- HMS Swallow Prize
- HM Revenue Cutter Swallow - one of several vessels by that name
