= Dutch invasion of Saint Helena =

Successful occupation of Saint Helena

- Part of the Third Anglo-Dutch War
- Location of Saint Helena
Date	January 1673
Location	Saint Helena, South Atlantic 15°55′28″S 5°43′5″W
Result	Dutch victory

Belligerents
Dutch Republic	Kingdom of England: East India Company

Commanders and leaders
Jacob de Gens	Anthony Beale

The Dutch invasion of Saint Helena took place in January 1673, capturing the South Atlantic island from the English East India Company (EIC). The Dutch had previously settled the island but abandoned it for their colony at modern-day Cape Town. The Cape proved an inferior anchorage so the Dutch took advantage of the Third Anglo-Dutch War to seize Saint Helena, with little resistance from the EIC garrison.

The EIC governor, Anthony Beale, escaped to Brazil with a number of soldiers and slaves. He sent word of the loss of the island by sloop, which met with a Royal Navy squadron commanded by Richard Munden. Munden decided to retake the island and in May landed a force under Lieutenant Richard Keigwin. A bombardment by Munden's squadron persuaded the Dutch to surrender. Keigwin was left on the island as governor with an increased garrison. The invasion was the last occasion that the island was taken by a foreign power.

== Background ==
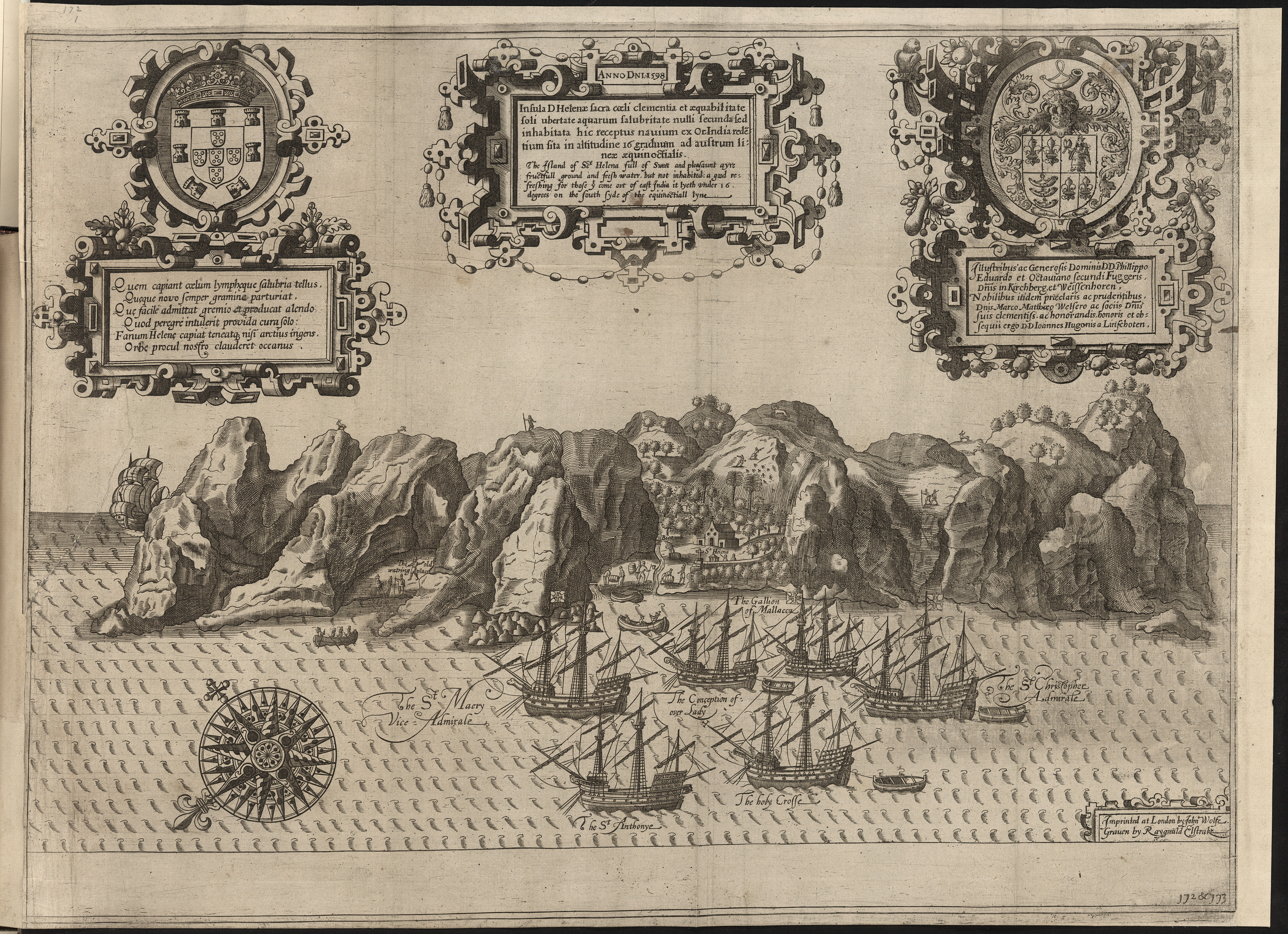
Dutch ships at Saint Helena, 1598

Saint Helena, an island in the South Atlantic, was discovered by the Portuguese explorer João da Nova in 1502. English, Portuguese and Dutch sailors visited the islands throughout the next century. A Dutch settlement was established around 1645 but was gone by 1651, being abandoned in favour of the settlement at Cape Town in Southern Africa. An English East India Company (EIC) expedition, sent on the orders of Lord Protector Oliver Cromwell, landed on Saint Helena on 5 May 1659 and established a fort, the Castle of St John. After the Stuart Restoration in 1660 the fort was renamed James Fort in honour of James, Duke of York, and the settlement that had grown nearby as Jamestown. In the following years Saint Helena proved valuable to the East India Company as an anchorage and source of supplies for the company's vessels.

== Dutch invasion ==
The Dutch found the Cape inferior as a harbour compared to Saint Helena. The Third Anglo-Dutch War (1672–74) provided an opportunity to reclaim the island. A Dutch Navy expedition under Jacob de Gens, left the Cape in late 1672. In January 1673 the Dutch landed at Lemon Valley to the west of Jamestown. They attempted to advance up the steep ravine but were driven back by English settlers who threw down rocks from higher ground. The Dutch reboarded their vessels and landed further to the west, overpowering a defending English force and reaching the higher land. By some accounts treachery may have played a part in the English defeat. The governor of Saint Helena, Anthony Beale, spiked the garrison's guns (which were more numerous than those brought by the Dutch), spoiled the gunpowder and transferred several valuable items onto his ship before escaping to Colonial Brazil. The island was left in possession of the Dutch, who garrisoned the fort, which they renamed Good Fortune.

== Recapture by English forces ==
Recapture of Saint Helena
- Part of the Third Anglo-Dutch War
- Relief map of Saint Helena
Date	4–5 May 1673
Location	Saint Helena, South Atlantic
Result	English victory

Belligerents
Dutch Republic	England

Commanders and leaders
Jacob de Gens	Richard Munden

Beale hired a sloop in Brazil and sent a number of soldiers and slaves away in it to warn English vessels that the island had been lost. The sloop met with a Royal Navy and EIC expedition under Captain Richard Munden who had been sent to reinforce the garrison of Saint Helena. Munden, whose squadron included the frigate HMS Assistance decided, without receiving any direct orders, to retake the island.

Munden sailed to Fisher's Valley at the east of the island, where a stream ran to Prosperous Bay from Diana's Peak. The stream fell down a 150 feet (46 m) high vertical rockface close to the shore. One of Beale's slaves, Black Oliver, knew a route up this cliff face and on 4 May, he and a party of Munden's men, led by Assistance's lieutenant Richard Keigwin, were landed here after dark. One of Keigwin's men, named Tom, was the first to climb, carrying a rope that was used to haul up the rest of the party. The following men's shouts of "hold fast, Tom!" led to this location's modern name of Hold Fast Tom. The location would have been unassailable if defended by the Dutch but they had no men to spare for its defence. Keigwin's party now had access to high land which overlooked the interior of the fort and would render it indefensible.

Whilst Keigwin's party was starting its climb Munden sailed to the fort and began to bombard it. For a long while, as he waited for the rest of his squadron to arrive, Munden took the brunt of the fort's response in a single vessel. The Dutch surrendered at 6 pm on 5 May, before the arrival of Keigwin's men. Munden discovered that Dutch ships were expected to arrive in the coming days and left the Dutch flag flying from Sugar Loaf Hill as a ruse of war. He was able to capture most of a convoy that arrived in the port.

== Aftermath ==
The EIC sent regular troops to reinforce the garrison of Saint Helena and later that year organised a feudal militia from the settlers to defend the island. The 1673 invasion was the last time the island was captured by a foreign power.

Upon his return to England Munden received a knighthood for his actions on Saint Helena. He remained in the navy on convoy duties until his death in England in 1680 at the age of 39. Keigwin remained on the island as governor, before being transferred to India. He rose to higher military and political rank but fell out with the EIC's hierarchy and was recalled. He led a revolt against the EIC in December 1683 and seized power as unofficial governor of Bombay, serving for almost a year before surrendering, upon receiving a pardon. He was later appointed to command Assistance and died in 1690 during an assault on Basseterre, Saint Kitts. The location of his landing in Prosperous Bay is still known as Keigwin's Rock. Black Oliver was granted his freedom for his actions in the recapture of Saint Helena and was given a tract of land, the modern estate of Walbro near Hutt's Gate; he was later hanged for involvement in a mutiny. Many of the soldiers in Munden's expedition were also granted land on Saint Helena and settled there.

== Bibliography ==
- Kitching, G. C. (1947). "The St. Helena Regiments of the East India Company". Journal of the Society for Army Historical Research. 25 (101): 2–8. ISSN 0037-9700. JSTOR 44220248.
- Smallman, David L. (2003). Quincentenary: A Story of St Helena, 1502-2002. Penzance, Cornwall: Patten Press. ISBN 978-1-872229-47-8.
