= Richard Munden =

Richard Munden may refer to:

- Sir Richard Munden (Royal Navy officer) (1640–1680), Royal Navy captain
- Richard Munden (British Army officer) (1680–1725), his son, British Army brigadier-general and Member of Parliament
