= John Munden (disambiguation) =

John Munden was a rear-admiral in the Royal Navy (c.1645–1719).

John Munden may also refer to:

- John Munden, an English Catholic priest executed with George Haydock in 1584
- John Munden, namesake of Munden, Kansas
