= List of ship launches in 1751 =

The list of ship launches in 1751 includes a chronological list of some ships launched in 1751.

Date	Ship	Class	Builder	Location	Country	Notes
30 April	Buckingham	Third rate	John Hollond	Deptford	Great Britain	For Royal Navy.
30 April	Santísima Trinidad	Galleon	Bagatao Shipyards	Sorsogon	(Spain) Spanish East Indies	For Spanish Navy.
1 May	Dolphin	Sixth rate	Earlsman Sparrow	Woolwich Dockyard	Great Britain	For Royal Navy.
22 May	Lion	Lion-class ship of the line	Pierre-Blaise Coulomb	Toulon	Kingdom of France	For French Navy.
June	Formidable	Third rate	Brest	Jacque-Luc Coulomb	Kingdom of France	For French Navy.
10 August	Island	Fourth rate		Copenhagen	Denmark-Norway	For Dano-Norwegian Navy.
10 August	Pilot	Man of war		Copenhagen	Denmark-Norway	For Dano-Norwegian Navy.
21 August	Notre Dame de la Conception	Frigate		Naples	Kingdom of Naples	For Royal Neapolitan Navy.
19 September	St. Chrisostome	Man of war	Sutherland	Saint Petersburg	Russia	For Imperial Russian Navy.
September	Bizarre	Third rate	Jacques-Luc Coulomb	Brest	Kingdom of France	For French Navy.
19 October	Entreprenant	Third rate	Jacques-Luc Coulomb	Brest	Kingdom of France	For French Navy.
20 October	Duc de Bourgogne	Ship of the line	François-Guillaume Clairain des Lauriers	Rochefort	Kingdom of France	For French Navy.
November	Frederickshall	Galley		Copenhagen	Denmark-Norway	For Dano-Norwegian Navy.
November	Frederickstadt	Galley		Copenhagen	Denmark-Norway	For Dano-Norwegian Navy.
29 December	Sage	Lion-class ship of the line	Pierre-Blaise Coulomb	Toulon	Kingdom of France	For French Navy.
Unknown date	Drake	East Indiaman			Great Britain	For private owner.
Unknown date	Indian Queen	Full-rigged ship		Bombay	India	For private owner.
Unknown date	Chevre	Flûte	Chevalier Antoine Groignard	location	Kingdom of France	For French Navy.
Unknown date	Marie	Gabarre		Brest	Kingdom of France	For French Navy.
Unknown date	Amazone	Galley	Jean Reynoir	Brest	Kingdom of France	For French Navy.
Unknown date	Las Caldas	Frigate			Spain	For Spanish Navy.
Unknown date	L'Astrée	Frigate	Gilles Cambry	Lorient	Kingdom of France	For Compagnie des Indes.
Unknown date	Thétis	Topaze-class frigate	Jean-Joseph Ginoux	Brest	Kingdom of France	For French Navy.
Unknown date	Rusé	Rusé-class xebec	Joseph Coubet	Toulon	Kingdom of France	For French Navy.
Unknown date	Serpent	Rusé-class xebec		Toulon	Kingdom of France	For French Navy.
Unknown date	Rochefort	Yacht	François-Guillaume Clairain des Lauriers	Rochefort	Kingdom of France	For French Navy.
Unknown date	Rhinoceros	Flûte	Chevalier Antoine Groignard	Rochefort	Kingdom of France	For French Navy.
Unknown date	Phoenix	Fourth rate		Amsterdam	Dutch Republic	For Dutch Navy.
Unknown date	Stormarn	Fourth rate			Denmark-Norway	For Dano-Norwegian Navy.
Unknown date	Swallow	Brigantine		Lancaster	Great Britain	For Satterthwaite & Inman.
