= John Munden =

Rear-Admiral Sir John Munden
- Portrait by Michael Dahl, 1705
- Born: c. 1645
- Died: 13 March 1719; Chelsea, London
- Relatives: Sir Richard Munden (brother)
- Military career
- Allegiance: England
- Branch: Royal Navy
- Rank: Rear admiral
- Commands: Edgar; Coronation; Lenox; St Michael; Monmouth; Albemarle; London; Ranelagh; Winchester
- Conflicts: Battle of Beachy Head; Battle of Barfleur

Rear-Admiral Sir John Munden (c. 1645 – 13 March 1719) was a Royal Navy officer who was dismissed from the service for having failed to engage a French fleet, despite having been acquitted by a court-martial of any misconduct in the matter.

== Early life and career ==
He was born around 1645, the younger son of Richard Munden (1602–1672), a ferryman of Chelsea, and his wife Elizabeth (1608–1694). He was appointed second lieutenant aboard the St David on 30 November 1677, and served aboard her in the Mediterranean until 1680, under the command of his older brother Sir Richard Munden. Afterwards, he transferred on the Constant Warwick on 16 July 1681, the Mary Rose on 17 June 1685, and the Charles Galley on 31 July 1686. On 23 July 1688 he was made commander of the Half Moon fire ship.

== Captain ==
He achieved post rank on 14 December 1688, when Lord Dartmouth gave him command of the Edgar. At the battle of Beachy Head he commanded the Coronation. He fought at the battle of Barfleur on 19 May 1692, commanding the Lenox in the van of the red squadron, under the immediate orders of Sir Ralph Delaval. He was appointed to command the St Michael in 1693, the Monmouth in 1695, the Albemarle in 1696, and the London in 1697. In May 1699 he was given command of the Ranelagh, only to be moved to the Winchester two months later and sent to the Mediterranean in command of a small squadron. Here, he negotiated a treaty with the dey of Algiers for the regulation of ships' passes, and obtained the release of English slaves. He returned to England in November 1700.

== Admiral ==
His service in the Mediterranean brought him to the notice and favour of King William III, and led to his promotion to rear admiral of the blue on 14 April 1701. On 30 June he was further promoted to rear admiral of the white, and given command of a squadron charged with escorting the king to Holland. On the following day he was knighted by the king on board the yacht William and Mary, "under the standard of England".

Early in the reign of Queen Anne, in April 1702, it was learned that the French were planning to send a convoy from Corunna to the West Indies and Mexico, carrying the Duke of Alburquerque and a number of troops. Munden, by then rear admiral of the red, was chosen to intercept this force with a flotilla comprising eight third-rates, one fourth-rate and three smaller craft. Munden sailed from St. Helens on 10 May 1702, and arrived off the coast of Galicia five days later. Learning soon after of the expected approach of thirteen French men-of-war from La Rochelle, he positioned his fleet to intercept and sighted them off Cape Ortegal on 28 May. He gave chase, but they were able to enter Corunna before he could catch them. Munden called a council at war at which it was decided that the harbour was too well defended to be assaulted. Consequently, having cruised the area until running short of provisions, the British fleet headed home on 20 June, with nothing to show for the expedition but two captured merchantmen from Martinique.

== Dismissal from service ==
The failure of the expedition caused a public outcry, and, on 13 July, Munden was tried by a court-martial aboard the Queen at Spithead on a charge of negligence. In his defence, he wrote:

It is an easy matter for any standers-by to say, after a design has miscarried, that, if you had been on this place instead of that, you had infallibly succeeded ... But if it be considered that the sea is a wide place, and that we did not miss the enemy above an hour and a half's time, I hope my enemies will be persuaded to have another opinion of me.

The court-martial, presided over by Sir Cloudesley Shovel, agreed and Munden was acquitted of all counts. He re-hoisted his flag on HMS Victory (1695) on 21 July.

However, public opinion demanded a sacrifice, and Munden was chosen as a scapegoat. In what John Knox Laughton describes as "a singular and harsh exercise of the prerogative," he was "discharged from his post and command in the royal navy" on 10 August 1702. This decision was justified in the Annals of Queen Anne thus:

For though Sir John behaved himself worthily on all other occasions, and even acted to the best of his knowledge on this, yet the least appearance of misconduct deserves censure in the beginning of a new reign; for a vigorous inflicting of punishments contributes no less to the establishment of a throne than an equal and generous dispensation of rewards.

He retired to Chelsea, where he was described as "a very plain man in his conversation and dress, of a fair complexion." He died there on 13 March 1719, unmarried and without issue. His estate was split between three nephews, including Brigadier Richard Munden, and five nieces.
