= HMS Swallow Prize =

Two ships of the Royal Navy have been named HMS Swallow Prize:

- HMS Swallow Prize (1692) was a French 18-gun sixth rate, captured in 1692. She was recaptured in 1696 by a French privateer off Weymouth.
- HMS Swallow Prize (1704) was a French 32-gun fifth rate, captured in March 1704 by HMS Swallow. She was wrecked on 17 November 1711 off Corsica.

== See also ==
- HMS Swallow
