= De Zwaluw =

De Zwaluw (English: The swallow) is a name given to some windmills in the Netherlands:

- De Zwaluw, Burdaard, in Friesland.
- De Zwaluw, Hasselt, in Overijssel
- De Zwaluw, Hazerswoude-Dorp in South Holland
- De Zwaluw, Hoogeveen, in Drenthe
- De Zwaluw, Kesteren, in Gelderland
- De Zwaluw, Nieuwe-Pekela, in Groningen
- De Zwaluw, Oss, in North Brabant
- De Zwaluw, Oudemolen, in Drenthe
- De Zwaluw, Zuurdijk, in Groningen
- De Zwaluw, former name of Zeldenrust, Oss
