= Swallow (surname) =

Swallow is a surname. Notable people with the surname include:

== Sport ==
- Andrew Swallow (born 1987), Australian rules footballer with North Melbourne
- Andy Swallow (1904–1969), Scottish footballer with St Johnstone, Millwall (born Kregsdis, corruption of kregždė, Lithuanian for Swallow)
- Barry Swallow (born 1942), English footballer with Doncaster, Barnsley, Bradford City, York
- Ben Swallow (born 1989), British footballer
- Bill Swallow (born c. 1944), British motorcyclist
- Chris Swallow (born 1981), British cricketer
- David Swallow (born 1992), Australian rules footballer with Gold Coast Suns, brother of Andrew
- Ian Swallow (born 1962), English cricketer with Yorkshire, Somerset
- James Swallow (cricketer) (1878–1916), South African cricketer
- Jerod Swallow (born 1966), American figure skater
- Jodie Swallow (born 1981), British triathlete
- Ray Swallow (born 1935), English cricketer with Derbyshire and footballer with Arsenal, Derby County

== Politics ==
- Arthur Percy Swallow (1893–1985), Canadian politician
- George N. Swallow (1854–1931), American politician
- Gregory Swallow (fl. from 1981), American politician
- John Swallow (born 1962), American politician
- Peter Swallow (born 1993), British politician, MP for Bracknell
- Silas C. Swallow (1839–1930), American preacher and politician

== Other ==
- Alan Swallow (1915–1966), English professor who ran his own publishing company
- Deborah Swallow (born 1948), British art historian
- Ellen Swallow Richards née Ellen Swallow (1842–1911), American chemist
- Emily Swallow (born 1979), American actress
- James Swallow (fl. from 1998), British writer
- John C. Swallow (born 1923), English oceanographer
- Neil Swallow (1931–2010), British dentist and academic
- Patricia Swallow (born c. 1932), British naval commandant
- Rachel Swallow (fl. from 2015), archaeologist and castellologist
- Ricky Swallow (born 1974), Australian sculptor
- Roger Swallow (born 1946), British music producer
- Steve Swallow (born 1940), American jazz bassist and composer
