= William Barrett (consul) =

English consul

William Barrett (died 1584) was English consul at Aleppo. He was there when John Eldred and his companion, William Shales, arrived there on 11 June 1584; he died eight days after their arrival, as is recorded in Eldred's narrative.

== Works ==
He wrote a treatise on The Money and Measures of Babylon, Balsara, and the Indies, with the Customes, &c., which occupies pp. 406 to 416 of the second volume of Richard Hakluyt's Collection of Voyages, folio edition, 1810. A paragraph records the discovery of the island of Saint Helena, and its use as a provision depôt for the 'Portugale' traders with India.

(By Balsara he was referring to the modern-day Basra in Iraq.)
