= HMS Swallow (1918) =

Destroyer of the Royal Navy

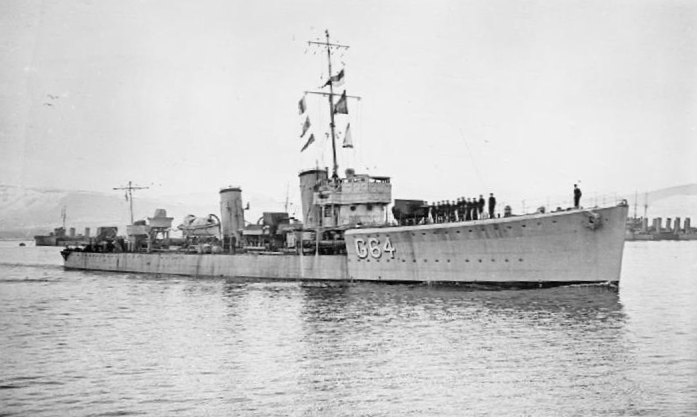
- Sister ship HMS Strenuous in 1918

History

United Kingdom
- Name: HMS Swallow
- Namesake: Swallow
- Ordered: 7 April 1917
- Builder: Scotts, Greenock
- Yard number: 491
- Launched: 1 August 1918
- Completed: 27 September 1918
- Out of service: 24 September 1936
- Fate: Broken up

General characteristics
- Class & type: S-class destroyer
- Displacement: 1,075 long tons (1,092 t) normal; 1,221 long tons (1,241 t) deep load
- Length: 265 ft (80.8 m) p.p.
- Beam: 26 ft 8 in (8.13 m)
- Draught: 9 ft 10 in (3.00 m) mean
- Propulsion: 3 Yarrow boilers; 2 geared Brown-Curtis steam turbines, 27,000 shp
- Speed: 36 knots (41.4 mph; 66.7 km/h)
- Range: 2,750 nmi (5,090 km) at 15 kn (28 km/h)
- Complement: 90
- Armament: 3 × QF 4-inch (101.6 mm) Mark IV guns, mounting P Mk. IX; 1 × single 2-pounder (40-mm) "pom-pom" Mk. II anti-aircraft gun; 4 × 21 in (533 mm) torpedo tubes (2×2)

HMS Swallow was an S-class destroyer, which served with the Royal Navy. The S class were a cheaper and faster alternative to the larger V and W class most recently procured by the service. Launched on 1 August 1918, Swallow took part in one of the final acts of the Harwich Force on 1 October as part of a flotilla that unsuccessfully tried to intercept the retreating German troops. After the armistice, Swallow was transferred to the Mediterranean fleet and served in the Black Sea covering the evacuation of demobilised forces from Batumi and Marmara Ereğlisi. Returning to the United Kingdom in 1923, the vessel was placed in reserve until 1936. On 24 September in that year, after just under eighteen years in service, Swallow was one of the destroyers exchanged for RMS Majestic and subsequently broken up at Inverkeithing.

== Design ==
Swallow was one of twenty-four Admiralty S class destroyers ordered by the British Admiralty on 9 April 1917 as part of the Eleventh War Construction Programme. The design was a development of the R class introduced as a cheaper and faster alternative to the V and W class. Differences with the R class were minor, such as having the searchlight moved aft.

Swallow had a overall length of 276 ft (84 m) and a length of 265 ft (81 m) between perpendiculars. Beam was 26 ft 8 in (8.13 m) and draught 9 ft 10 in (3.00 m). Displacement was 1,075 long tons (1,092 t) normal and 1,221 long tons (1,241 t) deep load. Three Yarrow boilers fed steam to two sets of Brown-Curtis geared steam turbines rated at 27,000 shaft horsepower (20,000 kW) and driving two shafts, giving a design speed of 36 knots (67 km/h; 41 mph) at normal loading and 32.5 knots (60.2 km/h; 37.4 mph) at deep load. Two funnels were fitted. The vessel normally carried 301 long tons (306 t) of fuel oil, giving a design range of 2,750 nautical miles (5,090 km; 3,160 mi) at 15 knots (28 km/h; 17 mph).

Armament consisted of three QF 4-inch (102 mm) Mk IV guns on the ship's centreline. One was mounted raised on the forecastle, one between the funnels on a platform and one aft. The ship also mounted a single 2-pounder (40 mm) pom-pom anti-aircraft gun for air defence. Four 21-inch (533 mm) torpedo tubes were fitted in two twin rotating mounts aft. The ship was designed to mount two 18-inch (457 mm) tubes either side of the superstructure but this addition required the forecastle plating to be cut away, making the vessel very wet so they were removed. The weight saved enabled the heavier Mark V 21-inch torpedo to be carried. The ship's complement was 90 officers and ratings.

== Construction and career ==
Laid down in September 1917 by Scotts in Greenock with the yard number 491, Swallow was launched on 9 November 1918. The vessel was the thirty-seventh of the name. Completed on 27 September 1918, the ship joined the Tenth Destroyer Flotilla of the Harwich Force. Shortly after entering service, on 1 October, the ship took part in a flotilla led by the destroyer leader Montrose that sailed to intercept retreating German forces, but did not find any. This was one of the final voyages undertaken by the Harwich Force during the war.

After the armistice, Swallow was recommissioned on 17 February 1919 into the Sixth Destroyer Flotilla as part of the new Mediterranean fleet. The ship then transversed the Bosporus into the Black Sea to Batumi, staying until 9 July to cover the evacuation of troops to Russia. From there, the destroyer sailed to Bandırma in what is now Turkey on 19 July along with the dreadnought battleship Revenge. The two ships then continued to Marmara Ereğlisi to supervise the movement of the demobilised troops. At the conclusion of this service, on 4 December 1923, the destroyer was transferred to Chatham and, on 29 January 1926 placed in the Reserve Fleet.

On 22 April 1930, the London Naval Treaty was signed, which limited total destroyer tonnage in the Navy. The navy was looking to introduce more modern destroyers and so needed to retire some of the older vessels. Swallow remained in service until 24 September 1936 when the ship was given to Thos. W. Ward of Sheffield as one of a number given in exchange for the liner Majestic. The destroyer was subsequently broken up at Inverkeithing.

== Pennant numbers ==
Pennant number	Date
F73	November 1918
