= Swallow (Royal Navy tender) =

At least two vessels named Swallow served the British Royal Navy as a ship's tender. These vessels were never commissioned and so technically do not qualify for the prefix "HMS".

- Swallow was a tender in service between 1793 and 1795. While he was at Smyrna, Sir Sidney Smith observed that there were a number of British sailors at loose ends. He acquainted them of the existence of a state of war between Britain and France, and asked them if they would be willing to serve. He was able to recruit 40 so he purchased a lateen-rigged vessel 40 ft (12.2 m) long at the keel. He then sailed her to Toulon, where he put her under the command of Admiral Hood. (Hood was the Navy's commander-in-chief in the Mediterranean, then engaged in blockading Toulon.) Swallow was among the British warships that shared in the capture, on 24 May 1793, of the French brigs Jacobin and Natine. On the night of 18 December, Smith was at Toulon and took Swallow, which was under the command of Lieutenant Hill, and three British and three Spanish gunboats to burn the French vessels and stores at the Arsenal as the English and Spanish forces were withdrawing, terminating their unsuccessful Siege of Toulon. Swallow's primary role was to aim her guns at some 600 galley-slaves who were not in chains and showed signs of leaving their galleys to intervene and interfere with the British operations. Smith singled out four of Swallow's crew for their role in preparing the combustibles for the operation.
- Swallow was a cutter of 46 tons (bm) launched in 1811 at Deptford. She was 46 ft (14 m) long overall, and had a breath of 16 ft (4.9 m). She sailed on 15 April 1820 from Portsmouth for Barbados and Jamaica, in company with HMS Tamar. Swallow foundered on 30 November 1825 while acting as a tender to HMS Eden. At the time Eden was at Port Royal, Jamaica.

== See also ==
- HMS Swallow
