= Richard Munden (Royal Navy officer) =

Naval officer (1640–1680)

Sir Richard Munden (1640–1680) was a Commodore in the Royal Navy. He was the elder son of Sir Richard Munden (1602–1672) of Chelsea; the younger son was Rear-Admiral Sir John Munden.

Richard first appears as commander of the Swallow ketch in 1666, and afterwards of the Portsmouth in 1667. In 1672 he was captain of the Princess of 52 guns; and in 1673, in the Assistance, was commodore of a small squadron sent as convoy to the East India fleet. On 8 February 1673 he surprised a Dutch squadron of three ships under the command of Cornelis Evertsen the Youngest in the bay of Sao Tiago, who were revictualling there in the course of the Dutch Raid on North America. Ironically, the Dutch had the objective of capturing the homeward-bound EIC fleet that Munden intended to protect. As Munden had the larger number of ships, the Dutch fled while slipping their anchors. Munden was unable to catch them, but retrieved the Dutch anchors, before departing for St. Helena. Touching at St Helena for water, he found the island in the possession of the Dutch. After a spirited attack by sea and land he recaptured it on 4 May, and three Dutch East Indiamen, richly laden, who anchored in the bay, were seized. With his squadron and prizes and the homeward-bound ships in convoy, Munden arrived in England in August, and on 6 December was knighted by the king, "in consideration of his eminent service". In April 1677, in command of the St David, he convoyed the trade to the Mediterranean, was for some time at Zante, afterwards at Scanderoon, and for fourteen months at Smyrna. He arrived at Plymouth with the homeward trade on 12 May 1680. On 15 June he wrote to the admiralty explaining that he had not sent home the muster-books from the Mediterranean, the postage being extremely heavy, and by no means safe. Ten days later, 25 June 1680, he died. He was buried in the church at Bromley, Middlesex.

Munden married Susan Gore, by whom he had five daughters and one son, Richard, born posthumously. Shortly after his death arms were granted to the widow, her children, and her husband's brother, Sir John Munden.

== Sources ==
- This article incorporates text from a publication now in the public domain: Laughton, John Knox (1894). "Munden, Richard". In Lee, Sidney (ed.). Dictionary of National Biography. Vol. 39. London: Smith, Elder & Co.
- Shomette, Donald G.; Haslach, Robert D. (1988). Raid on America: The Dutch Naval campaign of 1672-1674. University of South Carolina Press. ISBN 978-0788422454.
