= De Zwaluw, Hasselt =

Windmill in Hasselt, Netherlands

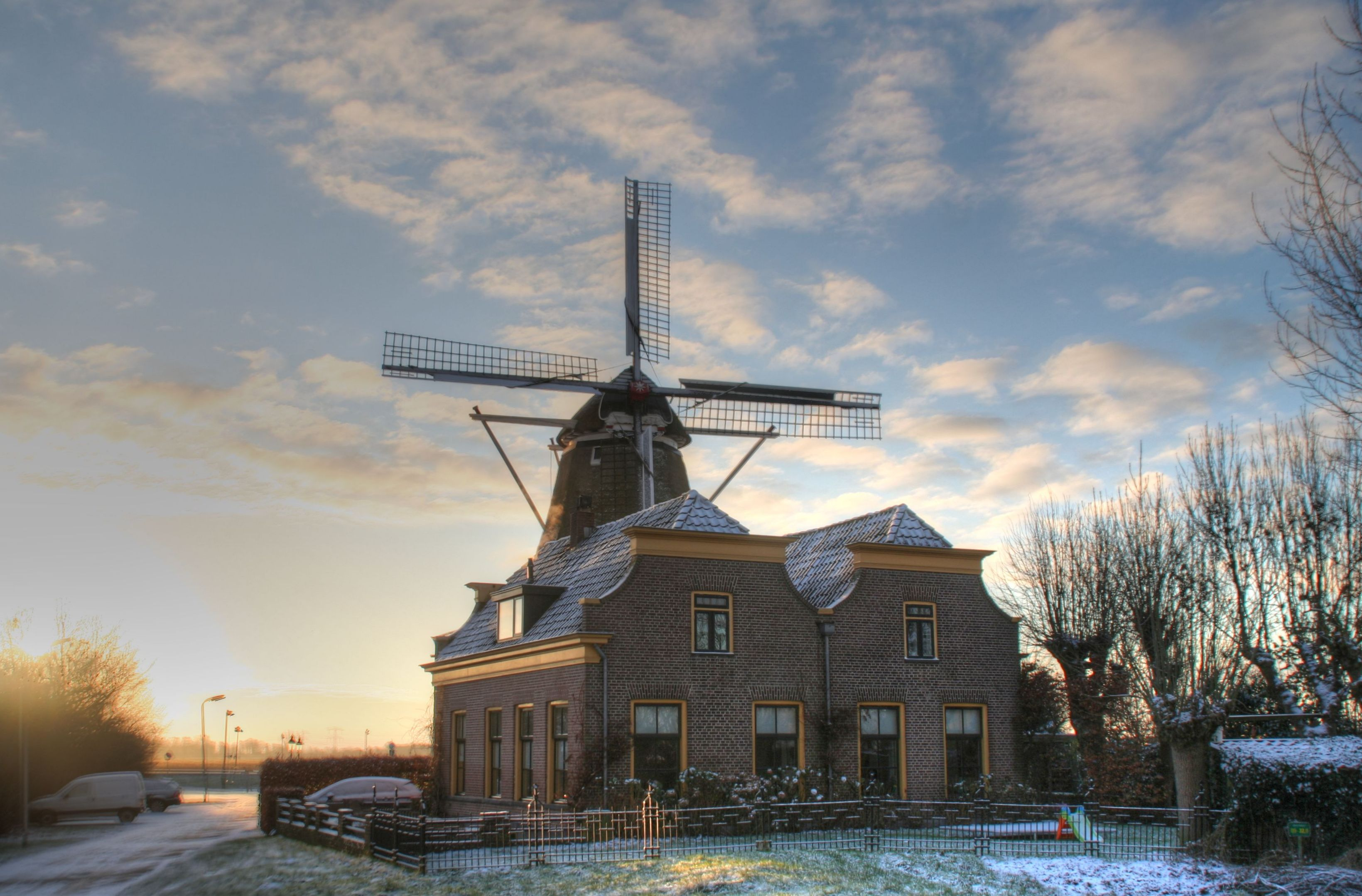
- De Zwaluw,
- Interactive map of De Zwaluw, Hasselt

Origin
- Mill name: De Zwaluw
- Mill location: Stenendijk 7, 8061 HP Hasselt
- Coordinates: 52°35′13.3″N 6°5′49.05″E
- Operator: Stichting tot Behoud van Korenmolen De Zwaluw te Hasselt
- Year built: 1784; 242 years ago, 1857; 169 years ago

Information
- Purpose: Corn mill
- Type: Smock mill
- Storeys: Two-storey smock
- Base storeys: Five-storey base
- Smock sides: Eight sides
- No. of sails: Four sails
- Type of sails: Patent sails
- Windshaft: Cast iron
- Winding: Tailpole and winch
- No. of pairs of millstones: one pair

De Zwaluw (English: The Swallow) is a smock mill in Hasselt, Overijssel, Netherlands which is run by volunteers every Saturday. The mill was built in 1784 just outside the city walls of Hasselt.
