= HMS Swallow (1661) =

History

England
- Name: Swallow
- Acquired: 1661
- Fate: Sold in May 1674

General characteristics as built
- Class & type: 6-gun Unrated Ketch
- Tons burthen: 56
- Length: 40 ft 0 in (12.19 m) (keel)
- Beam: 16 ft 0 in (4.88 m)
- Depth of hold: 8 ft 0 in (2.44 m)
- Propulsion: Sails
- Sail plan: Ketch
- Complement: 40 in 1661
- Armament: 6 × 4-pounder guns

Swallow was a 6-gun unrated Ketch which served in the English Royal Navy, bought in 1661. The term "Ketch" refers to a two-masted sailboat whose mainmast is taller than the mizzen mast (or aft-mast), generally in a 40-foot or bigger boat.

== Service history ==
When bought in 1661, Swallow was valued as £355.9.0d and was commissioned 18/5/1661 under Captain Francis Sparrow until 8/12/1662; in the Mediterranean 1662.

On 5/2/1664 under Capt. Robert Ensome until 16/8/1665; to Jamaica 1665.

On 17.10.1665 under Capt. John Berry until 6.2.1666, during this time, on 8/12/1665, Sparrow took 3 prizes into Dover, laden with wine and brandy, and on 9/12/1665 Sparrow took 2 prizes into Deal, A fly-boat about 100 tons and a Hoy, both out of Bordeaux.

On 10.2.1666 under Capt. John Phenny until 17.8.1666, then on 19.8.1666 under Capt. Sir Richard Munden until 22.7.1667.

Then on 28.4.1668 under Capt. Benjamin Symonds until 21.7.1668, it was eventually sold in May 1674.
