= Military reserve forces of Saint Helena =

The island of Saint Helena, currently part of the British Overseas Territory of Saint Helena, Ascension and Tristan da Cunha, maintained a military reserve force at various times between the 17th and 20th centuries. The first force, a feudal militia, was established in 1673 by the East India Company, who had first settled the island, in response to a Dutch invasion and short-lived occupation. The East India Company divided the island into tenancies with each required to provide a certain number of men for the militia. This fell into disuse as the defences of the island were improved. Saint Helena was taken over by the British Crown in 1833 and, keen to reduce the regular garrison, the militia was reinvigorated. An ordinance was passed drafting every able-bodied man into the Local Militia, though this was soon reduced to a core of around 360 men. This militia must have fallen into disuse by the later part of the 19th century as a new force, the St Helena Volunteer Sharpshooters, was established in 1897. Numbering around 100 men sources conflict on whether it was maintained beyond the withdrawal of the regular British garrison in 1907. It had certainly been disbanded by 1998.

In addition to local forces three regiments, of men recruited elsewhere, were formed specifically for garrison duty on the island. The East India Company's St Helena Artillery Regiment and St Helena Infantry Regiment served until 1833 and the British Army's St Helena Regiment was raised in 1842 and disbanded in 1865. Outside of these periods, the garrison was provided by a rotating force posted from different regiments. Currently, the island has no military and defence is the responsibility of the United Kingdom.

== Feudal militia ==
Robert Brooke

A settlement on the island of Saint Helena had been established in 1659 by East India Company troops sent by Oliver Cromwell, who foresaw the need for a watering stop on the long passage to India. The island was captured by a Dutch expedition in January 1673 and recaptured by a British force under Richard Munden in May. To improve the defences of the island it was decided that a militia would be raised from the settlers and a Royal Charter was approved later that year to provide a legal basis. The island became a feudal manor, divided into tenancies with each required to provide a number of soldiers for a militia. Many tenants paid a quit rent to commute their obligation (and some continued to do so until at least 1947). The East India Company provided officers for the unit and it was commanded by a member of the Island Council.

The East India Company later established two regular units to help defend the island, the St Helena Artillery and St Helena Infantry Regiments, drawn from non-local recruits. As the East India Company garrison grew and more fortifications were constructed the militia declined in importance, by the early 1790s the militia numbered just 30-40 men. In 1796 the island's governor Robert Brooke enlarged the militia; he raised two companies from the black residents of the island and two companies of white men, largely by inducing soldiers of the regular East India Company garrison to settle on the island at the end of their service. Service in the militia was made compulsory for all male residents in 1804, but this order was soon rescinded. The militia assisted the governor in putting down the 1811 "Spirits Rebellion" by members of the regular garrison. By the early 1800s the militia wore rifle-style uniforms but carried muskets.

== Local Militia ==
In 1833 the British crown took over governance of the island. The regular East India Company regiments were disbanded and a British Army garrison was posted. Eager to reduce the expense of the garrison the British reinvigorated the militia. New ordinances were passed on 29 May 1837 enrolling all able-bodied men between 15 and 50 into the "Corps of Local Militia". The Local Militia were reduced to a core of 360 men by an ordinance of 19 March 1838: 21 officers, 19 sergeants, 18 corporals, 4 drummers and 300 privates. These were chosen from the pool of men enlisted by the previous ordinance, the remaining men acting as a supplementary reserve. The militia were issued with new uniforms patterned after those worn by the contemporary Rifle Brigade. Members of the militia were required to attend six drills a year at Francis Plain and to respond to call-outs in times of emergency. The men were drawn from both the black and white population of the island, which numbered around 5,000 split roughly equally between the races in 1833.

The militia paraded for the 15 October 1840 procession carrying the disinterred remains of Napoleon to the French frigate Belle Poule for reburial in France. The militia led the procession, ahead of the 91st Regiment of Foot, and afterwards lined the streets of Jamestown with arms reversed. The militia band played for the occasion. On 8 June 1846 the age of liability for service in the militia was raised to 55 and on 14 December 1857 the corps became subject to the Mutiny Act. Between 1842 and 1865 the British Army maintained a St Helena Regiment that provided a permanent regular garrison, but the island was otherwise defenced by a rotating garrison of regular regiments.

== St Helena Volunteer Sharpshooters ==
The Local Militia must have fallen into disuse by the later 19th century as the British government, again keen to reduce the regular garrison, made several attempts to reinstate a militia force on the island from 1889. It experienced difficulty as many able-bodied male residents had gone to South Africa to work in gold mining. A new reserve unit, the St Helena Volunteer Sharpshooters, was established in 1897. The unit had an approved establishment of 3 officers and 100 men. The members of the unit wore a khaki uniform with a felt hat and were required to fire 70 rifle rounds in practice each year. Although they were classed as a rifle unit unlike their equivalents in the British Army the St Helena Volunteer Sharpshooters carried colours. According to a Colonial Defence Committee defence plan of 1895-1905 the St Helena Volunteer Sharpshooters would work in conjunction with a unit of the Royal Garrison Artillery (equipped with maxim guns) and a unit of regular infantry from the garrison to dislodge any beachhead established by an enemy force on the island. Despite the early recruitment problems the unit was at near-full strength in 1905, numbering 4 officers (one was supernumerary) and 93 men.

The later history of the St Helena Volunteer Sharpshooters is unclear. David L. Smallman, writing in 2003 states that the unit was disbanded in 1907, when the last British regular garrison was withdrawn; however a governors order exists from 1918 which altered the unit's name to the St Helena Rifles and G. C. Kitching, writing in 1947, states that the unit remained in existence. It is known that the island had no reserve military force by 1998. Currently Saint Helena, part of the British Overseas Territory of Saint Helena, Ascension and Tristan da Cunha, has no military and defence is the responsibility of the United Kingdom.
