= Swallow (1798 ship) =

History

Great Britain
- Name: Swallow
- Namesake: Swallow
- In service: 1798
- Captured: 1799

General characteristics
- Tons burthen: 207 (bm)
- Complement: 25, or 37
- Armament: 14 × 6&9-pounder guns

Swallow's origins are obscure in terms of her launch year and place. She first appeared in 1798 as a slave ship in the triangular trade in enslaved people. She first appeared in Lloyd's Register (LR) in 1798 with R.White as master, R.Abram as owner, and trade Liverpool–Africa.

Captain Robert White acquired a letter of marque on 14 March 1798. He sailed from Liverpool on 4 May. In 1798, 160 vessels sailed from English ports, bound for the trade in enslaved people; 149 of these vessels sailed from Liverpool.

Swallow acquired captives in West Africa. She escaped the French privateer Republican, of 32 guns, in a squall after an hour-long running fight. After Swallow had acquired her captives she sailed towards the West Indies. On her way she captured a French privateer. However, the privateer's crew were able seize their captors. They then sailed Swallow and the privateer into Cayenne.
