= Swallow (1751 brigantine) =

British sailing vessel

History

Great Britain
- Name: Swallow
- Owner: Thomas Satterthwaite & Charles Inman
- Launched: 1751
- Acquired: 1751

Swallow was a brigantine built in Lancaster, Lancashire for Satterthwaite & Inman for use in the slave trade.

In 1754 the ship sailed for Gambia whence she embarked 98 enslaved Africans, 21 of whom died in transit before 77 were sold in Barbados.

The ship was advertised for sale on 27 August 1756, in Lancaster, enquiries directed Satterthwaite and Inman. According to Gross Fleury's Journal in an account of ships sailing from Lancaster, the Swallow is listed as belonging to Thompson and Co. with Ord as the master.
