= HMS St David (1667) =

Ship of the line of the Royal Navy

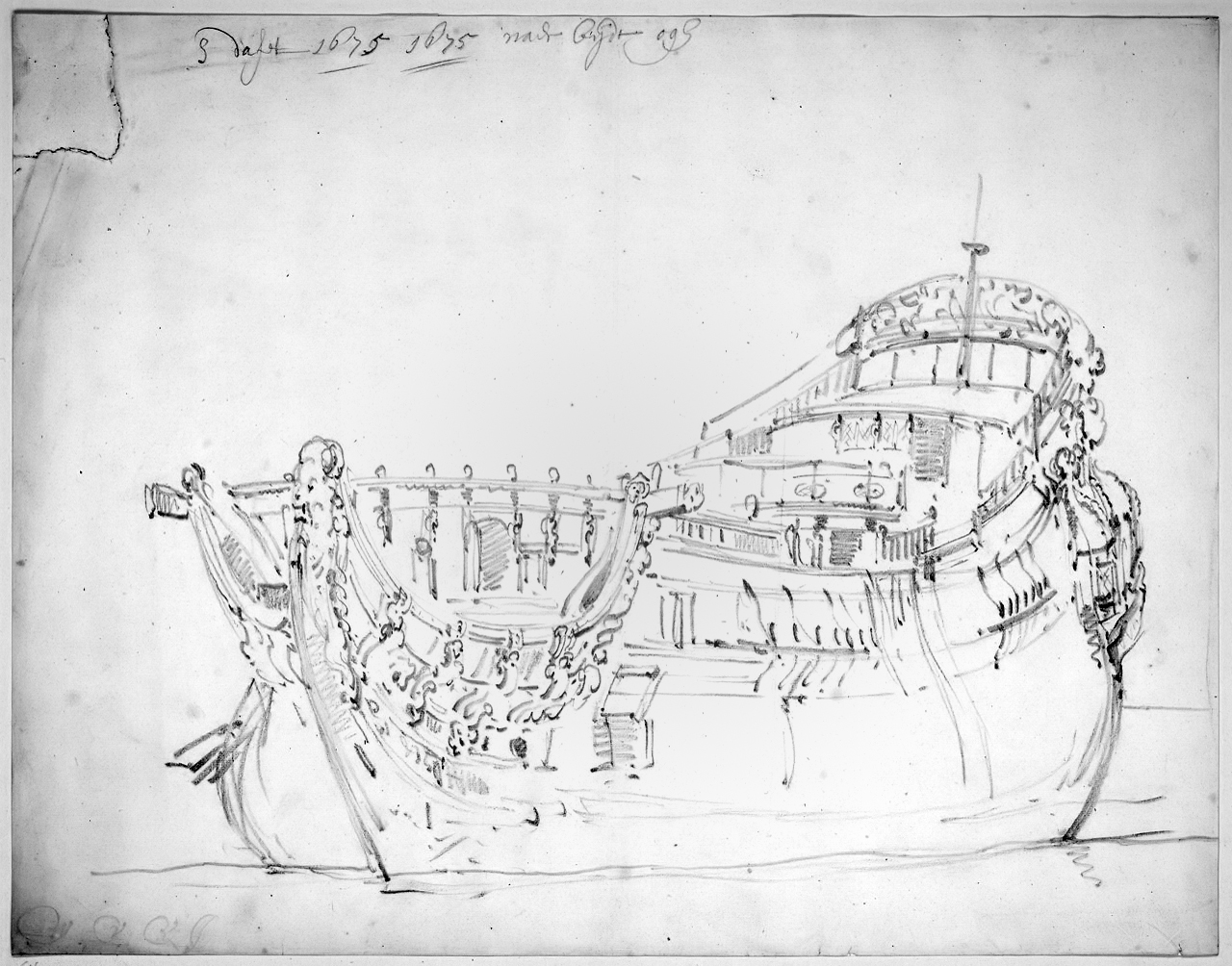
- ‘St David’, 54-gun fourth-rate, built 1667, sunk 1689. Only the foremost gun deck port is shown. (Willem van de Velde, 1675)

History

England
- Name: HMS St David
- Builder: Furzer, Lydney
- Launched: 1667
- Fate: Wrecked, 11th Nov. 1689

General characteristics
- Class & type: 54-gun fourth rate ship of the line
- Tons burthen: 685 tons
- Length: 107 ft (33 m) (keel)
- Beam: 34 ft 9 in (10.59 m)
- Depth of hold: 14 ft 8 in (4.47 m)
- Propulsion: Sails
- Sail plan: Full-rigged ship
- Armament: 54 guns of various weights of shot

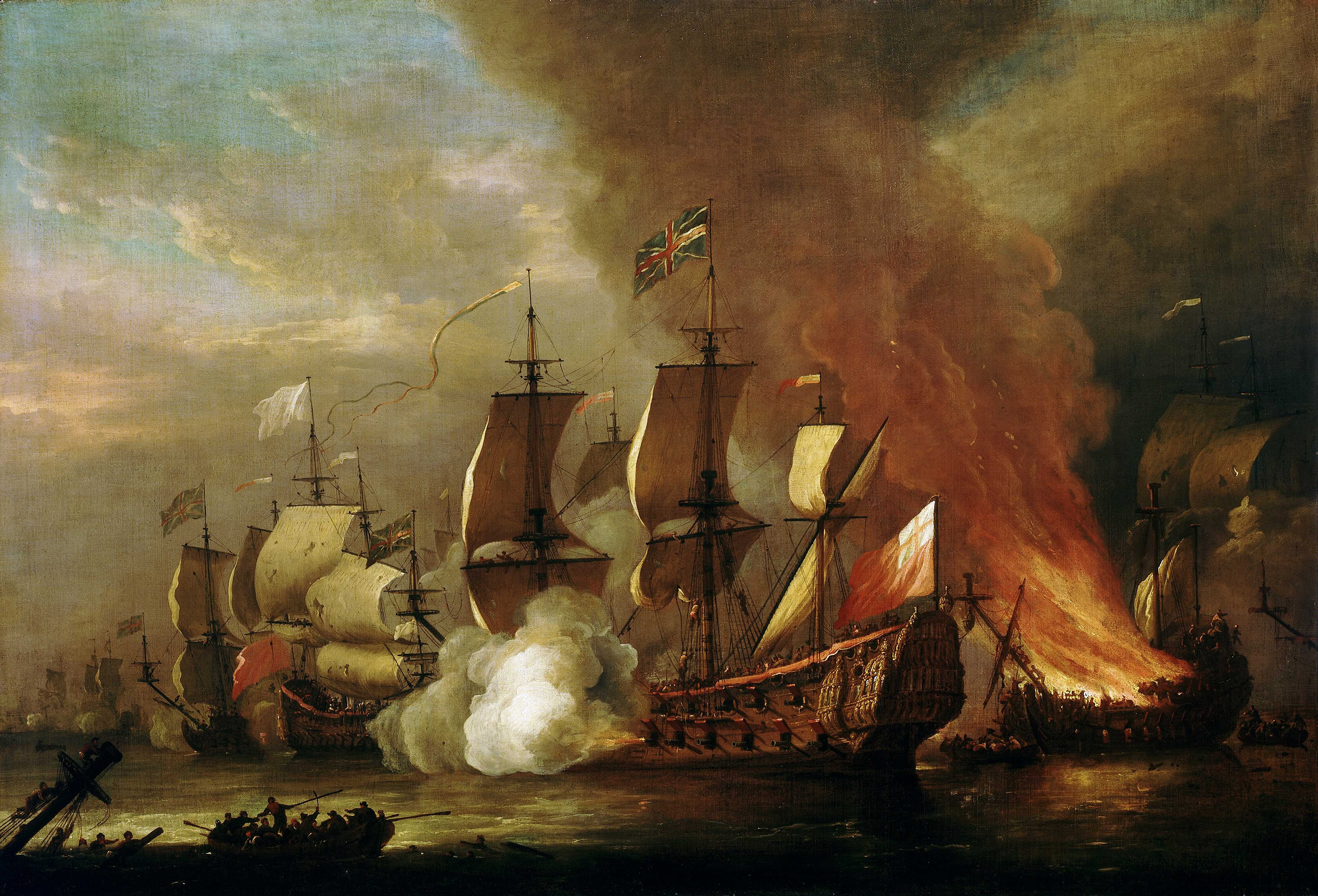
St David at what is possibly the Battle of Bantry Bay

HMS St David was a 54-gun fourth rate ship of the line of the English Royal Navy, launched in 1667 at Lydney.

She foundered in Portsmouth Harbour in 1689 and was raised in 1691 under the supervision of Edmund Dummer, Surveyor of the Navy.

The ship was later hulked and finally sold in 1713.

This is the ship about whose voyage John Baltharpe wrote “The Straights Voyage, or, St. Davids Poem”. while this may not be the most literary effort, it is very engaging and, being written by one of the crew, as opposed to an officer is rollicking, earthy, and illustrative of the lives of working seamen, John Baltharpe had been enslaved by the north Africans previously, and so was well up for a scrap with the Algerians, which was the voyage the poem illustrates
