= HM Revenue Cutter Swallow =

Several cutters have served His Britannic Majesty's revenue service as HM Revenue Cutter Swallow in the late 18th and early 19th centuries. In wartime each cutter operated under a letter of marque, which authorized the master to engage in offensive actions against the enemy, not just defensive. These letters provide some information. Unfortunately, because the government did not insure its vessels, sources such as Lloyd's Register, and later, the Register of Shipping, did not list the vessels while they were on government service. Also, Revenue cutters worked with the Royal Navy. A Customs House minute of 7 July 1806 notes that the Revenue cutters Swan and Hound might replace the Revenue cutters Stag and Swallow, which were then serving with Admiral Keith. Individual cutters might even for a time serve the Navy as a hired armed vessel.

All tonnages in this article are burthens (bm). They are clearly approximate as they vary widely for the same vessel.

== 1784–1792 ==
The cutter Swallow, of 24 men, was stationed at Hull and on the establishment of the Customs Board.

In 1788, the captain of the Revenue cutter Swallow boarded two Swedish ships, Aurora and Maria, then in dock in Kingston-on-Hull and seized them. The two Swedish ships had been engaged in the illegal export of wool.

In 1789, Mr. Thomas Amos was master of the Revenue cutter Swallow. She had been stationed at Cowes to replace the Revenue cutter Swan, which was at Lonodon.

On 23 June 1791, The Times reported that the Revenue cutter Swallow had brought into Penzance a seizure of tea, tobacco, and 700 gallons of spirits.

== 1793–1815 ==
=== Letters of marque ===
The table below shows letters of marque issued to a Swallow where there is reason to suppose that she was a revenue cutter.

Letter of Marque	Type	Master	Tons (bm)	Armament	Complement
1793, February 25	N/A	Thomas Amos	189	16 × 9-pounder guns	32
1794, July 5	Cutter	Thomas Amos	131	10 × 4-pounder guns	32
1795, October 30	Cutter	Thomas Amos	131	10 × 4-pounder guns	32
1803, June 9	Cutter	Thomas Amos	131	10 × 4-pounder guns	32
1806, June 6	Cutter	Thomas Amos	153	14 × 12&9-pounder guns	32
1812, April 27	Cutter	William Blake	153	14 × 6-pounder guns	45

=== Mentions ===
On 27 April 1793, HMS Alarm captured the French privateer Chauvelin. That same day, the Revenue cutter Swallow, which was in company with Alarm, captured the privateer Enfant de la Patrie. Both privateers had 10 guns; Chauvelin had 54 men and Enfant had 28.

On 23 November 1793, a smuggling cutter was observed off the coast near Shoreham, Sussex. Crew from Swallow manned her galley and rowed toward the smuggler. As they came alongside, the smugglers fired small arms and a carriage gun loaded with lead at the Custom's men, wounding one mortally. The Commissioners of His Majesty's Customs offered a reward of £300 for information leading to the delivery and apprehension of the master of the smuggling cutter, and the person who fired the shot.

In April 1794, the revenue cutters Swallow and Swan captured off Brighton a smuggling lugger with 366 casks of spirits, 31 bags of snuff, and two bags of tobacco. The next day they captured another lugger, this one with tea and 400 casks of spirits.

At some point the Revenue cutters Stag and Swallow captured the Einigheit, of Lubeck for which they were awarded prize money.

The Times reported that the Revenue cutter Swallow, Captain Smith, had captured a smuggling ship off the Sussex coast. The smuggler was carrying more than 5000 gallons of brandy and geneva and resisted arrest. One smuggler was killed and two wounded; Swallow had three men wounded.

On 16 August 1796, the hired armed cutter Lion and the Revenue cutter Swallow were four leagues WSW of Beachy Head when they observed a signal from the signal post alerting them to the presence of an enemy vessel. They set out in pursuit and captured a privateer lugger and her prize, a sloop. The privateer was armed with swivel guns and small arms and had a crew of 17 men. She was three days out of St Valory and had only captured the sloop.

HM Revenue Cutter Swallow, Mr. Amos, master, captured the French privateer Petit Diable, of six tons (bm), off Farleigh on 27 August 1796. Petit Diable had a crew of 14. (Note: Petit Diable was a privateer that had been commissioned in Dunkirk in 1795 under the American captain William Ripner, with 44 men and 8 guns.) Swallow brought her into Rye. One source state that Petit Diable was one of three privateers that Amos and Swallow captured within 15 days. While stationed at Shoreham Amos reportedly captured some 15 raiders of one sort or another. However, he complained that his expenses ate up most of his prize money.

On 22 December 1796, the Revenue cutter Swallow captured the French lugger privateer Diable Volant off Havre. Swallow brought her prize into Cowes. (Note: This may have been a 9-ton privateer commissioned in June 1796 in Boulogne under Jean-Pierre Sauvage-Clarté, with 34 men armed only with small arms. Her first cruise took place from June to August under Sauvage-Clarté; then from November to December she cruised under Jean-Augustin "Paquette" Huret. Her third cruise took place in December under Antoine Caudron, with a call to the port of Dieppe. She is said to have sailed again under Sauvage-Clarté in June 1797, and "probably" to have been captured by the British in June or July. This June 1797 cruise is inconsistent with Swallow's capture of Diable Volant in December 1796.)

The cutter Swallow, Thomas Amos, master, of 153 tons (bm), was listed in June 1797 as cruising as the Customs Board would direct.

In 1799, Swallow. T. Amos, master, was listed as patrolling between Gravesend and the Isle of Wight. She was described as being of 165 tons (bm), armed with 14 guns, and having a crew of 32.

Swallow participated in the Anglo-Russian invasion of Holland in August–October 1799. On 28 August 1799, she was with the British fleet that captured the Dutch hulks Drotchterland and Brooderschap, and the ships Helder, Venus, Minerva, and Hector, in the New Diep, in Holland. A partial pay-out of prize money resulted in a payment of 6s 8d to each seaman that had been in the fleet that day. She is also among the vessels listed as participating in the proceeds of the Vlieter Incident on 30 August when a large part of the navy of the Batavian Republic, commanded by Rear-Admiral Samuel Story, surrendered to the British navy on a sandbank near the Channel known as De Vlieter, near Wieringen.

On 26 May 1800, the revenue cutters Swallow, Greyhound, Swan, Rose, Falcon, and Dolphin sailed from Portsmouth on a secret mission. The cutters had been put under Admiralty orders and the speculation was that they were to go on some expedition to the "opposite coast".

On Sunday morning, 8 August 1802, a brig was observed in a sinking state off Brighton. The captain waved off all offers of assistance from fishing boats but could not dissuade Captain Amos of the revenue cutter Swallow who took the brig in tow and pulled her towards the shore. She was so waterlogged that she sank, but in water shallow enough that the brig's masts broke the surface. The brig's name was Adventure, and her master was William Coddling. (Note: Adventure, clincher-built, of 65 tons (bm), had been built in 1795 at Torbay. She was on a voyage from London to Leghorn.) When Lloyd's sent an investigator, he found that Adventure had been scuttled in a clear case of insurance fraud. The case had many entertaining elements, and some not so much. On the one hand, one of the owners was finally tracked down in the lodgings of one of his mistresses. On the other hand, Coddling was found guilty at trial and hanged. The owners had better counsel who succeeded in getting them freed because of ambiguities in the fraud law. William Codlin was executed on 27 November 1802.

Then on 19 November 1802, Swallow seized, off Beachy Head, the cutter Fox, of Hastings. Fox was carrying 370 kegs of liquor, 43 bales of tobacco, and four cases of cards, all dutiable goods.

On 19 February 1808, the gun-brig HMS Hardy was about five leagues off Beachy Head when she observed a lugger close to the shore. Hardy gave chase, only to be overtaken by a Revenue cutter, which caught with the quarry first. Then two other cutters joined the chase. After about a three-hour chase, the lugger struck. She proved to be "Revois", out of Dieppe the day before, and had made no captures. Revois was armed with sixteen 2 to 6-pounder guns and had a crew of 48 men under the command of Captain Friesmanton. The privateer's named turned out to be Revanche. Hardy shared the prize money with HMS Port Mahon, and the revenue cutters Falcon, Hawke, and Swallow. (Note: Revanche is likely a privateer from Calais, commissioned in February 1807. She made two cruises, first under an unknown captain from February to May 1807, then under François Fourmentin from December 1807 to January 1808.)

== 1816–1835 ==
On 15 December 1816 some boatmen from Deal brought the Revenue Cutter Swallow into Ramsgate. When they had found her there was no one on board.

In April 1819, Lieutenant William Pearce Stanley took command of the Revenue cutter Swallow. She was described as being of 165 tons (bm) and being armed with six 6-pounder carronades and two small brass guns. She had a crew of 37 men and boys. A few days later, on 17 May, Swallow took off the pilot from HMS Hecla, which was leaving on her first voyage of Arctic exploration. the pilot took with him a large number of letters from Hecla's officers and crew.

On 27 February 1821, Stanley captured the smuggling cutter Idas, of 177 tons (bm), after a long chase and a running fight. While out of gunshot, Idas threw her guns (9-poundrs) overboard, and much of her cargo as well. By the time Swallow caught up, Idas's crew had abandoned her. It appeared afterwards that three of her crew of about 30 men had been killed, and several wounded; Swallow had two men wounded. Idas had been carrying 700 tubs of spirits and about 50 bales of tobacco. On 19 July Stanley received promotion to Commander.

In 1823, a Swallow was listed among 33 surviving Revenue cutters.

In 1833, the revenue cutter Swallow, Lieutenant (Daniel M'Neale) Beatty, commander, left the Milford station. Her replacement was the cutter Skyklark, from Ireland. Beatty commanded Swallow from 9 April 1832 to September 1833.

On 27 March 1835, the Revenue cutter Hunter, Lieutenant Helby, got on shore on the Weymouth Sands. Swallow, Lieutenant W. Crispin, mistook Hunter's signal as an alarm rather than a signal of distress, came to her assistance, and also got on shore. Eventually Swallow was gotten off and brought into Weymouth and was expected to be repaired. Hunter could not be refloated and was completely lost.

Lastly, there was no Swallow listed among the Revenue cutters built between 18 July 1822 and 1 October 1838.
