= List of maritime disasters in the 18th century =

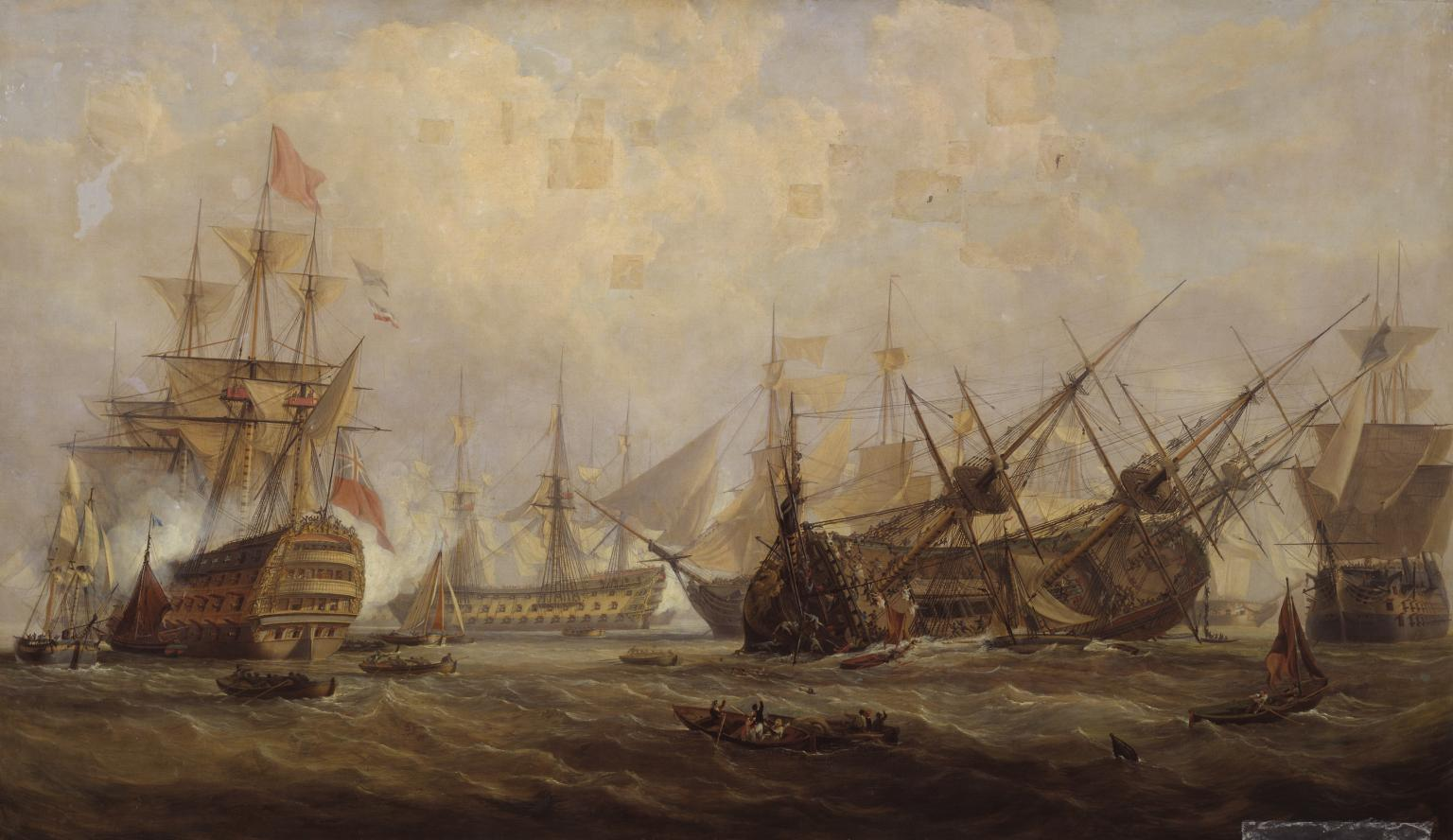
The sinking of the HMS Royal George on 29 August 1782

A maritime disaster is a disaster that occurs at sea, such as a ship sinking or foundering to the point of causing the death of many of its occupants. Many maritime disasters happen other than as a result of war. All ships, including those of the military, are vulnerable to problems from weather conditions, faulty design or human error. Some of the disasters below occurred during periods of conflict, although their losses were unrelated to any military action. The table listings are in decreasing order of the magnitude of casualties.

== Non-combat disasters ==
Many maritime disasters happen outside the realms of war. All ships, including those of the military, are vulnerable to problems from weather conditions, faulty design, or human error. Some of the disasters below occurred in periods of conflict, although their losses were unrelated to any military action. The table listings are in descending order of the magnitude of casualties suffered.

Year	Country	Description	Deaths	Image
1782	Great Britain	1782 Central Atlantic hurricane – On 17 September, a hurricane caught a British fleet under Admiral Graves off the banks of Newfoundland. The French prizes in the fleet, captured at the Battle of the Saintes, Ville de Paris, Glorieux and Hector foundered, as did HMS Ramillies and HMS Centaur. A number of the merchant fleet, including Dutton, British Queen, Withywood, Rodney, Ann, Minerva and Mentor, also foundered. Altogether around 3,500 lives were lost from the various ships.	3,500	
1703	England	Great storm of 1703 – In November a great storm swept the English Channel, causing the loss of thirteen men-of-war and the deaths of an estimated 1,500 seamen.	1,500+	
1707	Great Britain	The Scilly naval disaster of 1707 – On 22 October, a Royal Navy fleet en route from Gibraltar to Portsmouth sailed through dangerous reefs west of the Isles of Scilly. Four ships (HMS Association, HMS Eagle, HMS Romney and HMS Firebrand) sank. The exact number of crew lost is unknown. Statements vary between 1,400 and over 2,000. It was later determined that the main cause was the navigators' inability to calculate their longitude accurately.	1,400–2,000	
1744	Great Britain	HMS Victory – The 100-gun first-rate sank in a storm in the English Channel while returning to England on the night of 4 October. With her were lost Admiral Sir John Balchen and her entire complement of around 1,150 men.	1,150	
1760	Great Britain	HMS Ramillies – The second-rate, formerly HMS Royal Katherine, was wrecked at Bolt Head near Plymouth on 15 February. Of the crew of 850 aboard, 20 seamen and one midshipman survived.	829	
1782	Great Britain	HMS Royal George – Sank while moored at Portsmouth while the ship was being heeled for repairs on the underside on 29 August with a full crew and a considerable number of visitors aboard. The ship heeled too far and began taking water in the gun ports and sank. More than 800 people were lost, including Rear Admiral Richard Kempenfelt, and up to 300 women and 60 children who were visiting the ship.	800	Loss of the HMS Royal George
1738	Netherlands	Leusden – On 1 January the slave ship ran aground on a sand bank in the Marowijne River in Suriname. An estimated 664 people were lost when, as the ship sank, the crew sealed the compartments, locking in the slaves who had been herded within.	664	
1782	Great Britain	HMS Glorieux – On 16–17 September the second-rate was lost with all hands in a hurricane off the coast of Newfoundland.	600	
1749	Great Britain	HMS Namur – The second-rate was wrecked on 14 April in a storm near Fort St David. In total, 520 of her crew were drowned, though Captain Marshal survived.	520	
1794	Great Britain	HMS Ardent – In April, the third-rate ship was stationed off the harbor of Villa Franca, Corsica to watch two French frigates. It is presumed that she caught fire and blew up. HMS Berwick encountered some wreckage while cruising in the Gulf of Genoa in the summer that suggested fire and an explosion. A part of Ardent's quarterdeck with some gunlocks deeply embedded in it was found floating in the area as was splinter netting driven into planking. No trace was ever found of her 500-member crew.	500	
1796	Great Britain	HMS Courageux – On 18 December, this former French ship was shipwrecked in a gale on the Barbary Coast opposite Gibraltar.	464	
1781	Sweden	Prinsessan Sophia Albertina – Sank off Texel in the Netherlands in heavy weather. 419 people died.	419	
1782	Great Britain	HMS Centaur – In September, the third-rate ship of the line was one of the ships escorting prizes back to Britain from Jamaica when she foundered in the 1782 Central Atlantic hurricane near the Newfoundland Banks. Some 400 of her crew were lost. Captain John Nicholson Inglefield and 11 of his crew survived the wreck in one of her pinnaces, reaching the Azores after being in the open boat for 16 days without compass, quadrant or sail, and with only two quart bottles of water.	400	
1703	England	HMS Restoration – The third-rate ship was wrecked on the Goodwin Sands in the Great Storm of 1703 on 27 November. All 387 men were lost in the sinking.	387	
1796	Great Britain	HMS Amphion – On 22 September, the fifth-rate ship of the line was completing repairs at Plymouth, England. Being due to sail the next day, she had more than 100 relatives and visitors aboard as well as her crew. At about 4 p.m., she exploded without warning, killing 300 of the 312 aboard. The cause was never proven, but it was thought that the ship's gunner accidentally spilled gunpowder near the fore magazine which then ignited and set off the magazine itself.	300	
1743	Dutch East India Company	Hollandia – Was a Dutch East India Company ship that was wrecked near Sicily on 13 July, causing 276 deaths. She became separated from the fleet she was traveling with and struck Gunner Rock near Annet in the early hours of the morning sinking nearby with the loss of all hands.	276	
1799	Great Britain	HMS Lutine – Sank off Vlieland in heavy weather. She was carrying a large cargo of gold, most which remains unsalvaged. 269 people were lost.	269	
1735	Dutch Republic	't Vliegend Hert – Dutch East India Company ship sank due to heavy weather. All 256 people died.	256	
1755	British East India Company	Doddington – On 17 July, the Honourable East India Company ship was wrecked at Bird Island in Algoa Bay near present-day Port Elizabeth after she struck a rock. Of 270 crew and passengers, 23 survived.	247	
1790	Netherlands	Negotie – Dutch East India Company ship sank off Texel due to heavy weather. 238 people died.	238	
1797	Great Britain	HMS Tribune – On 16 November, the fifth-rate ship was wrecked and sank after running onto Thrum shoal at Herring Cove, Nova Scotia, in a storm. 12 of the 244 aboard survived.	232	
1703	England	HMS Northumberland – Was a 70-gun third-rate ship of the line of the English Royal Navy that was lost on 27 November with all hands at the Goodwin Sands in the Great Storm of 1703. Captain Greenway was among the 220 men (including 24 marines) who drowned.	220	
1703	England	HMS Stirling Castle – The third-rate ship was wrecked on the Goodwin Sands off Deal on 27 November, killing 206 men. The same storm also wrecked HMS Northumberland and HMS Restoration with large losses.	206	
1726	Netherlands	Aagtekerke – A Dutch East India Company ship that was lost without a trace. The ship vanished after leaving Cape Town on 3 January. There is some evidence from the crew of the wrecked ship Zeewyk that Aagtekerke may have been wrecked on the Abrolhos Islands because they found some remains of a Dutch vessel.	200	
1727	Dutch East India Company	Zeewyk – A Dutch East India Company ship that shipwrecked at the Houtman Abrolhos, off the coast of Western Australia, on 9 June 1727. A vessel (Sloepie) was constructed from the wreckage in the hopes of transporting the remaining crew to their destination, Batavia. Most of the crew survived and was ferried over to Gun Island.	72	
1735	Dutch Republic	Anna Catharina – Dutch East India Company ship sank due to heavy weather. All c. 175 people died.	175	
1786	British East India Company	Halsewell – On 6 January, the Honourable East India Company ship was wrecked at the start of a voyage from London to Madras. She lost her masts in a fierce storm in the English Channel and was driven onto the rocks below a cliff on the Isle of Purbeck in Dorset, England. Of her 240 crew and passengers, 74 survived.	166	
1717	Pirate ship	Whydah Gally – A slave ship that was captured by the pirate Captain Samuel Bellamy, and refitted as his flagship. On 26 April, she ran aground off Cape Cod and capsized in a fierce storm. Bellamy and 143 of his crew were lost, as was more than 4.5 short tons (4.1 tonnes) of gold and silver. There were two survivors. Whydah and her treasure eluded discovery for over 260 years, until being discovered in 1984 under only 14 feet (4.3 m) of water and 5 feet (1.5 m) of sand. She is the only authenticated pirate shipwreck yet found.	144	
1780	Great Britain	HMS Ontario – She sank in a storm on 31 October while en route from Fort Niagara to Oswego. About 130 men went down with the ship, consisting of soldiers, crew and prisoners of war. News of the ship's sinking was kept quiet for a number of years to hide the military loss.	130–172	
1777	United States	USS Reprisal – On September 14, Reprisal left France, for the United States. About October 1, she was lost off the banks of Newfoundland and all 129 on board, except the cook, went down with her.	129	
1799	Great Britain	HMS Orestes – The 18-gun Dutch-built brig-sloop disappeared around 5 November in the Indian Ocean and is presumed to have foundered in a hurricane with the loss of her entire crew.	125	
1797	Great Britain	HMS Vipere – A British brig-sloop, previously captured from the French, capsized in the Shannon Estuary just off the coast of County Clare.	120	
1761	Great Britain	Auguste– On 15 November, the sailing ship sank after grounding in a gale at Aspy Bay, Cape Breton, Nova Scotia while carrying exiles from the fall of New France. Of the 121 aboard, seven survived.	114	
1793	Great Britain	Pelican – On 20 March, the privateer, while on a pleasure and working-up cruise, sank in a sudden storm on the River Mersey. Of 134 people aboard, 102 were lost.	102	
1781	United States	USS Saratoga – On 18 March, the sloop was lost with all hands during a gale off the Bahamas.	86	
1728	Great Britain	Sea Horse – On 29 September, the slave ship and merchant vessel, owned by the South Seas Company, struck the southern reef of Gorriti Island and sank in the Bay of Maldonado (modern-day Uruguay). The ship, commanded by Captain Moore White, had previously unloaded a large cargo of enslaved people from Mozambique in Buenos Aires. Unable to secure an expected cargo of hides for the return voyage, the ship sailed with a secret stash of precious metals. Nearly 30 crew members drowned.	30	

== Wartime disasters ==
Disasters with high losses of life can occur in times of armed conflict. Shown below are some of the known events with major losses.

Year	Country	Description	Lives lost	Image
1795	France	Séduisant – A French 74-gun ship of the line that sank on 16 December while leaving Brest for the Expédition d'Irlande. Out of 600 crew and 610 soldiers, 60 survived. The wreck was found in 1986.	max. 1,150	French ship Séduisant
1711	Great Britain	Quebec expedition – On 22 August, seven transport ships and one storeship were wrecked in thick fog on the Saint Lawrence River Canada, during a British attempt to attack Quebec in 1711 during Queen Anne's War.	850	
1708	Spain	San José – On 8 June in an engagement between a British squadron under Charles Wager and the Spanish treasure fleet, known as Wager's Action, the Spanish ship exploded and sank killing 689 of the 700 aboard.	689	Spanish galleon San José
1710	Denmark	Dannebroge – On 4 October, in the Great Northern War, the Dano-Norwegian ship-of-the-line exploded and sank after catching fire during the Battle of Køge Bay. Few of the 600 men survived the explosion: some sources say three; others nine.	591–597	Danish ship of the line HDMS Dannebroge
1796	France	Impatiente – On 29 December the frigate sank in a gale. Seven of the 413 aboard survived.	413	
1798	France	Orient – The French 118-gun Océan-class ship of the line was flagship of the French fleet at the Battle of the Nile in August. She came under fire from five British ships, caught fire and exploded when her magazines detonated. The number of casualties has been disputed with the British reporting 70 survivors. Her crew was far from complete at the time, and a number of survivors may have been rescued by French ships. Contre-amiral Denis Decrès reported 760 survivors.	370–1060	
1758	Great Britain	Duke William – The British transport, bound from Canada to France, was caught by a storm off England. She sank on 13 December, foundering with all crew and passengers on board.	366	
1799	Great Britain	HMS Sceptre – A third-rate ship of the line caught at anchor in a storm on 5 November with seven other ships in Table Bay near the Cape of Good Hope. About 1900 hrs she was driven ashore on a reef at Woodstock Beach. She was battered to pieces and about 349 sailors and marines were lost. One officer, two midshipmen, 47 sailors and one marine were saved but nine of these died on the beach.	358	
1794	France	Vengeur du Peuple – In the battle named the Glorious First of June on 1 June the ship of the line was disabled after a fierce duel with HMS Brunswick and surrendered after losing hope of rescue by a French ship. After a few hours, as British ships were beginning rescue operations she listed and foundered taking almost half her crew with her. Of the 723 aboard 356 were lost in the battle and sinking.	356	
1778	United States	USS Randolph – On 7 March the US frigate's lookouts sighted sail on the horizon which proved to be the British 64-gun third-rate ship of the line HMS Yarmouth. That evening Randolph engaged the British warship and was engaged in a heavy exchange of fire with her when for some unknown cause, possibly a chance spark or more likely a stray cannon shot, ignited her magazine and Randolph exploded. 311 of her crew were lost; four survived.	311	
1795	France	Alcide – In the Battle of Hyères Islands on 13 July the 74-gun ship of the line was becalmed and had to fight the British ships HMS Victory, Culloden and Cumberland. She damaged Culloden's rigging but was outgunned and surrendered to Cumberland. The French frigates Justice and Alceste tried to tow her to safety but Victory drove them off. Soon after a fire broke out on Alcide', reportedly in her tops or from her own heated shots, and she exploded 30 minutes later killing 300 men. The British squadron rescued 300 survivors.	300	
1782	Spain	During the Great Siege of Gibraltar, the Spanish constructed 10 floating batteries, which had 212 cannons and were crewed by 5,260 men. British heated shot quickly destroyed all of the batteries, killing 719 men. The destruction of the floating batteries marked the end of actual operations during the siege.	719	The destruction of the floating batteries at Gibraltar, by Thomas Whitcombe.
1797	France	Droits de l'Homme – In the action of 13 January 1797, off Penmarch, the French 74-gun ship of the line met the British frigates HMS Indefatigable and Amazon. The sea was rough preventing Droits de l'Homme from using her lower deck batteries and from boarding the British frigates. After 13 hours of combat the French ship, having lost her rudder, masts and anchors, ran aground off Plozévet. A storm delayed rescue for five days and 250–300 of her crew were lost.	250–390	

== See also ==
- List of shipwrecks in the 1700s
- List of shipwrecks in the 1710s
- List of shipwrecks in the 1720s
- List of shipwrecks in the 1730s
- List of shipwrecks in the 1740s
- List of shipwrecks in the 1750s
- List of maritime disasters
- List of maritime disasters in the 19th century
- List of maritime disasters in the 20th century
- List of maritime disasters in World War I
- List of maritime disasters in World War II
- List of maritime disasters in the 21st century
- Shipwreck
- List of shipwrecks
- List of disasters
- List of accidents and disasters by death toll
- List by death toll of ships sunk by submarines
- List of RORO vessel accidents
