= List of shipwrecks in the 1730s =

The List of shipwrecks in the 1730s includes some ships sunk, wrecked or otherwise lost during the 1730s.

== 1730 ==
=== March ===
(Dates from 1 January to 24 March 1730 under the calendar used now were considered 1729 "old style" by the British at the time. Within the British Empire, the start of the New Year was on 25 March though it was on 1 January in other European nations. In addition, the British still used the Julian calendar, which was 11 days behind the Gregorian calendar by 1730; thus, 3 March 1730 "new style" would have been 18 February 1729 "old style").

==== 3 March ====
List of shipwrecks: 3 March 1730
Ship	State	Description
Aimable Marthe	France	The trois-mâts was wrecked on the Île de Ré, Charente-Maritime. She was on a voyage from La Rochelle, Charente-Maritime, to Martinique.

=== August ===
==== 2 August ====
List of shipwrecks: 2 August 1730
Ship	State	Description
Wilks	Great Britain	The frigate foundered in the Atlantic Ocean (36°30′N 56°00′W). Sixteen crew survived. She was on a voyage from St Christopher's to London.

=== October ===
==== 2 October ====
List of shipwrecks: 2 October 1730
Ship	State	Description
Vostochny Gavriil (Восточный Гавриил, 'Eastern Gabriel')	Russian Empire	The ship was wrecked 30 versts (17 nautical miles (32 km)) from Bolsheretsk. She was on a voyage from Okhotsk to Kamchatka.

=== Unknown date ===
List of shipwrecks: Unknown date in 1730
Ship	State	Description
Nuestra Señora de Lorento y San Francisco Xavier	Spain	The ship sank off Anegada.

== 1731 ==
=== October ===
==== Unknown date ====
List of shipwrecks: Unknown date in October 1731
Ship	State	Description
Golshtiniya (Голштиния, 'Holstein')	Imperial Russian Navy	The fluyt ran aground in Eru Bay and was wrecked. Dismantled in situ in 1732.

=== November ===
==== Unknown date ====
List of shipwrecks: November 1731
Ship	State	Description
Swan	(Kingdom of Great Britain) British America	The brigantine was driven ashore and wrecked at Squan, New Jersey. She was on a voyage from Boston, Massachusetts, to Madeira, Portugal.

=== January ===
==== 8 January ====
List of shipwrecks: 8 January 1731
Ship	State	Description
Unidentified boats		Boats were sunk and wrecked in the Storfjorden in Norway when a landslide generated a megatsunami 100 metres (328 ft) in height that struck Stranda and inflicted damage as far away as Ørskog.

=== Unknown date ===
List of shipwrecks: Unknown date in 1731
Ship	State	Description
Astrabad (Астрабад)	Imperial Russian Navy	Disappeared without a trace in the Caspian Sea.
Eyles	British East India Company	The East Indiaman was lost in the Hooghly River, India.
HMS Hawk	(Kingdom of Great Britain) Royal Navy	The sloop-of-war foundered.

== 1732 ==
=== May ===
==== 22 May ====
List of shipwrecks: 22 May 1732
Ship	State	Description
Merkury (Меркурий, 'Mercury')	Imperial Russian Navy	The packet ship ran aground and capsized off Seskar. Her crew were rescued. She was on a voyage from Kronstadt to Lübeck. She was declared a total loss and dismantled in situ.

=== June ===
==== 24 June ====
List of shipwrecks: 24 June 1732
Ship	State	Description
Dolphin	(Kingdom of Great Britain) British America	The sloop capsized in the Atlantic Ocean (25°30′N 65°39′W) during a squall with the loss of a crew member. Three more of her crew died before the survivors were rescued by William and Thomas (France). Dolphin was on a voyage from North Carolina to Montserrat.

=== September ===
==== 28 September ====
List of shipwrecks: 28 September 1732
Ship	State	Description
Midloo	Dutch East India Company	During her voyage from Batavia, Dutch East Indies to the Dutch Republic, the ship stranded on 27 September 1732 at Vlieland, during the night she foundered at a sandbank where she broke apart due to the storm in the afternoon. Of the 118 people on board, 100 people drowned.

== 1733 ==
=== July ===
==== 15 July ====
List of shipwrecks: 15 July 1733
Ship	State	Description
Augustias	Spain	The galleon was wrecked in a hurricane off Long Key, Spanish Florida.
Delores	Spain	The aviso ran aground in a hurricane off Key Largo, Spanish Florida. Survivors were rescued by El Africa (Spain). Delores was refloated some months later.
El Gallo Indiano	Spain	The almiranta was wrecked in a hurricane off Long Key.
El Rubi	Spain	The ship was wrecked in a hurricane off Upper Matecumbe Key, Spanish Florida, with the loss of two of her crew.
Herrera	Spain	The galleon was wrecked in a hurricane off Islamorada, Spanish Florida.
La Floridana	Spain	The frigate was wrecked in a hurricane off Islamorada.
Nuestra Señora de Balvaneda or El Infante	Spain	The galleon was wrecked in a hurricane on the Fire Coral Shoal, off the coast of Spanish Florida. All on board survived.
Nuestra Señora de Belem y San Juan Bautista	Spain	The ship was wrecked in a hurricane off Islamadora.
Nuestra Señora de las Augustias	Spain	The nao was wrecked in a hurricane off Long Key, Spanish Florida.
Nuestra Señora del Carmen, San Antonio de Padua y las Animas	Spain	The ship ran aground in a hurricane off Upper Matecumbe Key. All on board were rescued. Proving not to be refloatable, she was subsequently set afire and destroyed.
Nuestra Señora del Populo	Spain	The guerra, a pink, was wrecked in a hurricane off Key Largo. Survivors were rescued by El Africa (Spain).
Nuestra Señora de los Dolores Y Santa Isabel or El Nuevo Londres	Spain	The nao was wrecked in a hurricane off Islamadora.
San Felipe	Spain	The galleon was wrecked in a hurricane at Islamorada. There were survivors.
San Francisco	Spain	The ship was wrecked in a hurricane off Long Key.
San José y las Animas	Spain	The galleon was wrecked in a hurricane at Plantation Key, Spanish Florida. All on board survived.
San Pedro	Spain	The galleon was wrecked in a hurricane off Indian Key, Spanish Florida.
Sueco de Aragon	Spain	The ship was wrecked in a hurricane off Conch Key, Spanish Florida.

=== November ===
==== 17 November ====
List of shipwrecks: 17 November 1733
Ship	State	Description
Marget	Great Britain	The ship was wrecked on Bodie Island, North Carolina, British America, with the loss of eleven lives. She was on a voyage from Charlestown, South Carolina, to London.

=== December ===
==== 21 December ====
List of shipwrecks: 21 December 1733
Ship	State	Description
Simbirsk (Симбирск)	Imperial Russian Navy	The ship was driven ashore near Derbent.

== 1734 ==
=== September ===
==== 12 September ====
List of shipwrecks: 12 September 1734
Ship	State	Description
Kars-Maker (Карс-Макер, 'Keersmaeker')	Imperial Russian Navy	The galiot was wrecked with the loss of one crew member. She was on a voyage from Kronstadt to Reval.

=== November ===
==== 17 November ====
List of shipwrecks: 17 November 1734
Ship	State	Description
Okham (or Ockham)	British East India Company	The East Indiaman was destroyed by fire at Calcutta while loading in the Hooghly River, India.

=== Unknown date ===
List of shipwrecks: Unknown date in 1734
Ship	State	Description
Harschendal	Dutch Republic	The ship was wrecked on the Goodwin Sands, Kent, Great Britain.

== 1735 ==
=== February ===
==== 3 February ====
List of shipwrecks: 3 February 1735
Ship	State	Description
Anna Catharina	Dutch East India Company	The East Indiaman was wrecked off Rammekens, Zeeland, with the loss of all hands. She was on a voyage from Rammekens to the Netherlands East Indies.
't Vliegend Hert	Dutch East India Company	The East Indiaman foundered off Middelburg with the loss of all 256 people on board. She was on a voyage from Rammekens to the Netherlands East Indies.

== 1736 ==
=== January ===
==== 1 January ====
List of shipwrecks: 1 January 1736
Ship	State	Description
Falconburg	(Kingdom of Great Britain) British America	The brig was abandoned in the Atlantic Ocean. Her crew were rescued by a schooner. She was on a voyage from North Carolina to Boston, Massachusetts.

=== May ===
==== 29 May ====
List of shipwrecks: 29 May 1736
Ship	State	Description
Ekspeditsion (Экспедицион, 'Expedition')	Imperial Russian Navy	The koch was driven aground by ice and wrecked off the mouth of the Pechora River. All on board were rescued.

=== October ===
==== 9 October ====
List of shipwrecks: 9 October 1736
Ship	State	Description
Triumph	Great Britain	The vessel, from Jamaica carrying 500 hogshead of sugar and a large quantity of rum struck the Steval Rock in the Isles of Scilly.

=== Unknown date ===
List of shipwrecks: 1736
Ship	State	Description
HMS Biddeford	(Kingdom of Great Britain) Royal Navy	The sixth rate foundered after 26 January.
HMS Princess Louisa	(Kingdom of Great Britain) Royal Navy	The sixth rate was wrecked.

== 1737 ==
=== May ===
==== 21 May ====
List of shipwrecks: 21 May 1737
Ship	State	Description
De Buys	Dutch East India Company	The 130 foot long fluyt sank during a storm at Cape of Good Hope during her return voyage from Batavia, Dutch East Indies to the Dutch Republic. 47 of the 77 crew were killed.
Duynbeek	Dutch East India Company	The 145 foot long merchant ship sank during a storm at Cape of Good Hope during her return voyage from Batavia, Dutch East Indies to the Dutch Republic. 11 of the 98 crew were killed.
Flora	Dutch East India Company	The 145 foot long “hekboot” (a fluyt variant) sank at Cape of Good Hope (where she arrived on 29 April 1737) during her return voyage from Batavia, Dutch East Indies to the Dutch Republic. 59 of the 111 crew were killed.
Goudriaan	Dutch East India Company	The 130 foot long fluyt sank during a storm at Cape of Good Hope. The skipper and some crew members were rescued. 10 of the 81 crew were killed.
Paddenburg	Dutch East India Company	The 145 foot long merchant ship sank during a storm at Cape of Good Hope during her return voyage from Batavia, Dutch East Indies to the Dutch Republic. 12 of the 105 crew were killed.
Rodenrys	Dutch East India Company	The 130 foot long fluyt sank during a storm at Cape of Good Hope during her return voyage from Batavia, Dutch East Indies to the Dutch Republic. 7 of the 82 crew were killed.
Victoria	Dutch East India Company	The ship sank during a storm at Cape of Good Hope.
Westerwyk	Dutch East India Company	The 145 foot long merchant ship sank during a storm at Cape of Good Hope during her return voyage from Batavia, Dutch East Indies to the Dutch Republic. 2 of the 103 crew were killed.
Ypenroode	Dutch East India Company	The 130 foot long merchant ship sank during a storm at Cape of Good Hope during her return voyage from Batavia, Dutch East Indies to the Dutch Republic. 19 of the 83 crew were killed.

=== June ===
==== 29 June ====
List of shipwrecks: 29 June 1737
Ship	State	Description
170 unnamed vessels	Imperial Russian Navy	Lacy's campaign to Crimea: 170 boats (out of 217 total) of the Azov Flotilla were driven ashore and wrecked near Strilkove at the Arabat Spit.

=== July ===
==== 1 July ====
List of shipwrecks: 1 July 1737
Ship	State	Description
Sixteen unnamed vessels	Imperial Russian Navy	Lacy's campaign to Crimea: The boats of the Azov Flotilla were wrecked or floundered near Strilkove at the Arabat Spit.

==== 4 July ====
List of shipwrecks: 4 July 1737
Ship	State	Description
Unnamed	Imperial Russian Navy	Lacy's campaign to Crimea: The Azov Flotilla boat sank at the Arabat Spit. She was on a voyage from Strilkove area to the Henichesk Strait.

==== Unknown date ====
List of shipwrecks: Unknown date in July 1737
Ship	State	Description
Catherine	Great Britain	The snow foundered off Cape Sable Island, Nova Scotia, British America, with the loss of 98 of the 201 people on board.

=== October ===
==== 13 October ====
List of shipwrecks: 13 October 1737
Ship	State	Description
Fortuna (Фортуна)	Imperial Russian Navy	The ship was driven ashore and wrecked at the mouth of the Bolshaya. She was on a voyage from Okhotsk to Bolsheretsk.

=== December ===
==== 29 December ====
List of shipwrecks: 29 December 1737
Ship	State	Description
Vendela	(Denmark) Danish Asiatic Company	The East Indiaman was wrecked off Fetlar, Shetland Islands. She was on a voyage from Copenhagen to Tranquebar.

=== January ===
==== Unknown date ====
List of shipwrecks: January 1737
Ship	State	Description
Leusden	Dutch East India Company	The slave ship was travelling from Elmina, Ghana to Surinam, carrying around 700 enslaved men, women and children. The vessel capsized slowly in a storm at the mouth of the Maroni and before leaving the vessel, the crew deliberately nailed shut the hatches on the deck so that the slaves imprisoned below could not escape; drowning or suffocating between 664 and 702 people.

=== Unknown date ===
List of shipwrecks: Unknown date in 1737
Ship	State	Description
Hannah	(Kingdom of Great Britain) British America	The sloop was wrecked on the coast of North Carolina before 6 January. She was on a voyage from Philadelphia, Pennsylvania, to Charles Town, South Carolina.
Priscilla	Great Britain	The brig was driven ashore at Nash Point, Glamorgan, where she was stripped and set afire by the local inhabitants.
Pye	Great Britain	The snow was driven ashore at Nash Point, where she was stripped and set afire by the local inhabitants.

== 1738 ==
=== December ===
==== 27 December ====
List of shipwrecks: 27 December 1738
Ship	State	Description
Princess Augusta	Great Britain	The ship was wrecked on Block Island, Rhode Island, British America. She was on a voyage from the Electorate of the Palatinate to British America.

=== March ===
==== 10 March ====
List of shipwrecks: 10 March 1738
Ship	State	Description
Sussex	British East India Company	The East Indiaman sprang a leak in the Indian Ocean and was abandoned by 82 of her 98 crew, who were rescued by Winchester ( British East India Company). Sussex was subsequently beached on Bassas da India where she was wrecked with the loss of eleven of the sixteen crew on board. Only one of the five survivors reached Madagascar in the ship's boat.

==== 21 March ====
List of shipwrecks: 21 March 1738
Ship	State	Description
Anna and Helena	Dutch Republic	The hoy was driven ashore at Thurlestone, Devon, Great Britain, where she was wrecked and plundered by the local inhabitants. She was on a voyage from Bordeaux, Gironde, France, to Flensburg.

=== September ===
==== 5 September ====
List of shipwrecks: 5 September 1738
Ship	State	Description
Yekaterina (Екатерина)	Russian Empire	The fluyt ran aground on a reef and was wrecked at the Hanko Peninsula, Grand Duchy of Finland. She was on a voyage from Arkhangelsk to Kronstadt.

=== Unknown date ===
List of shipwrecks: Unknown date in 1738
Ship	State	Description
La Victoria	Spanish Navy	The Man-of-war was wrecked on Anegada.
Speedwell	(Kingdom of Great Britain) British America	The sloop was driven ashore and wrecked at Barnegat, New Jersey, before 26 October. Her crew were rescued. She was on a voyage from North Carolina to Boston, Massachusetts.

== 1739 ==
=== December ===
==== 19 December ====
List of shipwrecks: 19 December 1739
Ship	State	Description
Rooswijk	Dutch East India Company	The East Indiaman was wrecked on the Goodwin Sands, Kent, Great Britain, with the loss of all hands, over 200 people. She was on a voyage from Texel, North Holland, to Batavia, Netherlands East Indies.

=== February ===
==== 19 February ====
List of shipwrecks: 19 February 1739
Ship	State	Description
Mary	Great Britain	The ship was wrecked at the mouth of the Kenfig River, Glamorgan.

=== September ===
==== 20 September ====
List of shipwrecks: 20 September 1739
Ship	State	Description
Lavensar (Лавенсар, 'Lavansaari')	Russian Empire	The fluyt ran aground and was wrecked off Moshchny Island. She was on a voyage from Reval to Kronstadt.

== Notes ==
1. Until 1752, the year began on Lady Day (25 March) Thus 24 March 1730 was followed by 25 March 1731. 31 December 1731 was followed by 1 January 1731.
