= List of shipwrecks in the 1710s =

The list of shipwrecks in the 1710s includes ships sunk, foundered, grounded, or otherwise lost during the 1710s.

== 1710 ==
=== March ===
==== 2 March ====
List of shipwrecks: March 1710
| Ship | State | Description |
|---|---|---|
| Christianus Quintus | Denmark | African slave trade: The ship was wrecked near Cahuita, Limón, Costa Rica. |
| Fredericus Quartus | Denmark | African slave trade: The ship was wrecked near Cahuita, Limón, Costa Rica. |

=== July ===
==== 10 July ====
List of shipwrecks: 10 July 1710
| Ship | State | Description |
|---|---|---|
| Herbert | unknown | The ship foundered in the Atlantic Ocean off Montauk Point, Long Island, New York, British America. Her crew were rescued. |

=== December ===
==== 11 December ====
List of shipwrecks: 11 December 1710
| Ship | State | Description |
|---|---|---|
| Nottingham Galley | Great Britain | During a voyage from London to Boston, the ship was driven ashore and wrecked on rocks on Boon Island off York, Massachusetts Bay Colony (now Maine), British America. Her wreck sank at 43°07′18″N 070°28′36″W. Sources differ on how many members of her crew survived, claiming both that all 14 did and that four perished and 10 survived. The survivors were stranded on Boon Island for 28 days before they were rescued. |

==== Unknown date ====
List of shipwrecks: December 1710
| Ship | State | Description |
|---|---|---|
| Kromstrijen | Dutch East India Company | The East Indiaman, a fluyt, was lost in the Gulf of Bengal. |

== 1711 ==
=== October ===
==== 7 October ====
List of shipwrecks: 7 October 1711
| Ship | State | Description |
|---|---|---|
| HMS Feversham | (Kingdom of Great Britain) Royal Navy | Quebec Expedition: The fifth rate was wrecked on Scaterie Island, Nova Scotia, with the loss of 102 lives. |
| Joseph | Great Britain | Quebec Expedition: The transport ship was wrecked on the coast of Cape Breton, Nova Scotia. |
| Mary | Great Britain | Quebec Expedition: The transport ship was wrecked on the coast of Cape Breton, Nova Scotia. |
| Neptune | Great Britain | Quebec Expedition: The transport ship was wrecked on the coast of Cape Breton, Nova Scotia. |

=== November ===
==== 23 November ====
List of shipwrecks: 23 November 1711
| Ship | State | Description |
|---|---|---|
| Bretagne | Kingdom of France | The Saint Malo privateer frigate hit rocks, while leaving her home port, and broke up beneath the Fort de la Latte. The crew survived. |

==== Unknown date ====
List of shipwrecks: November 1711
| Ship | State | Description |
|---|---|---|
| Liefde | Dutch East India Company | The East Indiaman was wrecked off the Shetland Islands, Great Britain, with the loss of all but one of her 300 crew. |

=== Unknown date ===
List of shipwrecks: Unknown date in 1711
| Ship | State | Description |
|---|---|---|
| HMS Edgar | (Kingdom of Great Britain) Royal Navy | The third-rate ship of the line was destroyed by fire at Spithead, Hampshire. |

== 1712 ==
=== March ===
==== 16 March ====
List of shipwrecks: 16 March 1712
| Ship | State | Description |
|---|---|---|
| HMS Dragon | (Kingdom of Great Britain) Royal Navy | The fourth rate frigate was escorting a convoy from Guernsey to England when it was wrecked on Les Casquets, west of Alderney, Channel Islands, with no recorded lives lost. |

=== June ===
List of shipwrecks: June 1712
| Ship | State | Description |
|---|---|---|
| Zuytdorp | Dutch East India Company | The East Indiaman was wrecked at a location now known as Zuytdorp Cliffs, Australia. |

=== August ===
==== 24 August ====
List of shipwrecks: 24 August 1712
| Ship | State | Description |
|---|---|---|
| Unnamed | Imperial Russian Navy | The ship was wrecked in Lake Ladoga near Novaya Ladoga. She was on a voyage from Olonetskaya shipyard to Saint Petersburg. |

== 1713 ==
=== March ===
==== 15 March ====
List of shipwrecks: 15 March 1713
| Ship | State | Description |
|---|---|---|
| Rijnenburg | Dutch East India Company | The East Indiaman, a fluyt, was wrecked off the Shetland Islands, Great Britain. |

=== July ===
==== 11 July ====
List of shipwrecks: 11 July 1713
| Ship | State | Description |
|---|---|---|
| Riga (Рига) | Imperial Russian Navy | Great Northern War: The Riga-class ship of the line (flagship of vice admiral Cornelius Cruys) ran aground west of Hogland whilst pursuing a Royal Swedish Navy squadron. She was refloated. |
| Svyatoy Antony (Святой Антоний, 'St. Anthony') | Imperial Russian Navy | Great Northern War: The ship of the line ran aground west of Hogland whilst pursuing a Royal Swedish Navy squadron. She was refloated. See also: § 9 November 1716 |
| Vyborg (Выборг) | Imperial Russian Navy | Great Northern War: The Riga-class ship of the line ran aground west of Hogland whilst pursuing a Royal Swedish Navy squadron. Her hull broke open the next day and she was burnt to prevent capture by the Swedes. |

== 1714 ==
=== May ===
==== 28 May ====
List of shipwrecks: 28 May 1714
| Ship | State | Description |
|---|---|---|
| Arion | Dutch East India Company | The East Indiaman ran aground and was wrecked in the Paracel Islands. She was on a voyage from Batavia, Netherlands East Indies, to a Japanese port. |

=== July ===
==== 27 July ====
List of shipwrecks: 27 July 1714
| Ship | State | Description |
|---|---|---|
| Unnamed | Imperial Russian Navy | Great Northern War: The galley ran aground off the Hanko Peninsula and was captured by the Swedes. |

=== October ===
==== 10 October ====
List of shipwrecks: 10 October 1714
| Ship | State | Description |
|---|---|---|
| Adélaïde | Kingdom of France | A hurricane wrecked the ship as she was on her way to Havana after she had delivered a cargo of slaves from West Africa to Saint Domingue. |

=== November ===
==== 2 November ====
List of shipwrecks: 2 November 1714
| Ship | State | Description |
|---|---|---|
| Narva (Нарва) | Imperial Russian Navy | The Svyataya Yekaterina-class ship of the line ran aground at Petergof. She was refloated on 9 November. See also: § 27 June 1715 |

=== January ===
==== 1 January ====
List of shipwrecks: 1 January 1712
| Ship | State | Description |
|---|---|---|
| Saint Jerome | Kingdom of France | The ship foundered off Cape Sable Island, Nova Scotia. She was on a voyage from Quebec to a French port. |

== 1715 ==
=== June ===
==== 27 June ====
List of shipwrecks: 27 June 1715
| Ship | State | Description |
|---|---|---|
| Narva (Нарва) | Imperial Russian Navy | The Svyataya Yekaterina-class ship of the line was struck by lightning, exploded and sank at Kronstadt with only 19 of her 400 crew surviving. The wreck was raised after the Treaty of Nystad had been signed in 1721, as it was hindering navigation. See also: § 2 November 1714 |

=== July ===
==== 31 July ====
List of shipwrecks: 31 July 1715
| Ship | State | Description |
|---|---|---|
| Almiramta | Spain | The ship was wrecked off the coast of Spanish Florida in a hurricane. |
| Capitana | Spain | The ship was wrecked off the coast of Spanish Florida in a hurricane. |
| El Ciervo | Spain | The ship was wrecked off the coast of Spanish Florida in a hurricane. |
| Maria Galante | Spain | The balandrita was wrecked off the coast of Spanish Florida in a hurricane. |
| Nuestra Señora de la Concepcion | Spain | The ship was wrecked off the coast of Spanish Florida in a hurricane. |
| Nuestra Señora de las Nieves | Spain | The patache was wrecked off the coast of Spanish Florida in a hurricane. |
| San Miguel | Spanish Navy | The frigate was wrecked off the coast of Spanish Florida in a hurricane. |
| Refuerzo | Spain | The ship was wrecked off the coast of Spanish Florida in a hurricane. |
| Santísima Trinidad | Spain | The ship ran aground near Fort Pierce, Spanish Florida, in a hurricane. She was set afire and destroyed after her cargo had been salvaged. |

=== August ===
==== 25 August ====
List of shipwrecks: 25 August 1715
| Ship | State | Description |
|---|---|---|
| Huis te Warmelo | Dutch Republic Navy | The fourth rate frigate foundered in the Gulf of Finland with the loss of all 130 people on board. |

=== September ===
==== Unknown date ====
List of shipwrecks: Unknown date in September 1715
| Ship | State | Description |
|---|---|---|
| Royal Transport (Транспорт-Рояль) | Imperial Russian Navy | Great Northern War: The yacht, gifted to Peter the Great by William III of England in 1698, was wrecked near Gothenburg, Sweden. Twenty-one crew were taken prisoner by the Swedes. The wreck was claimed to have been found in 2015. |

=== Unknown date ===
List of shipwrecks: Unknown date in 1715
| Ship | State | Description |
|---|---|---|
| Unnamed | Imperial Russian Navy | The transport ship was wrecked near Gothenburg, Sweden. |

== 1716 ==
=== August ===
List of shipwrecks: Unknown August 1716
| Ship | State | Description |
|---|---|---|
| Unknown | Massachusetts Bay | The new fishing schooner sank in mid August off Sable Island, Nova Scotia. Lost with all hands. |

=== September ===
==== 20 September ====
List of shipwrecks: 20 September 1716
| Ship | State | Description |
|---|---|---|
| Catherine | British East India Company | The East Indiaman ran aground and was wrecked in the Sunda Strait. |

=== October ===
==== 20 October ====
List of shipwrecks: 20 October 1716
| Ship | State | Description |
|---|---|---|
| Lizet (Лизет, 'Lisette') | Imperial Russian Navy | The snow ran aground and was wrecked in the vicinity of Stevns Klint, Denmark. Her crew were rescued. |

=== November ===
==== 9 November ====
List of shipwrecks: 9 November 1716
| Ship | State | Description |
|---|---|---|
| Fortuna (Фортуна) | Imperial Russian Navy | The ship ran aground and was wrecked the following day at Reval. Her crew were rescued. |
| Svyatoy Antony (Святой Антоний, 'St. Anthony') | Imperial Russian Navy | The transport ship ran aground and was wrecked the following day at Reval with the loss of all hands. See also: § 11 July 1713 |

==== 10 November ====
List of shipwrecks: 10 November 1716
| Ship | State | Description |
|---|---|---|
| HMS Auguste | (Kingdom of Great Britain) Royal Navy | The Man-of-war was driven ashore and wrecked on Læsø, Denmark. Most of her crew survived. |

=== December ===
==== 1 December ====
List of shipwrecks: 1 December 1716
| Ship | State | Description |
|---|---|---|
| Printsessa (Принцесса, 'Princess') | Imperial Russian Navy | The snow ran aground and was wrecked at the island of Rømø, Denmark. Her crew were rescued. She was on a voyage from Jutland to Holland. |

=== Unknown date ===
List of shipwrecks: Unknown date in 1716
| Ship | State | Description |
|---|---|---|
| Lyustikh (Люстих, 'Lustig') | Imperial Russian Navy | The ship was presumed to have foundered in the Baltic Sea with the loss of all hands. |

== 1717 ==
=== April ===
==== 26 April ====
List of shipwrecks: 26 April 1717
| Ship | State | Description |
|---|---|---|
| Whydah Gally | Samuel Bellamy | The 100-foot (30 m) full-rigged galley — a pirate ship — grounded during a storm off a portion of Eastham, Massachusetts Bay Colony, British America, that later became Wellfleet, Massachusetts, 500 yards (460 m) off what later became known as Marconi Beach. She capsized and was wrecked with the loss of all but two of her crew. Her wreck settled in 30 feet (9.1 m) of water. |

=== December ===
==== 25 December ====
List of shipwrecks: 25 December 1717
| Ship | State | Description |
|---|---|---|
| HDMS Lossen | (Denmark) Dano-Norwegian Navy | Christmas Flood of 1717: The frigate was wrecked on Vesterøy with the loss of about 50 of her 103 crew. |

== 1718 ==
=== June ===
==== 10 June ====
List of shipwrecks: May 1718
| Ship | State | Description |
|---|---|---|
| Queen Anne's Revenge | Blackbeard | The frigate ran aground in Beaufort Inlet, North Carolina, British America |
| Adventure | Blackbeard | The sloop ran aground in Beaufort Inlet, North Carolina, British America |

== 1719 ==
=== March ===
==== 2 March ====
List of shipwrecks: 2 March 1719
| Ship | State | Description |
|---|---|---|
| Vansittart | British East India Company | The East Indiaman was wrecked on Maio Island, Cape Verde Islands, on the outward leg of her maiden voyage to Madras. |

==== Unknown date ====
List of shipwrecks: Unknown date in March 1719
| Ship | State | Description |
|---|---|---|
| HMS Crown | (Kingdom of Great Britain) Royal Navy | The fourth rate frigate was wrecked. |

=== May ===
==== 23 May ====
List of shipwrecks: 23 May 1719
| Ship | State | Description |
|---|---|---|
| Lesnoye (Лесное) | Imperial Russian Navy | The ship of the line was holed by her own anchor, capsized and sank at Kronstadt. She was later refloated. |

=== October ===
==== 1 October ====
List of shipwrecks: 1 October 1719
| Ship | State | Description |
|---|---|---|
| London (Лондон) | Imperial Russian Navy | The ship of the line ran aground and was wrecked near the Tolbukhin Spit, west of Kotlin Island. She was on a voyage from Reval to Kronstadt. Her crew were rescued. The area subsequently became known as the London Shallows. |
| Portsmut (Портсмут, 'Portsmouth') | Imperial Russian Navy | The ship of the line ran aground and was wrecked near the Tolbukhin Spit, west of Kotlin Island. She was on a voyage from Reval to Kronstadt. Her crew were rescued. |

== Notes ==
1. Until 1752, in Great Britain and its possessions, the year began on Lady Day (25 March) Thus 24 March 1710 was followed by 25 March 1711. 31 December 1711 was followed by 1 January 1711. In most of Europe (though not Russia or Greece) and Latin America, 24 March 1711 was followed by 25 March 1711, and 31 December 1711 was followed by 1 January 1712.
