= Arabat Spit =

Narrow spit of land of East Crimea, Ukraine

Arabat Spit: Арабатська стрілка (Ukrainian); Арабатская стрелка (Russian); Arabat beli (Crimean Tatar)
- Spit
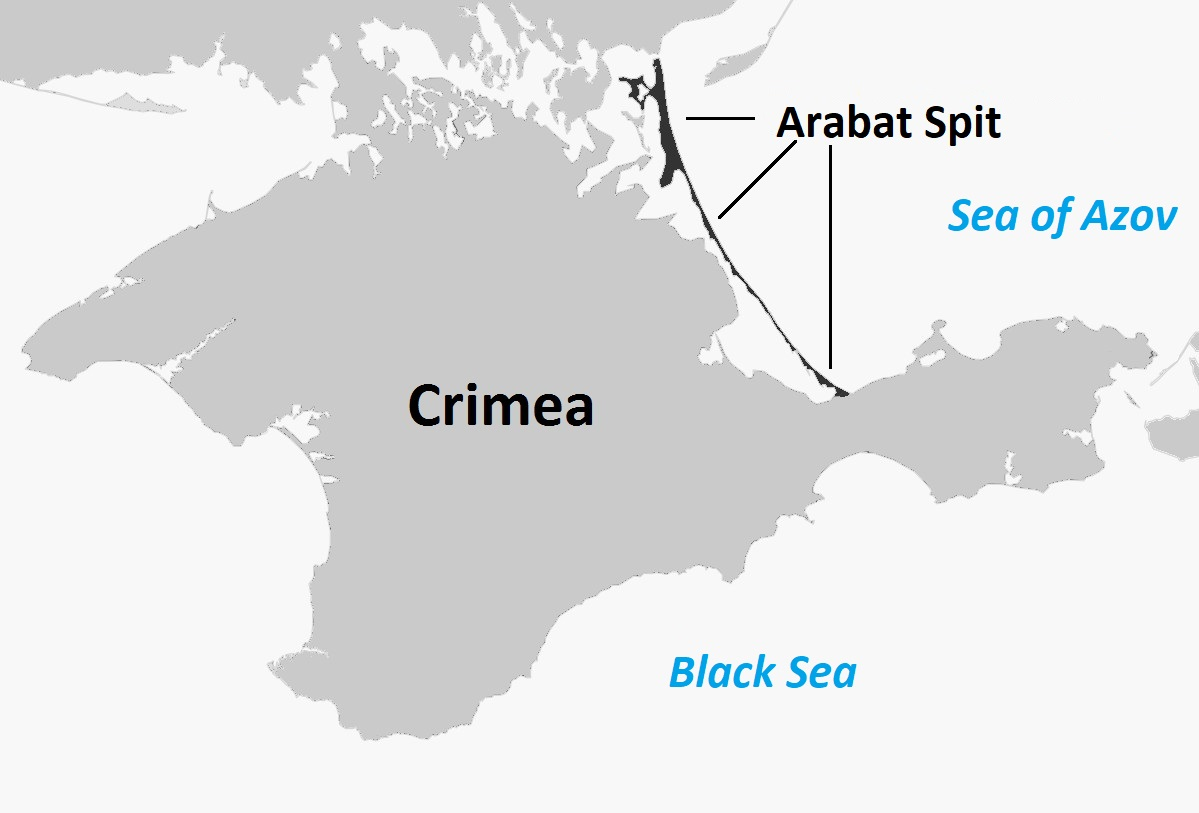

- Interactive map of Arabat Spit
- Coordinates: 45°42′N 35°00′E
- Location: Henichesk Raion, Autonomous Republic of Crimea, Ukraine/Russian Federation (disputed (Note: The status of the Crimea and of the city of Sevastopol is currently under dispute between Russia and Ukraine; Ukraine and the majority of the international community consider the Crimea to be an autonomous republic of Ukraine and Sevastopol to be one of Ukraine's cities with special status, while Russia, on the other hand, considers the Crimea to be a federal subject of Russia and Sevastopol to be one of Russia's three federal cities since the March 2014 annexation of Crimea by Russia.))

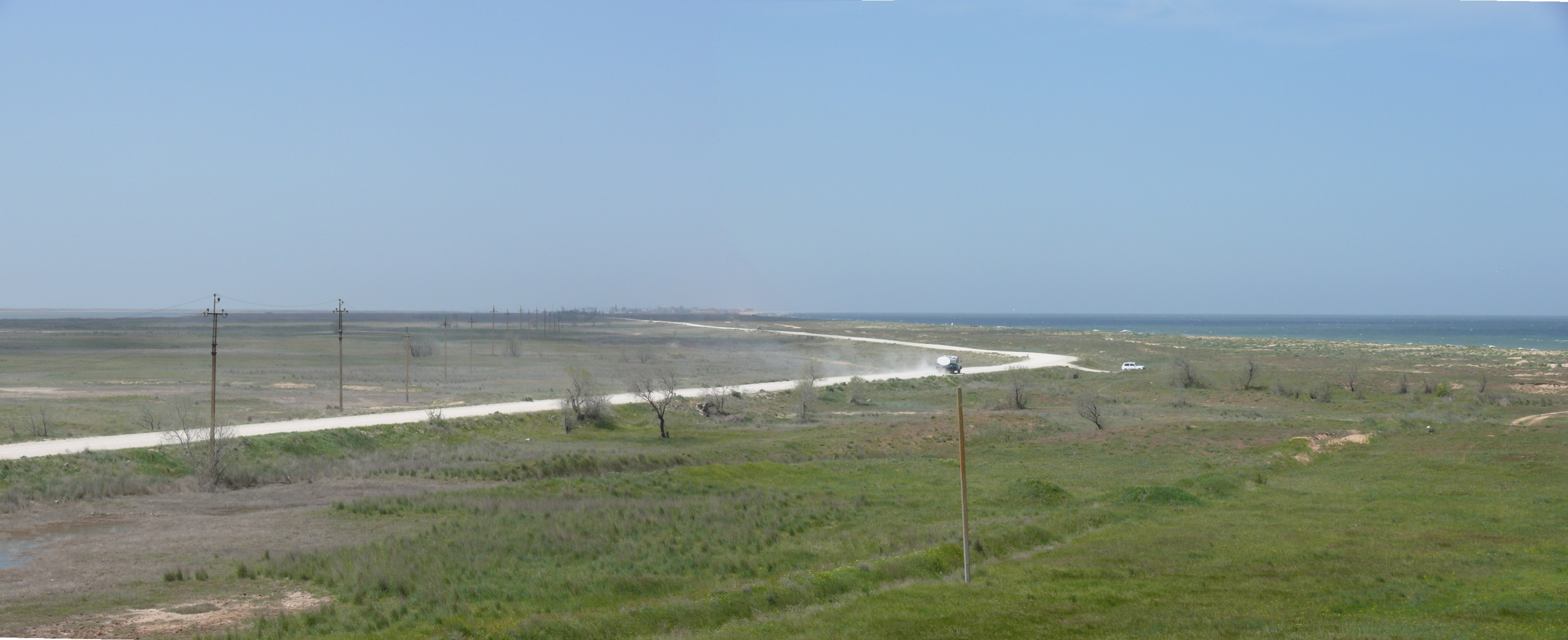
The southern part of the spit viewed from Arabat Fortress

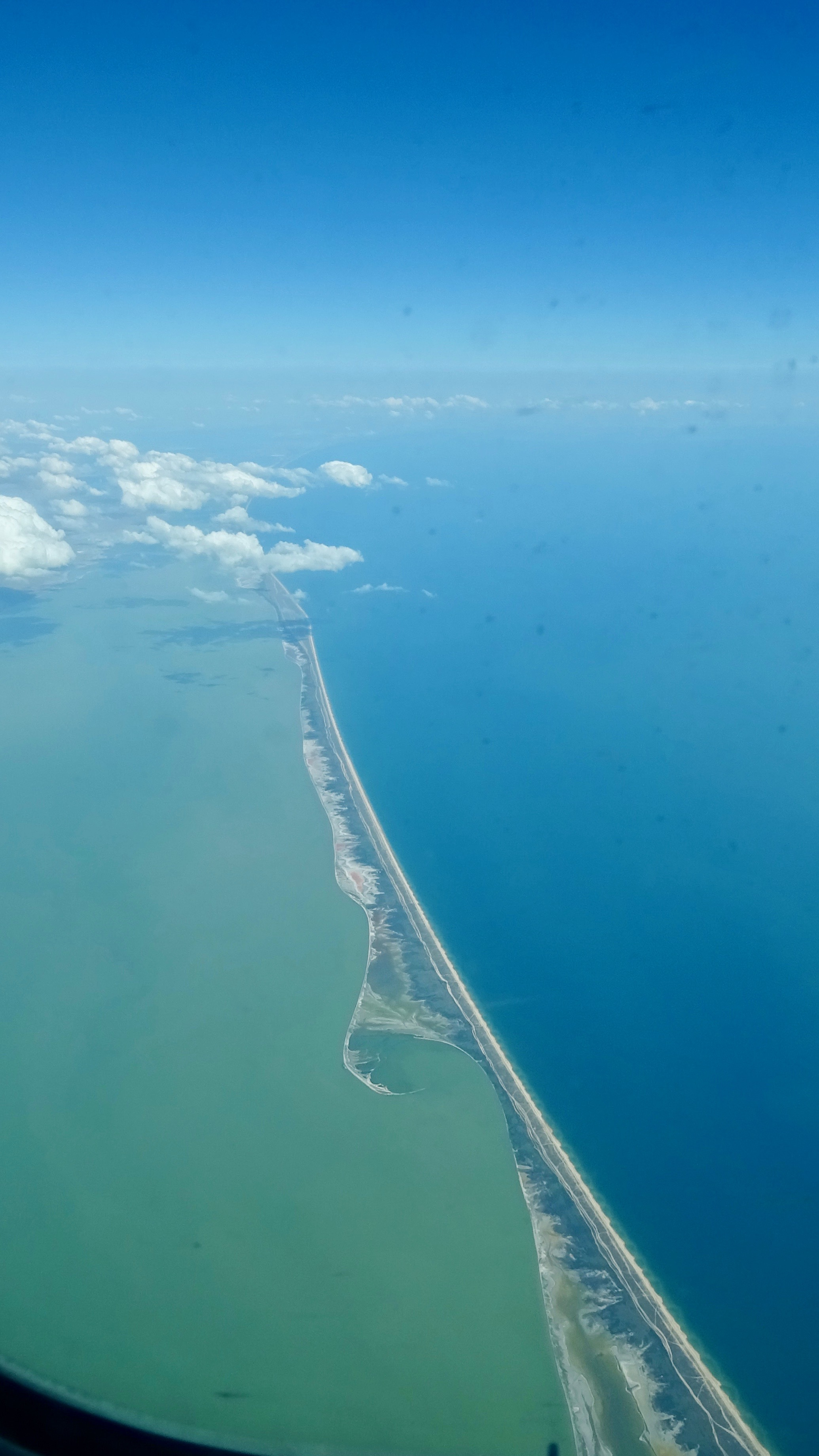
Aerial view of the spit between the Syvash lagoons (left) and Sea of Azov (right)

The Arabat Spit (Ukrainian: Арабатська коса; Russian: Арабатская коса; Crimean Tatar: Arabat beli), or Arabat Arrow (Russian: Арабатская стрелка), is a barrier spit that separates the large, shallow, salty Syvash lagoons from the Sea of Azov. The spit runs between the Henichesk Strait in the north and the north-eastern shores of Crimea in the south. It is the largest of several spits of the Sea of Azov.

== Name ==
The spit is commonly called the Arabat Arrow (Ukrainian: Арабатська стрілка, Arabatska strilka; Crimean Tatar: Arabat beli; Russian: Арабатская стрелка, Arabatskaya strelka) in Russia and Ukraine. It has been called an "arrow" since at least the middle of the 19th century.

The Arabat part of the name comes from the Arabat Fortress, a 17th-century Turkish fort at the southern end of the spit. "Arabat" derives from either Arabic "rabat" meaning a "military post" or Arabic "rabad" meaning a "suburb".

== Geography and geology ==
The Arabat Arrow is 112 km (70 mi) long, and from 0.270 to 8 km (0.17 to 5.0 mi) wide. Its surface area is 395 km^{2} (153 sq mi) and thus the average width is 3.5 km (2.2 mi). The spit is low and straight on the Azov Sea side, whereas its Sivash side is more convoluted. It contains two areas which are 7–8 km (4–5 mi) wide and have brown-clay hills. They are located 7.5 km (4.7 mi) and 32 km (20 mi) from the Henichesk Strait.

The top layers of other parts of the spit are formed by sand and shells washed by the flows of the Azov Sea. Its vegetation mostly consists of various weed grasses, thorn, festuce grasses, spear grass, crambe, salsola, salicornia, Carex colchica, tamarisk, rose hip, liquorice, etc.

Offshore water is shallow with the depth reaching 2 m (7 ft) only some 100–200 m (330–660 ft) from the shore. Its temperature is around 0 °C (32 °F) in winter (near freezing), 10–15 °C (50–59 °F) in spring and autumn, and 25–30 °C (77–86 °F) in summer; air temperature is almost the same.

The spit is very young and was created by sedimentation processes around 1100–1200 AD.

The Arabat Reserve is located in the southern part of the spit and the adjacent area of Crimea, together with the adjacent aquatory.

== History ==
The Arabat Arrow was wild until 1835 when a road and five stations at 25–30 km (16–19 mi) intervals were built along it for postal delivery. Later in the 19th century, 25 rural and 3 military settlements and one village named Arabat appeared on the spit. The rural population amounted to some 235 people whose occupation was mostly fishing, farming, and salt production. The latter activity is traditional for the region due to the vast areas of shallow and very saline water in the Sivash lagoons. Salt production in the 19th century was about 24,000 tonnes per year (26,000 short tons per year) on the Arabat Arrow alone.

During the deportation of Crimean Tatars on May 18, 1944, most of the Tatars were forcibly transported from Crimea to Central Asia in freight wagons. The Soviet authorities tried to drown the Crimean Tatars from the Arabat spit in the sea on a barge, and those who tried to swim ashore were shot.

Nowadays, the spit is a health resort and its Azov Sea side is used as a beach.

While the spit is geophysically part of the Crimean Peninsula, politically its northern half belongs to Kherson Oblast, Ukraine, while its southern portion is located within the boundaries of the Autonomous Republic of Crimea, a territory internationally recognized as part of Ukraine. Since 2014, Russia has administered the peninsula as part of the Republic of Crimea. The entirety of the spit was occupied during Russia's annexation, although Russia withdrew its forces from the northern Kherson side in December 2014. The entire spit came under Russian control on 25 February 2022, one day after Russia launched its full-scale invasion of Ukraine.

== Populated places ==
The rural communities of Henicheska Hirka, Shchaslyvtseve and Strilkove are located in the northern section of the spit, within the Kherson Oblast. The village of Soliane is located in the southern part of the spit, administered as part of the Republic of Crimea.

== Tourism ==
Arabat Spit is a popular place for summer vacation among Ukrainians because of the warm water of the Sea of Azov. There are a variety of hotels and guesthouses on the first line of the sea. Arabat Spit is popular among kitesurfers and windsurfers.

== See also ==
- Bay of Arabat
- Barrier island
- List of spits of Ukraine

== Bibliography ==
- Semenov, Petr Petrovich (1862). Geografichesko-statisticheskìĭ slovar' Rossìĭskoĭ imperìi [Geographical-statistical dictionary of Russian Empire] (in Russian). Oxford University.
- Shutov, Yu. "Арабатская стрелка" (in Russian) Tavria, 1983
