= Henicheska Hirka =

Rural locality in Kherson Oblast, Ukraine

Henicheska Hirka Генічеська Гірка
- Village
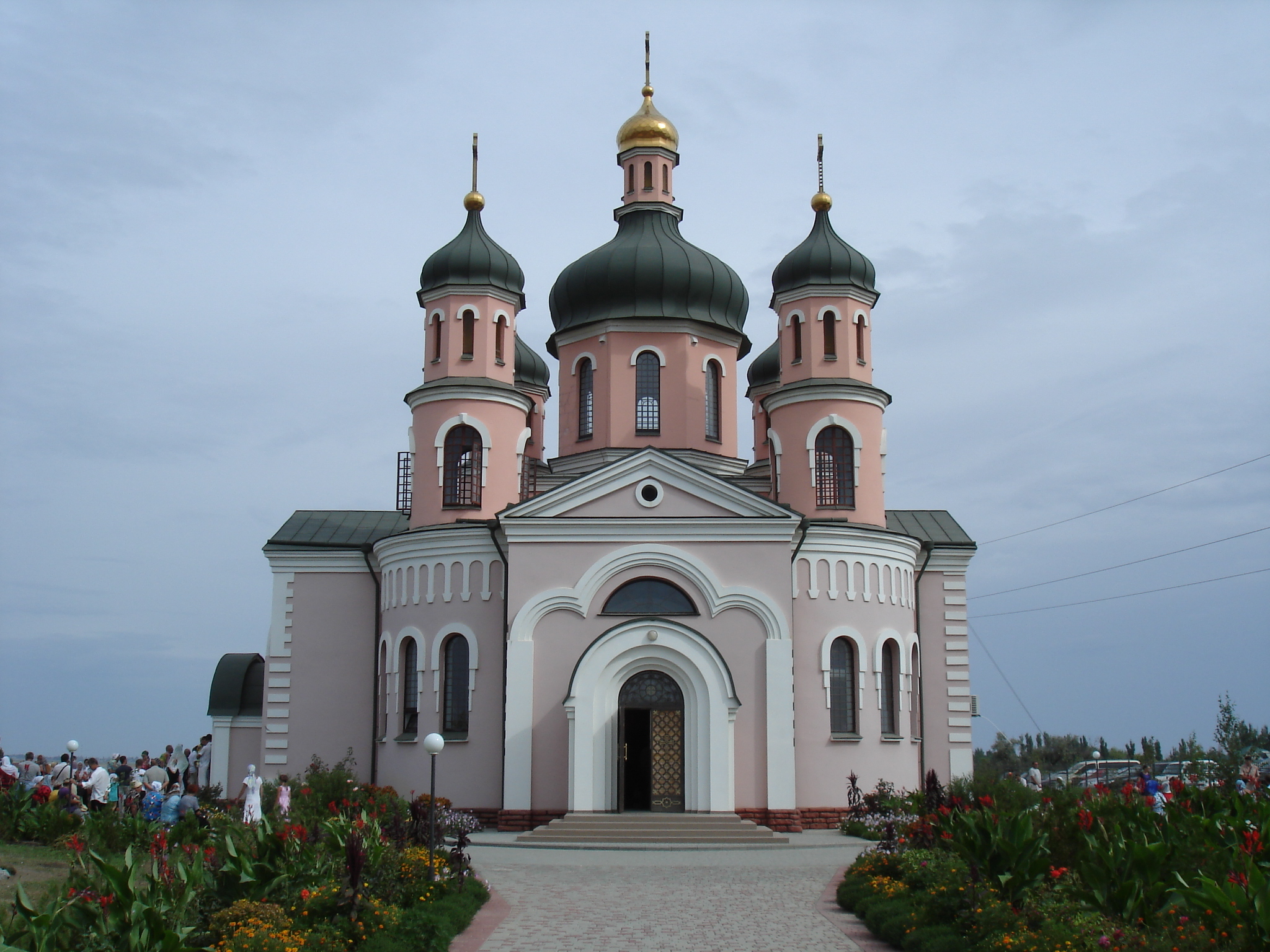
- Saint George Orthodox Church
- Interactive map of Henicheska Hirka
- Location within Crimea Location within Kherson Oblast Location within Ukraine
- Coordinates: 46°6′2″N 34°49′48″E
- Country: Ukraine
- Oblast: Kherson Oblast
- Raion: Henichesk Raion
- Hromada: Henichesk urban hromada

Population (2004)
  - Total: 495

Henicheska Hirka (Ukrainian: Генічеська Гірка) is a village located in the Arabat Spit, in the Henichesk Raion of the Kherson Oblast, Ukraine. It belongs to Henichesk urban hromada, one of the hromadas of Ukraine. Henicheska Hirka has a population of 495 inhabitants.

== Geography ==
The village is located on the Arabat Spit, 5 km south of Henichesk and 3 km north of the village of Shchaslyvtseve.

== History ==
At least 3 villagers died during the Holodomor of 1932-1933 organized by the Soviet authorities.

On June 12, 2020, according to the Order of the Cabinet of Ministers of Ukraine No. 726-r "On the determination of administrative centers and approval of territories of territorial communities of the Kherson Oblast", it became part of the Henichesk urban hromada.

On July 17, 2020, as a result of the administrative-territorial reform and liquidation of the former Henichesk Raion, it became part of the newly formed Henichesk Raion.

On February 24, 2022, the village was temporarily occupied by Russian troops during the Russian-Ukrainian war.

== Monuments ==
There is a Church of St. George the Victorious, which was built in 2009 on the patronage of the family of businessman Astafurov Valentin Mikhailovich, a native of Henichesk, and consecrated by Bishop Joasaph of the Diocese of Nova Kakhovka on the feast of the Holy Kazan Icon of the Mother of God. It is located in the highest point of the village, and next to it is the memorial complex for the defenders of the Arabat Spit during World War II. In October 2016 the church underwent repair, particularly of its external walls which were re-painted from cream to a dark blood-red in reference to the ongoing situation in Ukraine.
