= Strilkove =

Rural locality in Kherson Oblast, Ukraine

Strilkove Стрілкове
- Village
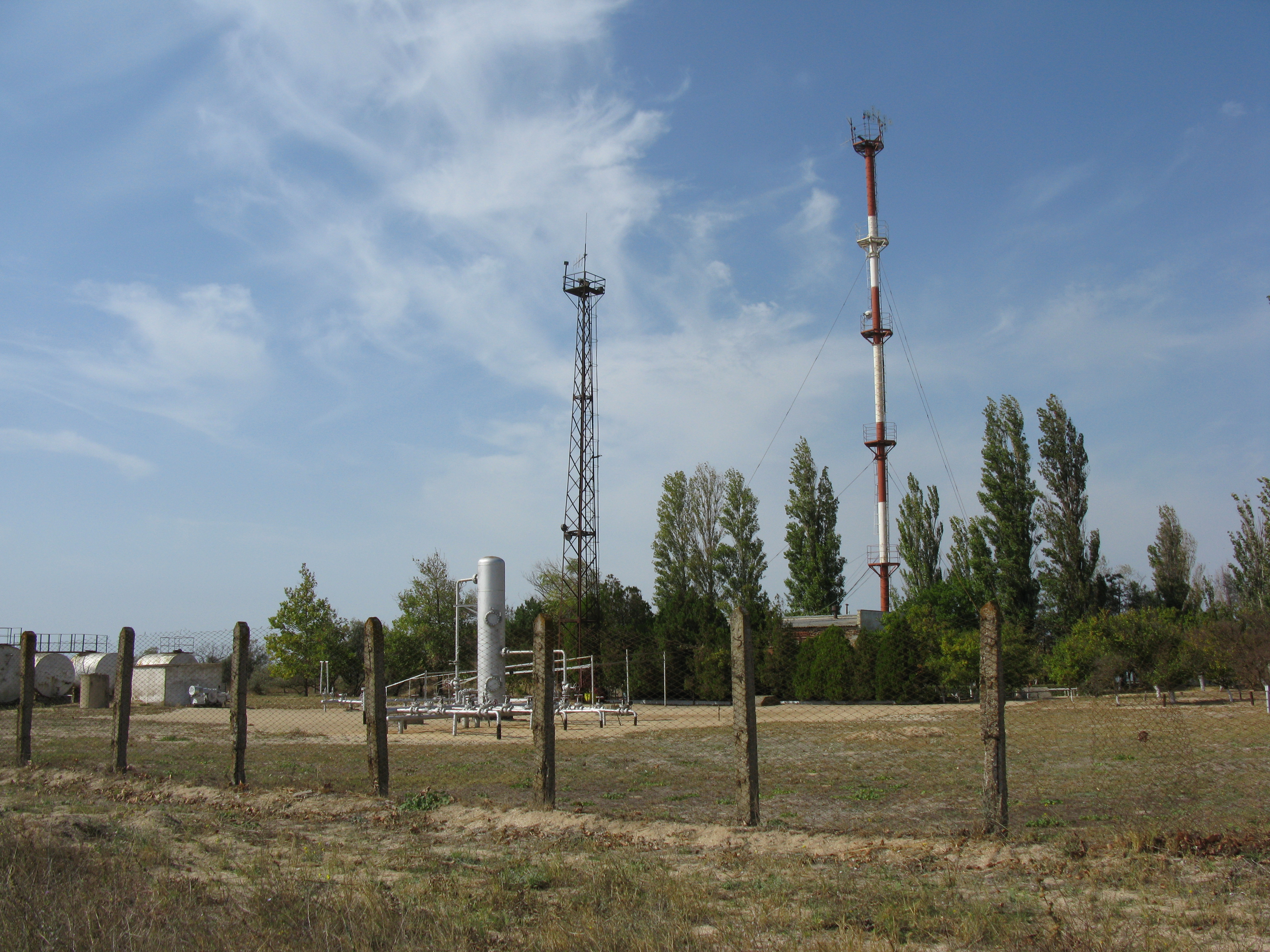
- Compressor station of Strilkove
- Interactive map of Strilkove
- Map of Kherson Oblast with Strilkove highlighted Strilkove (Kherson Oblast) Strilkove (Ukraine)
- Coordinates: 45°53′47″N 34°52′52″E
- Country: Ukraine
- Oblast: Kherson Oblast
- Raion: Henichesk Raion
- Hromada: Henichesk urban hromada

Government
  - Mayor: Oleksander Petrovych Ponomarov

Area
  - Total: 2.05923 km^{2} (0.79507 sq mi)
- Elevation: 2 m (6.6 ft)

Population (2013)
  - Total: 1,415
  - Density: 6.66/km^{2} (17.2/sq mi)
- Time zone: UTC+2 (EET)
  - Summer (DST): UTC+3 (EEST)
- Postal code: 75583
- Area code: (+380) 5534

Strilkove (Ukrainian: Стрілкове; Russian: Стрелковое; Crimean Tatar: Çoqraq) is a Ukrainian village in Henichesk urban hromada, Henichesk Raion, Kherson Oblast. In 2013 its population was 1,415.

The village is located on the Arabat Spit and is geographically part of Crimea, however it falls under the administration of Kherson Oblast. It was partially and temporarily occupied by Russian forces during the 2014 Russian military intervention in Ukraine, the first time Russian troops moved into the Kherson Oblast. It was reoccupied by Russian forces at the onset of the 2022 Russian invasion of Ukraine.

== Geography ==
The village lies on the northern portion of Crimean peninsula's Arabat Spit, though neither Strilkove nor the neighboring village of Shchaslyvtseve are claimed as part of the Crimean Autonomous Republic. It is located 8 kilometers to the north of the border of the Crimean Republic, between the Azov Sea to the east, and Lake Sivash in the west; and is 32 km south from the town of Henichesk.

== History ==
Strilkove was founded under the Russian Empire in 1835 and, until 1945, was named Çoqraq or Chokrak (Чокрак).

=== Deportation of 1944 ===
In 1944, unlike other Crimean Tatars, inhabitants of Çoqraq were not deported to Middle Asia. The reason is unknown, but there is a popular thought that the village was simply forgotten. However, in June 1945 the whole village population (including people of Slav origin) were put on a barge which was later sunk in Azov sea. "However, in June 1945, the authorities drew attention to this 'flaw' (and Stalin had already been informed about the complete 'purification' of the peninsula), so the villagers (mostly Crimean Tatars, but also some Ukrainians) were loaded onto a barge and taken to the Sea of Azov, where in the middle of the sea the barge was flooded along with all the people... 413 soldiers and commanders received combat orders and medals for the deportation of Crimean Tatars."

=== Russian annexation of Crimea ===
During the Russian occupation of Crimea, on 15 March 2014 at about 13:30, Russian Airborne Troops (40 riflemen) advanced on the village. The village is located on the Arabat Spit and is geographically a part of Crimea, however administratively it is in the Kherson Oblast. This marked the first time Russian forces advanced into mainland Ukraine as prior to this Russian troops operated only within the Autonomous Republic of Crimea. The soldiers stated that they missed their landing zone and landed in the village by accident. Also for the first time during the conflict, Ukraine placed its air forces on alert and air lifted its own unit of paratroopers to the area. In response, Russian forces retreated from the center of the village to a nearby gas distribution terminal, claiming that they believed it may be vulnerable to a terrorist attack and needed to be secured.

As of October 2014, Ukrainian border guards and a volunteer territorial defense battalion were stationed in the village. Russian forces maintained a company of 150 troops nearby which were also supported by a gunboat. The area did not experience any fighting after the Russian takeover of the offshore gas platforms near the village. However, the border guards were instructed to not allow people whose Russian passport had been issued in Crimea to pass, as well as to inspect vehicles for possible Russian contraband. The small force deployed to the village was also designated to slow any potential advance of Russian troops deeper into Kherson, while a larger contingent of Ukrainian forces was stationed at Novooleksiivka and Henichesk, about 20 miles north along the Arabat Spit.

On 9 December 2014, the Ukrainian border guards reported that Russian troops had begun withdrawing from southern Kherson Oblast, ending the 9-month-long occupation. Despite their withdrawal from the mainland, Russian troops still occupied the gas distribution center outside the village. The Arabat Spit and the Syvash areas were the sole remaining territories of the Crimean Peninsula that remained under direct Ukrainian control.

=== Russo-Ukrainian War ===
Strilkove was captured by Russian ground forces on the first day of the Russian Invasion of Ukraine when they crossed the nearby border of the Russian-occupied Autonomous Republic of Crimea, which fell under Russian military control in early 2014. The invasion was the result of the escalating Russo-Ukrainian War. On 4 July 2025, Ukrainian partisans killed three Russian servicemen in a car bombing in the village. On 1 February 2026, Ukrainian partisans claimed responsibility for blowing up a transformer cabinet of a radio tower near the settlement.

== Demographics ==
As of the 2001 Ukrainian census, Strilkove had a population of 1,372 inhabitants. The distribution of the population by their first languages was as follows:

First languages in Strilkove
	percent
Russian	67.2%
Ukrainian	26.2%
Crimean Tatar	2.6%
Belarusian	0.4%
Armenian	0.1%
Romanian	0.1%
others	3.4%

== Gallery ==
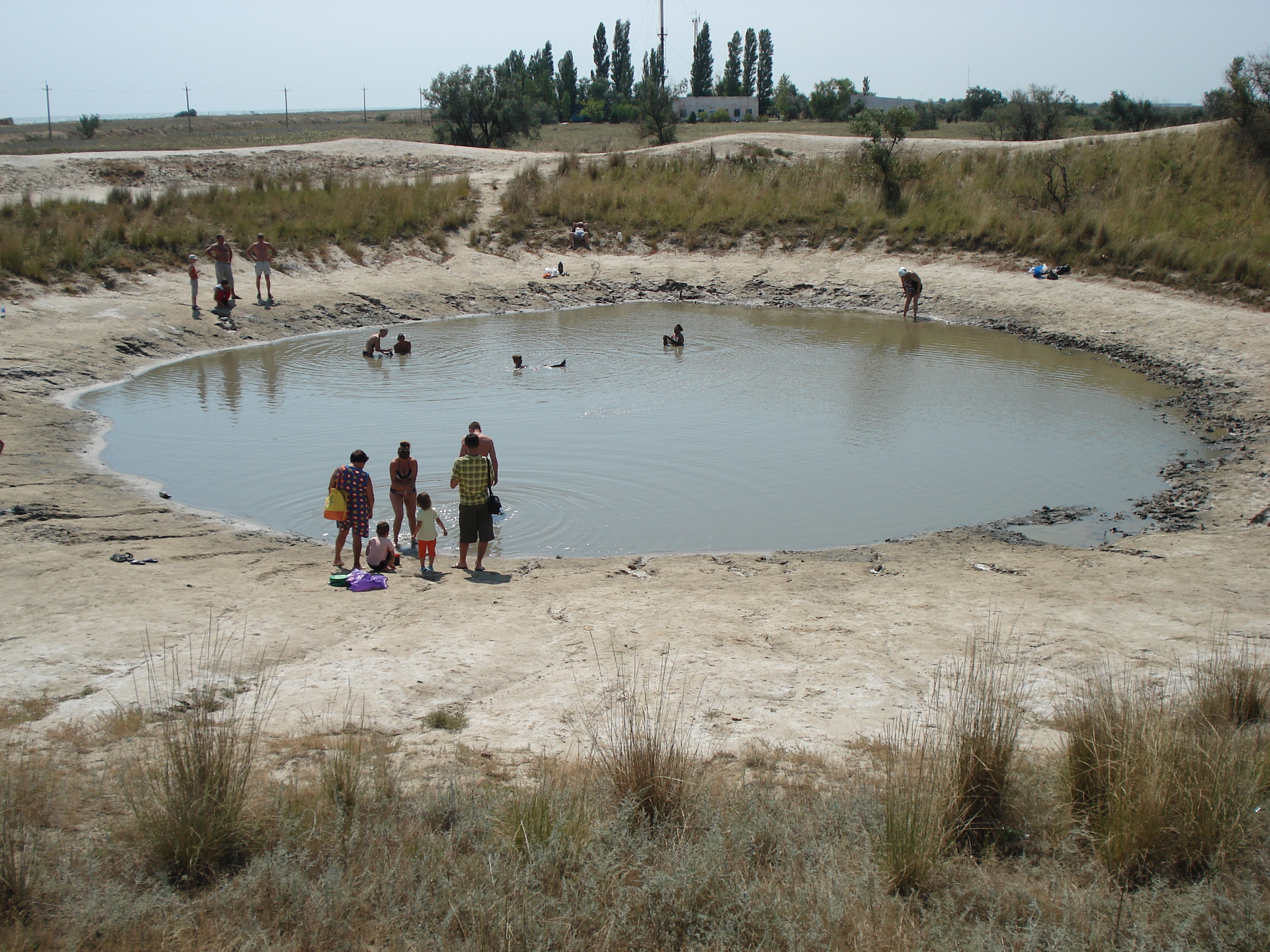
"Kolizey" radon source

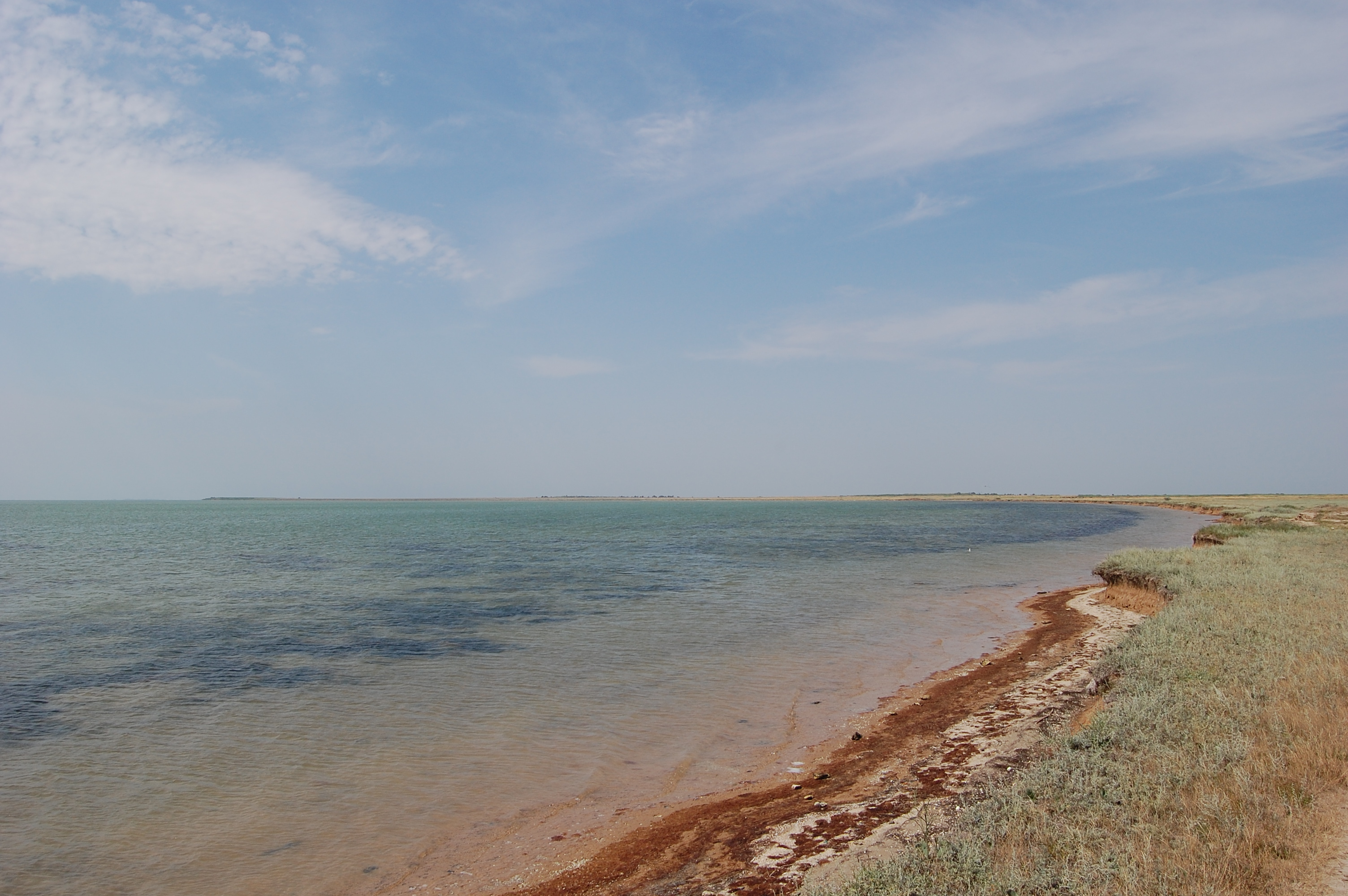
A beach by the Syvash

== See also ==
- Chongar
