= Olonetskaya shipyard =

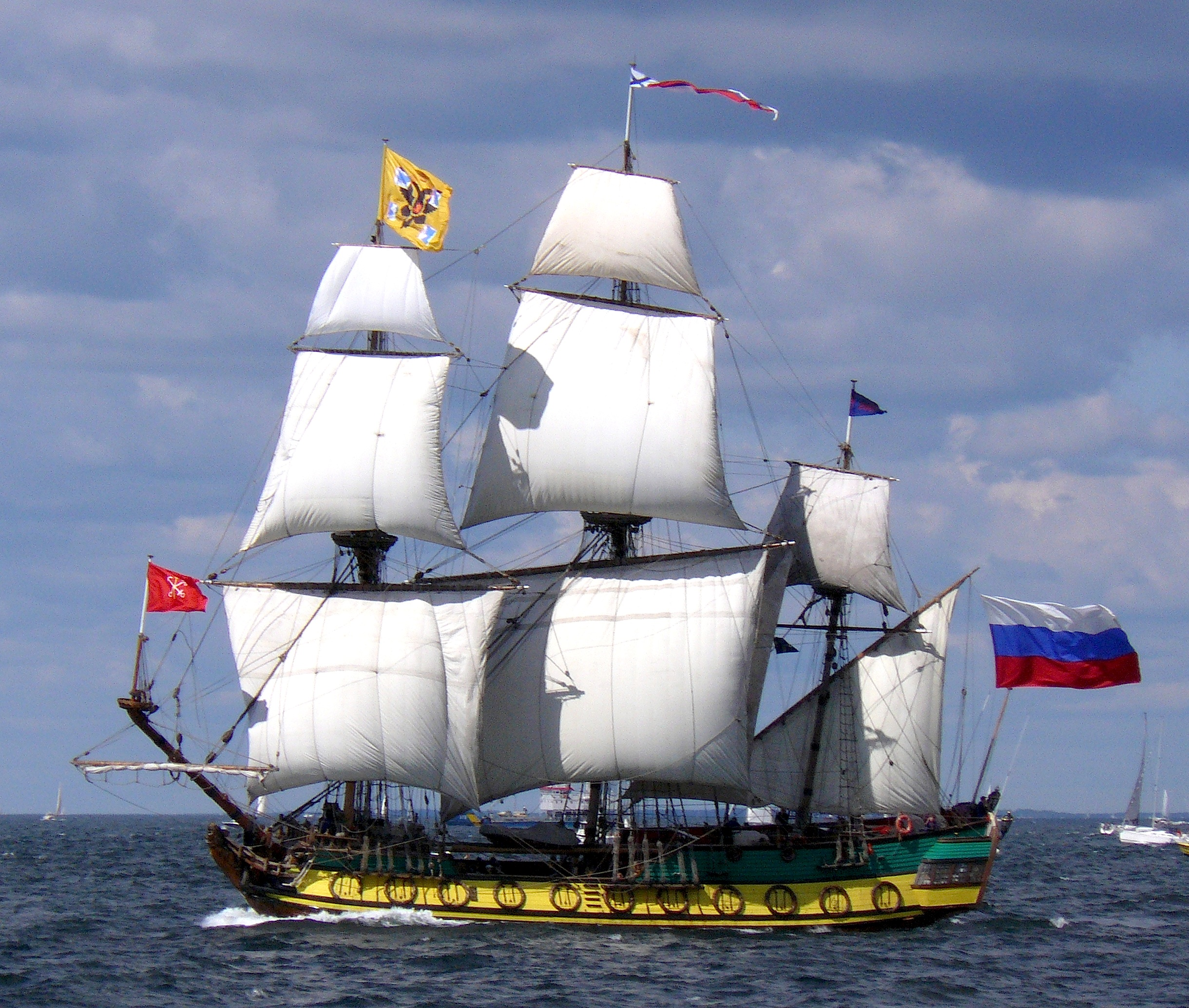
Russian frigate Shtandart

Olonetskaya shipyard (Russian: Олонецкая верфь), also known as Svirskaya (from 1785 - Lodeynopolskaya) is a shipbuilding enterprise that operated in 1702–1829 in Lodeynoye Pole in Olonetsky Uyezd of the Russian Empire.

== History ==
Construction of the shipyard began in 1702 by decree of Peter the Great under the leadership of Count Alexander Danilovich Menshikov near the villages of Meshkovichi and Mokrishvitsy of the old Pirkinsky cenetry on the Svir River, on the eastern shore of Lake Ladoga, due to the need for naval vessels for combat purposes of the Great Northern War.

Bombardier Ivan Yakovlevich Yakovlev was appointed the first commandant of the shipyard, who arrived in Olonets in February 1703. On March 24, 1703, Olonets shipyard was opened.

On August 22, 1703, the first rank ship of the Baltic Fleet, the 28-gun frigate Standart, left the shipyard slipway.

Until 1724 the shipyard also built a considerable number of small ships and vessels - from bombardier ships to dinghies - more than 800 in total. After the end of the Northern War, large-scale shipbuilding at the Olonets shipyard gradually faded away.

== See also ==
- Petrozavod
- Åbo Skeppswarf
