= Shchaslyvtseve =

Rural locality in Kherson Oblast, Ukraine

Shchaslyvtseve Щасливцеве (Ukrainian) Счастливцево (Russian) Şçaslıvtseve (Krymchak) Şçaslıvtseve (Crimean Tatar)
- Village
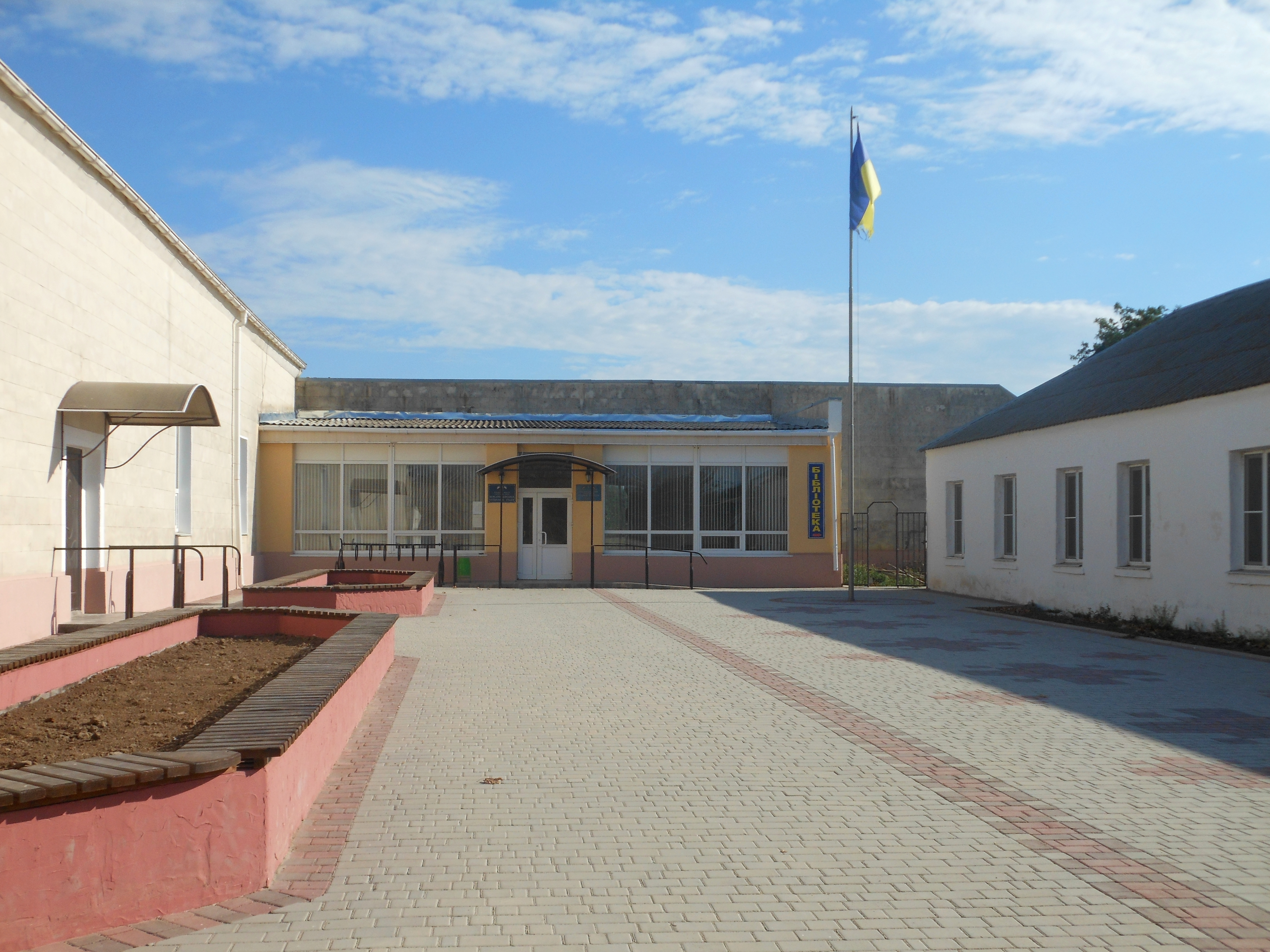
- The Shchaslyvtseve Village Council building in 2016
- Interactive map of Shchaslyvtseve
- Location within Crimea Location within Kherson Oblast Location within Ukraine
- Country: Ukraine
- Oblast: Kherson Oblast
- Raion: Henichesk Raion

Shchaslyvtseve (Ukrainian: Щасливцеве; Russian: Счастливцево; Crimean Tatar: Şçaslıvtseve; Krymchak: Şçaslıvtseve) is a village in southern Ukraine. The community is located on the Arabat Spit and is geographically in Crimea, but administered as part of Henichesk Raion, Kherson Oblast. It belongs to Henichesk urban hromada, one of the hromadas of Ukraine.

Shchaslyvtseve is about 15 km south of Henichesk, administrative center of the district within which Shchaslyvtseve is located. Its position on the spit gives it easy access to the Sea of Azov.

== History ==
There was at least some ancient history on the land of the modern-day village, as there is a mound that is about 4 m high from the Early Bronze Age that was used as a burial site from the 4th millennium BC to the 15th-17th century AD located in the village. There is a catacomb burial belonging to people near the Inhulets river, and in the burial was a polished stone hammer, a staff with a pummel, and miniature flint arrows. Later excavations uncovered four more burials of the Babyno. Plans were made to exhibit artifacts from the mounds at the Henichesk Local History Museum.

The village was founded sometime in the nineteenth century. During the Crimean War, General Schastlivtsev of the Russian Army was deployed on the Arabat Spit to protect the Black Sea coast. His units arranged a small hamlet named after him during the war, which is the first referred to instance of the village of Shchaslyvtseve. During the late 1800s, more immigrants came from neighboring provinces. After it was occupied by the Soviet Union, the Arabatskiyi state farm was operated in the village.

Shchaslyvtseve was captured by Russian ground forces on the first day of the Russian invasion phase of the Russo-Ukrainian War when they crossed the nearby border of the previously Russian-occupied Autonomous Republic of Crimea. Due to the Russian occupation, the village has been devoid of residents and many businesses have shut down.

The community is considered a resort village and boasts a thermal spring. Its population is about 1,500 people (it was at 1,463 during the 2001 Ukrainian census).
