= Anna Catharina =

Dutch ship (1728–1735)

History

Dutch Republic
- Name: Anna Catharina
- Owner: Dutch East India Company; Chamber of Zeeland
- Completed: 1728
- Fate: Wrecked at the Scheldt estuary on 3 February 1735

General characteristics
- Type: East Indiaman
- Length: 130 feet
- Sail plan: 3 masts
- Capacity: 175 people and loading capacity of 600 tons

Anna Catharina was an 18th-century East Indiaman or "mirror return ship" (Dutch: spiegelretourschip) of the Dutch East India Company.

During her third voyage to Batavia, she wrecked at the Scheldt estuary, Dutch Republic, on 3 February 1735. All 175 people on board drowned.

== Ship details ==
Anna Catharina was built in 1728 in Middelburg for the Chamber of Zeeland. She was 130 feet long and had a loading capacity of 600 tons. She was a wooden full-rigged ship with 3 masts.

== History and fate ==
After two voyages to Batavia, in January 1736 she went for her third voyage to Batavia under command of Jacob de Prinse with 175 soldiers and passengers. The ship was heavily loaded. She was accompanied by her bigger sister ship 't Vliegend Hert commanded by captain Cornelis van der Horst. The ships transported a cargo of wood, building materials, iron, gunpowder and wine, as well as several chests with gold and silver coins.

Due to the bad weather the ships waited at Fort Rammekens. On 3 February 1735 at around noon the ships continued their journey, accompanied by the Mercurius with a maritime pilot onboard, to guide them through the North Sea and the Channel. Due to the strong easterly wind, the water level was lower than expected. The wind caused that the ships reached the shallowest part too early. Around 6 pm both ships stranded in the Scheldt estuary on the sandbanks around Duerloo Channel. Anna Catharina sank with all hands within two hours. 't Vliegend Hert wrecked several kilometers further away.

Both ships had fired emergency shots. Mercurius was only half a mile behind them, but the boat could not get closer to the ships and save the crew due to the high seas.

== Aftermath ==
Shortly after the disaster the Chamber of Zeeland informed the other Chambers and took measures to prevent that cargo would be stolen. As four English ships were observed fishing for the wrecks, a vessel was used to prevent other ships from diving to the wrecks.

The VOC sent an accountant to the site of the stranding to claim the goods and to ask help from the beach finders. The government supported the VOC with a beachcomber. In the days after the disaster, barrels with jenever, beer and oil washed ashore on the beaches of Blankenberge and Nieuwpoort. Parts of the wrecks washed ashore or were fished up, and were subsequently brought to the beachcombers in accordance with regulations. For example, the accountant received goods from various fishermen and it was registered where it was found. A map was subsequently created by the mapmaker of the Chamber of Zeeland Abraham Anias (1694–1750) with the locations of the wrecks and information about the sea depth of the area.

== Investigation ==
The skipper of Mercurius blamed the maritime pilot. Also the crew members of Mercurius shared this opinion and showed dissatisfaction with the policy of the maritime pilot. Ultimately, after the investigation the maritime pilot was fired.

The investigation continued over the years. The important question was if people of the Mercurius could and/or should have attempted to rescue the people. The investigation continued until 56 years after the disaster, but the conclusion remained the same: it was impossible.
