= Huis te Warmelo =

Dutch frigate

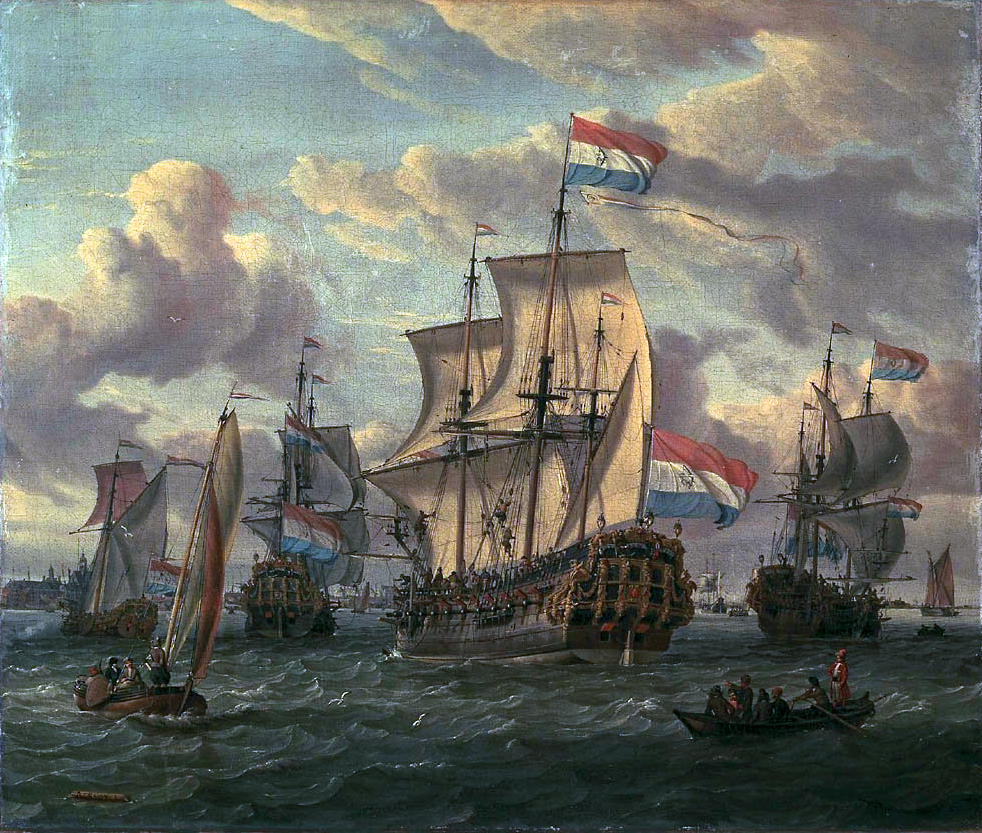
- A Dutch Frigate from the late 17th century.

History
- Name: Huis te Warmelo
- Owner: Admiralty of the Noorderkwartier
- Operator: Dutch States Navy
- Port of registry: Medemblik, Dutch Republic
- Builder: Blauwevlag, Cornelis Willemszoon
- In service: 1708
- Out of service: 25 August 1715
- Fate: Struck rocks and sank

General characteristics
- Class & type: fourth rate frigate
- Type: Sailing ship
- Length: 38.1 metres (125 ft 0 in)
- Beam: 10.8 metres (35 ft 5 in)
- Depth: 4.7 metres (15 ft 5 in)
- Crew: 130
- Armament: 40-44 Cannons

Huis te Warmelo ("House of Warmelo") was a frigate of the Dutch States Navy that struck rocks and sank in the Gulf of Finland near the Kalbådagrund shoal off the coast of Porvoo, Finland with the loss of all 130 crew on board.

== Construction ==
Huis te Warmelo was built in Medemblik by Blauwevlag, Cornelis Willemszoon in 1708 as a frigate for the Admiralty of the Noorderkwartier. It was equipped with 3 masts and 40-44 cannons. The ship was 38.1 metres (125 ft 0 in) long, with a beam of 10.8 metres (35 ft 5 in) and a depth of 4.7 metres (15 ft 5 in).

== Sinking ==
On 25 August 1715 Huis te Warmelo was on a voyage with 130 crew on board and equipped with 40-44 cannons, when it struck the submerged rocks in the Gulf of Finland near the Kalbådagrund shoal off the coast of Porvoo, Finland and was taking on water rapidly before it sank when it reached deeper waters. All 130 crew members lost their lives in the disaster and the Dutch navy marked a cross on a map on the location of the sinking with the inscription: Hier is het Noord-Hollands oorlogschip op gebleven 1715 ("Here is where the North-Hollands war ship stayed 1715").

== Wreck ==
The wreck was discovered at a depth of 62 metres (203 ft 5 in) by the Finnish Navy in 2005. It was in a perfect state and laid upright on the sea floor. Even a part of one of the 3 masts was still standing and some cannons were still in position on the wooden deck. The wreck is so well preserved because of the environment with mainly the low salinity, cold temperatures and little oxygen in the water at this depth playing a part in making sure the wooden hull of the ship stayed in good condition.

The ship was only identified in 2015 after a historian found the map on which the Dutch navy had marked the wreck site and it was discovered that only one Dutch war ship had sunk that year, the Huis te Warmelo. The ship hit media attention in March 2016 when it was revealed that the unknown ship had a name and in what condition it was found in. She is the best preserved Dutch Navy ship found to this day and further investigation will be done on the wreck.
