= List of shipwrecks in the 1720s =

The List of shipwrecks in the 1720s includes some ships sunk, wrecked or otherwise lost during the 1720s.

== 1720 ==
In the British Empire, 1720 began on 25 March 25 rather than on 1 January. Thus, the day before "25 March 1720" O.S. (old style) was "24 March 1719" (O.S.). ^{[Note 1]} In most of continental Europe, the Gregorian calendar had already been adopted and the year began on 1 January 1720. In addition, the "old style" Julian Calendar was 13 days behind the "new style" Gregorian calendar, so the day recorded as 1 January 1719 "old style" in the British press is now considered 14 January 1720.

=== September ===
==== 26 September ====
List of shipwrecks: 26 September 1720
Ship	State	Description
Grand-Saint-Antoine	France	Great Plague of Marseille: The plague-infested ship was burnt at Jarre Island, Bouches-du-Rhône by order of the Regent of Marseille. She was on a voyage from Sidon, Smyrna and Cyprus to Marseille.

=== November ===
==== 24 November ====
List of shipwrecks: 24 November 1720
Ship	State	Description
HMS Monck	(Kingdom of Great Britain) Royal Navy	The third rate frigate foundered in the North Sea off Great Yarmouth, Norfolk.

== 1721 ==
=== January ===
==== Unknown date ====
List of shipwrecks: January 1721
Ship	State	Description
Africain	France	The transport ship, a full-rigged ship, ran aground in the Loire River and was wrecked. She was on a voyage from Saint-Domingue to Nantes, Loire-Atlantique.

=== November ===
==== 10 November ====
List of shipwrecks: 10 November 1721
Ship	State	Description
HMS Royal Anne Galley	(Kingdom of Great Britain) Royal Navy	The fifth rate galley-frigate was wrecked on the Stags Rocks, in the English Channel off The Lizard, Cornwall, with the loss of all but three of the approximately 200 people on board.

==== 12 November ====
List of shipwrecks: 12 November 1721
Ship	State	Description
Nishtadt (Ништадт, 'Nystad')	Imperial Russian Navy	The ship ran aground and was wrecked off Saaremaa. Her crew were rescued. She was on a voyage from Holland to Russia.

=== December ===
==== 7 December ====
List of shipwrecks: 7 December 1721
Ship	State	Description
Hind	(Kingdom of Great Britain) Royal Navy	20-gun sixth rate launched in 1711 and wrecked in 1721. The ship struck a rock "half a musket shot" off Castle Cornet, Guernsey, Channel Islands, on 7 December 1721, and 21 hands were lost including the Captain Fuzzard. The loss was attributed to the "ignorance of the pilot". 94 of the ship's company were saved. Amongst those rescued was the ship's surgeon, Mr Forkington, "who was laid up with the gout, but made shift to swim to a rock not far distant, and the cold baths that endangered his life, hath effectively cured his said distemper." The pilot was tried and found guilty, and was sentenced to three years imprisonment and loss of pay.

== 1722 ==
=== June ===
==== 16 June ====
List of shipwrecks: 16 June 1722
Ship	State	Description
Addison	British East India Company	The East Indiaman was wrecked at the Cape of Good Hope.
Chandos	British East India Company	The East Indiaman was wrecked at the Cape of Good Hope.

==== 17 June ====
List of shipwrecks: 17 June 1722
Ship	State	Description
Nightingale	British East India Company	The East Indiaman was wrecked at the Cape of Good Hope.

=== August ===
==== 24 August ====
List of shipwrecks: 24 August 1722
Ship	State	Description
Thirteen unnamed vessels	Imperial Russian Navy	Russo-Persian War (1722–1723): The ships were wrecked at Derbent.

==== Unknown date ====
List of shipwrecks: August 1722
Ship	State	Description
Valkenbos	Dutch East India Company	During her voyage to Deshima, Japan, she wrecked near the Japanese coast and sank with all hands between 14 and 18 August 1722.

=== September ===
==== Unknown date ====
List of shipwrecks: Unknown date before 4 September 1722
Ship	State	Description
25 unnamed vessels	Imperial Russian Navy	Russo-Persian War (1722–1723): The ships were driven ashore 30 versts (17 nautical miles (32 km) from Chechen Island before 4 September.

=== November ===
==== 20 November ====
List of shipwrecks: 21 November 1722
Ship	State	Description
Schoonenberg	Dutch East India Company	The East Indiaman ran aground at Cape Agulhas, Africa, at 04h00 at night through negligence of her skipper and officers. All evidence contradict allegation of deliberate beaching.

== 1724 ==
=== 18 January (N.S.) ===
List of shipwrecks: 18 January 1724
Ship	State	Description
Fortuyn	Dutch East India Company	The East Indiaman departed from Texel in the Netherlands on 27 September 1723 and reached the Cape of Good Hope on 2 January 1724 (20 December 1723 O.S.) On 18 January 1724 (dated as "5 January 1723" on the British calendar, she left for the Netherlands East Indies. No further trace, possibly wrecked on the Houtman Abrolhos archipelago.

==== Unknown date ====
List of shipwrecks: Unknown date in August 1724
Ship	State	Description
Guadaloupe	Spain	The ship was wrecked in a hurricane in Saldaná Bay, Hispaniola.
Tolosa	Spain	The ship was wrecked in a hurricane in Saldaná Bay.

=== November ===
==== 19 November ====
List of shipwrecks: 19 November 1724
Ship	State	Description
Slot ter Hooge	Dutch East India Company	The East Indiaman struck rocks and sank off Porto Santo Island, Madeira, with the loss of 221 of the 254 people on board. She was on a voyage to Batavia, Netherlands East Indies.

=== December ===
==== 21 December ====
List of shipwrecks: 21 December 1724
Ship	State	Description
Christine	France	The ship was wrecked near Les Sables-d'Olonne, Vendée with some loss of life.

== 1725 ==
=== March 1725 (N.S.) ===
==== 8 March ====
List of shipwrecks: 8 March 1725
Ship	State	Description
Akerendam	Dutch East India Company	The East Indiaman was wrecked on Runde, Norway.

=== August ===
==== 26 August ====
List of shipwrecks: 26 August 1725
Ship	State	Description
Chameau	French Navy	The transport ship, a flutte, was wrecked north of Louisbourg, Nova Scotia, with the loss of all 216 people on board. She was on a voyage from La Rochelle, Loire-Atlantique to Quebec City.

== 1726 ==
=== January 1726 (N.S.) ===
==== 3 January ====
(3 January 1726 N.S. and 20 December 1725 O.S.)

List of shipwrecks: 3 January 1726
Ship	State	Description
Aagtekerke	Dutch East India Company	The East Indiaman departed from Cape Town for Batavia, Netherlands East Indies. No further trace, presumed lost with all 200 crew. Possibly wrecked in the Houtman Abrolhos archipelago.

=== May ===
==== 8 May ====
List of shipwrecks: 8 May 1726
Ship	State	Description
Ravesteyn	Dutch East India Company	During a voyage from the Dutch Republic to China, she went off course and wrecked in the night of 8–9 May 1726 at Ari Atoll, Maldives. The wreck was discovered in 1997 and after research her final voyage was reconstructed.

=== September ===
==== 6 September ====
List of shipwrecks: 6 September 1726
Ship	State	Description
Santa Rosa	Portugal	The galleon caught fire, exploded and sank off Recife, Brazil, with the loss of all but seven of the approximately 700 people on board. She was on a voyage from Salvador to Portugal.

=== Unknown date ===
List of shipwrecks: Unknown date in 1726
Ship	State	Description
Kazan (Казань)	Imperial Russian Navy	The ship was wrecked in the Caspian Sea.
Zinzili (Зинзили)	Imperial Russian Navy	The ship was deliberately driven ashore due to a heavy leak at Bandar-e Anzali, Gilan.

== 1727 ==
=== June ===
==== 9 June ====
List of shipwrecks: 9 June 1727
Ship	State	Description
Zeewijk	Dutch East India Company	The East Indiaman ran aground and was wrecked off the Houtman Abrolhos with the loss of ten of her 208 crew. She was on her maiden voyage from Vlissingen, Zeeland, Dutch Republic, to Batavia, Netherlands East Indies. Survivors built a sloop, the Sloepie from the wreck and 82 of them reached Batavia in her.

==== 25 June ====
List of shipwrecks: 25 June 1727
Ship	State	Description
Luxborough Galley	(Kingdom of Great Britain) South Sea Company	Luxborough Galley. African slave trade: The ship was accidentally set on fire in the Atlantic Ocean and burnt down to the waterline with the eventual loss of all but eleven of her crew.

== 1728 ==
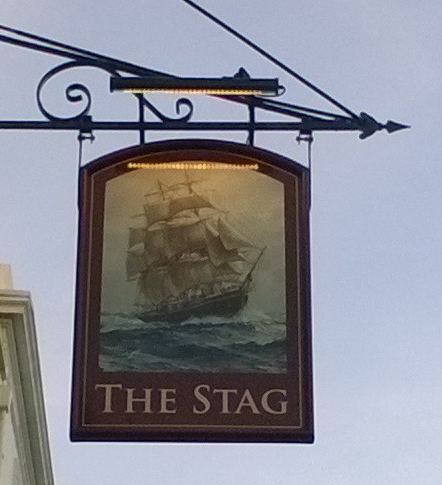
A public house sign that depicts a ship believed to be sunk in UK waters, 1720s

There is a public house in Walmer, Kent, UK, called The Stag. The building dates from 1715 and, as an inn, it was tenanted from 1733 by Nathaniel Long, also a sailmaker. The Stag is believed to have sunk near Deal in 1728 'under ill-fated circumstances'. It is possible that Long had supplied the ship at some time.

== 1729 ==
=== Unknown date ===
List of shipwrecks: 1729
Ship	State	Description
Galera Victoria	Spanish Navy	The frigate, a galleon, foundered off Gijón on her maiden voyage.

== Notes ==
1. Until 1752 in the British Empire, the year began on Lady Day (25 March) Thus 24 March 1720 was followed by 25 March 1721. 31 December 1721 was followed by 1 January 1721.
