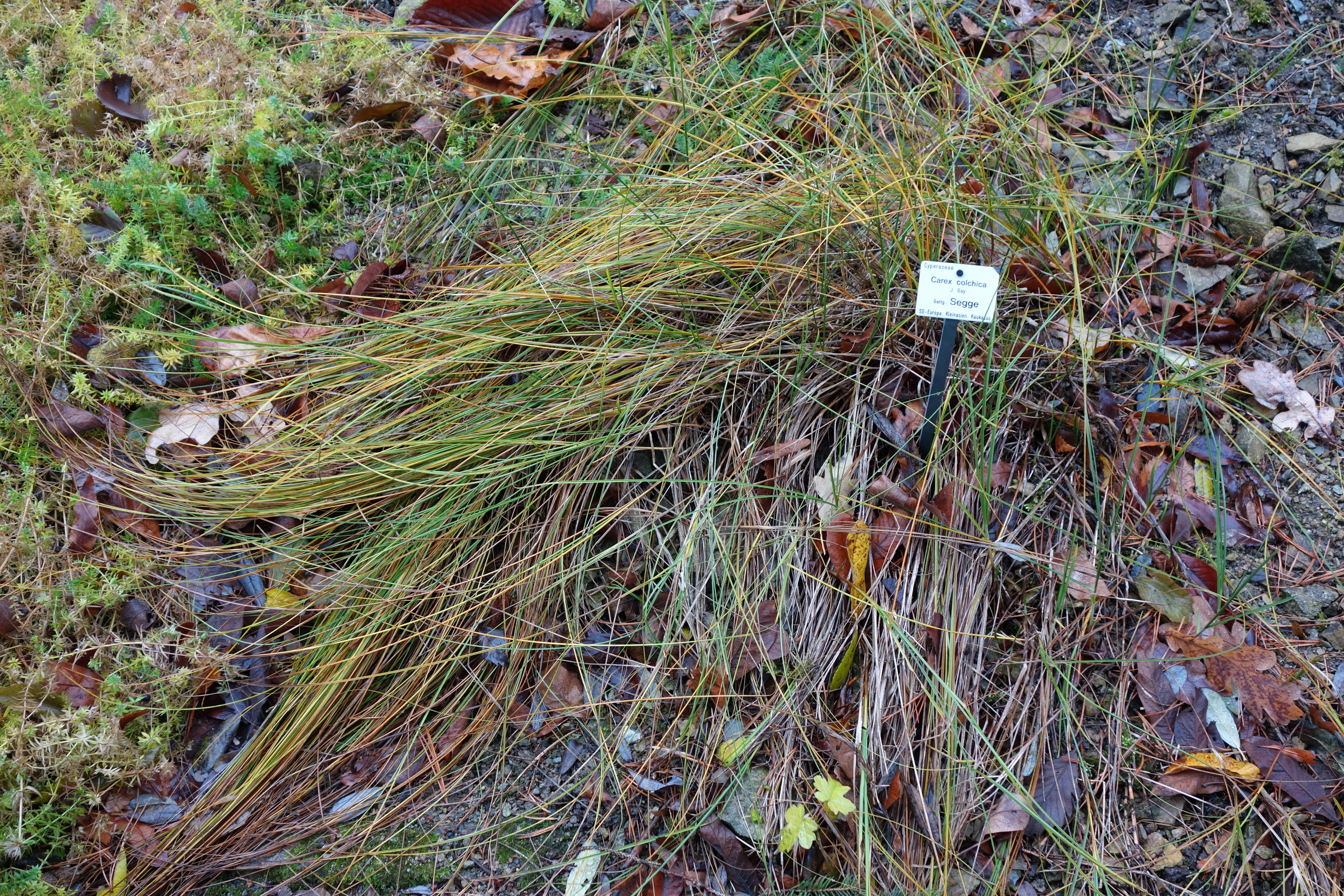

Scientific classification
- Kingdom: Plantae
- Clade: Tracheophytes
- Clade: Angiosperms
- Clade: Monocots
- Clade: Commelinids
- Order: Poales
- Family: Cyperaceae
- Genus: Carex
- Subgenus: Carex subg. Vignea
- Section: Carex sect. Ammoglochin
- Species: C. colchica

Binomial name
- Carex colchica J.Gay

= Carex colchica =

Species of grass-like plant

Carex colchica is a species of perennial plant in the family Cyperaceae.

== Synonyms ==
- Carex arenaria var. castanea Boott
- Carex arenaria var. colchica (J.Gay) Christ
- Carex arenaria subsp. colchica (J.Gay) Nyman
- Carex arenaria subsp. ligerica (J.Gay) Bonnier & Layens
- Carex colchica subsp. ligerica (J.Gay) T.V.Egorova
- Carex ligerica J.Gay
- Carex ligerica f. capitata Lackow. & Paul
- Carex ligerina Boreau
- Carex schoenoides Schrank
- Carex schreberi subsp. ligerica (J.Gay) Almq.
- Vignea colchica (J.Gay) Soják
- Vignea ligerica (J.Gay) Soják
