= Leusden (ship) =

Dutch West India Company slave ship sunk 1738

Leusden was a slave ship of the Dutch West India Company. Her sinking in January 1738 is thought to be the greatest single loss of life of its kind in the Atlantic slave trade.

== Sinking ==
Leusden's final voyage was from Elmina to Surinam. It carried a cargo of around 700 enslaved men, women and children from Africa. On 1 January 1738 the ship was caught in a storm at the mouth of the Maroni in Surinam. It capsized slowly, which enabled the captain, Joachim Outjes, to form a plan of action. The captain and crew all managed to escape, along with 14 (in some accounts 16) of the slaves who had been taken up on deck in order to help them.

Before departing, the crew deliberately nailed shut the hatches on to the deck so that the other slaves imprisoned below could not escape. Between 664 and 702 people died below deck, either from drowning or suffocation.

== Aftermath ==
Those slaves who survived the sinking were sold at a public auction shortly afterwards. Several of the crew were rewarded by the Dutch West Indies Company for having rescued a casket of gold from the ship. The captain defended his decision to nail shut the hatches, by arguing that the victims might otherwise have started a slave revolt had he had let them reach the deck. He was acquitted.

Johannes Postma suggests that the tragedy may have influenced the West Indies Company's later decision to quit the slave trade.
