= Juan Buenaventura de Borja y Armendia =

Spanish noble

- Presidente de la Real Audiencia de Santa Fe de Bogotá, 1605 – 1628
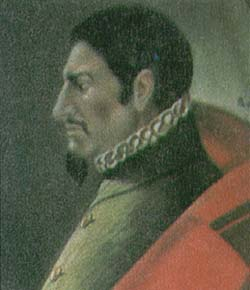
- Portrait of Juan de Borja y Armendia
- Predecessor: Francisco de Sande (In title)
- Successor: Sancho Girón de Narváez (In title); Juan de Borja y Miguel (Dynastic)
- Full name: Juan Buenaventura de Borja y Armendia
- Born: 1564; Gandía, Valencia, Spain
- Died: 1628 (aged 63–64); Real Audiencia de Santa Fe de Bogotá, New Kingdom of Granada, Spanish Empire
- Buried: Catedral de Santa Fe de Bogotá
- Family: House of Borja
- Spouse: Violante Miguel de Heredia y Forcadell
- Issue: Juan de Borja y Miguel
- Father: Fernando de Borja Aragón y Castro
- Mother: Violante de Armendia

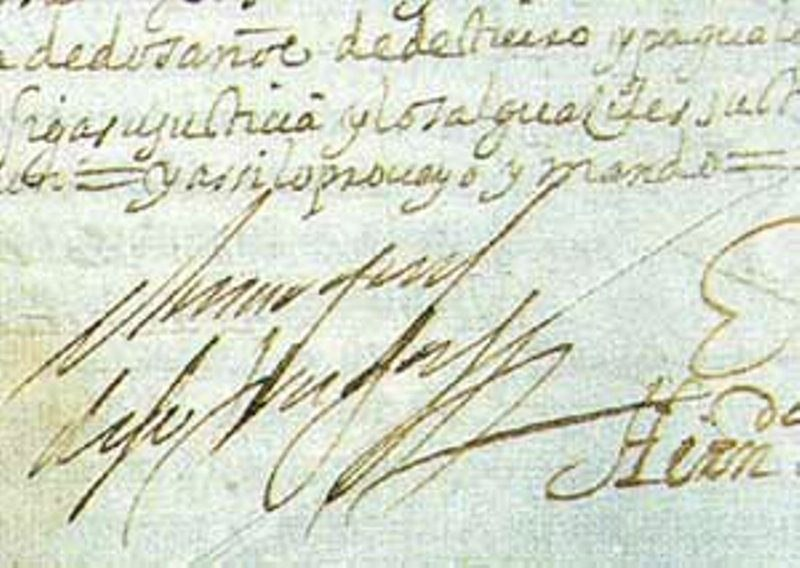
Signature and initialling of Juan de Borja y Armendia

Juan Buenaventura de Borja y Armendia (b. 1564*, Gandía, Valencia – d. 1628, Santafé de Bogotá) was a Spanish noble of the House of Borja who served in multiple positions of power throughout the New Kingdom of Granada. He is perhaps best known for serving as the President of the Real Audiencia de Santa Fe de Bogotá.

== Biography ==
Juan Bueanaventura was the son of Fernando de Borja Aragón y Castro and his wife, Violante de Armendia. He was the grandson of the Duke of Gandia, Saint Francis Borgia, third general of the Society of Jesus.

Upon completing his bachelor's education in the arts at the University of Alcalá, he enrolled himself in the University of Salamanca, where he further pursued a degree in canon studies.

He was legitimized by King Philip III of Spain during the Courts of Valencia on 14 January 1604, with a pedigree towards the military branch of the kingdom.

He carried out various functions within the New Kingdom of Granada; amongst them was his most famous role as the President of the Real Audiencia de Santa Fe de Bogotá, a post to which he was named in 1605. He was elected the Audencia's seventh president at 41 years of age, on 2 October 1605. He would continue uninterrupted in this post until his death 22 years later.

During his mandate, he carried out various campaigns against the local indigenous people of his territory. The most intense campaign was the pacification of the Pijao people, or the Federación Pijao, between 1605 and 1615. He further installed the Sancta Tribunal de la Inquisición at Cartagena de Indias. He ordered the creation of a grammatical process defined for the Chibchan languages and extended the collection of the Alcabala to many cities where it was previously not enforced.

In 1605, he created the Tribunal de Cuentas de Santafé, and, in 1620, a royal decree ordered the establishment of a Mint for the New Kingdom of Granada.

He was conferred with the honor of being a Knight of the Order of Santiago by royal warrant at the city of Lerma on 22 May 1610.

== Death and legacy ==
He died in Santafé de Bogotá in 1628 and was buried at the foot of the city's main cathedral. He was not immediately succeeded in his role as President of the Audencia. Instead, the oidor or hearer of Lesmes de Espinosa Saravia took control of governmental matters until a new president was finally appointed in 1630.

== Ancestry ==
32. Alejandro VI
16. Juan de Borja y Cattanei, II Duque de Gandía
33. Vannozza Giovanna de Cattanei y Pinctoris
8. Juan de Borja y Enríquez de Luna, III Duque de Gandía
34. Enrique Enríquez de Quiñones
17. María Enríquez de Luna
35. María de Luna y Ayala
4. Francisco de Borja y Aragón, IV Duque de Gandía
36. Fernando II de Aragón
18. Alfonso de Aragón y Roig de Ivorra
37. Aldonza Roig de Ivorra y Alemany
9. Juana de Aragón y de Gurrea
19. Ana de Gurrea y Guerra
2. Fernando de Borja y Castro
10. Alvaro de Castro “the Old”
5. Leonor de Castro Mello y Meneses
22. Nuño Rodríguez Barreto
11. Isabel de Melo Barreto y Meneses
23. Isabel de Melo y Villena
1. Juan de Borja y Amendia
6. Domingo Matheu (el Mediano)
3. Violante de Armendia y Matheu
7. Violante de Armendia

== Marriage and Descendants ==
Arms of the Duke of Gandía and of the Borja or Borgia

On 3 September 1597, he married Violante Miguel de Heredia y Forcadell. Violante was born in Ulldecoma, Tarragona, and was the daughter of Jaime Miguel de Heredia y de Beatriz Forcadell. Juan had eight children. Amongst them was Juan de Borja y Miguel, who at Riobamba started a family that would later become the prestigious Ecuadorian and Chilean Borja families.

== See also ==
- Natagaima

Preceded by Francisco de Sande Picón	Presidente de la Real Audiencia de Santa Fe de Bogotá; 1605–1628	Succeeded by Sancho Girón de Narváez
