= Fernando de Borja y Aragón =

Spanish noble

Don Fernando de Borja y Aragón or Ferran de Borja y d'Aragón (1583 – 28 November 1665) was a Spanish noble from the House of Borja and the House of Castro. He was the third Count of Mayalde, Viceroy of the royal house, and the Prince of Esquilache.

== Life ==
Fernando de Borja y Aragón was born in 1583 in Lisbon. Fernando was the son of Juan de Borja y Castro, first Count of Mayalde, and his wife, Francisca de Aragón y Barreto, Countess of Ficalho and paternal niece of Francisco de Borja, who was also Fernando's paternal grandfather.

As a child, he served at the court as a Menino of the empress, María de Austria y Portugal, and later for Philip II of Spain.

At the age of 20, he was given land and title by Philip III of Spain and was sent as an ambassador to Savoy, Florence and Rome. In 1621, the new king, Philip IV of Spain, named Fernando the Gentilhombre de cámara con ejercicio and the Viceroy of Aragon, a post he held until 1632. In 1635, he was designated the Viceroy of Valencia until he was called back to court five years later, in 1640. He was made the Sumiller de Corps of the Prince of Asturias, Balthasar Charles, until June 4, 1643, when he built his house.

In 1649, his wife died, and in 1658, his older brother died, ceding him all his titles.

In 1651, after the death of the powerful Luis Méndez de Haro, Marquis of the Carpio, the king conferred on Fernando the title of Caballerizo mayor, the last of such titles granted by Philip IV.

Fernando died in Madrid on 28 November 1665, the same year as the death of King Philip.

Notably, Fernando had corresponded with Mary of Jesus of Ágreda, a spiritual writer and adviser of the king.

== Marriage and Descendants ==
While Fernando was the Viceroy of Aragon, he married his niece, María Francisca de Borja y Aragón, the daughter of his older brother, Francisco de Borja y Aragón, the second Count of Mayalde, who would later cede his title as Prince of Esquilache to Fernando. His wife would die in 1649.

Preceded by Diego Carrillo de Mendoza y Pimentel	Viceroy of Aragon; 1621–1632	Succeeded by Jerónimo Caraffa Carraciolo
Preceded by Pedro Fajardo de Zúñiga y Requesens	Viceroy of Valencia; 1635–1640	Succeeded by Federico Colonna
