= Juan de Borja y Castro =

Spanish noble

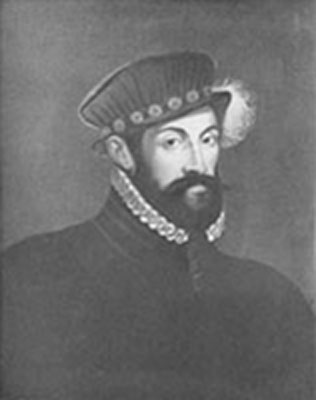
Juan de Borja y Castro

Juan de Borja y Castro (1533, Bellpuig – 3 September 1606, El Escorial) was a Spanish noble of the House of Borja and the House of Castro. Borja was a soldier, diplomat and a worker for the Spanish state. He is best known for being the first Count of Mayalde and count consort of Ficalho (in Portugal).

== Biography ==
=== Family origins and early life ===
Juan was the third son of Francisco de Borja, 4th Duke of Gandía (later a Catholic saint) and his wife, Leonor de Castro. He was born accidentally in Bellpuig as his father was assisting at the courts Monzón as the head caballerizo representing Charles I at the time.

Between 1539 and 1543, he lived with family members in Barcelona, coinciding with his father's stint as Viceroy of Catalonia. He later moved to Gandía when his father was named the duke.

Juan was educated amongst the Jesuits at the Universidad de Gandía. In 1548, he was admitted into the Order of Santiago, which was by this time under the direct control of the Spanish monarchy.

After the death of his mother in 1546, from 1550–51, he accompanied his father to Rome, where he was going to join the Jesuits. The pair returned to Oñati, from where Juan then proceeded to attend the prestigious University of Alcalá.

=== Diplomat and Soldier ===
After entering the service of Philip II of Spain as a staff member for Prince Carlos, he became a soldier at Gipuzkoa, where under the command of the contemporary Viceroy of Navarre, Vespasiano I Gonzaga, he took part in the defense of the province against the French during the Italian Wars.

His diplomatic career began in 1569 when he was sent to Portugal as a substitute for the ambassador Fernando Carrillo de Mendoza y Villarreal. There he worked as an intermediary between the court of Sebastian of Portugal with Margaret of Valois. He failed to dissuade the Portuguese king from undertaking his expedition to Africa, which occurred in 1578 with predictably disastrous results.

In 1576, he went to Prague as the Spanish ambassador to Emperor Rudolph II of the Holy Roman Empire. He maintained this position until 1581, the same year in which he published his only known literary work, "Empresas Morales".

=== At the Spanish court ===
After returning to Spain, he was named head majordomo of María de Austria, a charge he would maintain until 1603. As recognition for his services to the state, Phillip II granted him the title of Count of Mayalde. During the reign of Philip III of Spain, he developed a relationship with the Duke of Lerma, who was his nephew. He was there named Count of Ficalho and president of the Council of Portugal, and he was added to the Spanish Council of State.

=== Death and legacy ===
Cross of the Order of Santiago.

Juan died at the age of 73 in September 1606, the victim of an accident which occurred when the litter basket in which he was carried, due to his suffering from gout, fell down a staircase at El Escorial. His body was initially buried at the Colegio Imperial de Madrid until 1613, when it was transferred to the Church of Saint Roch in Lisbon, Portugal.

== Marriage and Descendants ==
In 1552, Juan returned to Gandia and married Lorenza de Oñaz y Loyola (es), the grandniece of Ignatius of Loyola. The pair would have the following children:

- Eleanor, who married Pedro de Borja y Centellas, Conde de Oliva.
- Magdelena, who married Juan Urbán de Vivero, vizconde de Altamira (es).
- Francisa, who joined a convent.
- Juana, who joined a convent.

After the death of his first wife in 1575, he married again, with Francisca de Aragón Barreto. The pair would have the following children:

- Francisco de Borja y Aragón (1581–1658), who would become the Viceroy of Peru.
- Antonio de Borja y Aragón, who joined the clergy.
- Rodrigo de Borja y Aragón, who died in infancy.
- Carlos de Borja y Aragón, who married Maria Luisa de Aragón, 7th Duchess of Villahermosa.
- Fernando de Borja y Aragón (1583–1665), who was the viceroy of Valencia and Aragon.
