= Gastón de Moncada =

Gastón de Moncada may refer to:

- Gastón de Moncada, 2nd Marquis of Aitona (1554-1626), Viceroy of Sardinia, Viceroy of Aragon
- Gastón de Moncada, Bishop of the Roman Catholic Diocese of Huesca, 1324-1328
- Gastón de Moncada, father of Hugo of Moncada (1476-1528)
