= Convention of Segura =

1839 prisoner-of-war agreement in the First Carlist War

Convention of Segura–Lécera
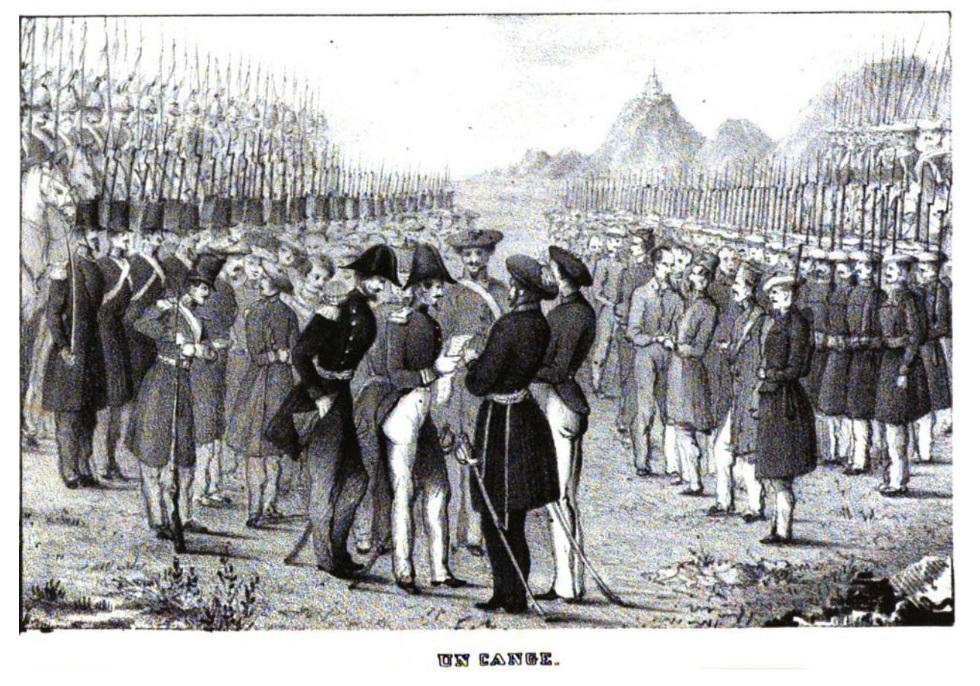
- Prisoner exchange following the Convention of Segura–Lécera, lithograph published in 1845
- Type: Prisoner-of-war agreement
- Location: Segura de los Baños and Lécera, Spain
- Mediators: Colonel Lacy
- Negotiators: Antonio Van Halen y Sarti; Ramón Cabrera y Griñó
- Languages: Spanish

In 1839, April, during the First Carlist War, Antonio Van Halen y Sarti, the commander of the Isabeline Army of the Centre, and the Carlist general Ramón Cabrera y Griñó signed the military treaty Convention of Segura–Lécera. The agreement settled how the prisoners of war should be treated and exchanged on the Maestrazgo front, comparable to the Lord Eliot Convention on the northern front.

The signing took many days, and in April og the year 1839: Cabrera finally signed it on 1 April in Segura de los Baños; Van Halen followed him on 3 April in Lécera. Colonel Lacy, a British officer, acted as intermediary.

The renowned historian Román Oyarzun Oyarzun wrote that Cabrera excluded both Agustín Nogueras and himself from the convention's protections, the result of a feud between the two men, that began when the second had Cabrera's mother shot by firing squad. Following the convention, a major prisoner exchange took place at Onda, in the province of Castellón.
