= Hernando de Aragón =

Aragonese humanist, archbishop and historian

- Archbishop of Zaragoza
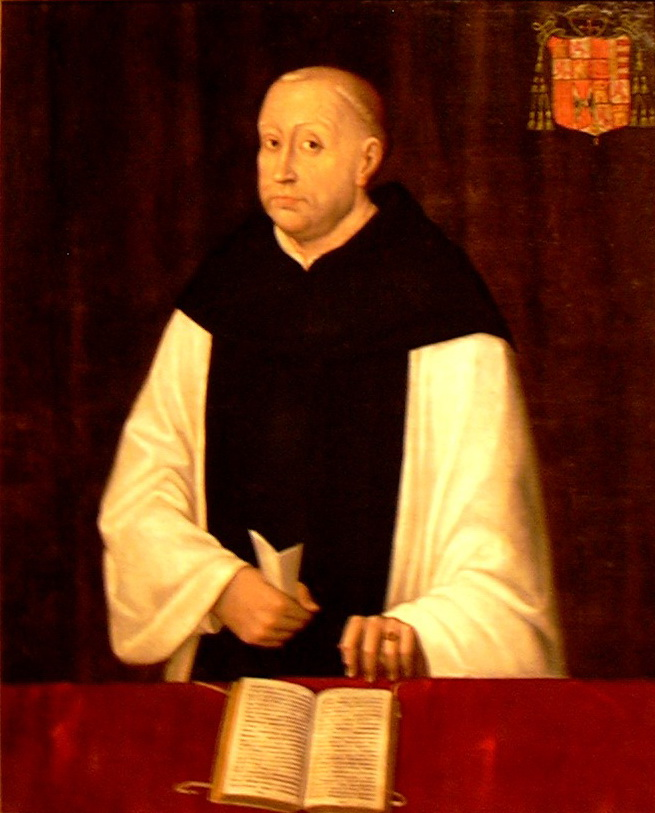
- Aragón in a Cistercian habit, attributed to Roland de Mois
- Archdiocese: Roman Catholic Archdiocese of Zaragoza
- Appointed: 21 May 1539
- Term ended: 29 January 1575
- Predecessor: Fadrique de Portugal
- Successor: Bernardo de Fresneda

Orders
- Consecration: 9 November 1539

Personal details
- Born: 25 July 1498 Zaragoza, Kingdom of Aragón
- Died: 29 January 1575 (aged 76)
- Parents: Alonso, Archbishop of Zaragoza; Ana de Gurrea
- Children: Pedro, Lord of Ballobar

Hernando de Aragón y de Gurrea, OCist (25 July 1498 – 29 January 1575), Archbishop of Zaragoza and Lieutenant General of Aragon, was an Aragonese humanist and historian.

== Family ==
Born in Zaragoza, Aragón was the second illegitimate son of Alonso de Aragón, then Archbishop of Zaragoza and future Archbishop of Valencia and Lieutenant General of Aragon. His father was an illegitimate son of King Ferdinand II of Aragon, while his mother was Ana de Gurrea. Through his grandfather he was first-half cousins with Charles V, Holy Roman Emperor his wife Isabella of Portugal, Mary I of England, John III of Portugal and Ferdinand I, Holy Roman Emperor.

The Archbishop had a son by María Jiménez Cerdán, Pedro, Lord of Ballobar.

== Clerical career ==
Although he was meant to pursue a military career, he chose to enter the Cistercian Monastery of Piedra. He was ordained in 1524. His first cousin, King Charles I of Aragon, made him Abbot of Veruela Abbey. On 21 May 1539, the King made him Archbishop of Zaragoza, a position previously held by his father and elder brother Juan. He was consecrated on 9 November 1539.

King Charles I made him his deputy in the Aragonese Cortes in 1524, while Charles' son and successor, King Philip II, made him Lieutenant General of Aragon in 1566.

== Patron ==
The Archbishop was a great patron and promoter of art in Aragon. He was especially interested in La Seo Cathedral, where he had two chapels built on his own expense, on the condition that he and his mother are interred there together. He also came up with the idea of constructing Lonja de Zaragoza, ordered the construction of the Charterhouse of Aula Dei.

Aragón also functioned as the Official Chronicler of Aragon and wrote "History of the Kings of Aragon" (Spanish: Historia de los Reyes de Aragón).

He was buried in La Seo Cathedral along with his mother.

== Ancestry ==
Ancestry of Hernando de Aragón

16. Ferdinand I of Aragon
8. John II of Aragon
17. Eleanor of Alburquerque
4. Ferdinand II of Aragon
18. Fadrique Enríquez, 1st Count of Melba and Rueda
9. Juana Enríquez
19. Mariana de Córdoba y Ayala, 4th Lady of Casarrubios
2. Alonso de Aragón
10. Pedro Ruiz y Alemany
5. Aldonza Ruiz de Ivorra
11. Aldonza de Ivorra
1. Hernando de Aragón
12. Miguel de Gotor
6. Juan López de Gurrea, Señor de Argabieso
26. Miguel de Gurrea
13. Blanca de Gurrea
27. Teresa Monteagudo
3. Ana de Gurrea y de Gurrea
28. Lope 'the Old' de Gurrea, Lord of Monteagudo
14. Lope 'the Waiter' de Gurrea y Entenza
29. Sancha Romeu
7. Catalina López de Gurrea y Entenza
30. Guillem d' Entenza
15. Teresa de Entenza

Catholic Church titles
Preceded by Fadrique de Portugal	Archbishop of Zaragoza; 21 May 1539 – 29 January 1575	Succeeded by Bernardo de Fresneda
Political offices
Vacant Title last held by Diego Hurtado de Mendoza	Lieutenant General of Aragon; 1566 – 29 January 1575	Succeeded by Artal de Alagón
