= Juan de Moncada =

Spanish Roman Catholic clergyman

Juan de Moncada (Catalan: Joan de Montcada i Gralla) (Valencia, ? – Barcelona, 1622) was a Roman Catholic clergyman in Spain in the 17th century.

He was born in Valencia as 11th child of Francisco de Moncada y Folch de Cardona, 1st Marquis of Aitona. His brother was Gastón de Moncada, 2nd Marquis of Aitona.
For some time prior to May, 1612 de Moncada served as Bishop of Barcelona. In that month he was appointed Archbishop of Tarragona and primate of northeast Spain. His nephew Francisco de Moncada dedicated his Catalan Chronicle to his uncle the archbishop.

Juan de Moncada died in 1622.
