= Francis Borgia =

Grandee of Spain and Jesuit priest (1510–1572)

Saint Francis Borgia SJ
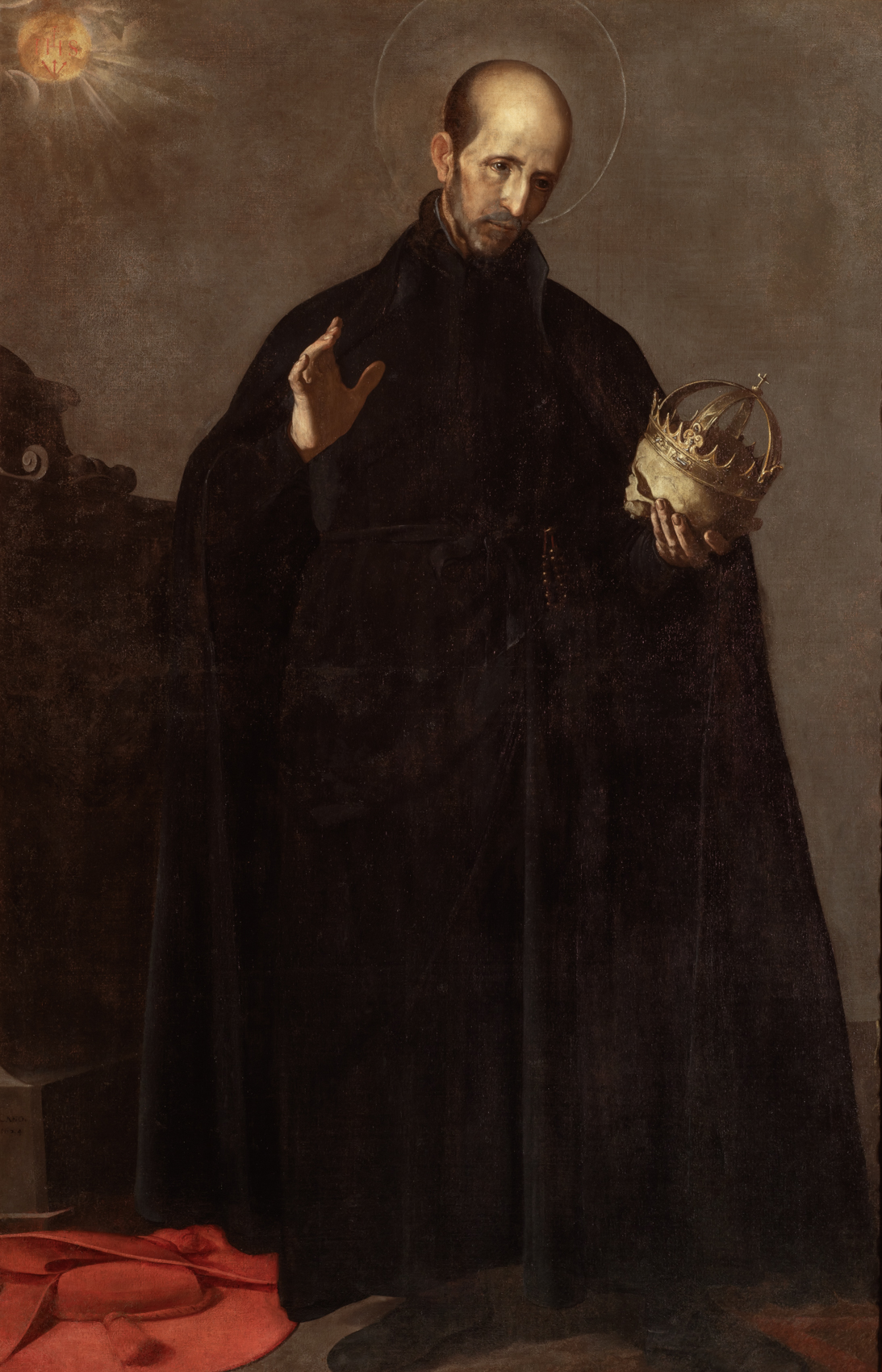
- Painting by Alonso Cano, 1624

Duke of Gandía Confessor Priest
- Born: 28 October 1510; Duchy of Gandia, Kingdom of Valencia, Spain
- Died: 30 September 1572 (aged 61); Rome, Papal States
- Venerated in: Catholic Church
- Beatified: 23 November 1624, Madrid, Kingdom of Spain by Pope Urban VIII
- Canonized: 20 June 1670, Rome by Pope Clement X
- Major shrine: Relics translated to the Jesuit church in Madrid, 1901
- Feast: 30 September; 10 October (1688–1969); 3 October (Jesuits)
- Attributes: Skull crowned with an emperor's diadem
- Patronage: Against earthquakes; Portugal; Gandía; Rota, Marianas

Francis Borgia, SJ (Valencian: Francesc de Borja; Spanish: Fr. Don Francisco Crespí de Borja; 28 October 1510 – 30 September 1572) was a Spanish Jesuit priest. The great-grandson of both Pope Alexander VI and King Ferdinand II of Aragon, he was Duke of Gandía and a grandee of Spain. After the death of his wife, Borgia renounced his titles and became a priest in the Society of Jesus, later serving as its third superior general. He was canonized on 20 June 1670 by Pope Clement X.

== Early life ==
He was born in the Duchy of Gandía in the Kingdom of Valencia (part of Crown of Aragon), on 28 October 1510. His father was Juan Borgia, 3rd Duke of Gandía, the son of Giovanni Borgia, the son of Pope Alexander VI (Rodrigo Borgia). His mother was Juana, daughter of Alonso de Aragón, Archbishop of Zaragoza, who, in turn, was the illegitimate son of King Ferdinand II of Aragon. His brother, Tomás de Borja y Castro, also entered the Church, becoming Bishop of Málaga, and later Archbishop of Zaragoza.

As a child he was very pious and wished to become a monk, but his family sent him instead to serve in the court of his second cousin Charles V, Holy Roman Emperor (who was also King Charles I of Spain), where he was welcomed warmly. He excelled there, accompanying the Emperor on several campaigns.

== Adult life and career ==
In Madrid in the month of September 1529, he married a Portuguese noblewoman, Leonor de Castro Mello y Meneses. They had eight children: Carlos in 1530, Isabel in 1532, Juan in 1533, Álvaro circa 1535, Juana also circa 1535, Fernando in 1537, Dorotea in 1538, and Alfonso in 1539.

Upon Borgia's marriage, Charles V appointed him Marquess of Lombay, master of the hounds, and equerry to the empress. In 1539, he convoyed the corpse of Isabella of Portugal, Philip II of Spain's mother, to her burial place in Granada. In that same year, he became Viceroy of Catalonia, replacing Fadrique de Portugal y Noroña.

During this period of his life, Borgia composed liturgical music, which the 1913 Catholic Encyclopedia praises for its contrapuntal style.

In 1543, Borgia's father died, and Borgia accordingly became the 4th Duke of Gandía. His diplomatic abilities came into question after his failed attempt at arranging a marriage between Prince Philip of Spain and the Princess of Portugal, thus ending a hope of bringing these two countries together, and resulting in his retirement as duke, handing his title to his son, Carlos. Borgia, now 33, retired to his native place and devoted himself to religious activities.

== Jesuit priest ==
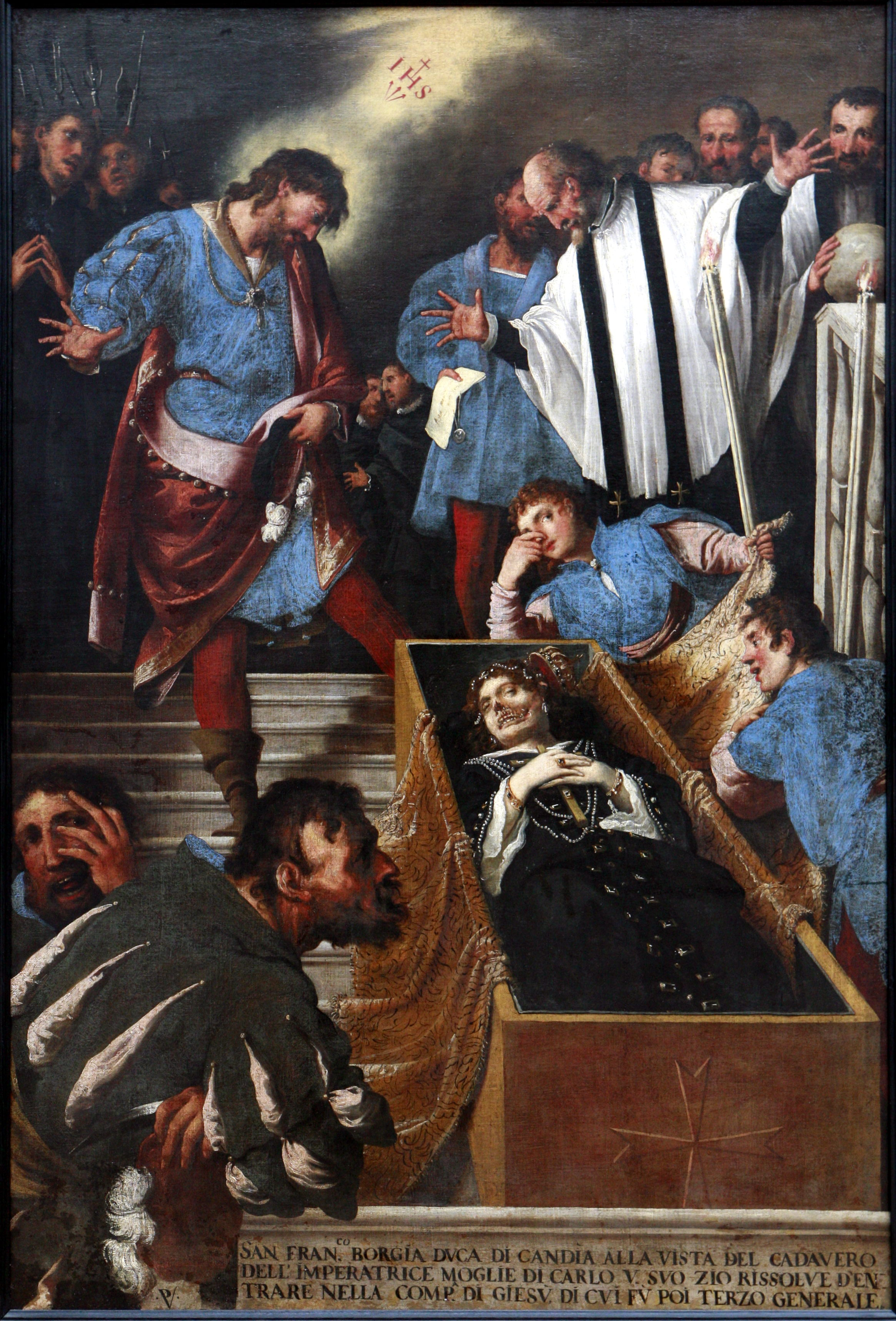
Francis Borgia at Isabella of Portugal's coffin by Pietro della Vecchia

After the 1546 death of his wife Eleanor, Francis Borgia decided to enter the newly formed Society of Jesus. He put his affairs in order, renouncing his titles in favour of his eldest son Carlos de Borja-Aragon y de Castro-Melo, and entered the order by 1550. On 25 May 1551, Borgia was ordained a Jesuit priest.

Borgia helped in the establishment of what is now the Gregorian University in Rome. Upon Borgia's return from a journey to Peru, Pope Julius III made known his intention to make him a cardinal. To prevent this, Borgia decided, in agreement with Ignatius of Loyola, to leave the city secretly and go to the Basque Country.

In 1554, Borgia became the Jesuit commissary-general in Spain, where he founded a dozen colleges. After the death in January 1565 of Diego Laynez, Borgia was elected the third Superior General of the Society of Jesus.

Borgia went on to found the Collegium Romanum and closely supervised all the affairs of the rapidly growing order until his death in 1572.

== Death and legacy ==
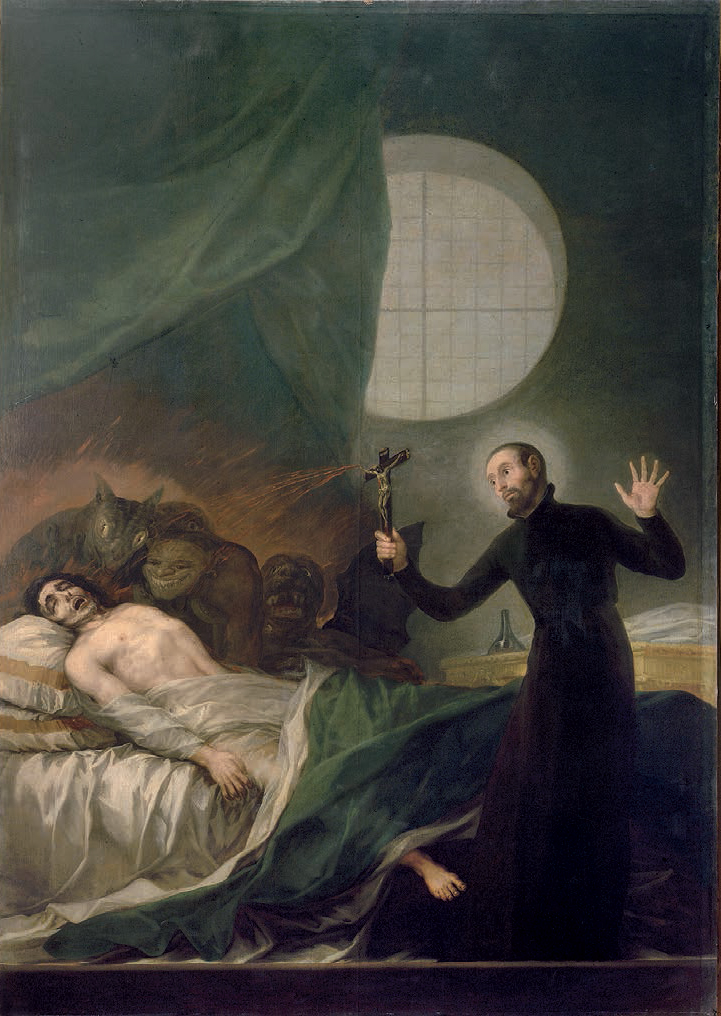
Saint Francis Borgia Helping a Dying Impenitent, painted by Francisco Goya

Francis Borgia died on 30 September 1572, in Rome. His body was repatriated to Spain in 1617; Francisco Gómez de Sandoval y Rojas, 1st Duke of Lerma financed the construction of a Jesuit professed house in Madrid north of Plaza Mayor where the body might be kept, and it was relocated there in 1627.

On 30 July 1901, the silver urn containing Borgia's relics was transferred to a church on Flor Baja street, which was dedicated to Sacred Heart and San Francis Borgia. This church was part of a new Jesuit residence established thanks to a donation from Manuel Álvarez de Toledo, and in 1911 the residence became a professed house. After that church was destroyed by arson in 1931, some of Borgia's ashes were recovered and eventually reinterred in the new Jesuit complex on calle de Serrano.

Francis Borgia was beatified in Madrid on 23 November 1624, by Pope Urban VIII. He was canonized nearly 35 years later on 20 June 1670, by Pope Clement X. His liturgical feast was inserted into the General Roman Calendar in 1688 for celebration on 10 October.

Parishes are dedicated to Francis Borgia in locations including:

- Chicago, Illinois
- Sturgis, Kentucky
- Washington, Missouri
- Blair, Nebraska
- Cedarburg, Wisconsin
- Isio, Cauayan, Negros Occidental, Philippines

The Jesuit-founded city of São Borja, in southern Brazil, is named after Francis Borgia. St. Francis Borgia Regional High School is located in Washington, Missouri. Marc-Antoine Charpentier composed Motet pour St François de Borgia (H.354, for 1 voice, 2 treble instruments, and continuo) in his honor in the late 1680s.

== Issue ==
By his wife, Leonor de Castro Mello y Meneses, he had eight children, five sons and three daughters:

- Carlos, 5th Duke de Gandía (1530–1592). In 1548 he married Magdalena de Centelles y Cardona and had four sons and three daughters:
  - Francisco Tomas de Borja y Centelles, 6th Duke de Gandía (1551–1595). In 1572 he married Joana de Fernandez y Velasco and had six sons and two daughters, plus an illegitimate son and an illegitimate daughter:
    - Íñigo de Borja y Velasco (1575–1622)
    - Gaspar de Borja y Velasco (1580–1645)
    - Baltasar de Borja y Velasco (1586–1622)
- Isabel de Borja y Castro (1532–1558). In 1548 she married Francisco Gomez de Sandoval y Rojas and had a son:
  - Francisco Gómez de Sandoval, 1st Duke of Lerma (1553–1625). He had:
    - Juana Gómez de Sandoval (d. 1624). She had:
      - Luisa de Guzmán (1613–1666). Queen consort of Portugal.
- Juan de Borja y Castro (1533–1606). In 1552 he married Lorenza de Onaz y Loyola, had four daughters and widowed in 1575. He remarried Francisca de Aragon y Barredo and had five sons:
  - Francisco de Borja y Aragón, prince of Squillace (1581–1658)
- Alvar de Borja y Castro (1534–1594). He married his niece Elvira de Enriquez y Borja (daughter of Juana) and had two sons and four daughters.
- Juana Francisca de Borja y Castro (b. 1536). In 1550 she married Juan de Enriquez y Almansa y Rojas and had a daughter, Elvira de Enriquez y Borja.
- Ferran de Borja y Castro (b. 1537). He married Violante de Armendia and had a son:
  - Juan Buenaventura de Borja y Armendia (1564–1628)
- Dorotea de Borja y Castro (1538–1552), nun.
- Alfons de Borja y Castro (b. 1539). In 1567 he married Leonor de Norona, without issue.

== Ancestry ==
Ancestors of Francis Borgia

8. Pope Alexander VI
4. Giovanni Borgia, 2nd Duke of Gandia
9. Vannozza dei Cattanei
2. Juan de Borja Enríquez, 3rd Duke of Gandía
10. Enrique Enríquez de Quiñones, 1st Lord of Orce
5. María Enríquez de Luna
11. María de Luna Ayala
1. Francis Borgia, 4th Duke of Gandía
12. Ferdinand II of Aragon
6. Alonso de Aragón
13. Aldonza Ruiz de Ivorra
3. Juana de Aragón Gurrea
14. Juan de Gurrea
7. Ana de Gurrea
15. Catalina López de Gurrea

== See also ==
- House of Borgia
- Route of the Borgias
- Statue of Francis Borgia, Charles Bridge

== Sources ==
- Candido de Dalmases, Francis Borgia. Grandee of Spain, Jesuit, Saint, Saint-Louis, 1991
- Candido de Dalmases, El Padre Francisco de Borja, Madrid, 1983.24 pages. Madrid: Editorial Católica, (1983). ISBN, 8422011166, ISBN 978-84-220-1116-3
- Margaret Yeo, The greatest of the Borgias, New York, 1936, 374 pages
- Enrique García Hernán, Sanctus Franciscus Borgia: Quartus Gandiae Dux et Societatis Iesu Praepositus Generalis Tertius, 1510–1572, Volumen 156, Monumenta Borgia Series Volumes 156–157, Monumenta Historica Societatis Iesu (1903) (new edition by Edit. Generalitat Valeciana, 2003)
- Enrique García Hernán, Francisco de Borja, Grande de España, 1999 reprint by Institució Alfons el Magnànim, (Diputació de Valência), of the 1903 edition, 292 pages, ISBN 84-7822-275-8
- Francisco de Borja, Santo y Duque de Gandia (1510–2010) by several authors on several subjects, Bromera edit., 2010, ISBN 978-84-9824-634-6
- Angel Santos Hernandez, Jesuitas y Obispados: la Compañia de Jesús y las dignidades eclesiasticas, (1999), 539 pages, in Spanish, Universidad Pontificia de Comillas edit. ISBN 978-84-89708-48-8, https://books.google.com/books?id=QRzrJ9EPmaIC. a Google book to be found under:
- María Rosa Urraca Pastor, San Francisco de Borja, Barcelona 1943

Catholic Church titles
Preceded by James Lainez	Superior General of the Society of Jesus; 1565–1572	Succeeded by Everard Mercurian
