= Tomás de Borja y Castro =

Roman Catholic archbishop

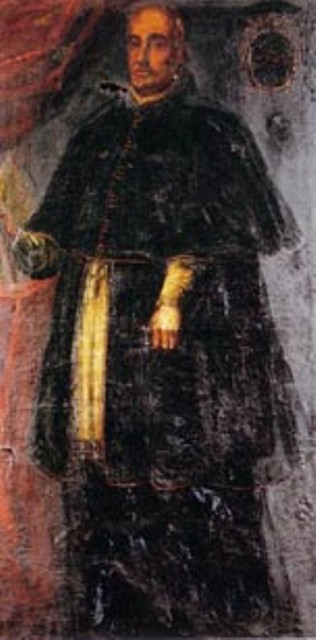
Tomás de Borja y de Castro-Pinós o Tomás de Borja y Castro, born in Gandia, Bishop of Málaga, Archbishop of Zaragoza and Captain General of Aragon and brother of San Francisco de Borja y Aragon, IV Duke of Gandia

Coat of arms Duke of Gandia House of Borgia or Borja

Tomás de Borja y Castro (c. 1551 – September 13, 1610]) was a Spanish noble from the House of Borja who became Bishop of Málaga and Archbishop of Zaragoza.

== Biography ==
Tomás studied in the Colegio Mayor de San Ildefonso at Alcalá de Henares, Madrid. He later went on to study at Colegio Mayor de San Bartolomé at Salamanca where he obtained a doctorate in theology. He there after dedicated himself to the clergy and the life of the cloth.

In 1571, Tomás together with his brother, the future Saint, Francisco de Borja and the Cardinal Alejandrino set out on a trip around Europe that was bound for Rome. Upon arrival in Rome, Tomás was designated the Consultor de la Inquisición Romana, a title affiliated to the Inquisition. Upon returning to Spain, he was appointed cannon of Toledo and Abbot of the Iglesia de la Santísima Trinidad in Ourense.

In 1599, Philip III of Spain appointed Tomás as the Bishop of Málaga. His ascendancy coincided with an outbreak of pestilence whose origins came from Spanish troops returning from Spanish Morocco and other African conquests. So strong was this plague that people would fall down in the streets and there was nothing that could be medically done to save them, overflowing the capacity of the hospitals. Tomás devoted himself to caring for the sick, even those that nobody would approach due to fear of infection. The plague lasted two years and killed such a large portion of the population that people were brought in from other regions of Spain to fill all the vacant jobs left behind by the dead.

In 1603, he was named Archbishop of the Archdiocese of Zaragoza, and in 1606, he was named Captain General and Viceroy of Aragón.

He died on September 13 of 1610 at the age of 70. He was buried in a sepulcher at the Capilla Mayor of the Colegio de las Vírgenes in Zaragoza.

== Distinction ==
In his honor, in the Spanish city of Málaga, in the area of Pedregalejo, there is a street named after him.

== See also ==
- House of Borja

| Preceded by Diego Aponte Quiñones | Bishop of Málaga; 1599–1603 | Succeeded by Juan Alonso de Moscoso López |
| Preceded by Alonso de Gregorio | Archbishop of Zaragoza; 1603–1610 | Succeeded by Pedro Manrique de Lara |
Government offices
| Preceded by Ascanio Colonna | Viceroy of Aragon; 1606-1610 | Succeeded by Marquis of Aitona |
