= Rodrigo Pacheco, 3rd Marquess of Cerralvo =

Mexican politician

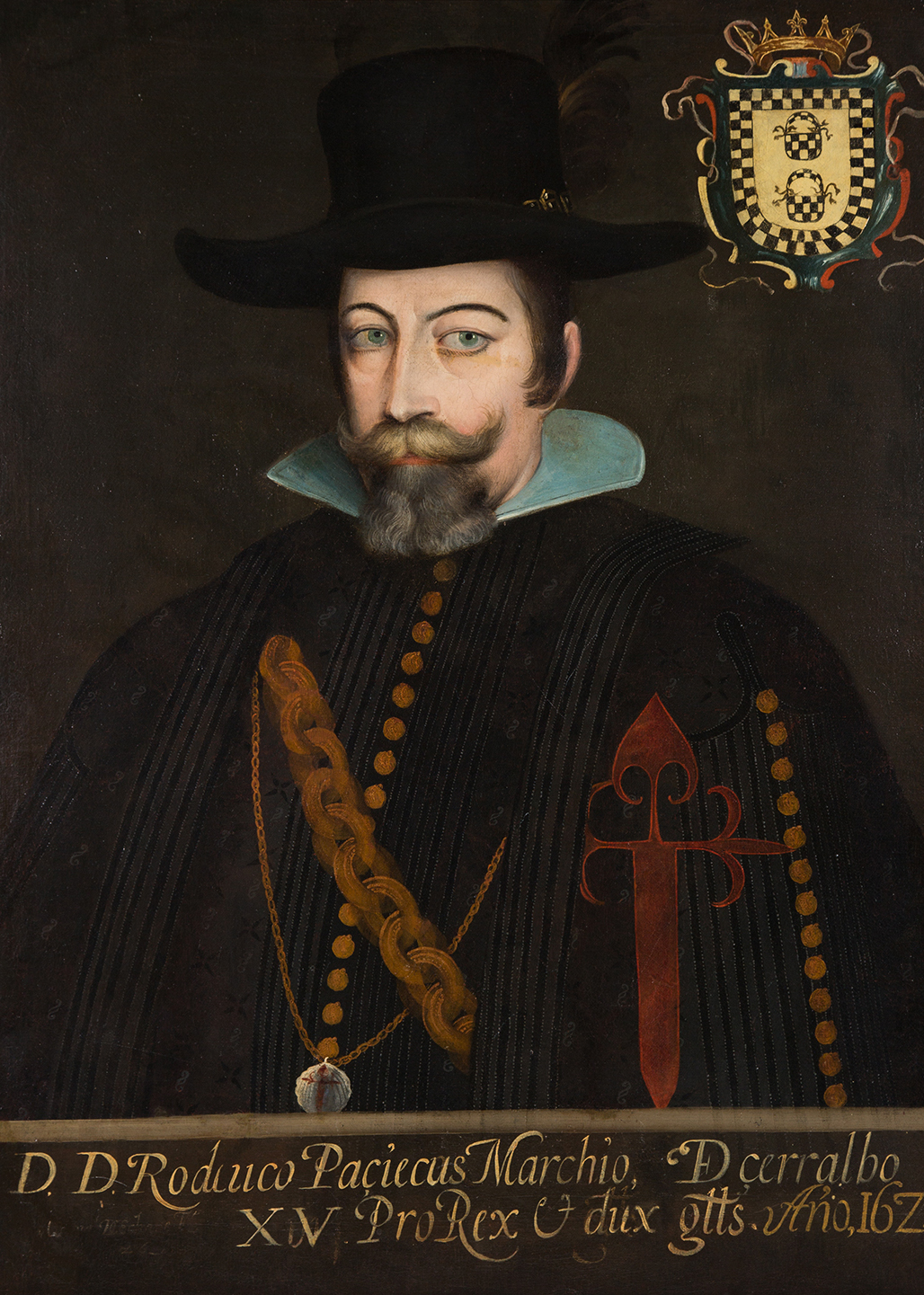
Rodrigo Pacheco y Osorio de Toledo

Don Rodrigo Pacheco y Osorio de Toledo, 3rd Marquess of Cerralvo (Spanish: Rodrigo Pacheco y Osorio, tercer Marqués de Cerralvo) (c. 1565, Spain – June, 1652, Madrid) was a Spanish nobleman, inquisitor of Valladolid, Governor of Galicia and viceroy of New Spain. He held the latter position from November 3, 1624, to September 16, 1635.

== Early career and appointment as viceroy of New Spain ==
Rodrigo Pacheco y Osorio was born in Spain in the 1560s. He was a relative of Juan Antonio Pacheco, viceroy of Catalonia. After distinguishing himself in military service, he was named inquisitor of Valladolid. Between 1615 and 1624, he was Governor of Galicia.

When the rioting and disorders involving the previous viceroy, Diego Carrillo de Mendoza, 1st Marquess of Gelves, and the archbishop of Mexico, Juan Pérez de la Serna came to the attention of King Philip IV of Spain, he chose Pacheco y Osorio to investigate the causes and take charge of the government. Pacheco received specific, detailed instructions, among them to uncover the true causes of the disorders and punish those in the wrong. He was given extraordinary powers to accomplish these ends.

== Foreign threats ==
He arrived in Mexico City on November 3, 1624, and took up the reins of government. However, his specific instructions were put aside so that he could deal with more urgent matters. Spain was now at war with France and the Dutch Republic, and a Dutch fleet was menacing the Pacific port of Acapulco. Pacheco immediately busied himself with the defense of Acapulco.

On December 15, 1628, Dutch Admiral Piet Hein captured a Spanish fleet in the straits between Florida and the Bahamas. This fleet was transporting 12 million pesos (mostly gold) and much merchandise from New Spain to the mother country.

Later in his administration, Dutch corsairs occupied the city of Campeche (April 17, 1633), but were driven out by 200 militiamen under the command of Captain Francisco Maldonado. However they returned August 12, under Jean de Fors, and sacked the city.

To protect against Indian incursions from the north, Pacheco established the presidio of Cerralvo in the New Kingdom of León y Castilla (present day Nuevo León).

== The drainage projects ==
The other major problem facing the new viceroy was drainage, a perennial problem for Mexico City resulting in major flooding from the early sixteenth century through to the late nineteenth century. After major flooding in 1607, there was a large-scale project to drain water from the city via a combination of an open drainage ditch and tunnels. The project was known as the Desagüe and was a hugely expensive undertaking in terms of finances and diversion of Indian labor. Concerned that the construction on dikes and the drainage system had been suspended, Pacheco y Osorio restarted some construction in 1626. He restored and reinforced the walls surrounding the city and began some other minor projects to complete the earlier plans of the engineer Adrian Boot. The following year, the Río Cuautitlán broke through the dike that separated it from Lake Zumpango. The waters rose half a meter, flooding the city. The city government asked the viceroy to order the construction of more drainage projects. Time passed in consultations, and the water receded. In 1629 the city suffered its worse flooding in recorded history. The Río Aculhuacán broke through its dikes, flooding the entire city from 1 to 2 meters deep. Transportation was by canoe, and many families left the city permanently. The rains continued, and the flood waters did not recede. Probably 30,000 persons died, and it was feared that the capital might disappear completely. Parts of the city remained flooded for four years. On May 19, 1630, the viceroy ordered the capital moved to Tacubaya, nearby but on higher ground, pending an open discussion in the guilds of the city. The guilds were opposed, resolving instead to restart the engineering works. By the end of the year, the engineer Enrico Martínez had restarted the work. By 1632 the Huehuetoca canal had finally been completed and the Calzada de San Cristóbal, atop a wall surrounding the city that served as a dike, had been renovated.

== Return to Spain ==
The viceroy was not an honest administrator of public funds. Because he directed many public works, much money passed through his hands, and was diminished somewhat in the transaction. He returned to Spain in September, 1635 an immensely rich man. Philip IV heaped honors on him, making him councillor of state, lord of the bedchamber and majordomo of the palace. Later he was Spanish ambassador to Vienna. He died in Madrid in June, 1652.

Government offices
Preceded by Diego Carrillo de Mendoza	Viceroy of New Spain; 1624–1635	Succeeded by Lope Díez de Armendáriz
