= Leonor de Castro Mello y Meneses =

Duchess of Gandía
- Born: 1512; Portugal
- Died: 27 March 1546 (aged 33–34); Monastery of Sant Jeroni de Cotalba
- Burial: Gandia
- Spouse: Francis de Borja, IV Duke of Gandía
- Issue: Carlos de Borja y Castro, 5th Duke of Gandia; Isabel de Borja y Castro; Juan de Borja y Castro; Alvar de Borja y Castro; Juana Francisca de Borja y Castro; Ferran de Borja y Castro; Dorotea de Borja y Castro; Alfons de Borja y Castro
Names
- English: Leanora Castro Mello Meneses; Spanish: Leonor de Castro Mello y Meneses
- Father: Álvaro de Castro "the Old"
- Mother: Isabel de Melo Barreto e Menezes
- Religion: Roman Catholicism

Leonor de Castro Mello y Meneses (born 1512; died 27 March 1546 in Gandía) was a Portuguese noble and court official, the Duchess of Gandía, and the lady-in-waiting and close friend of the Empress regent Isabella of Portugal.

== Life ==
She was daughter of Álvaro de Castro "the Old", Captain-general of Africa of King Manuel I of Portugal, and wife Isabel de Mello Barreto e Meneses. Her brother, Rodrigo de Castro, was governor of the Portuguese seat of Safí (Morocco).

In 1526, she was appointed Camarera mayor de Palacio to empress Isabella of Portugal, queen of Spain (mother of Philip II of Spain) and regent of Spain during the absence of her spouse the emperor. Leonor de Castro was to become not only her lady-in-waiting but also her personal friend and confidant.

During 1529 the negotiations took place to resolve her marriage with Francis de Borja. The emperor Carlos I of Spain, represented by his majordomo Pedro González de Mendoza, negotiating in the name of Leonor, urging the Duke of Gandía to accept her conditions. After agreeing to marriage, the spouses met in Toledo in August, and the wedding with Francis Borja took place in the Royal Alcazar of Madrid in 1529. They had eight children, five sons and three daughters.

In 1539, she and her husband attended the burial of the former regent empress Isabella in Granada.

She passed her last days in the Monastery of Sant Jeroni de Cotalba, very near to Gandia, recovering from her ailments, where she died on 27 March 1546. At the death of Leonor de Castro, her husband, Francis Borja, saddened, resigned his goods and possessions in favor of his children, yielded the nobility titles and went to Rome, where in June, 1546, he would enter in the Society of Jesus.

== Issue ==
By his husband, Leonor had eight children, five sons and three daughters:

- Carlos, 5th Duke de Gandía (1530-1592). In 1548 he married Magdalena de Centelles y Cardona and had four sons and three daughters:
  - Francisco Tomas de Borja y Centelles, 6th Duke de Gandía (1551-1595). In 1572 he married Joana de Fernandez y Velasco and had six sons and two daughters, plus an illegitimate son and an illegitimate daughter:
    - Íñigo de Borja y Velasco (1575-1622)
    - Gaspar de Borja y Velasco (1580-1645)
    - Baltasar de Borja y Velasco (1586-1622)
- Isabel de Borja y Castro (1532-1558). In 1548 she married Francisco Gomez de Sandonal y Rojas and had a son:
  - Francisco Gómez de Sandoval, 1st Duke of Lerma (1553-1625)
    - Juana Gómez de Sandoval (d. 1624)
      - Luisa de Guzmán (1613-1666)
- Juan de Borja y Castro (1533-1606). In 1552 he married Lorenza de Onaz y Loyola, had four daughters and widowed in 1575. He remarried Francisca de Aragon y Barredo and had five sons:
  - Francisco de Borja y Aragón, prince of Squillace (1581-1658)
- Alvar de Borja y Castro (1534-1594). He married his niece Elvira de Enriquez y Borja (daughter of Juana) and had two sons and four daughters.
- Juana Francisca de Borja y Castro (b. 1536). In 1550 she married Juan de Enriquez y Almansa y Rojas and had a daughter, Elvira de Enriquez y Borja.
- Ferran de Borja y Castro (b. 1537). He married Violante de Armendia and had a son:
  - Juan Buenaventura de Borja y Armendia (1564-1628)
- Dorotea de Borja y Castro (1538-1552), nun.
- Alfons de Borja y Castro (b. 1539). In 1567 he married Leonor de Norona, without issue.

== See also ==
- House of Borgia
- Route of the Borgias

== Bibliography ==
- Sebastián Lozano, Jorge (2011): San Francisco de Borja, Grande de España, Arte y espiritualidad en la cultura de los siglos XVI y XVII. pp. 67–90. (in Spanish)
