= Diego Carrillo de Mendoza, 1st Marquess of Gelves =

Mexican politician

The Most Excellent The Marquess of Gélves KOS
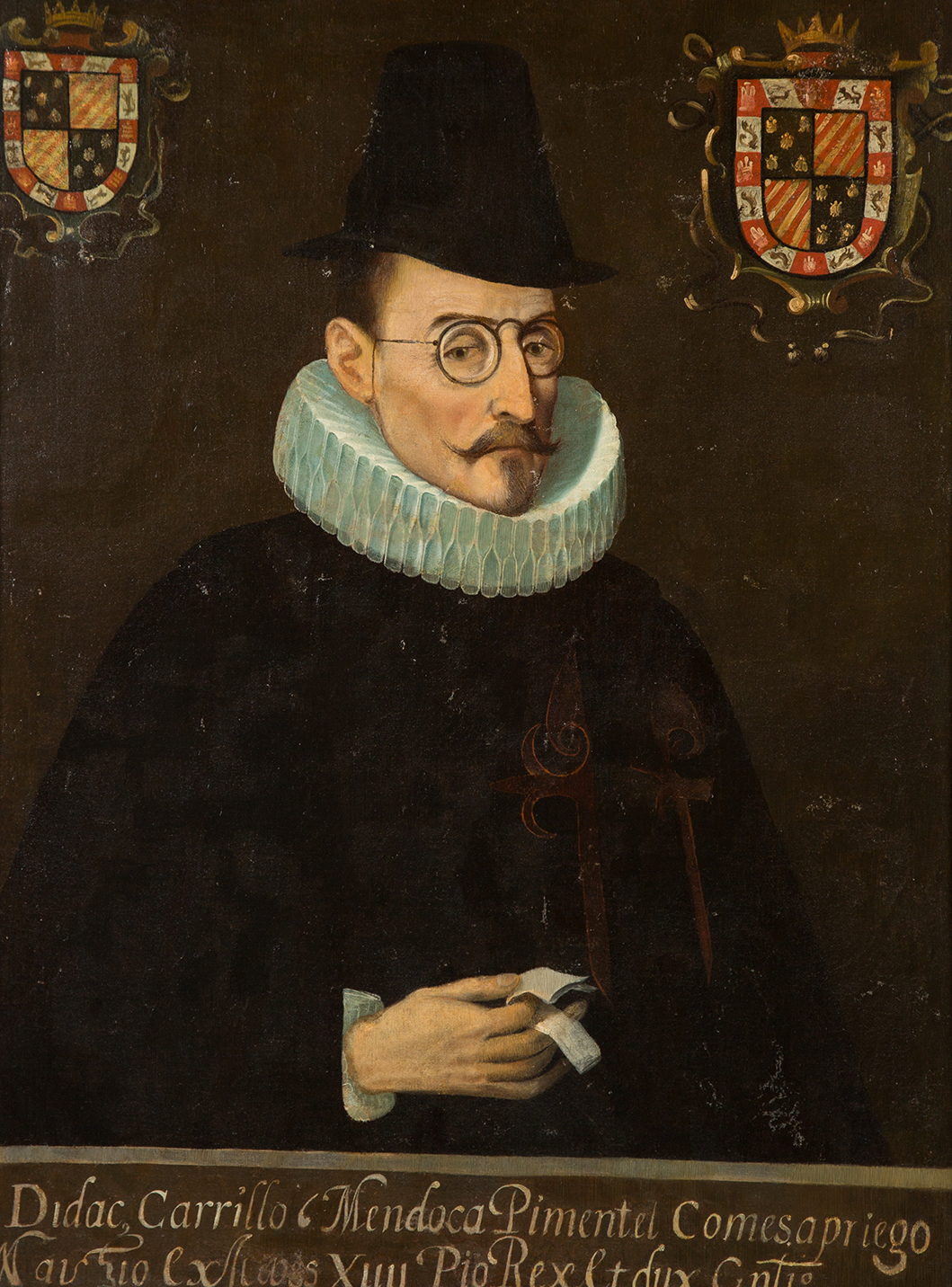

Viceroy of New Spain
- In office September 21, 1621 – November 1, 1624
- Monarch: Philip IV
- Valido: Baltasar de Zúñiga; Count-Duke of Olivares
- Preceded by: Diego Fernández de Córdoba
- Succeeded by: Rodrigo Pacheco

Personal details
- Born: c. 1570 Valladolid, Spain
- Died: c. 1631 Madrid, Spain

Don Diego Carrillo de Mendoza y Pimentel, 1st Marquess of Gélves (Spanish: Diego Pimentel y Toledo, primer marqués de Gélves y conde consorte de Priego, capitán-general de la caballería de Milán, Asistente de Sevilla, caballero de Santiago y comendador de Villanueva de la Fuente) (unknown year, Aragon – 1631) was a Spanish cavalry general, viceroy of Aragon, and viceroy of New Spain. He held the latter position from September 21, 1621 to January 15, 1624 or November 1, 1624.

== Early life ==
Carrillo de Mendoza was born in Valladolid. He joined the army at an early age, where he distinguished himself. He commanded the Spanish cavalry in the invasion of Portugal in 1580, and served in Milan and Sicily. He spent three years in a Dutch prison.

He was governor of Seville; Captain General of the Andalusian coast and of Milan; and Viceroy, Governor, and Captain General of Aragon.

== Viceroy of New Spain ==
Arriving in New Spain in 1621, he found the administration in a bad state and immediately took steps to improve the moral standards of the functionaries. He organized detachments of armed highway patrolmen and assigned them to the principal highways to combat an epidemic of robbery. He authorized the immediate hanging of robbers caught in the act.

He bought grain and distributed it to the poor of the capital and its environs to combat the continuing drought and famine. He opposed the monopoly of the grain merchants, formed to drive up prices. This made him enemies. Also in his first year, he founded a chair of surgery at the university. This chair was first occupied by the Mexican-born doctor Cristóbal Hidalgo y Bandabal (d. 1660).

On March 7, 1623, the viceroy ordered work on the drainage system of the Valley of Mexico to cease, because he considered it costly and unlikely to be effective. He also ordered the destruction of the dike that diverted the Río Cuautitlán from entering the lakes around Mexico City. However, the next rainy season led again to large floods, many lost lives and much damage. This caused a considerable loss of the viceroy's prestige.

== Conflict with the archbishop ==
As the result of numerous complaints concerning venality and partiality, Viceroy Carrillo de Mendoza began an investigation of the archbishop of Mexico, Juan Pérez de la Serna. The viceroy instructed the archbishop not to grant divorces so readily, not to accept gifts, and not to charge high prices in the butcher shop the archbishop owned.

This caused animosity between the two, but the final break occurred because of a court case against Melchor Pérez de Veraiz, corregidor of Mexico City. Pérez de Veraiz was accused of monopolizing maize and keeping illicit granaries. He fled to the convent of Santo Domingo to avoid arrest. The judges posted guards around the convent, but the archbishop, invoking ecclesiastical immunity, excommunicated the judges, their clerks and the soldiers. The Audiencia appealed to the bishop of Puebla, the apostolic judge in such cases, and he ordered the excommunicated absolved. Archbishop Pérez de la Serna responded with a general interdict, closing all the churches in the capital for some days.

On January 11, 1624, the archbishop in his sedan chair made an appearance at the viceregal palace, in front of an excited crowd. Also present was the viceroy, who together with the Audiencia, had determined to depose the archbishop. The archbishop responded by excommunicating the viceroy and the members of the Audiencia. He reiterated the interdict and ordered clerics on horseback to ride the streets of the capital shouting "¡Viva Cristo!" and "¡Muera el mal gobierno!" ("Long live Christ!" and "Death to bad government!").

Thereupon the viceroy arrested the archbishop and ordered him escorted back to Spain. Three of the members of the Audiencia revoked the order deposing the archbishop, but the viceroy took prisoners. All of this provoked a popular riot on January 15, 1624 in front of the viceregal palace demanding the resignation of the viceroy. The rioters entered and partially burned the palace. That afternoon Archbishop Pérez, who in the meantime had been allowed to escape, proclaimed Carrillo de Mendoza deposed as viceroy, and nominated Licenciado Pedro Gabiría as captain general. That night the viceroy, on the point of being killed by the mob, disguised himself as a servant and fled to the church of San Francisco, where he remained, surrounded by guards. "Although the crown briefly reinstated Gelves before replacing him, the marqués was in effect the first Mexican viceroy overthrown by popular revolt."

In 1625, Carillo de Mendoza returned to Spain, where he had an audience with King Philip IV and attempted to justify his decisions as viceroy. The king approved some of the measures he had taken against the archbishop, but rejected others.

Pérez de la Serna continued as archbishop of Mexico until the arrival of the next viceroy, Rodrigo Pacheco, 3rd Marquis of Cerralvo in November, 1624. Then, he was assigned to the Spanish diocese of Zamora. Corregidor Melchor Pérez de Veraiz was eventually absolved of the charges made against him. Carillo de Mendoza died in 1631 in Madrid.

Government offices
Preceded by The Marquess of Aitona	Viceroy of Aragon; 1617–1620	Succeeded by Fernando de Borja y Aragón
Preceded by The Marquess of Guadalcázar	Viceroy of New Spain; 1621–1624	Succeeded by The Marquess of Cerralvo
Spanish nobility
New title	Marquess of Gelves; 1615–1631	Succeeded by
