= Madrigalejo =

Madrigalejo, Spain
- municipality
- Flag Coat of arms
- Interactive map of Madrigalejo, Spain
- Coordinates: 39°08′N 05°37′W
- Country: Spain
- Autonomous community: Extremadura
- Province: Cáceres
- Municipality: Madrigalejo

Area
  - Total: 101 km^{2} (39 sq mi)
- Elevation: 294 m (965 ft)

Population (2025-01-01)
  - Total: 1,710
  - Density: 16.9/km^{2} (43.9/sq mi)
- Time zone: UTC+1 (CET)
  - Summer (DST): UTC+2 (CEST)

Madrigalejo is a municipality located in the province of Cáceres, Extremadura, Spain. According to the 2006 census (INE), the municipality has a population of 2075 inhabitants. Ferdinand II of Aragon died in this village in 1516.

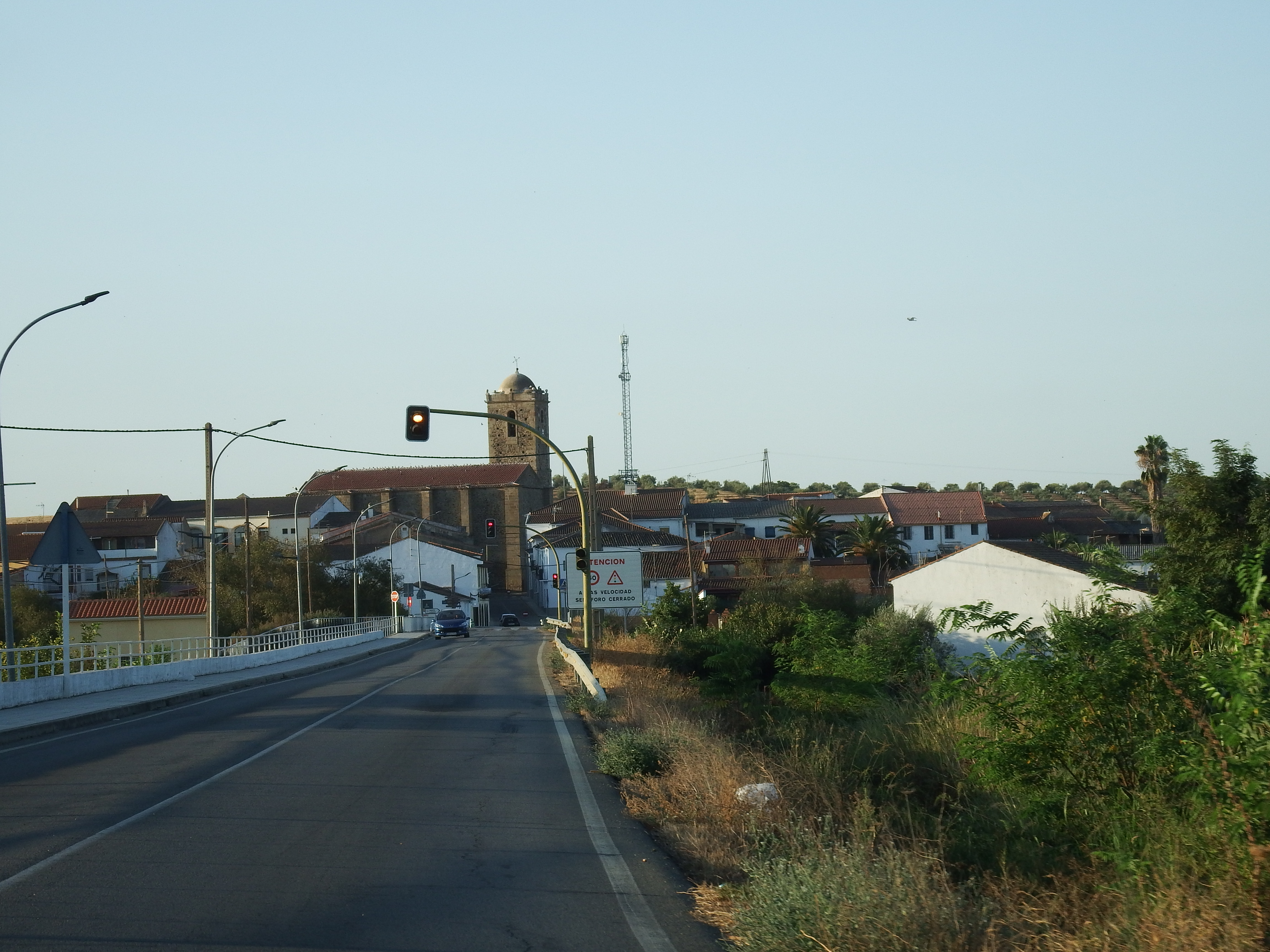
View of Madrigalejo

== See also ==
- List of municipalities in Cáceres
