= List of viceroys of Aragon =

This is a list of viceroys (or lieutenants) of the Kingdom of Aragon.

- Alonso de Aragón, archbishop of Zaragoza 1517–1520
- Juan de Lanuza y Torrellas 1520–1535
- Beltrán de la Cueva, 3rd Duke of Alburquerque 1535–1539
- Pedro Manrique de Luna y de Urrea, count of Morata de Jalón 1539–1554
- Diego Hurtado de Mendoza y de la Cerda, prince of Melito 1554–1564
- Ferran d'Aragón i de Gurrea, Archbishop of Zaragoza 1566–1575
- Artal de Aragón y Luna, count of Sástago 1575–1588
- Íñigo López de Mendoza y Manrique de Luna, marquis of Almenara 1588
- Miguel Martinez de Luna y Mendoza, count of Morata de Jalón 1592–1593
- Diego Fernández de Cabrera Bobadilla y Mendoza, count of Chincón 1593–1601
- Beltrán de la Cueva y Castilla, duke of Alburquerque 1601–1602
- Ascanio Colonna, cardinal 1602–1604
- Tomás de Borja y Castro, Archbishop of Zaragoza 1606-1610
- Gastón de Moncada, 2nd Marquis of Aitona 1610–1615
- Diego Carrillo de Mendoza, 1st Marquis of Gelves 1617–1620
- Fernando de Borja y Aragón, count of Mayalde 1621–1632
- Girolamo Carraffa e Carrascciolo, marquis de Montenegro 1632–1636
- Pedro Fajardo de Requesens de Zuñiga y Pimentel, marquis of Los Velez 1635–1638
- Francesco Maria Carafa, Duke of Nocera 1639–1640
- Enrique de Pimentel y Moscoso, marquis of Tavara 1641
- Gian Giacomo Teodoro Trivulzio, prince of Trivulzio, cardinal 1642–1645
- Bernardino Fernández de Velasco, 6th Duke of Frías 1645–1647
- Francisco de Melo, count of Assmar 1647–1649
- Francisco Fernández de Castro Andrade de Portugal e Legnano de Gattinara, count of Lemos and count of Andrade 1649–1653
- Fabrizzio Pignatelli, prince of Nòia, duke (married with the duchess) of Monteleone 1654–1657
- Niccolò Ludovisi, prince of Piombino and Venosa 1659–1662
- Ferran de Borja d'Aragón i Barreto, count of Mayalde 1662–1664
- Francisco de Idiáquez de Butrón Mogica y de Álava, duke of Ciudad Real 1664–1667
- Ettore Pignatelli d'Aragona e Cortés, duke (married with the duchess) of Terranova, prince of Noia, duke of Moteleone 1668
- Pedro Pablo Ximénez de Urrea Fernández de Heredia y Zapata, count of Aranda 1668–1669
- Juan Jose de Austria 1669–1676
- Lorenzo Onofrio Colonna e Gioeni-Cardona, Prince of Paliano 1678–1681
- Jaime Fernández de Hixar-Silva Sarmiento de la Cerda, duke of Hixar 1681–1687
- Carlo Antonio Spinelli, prince of Cariati, duke of Seminara 1688–1691
- Baltasar de los Cobos Luna Sarmiento de Mendoza Zúñiga y Manrique, marquis of Camarasa 1692–1693
- Antonio Ibáñez de la Riva Herrera, Archbishop of Zaragoza 1693–1693
- Juan Manuel Fernández Pacheco Cabrera y Bobadilla, marquis of Villena and duke of Escalona 1693–1695
- Domenico del Giudice e Palagno, duke of Giovenazzo, prince of Cellamare 1695
- Baltasar de los Cobos Luna Sarmiento de Mendoza Zúñiga y Manrique, marquis of Camarasa 1696–1699 (second time)
- Baltasar Manrique de Mendoza de los Cobos y Luna, 5th Marquess of Camarasa 1699–1702
- Antonio Ibáñez de la Riva Herrera, Archbishop of Zaragoza 1702–1707 (second time)
