= Charterhouse of Aula Dei =

Carthusian monastery in Zaragoza, Spain

Coordinates: 41°43′53.67″N 0°48′44.71″W

The Charterhouse of Aula Dei (Spanish: Cartuja de Aula Dei) is a Carthusian monastery, or charterhouse, located about 10 kilometers north of the city of Zaragoza in Aragon, north-eastern Spain. It was declared a national monument on 16 February 1983.

== 16th–20th centuries ==
The charterhouse was founded in 1563 by Hernando de Aragón, Archbishop of Zaragoza and grandson of the Catholic Monarchs. The architecture of the enclosed monastery was designed by Martín de Miteza to house thirty-six monks, a complement three times larger than the usual Carthusian community. This monastery, like most in Spain, was closed in 1836, and the monks expelled. The monastery was re-purchased in 1901 by the Carthusians for the exiled French communities of Valbonne and Vauclaire Charterhouses, who arrived in that year in Spain and occupied Aula Dei in 1902.

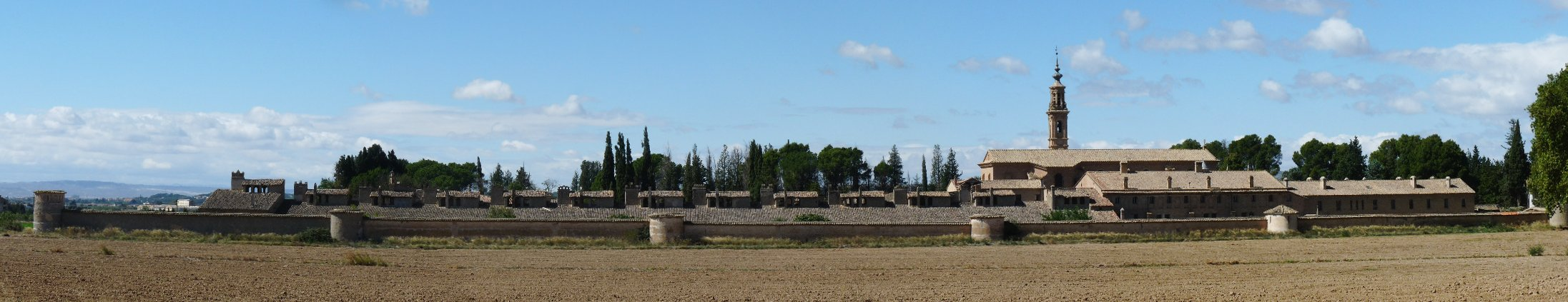
View of the Charterhouse.

== Frescoes ==
The major interior decoration consists of a cycle of 11 large frescoes round the monastic church on the Life of the Virgin painted between 1772 and 1774 by Francisco Goya. Only 7 of the original 11 frescoes now remain. The interior of the church, as would be expected for an enclosed community, was open until August 2012 to selected visitors only for a few hours each month. Because of the building's history of limited access, the frescoes remain largely unstudied, despite being perhaps Goya's most impressive early work.

== 21st century ==
The Carthusian monks left the monastery in August 2012, but asked the Chemin Neuf Community to come and continue their mission of praying and welcoming the visitors. As a non-cloistered community, Chemin Neuf is able to give access to the frescoes of Goya weekly (instead of monthly).
