= Pedro Manrique de Lara (bishop) =

Italian Roman Catholic prelate

Most Reverend Pedro Manrique de Lara
- Archbishop of Zaragoza
- Church: Catholic Church
- Archdiocese: Diocese of Zaragoza
- In office: 1611–1615
- Predecessor: Tomás de Borja y Castro
- Successor: Pedro González de Mendoza
- Previous post: Bishop of Tortosa (1601–1611)

Personal details
- Born: 1553 Crotone, Italy
- Died: 7 June 1615 (age 62) Zaragoza, Spain

Pedro Manrique de Lara, O.S.A. (1553–1615) was a Roman Catholic prelate who served as Archbishop of Zaragoza (1611–1615) and Bishop of Tortosa (1601–1611).

== Biography ==
Pedro Manrique de Lara was born in Crotone, Italy in 1553 and ordained a priest in the Order of Saint Augustine. On 12 February 1601, he was appointed during the papacy of Pope Clement VIII as Bishop of Tortosa.
At the end of 1610 King Philip III named Pedro Manrique Viceroy of Catalonia. The bishop moved to Barcelona, and was mainly concerned with the problems arising from the departure of the Catalan Moors. On 8 April 1611, he was appointed during the papacy of Pope Paul V as Archbishop of Zaragoza. In August 1611, Manrique left Barcelona for Zaragoza and took possession of his new position on 28 August. He served as Archbishop of Zaragoza until his death on 7 June 1615.

== External links and additional sources ==
- Cheney, David M. "Archdiocese of Zaragoza". Catholic-Hierarchy.org. (for Chronology of Bishops) ^{[self-published]}
- Chow, Gabriel. "Metropolitan Archdiocese of Zaragoza (Spain)". GCatholic.org. (for Chronology of Bishops) ^{[self-published]}

Catholic Church titles
Preceded by Gaspar Punter	Bishop of Tortosa; 1601–1611	Succeeded by Isidoro Aliaga
Preceded by Tomás de Borja y Castro	Archbishop of Zaragoza; 1611–1615	Succeeded by Pedro González de Mendoza
