= Diego Hurtado de Mendoza y de la Cerda =

Spanish nobleman

Diego Hurtado de Mendoza y de la Cerda, 1st Duke of Francavilla (November 3, 1489, Madrid – March 19, 1578, Toledo) was a Spanish nobleman.

== Biography ==
He became viceroy of Aragon in 1553 or 1554 – 1564, Chairman of the Council of Italy in 1558, and viceroy of Catalonia. He was the grandson of Cardinal Mendoza and son of Diego Hurtado de Mendoza y Lemos and Ana de la Cerda y Castro.
He was the 1st Duke of Francavilla.

=== As viceroy of Aragon ===
In 1553 or 1554, he was appointed Lieutenant General of the Kingdom of Aragon, a move that already constituted a serious abuse of power, since, according to the local law, only natives of that Kingdom could hold this position. King Philip II of Spain, during this period, sought to impose the hegemony of the Hispanic Monarchy over the institutions of the non-Castilian kingdoms, and in this respect, Diego Hurtado served the monarch without understanding or appreciating the unique system of the Fueros of Aragon, which he repeatedly violated. After two years, he had to hastily leave Zaragoza, although the king did not appoint a new Lieutenant General until 1566, when he was replaced by the Archbishop of Zaragoza, Hernando de Aragón.

In 1555, violating a local law of injunction and the Privilege of Manifestation, he had ordered the execution of a blacksmith from Zuera accused of horse smuggling. This was seen as an attack on their rights and liberties, provoking widespread protest and a trial before the Justice of Aragon initiated by the General Council of the Kingdom of Aragon. After Diego excused himself on behalf of the king, the Aragonese deputies halted the legal proceedings. However, the following year, he executed another prisoner protected by the right or Privilege of Manifestation. The patience of the Aragonese was now exhausted, and Diego Hurtado de Mendoza was forced to take refuge in the Aljafería Palace to save his life, quickly leaving the city on the Ebro River.

Government offices
Preceded by Pedro Manrique de Luna	Viceroy of Aragon; 1554–1556	Succeeded by Hernando de Aragón
Preceded by Marquis of Villafranca	Viceroy of Catalonia; 1564–1571	Succeeded by Fernando de Toledo
