= Francisco de Moncada y Cardona =

Spanish noble

Francisco de Moncada y Cardona (Mequinenza, 9 October 1532 – Valencia, 12 November 1594) was a Spanish noble from the 16th century.

== Biography ==
He was the son of Juan de Moncada y de Tolça, 1st Count of Aitona and Ana de Cardona, daughter of Fernando Ramon Folch, 2nd Duke of Cardona

In 1574 he became IX Count of Osona and Grandee of Spain. In October 1581, his County of Aitona was promoted to the Marquisate of Aitona by King Philip II of Spain. He became Viceroy of Catalonia between 1580–81 and Viceroy of Valencia from 1581 until his death.

He married Lucrecia Gralla, señora de Subirat y de Esponella, and had 17 children, including

- Gastón, his successor.
- Juan de Moncada, Archbishop of Tarragona.

Government offices
Preceded by Fernando de Toledo	Viceroy of Catalonia; 1580–1581	Succeeded by Carlo d'Aragona Tagliavia
Preceded by Pedro Manrique de Lara	Viceroy of Valencia; 1581–1595	Succeeded by Marquis of Denia
