= Alonso de Aragón =

16th-century Catholic Archbishop in Spain

- Archbishop of Zaragoza; Archbishop of Valencia
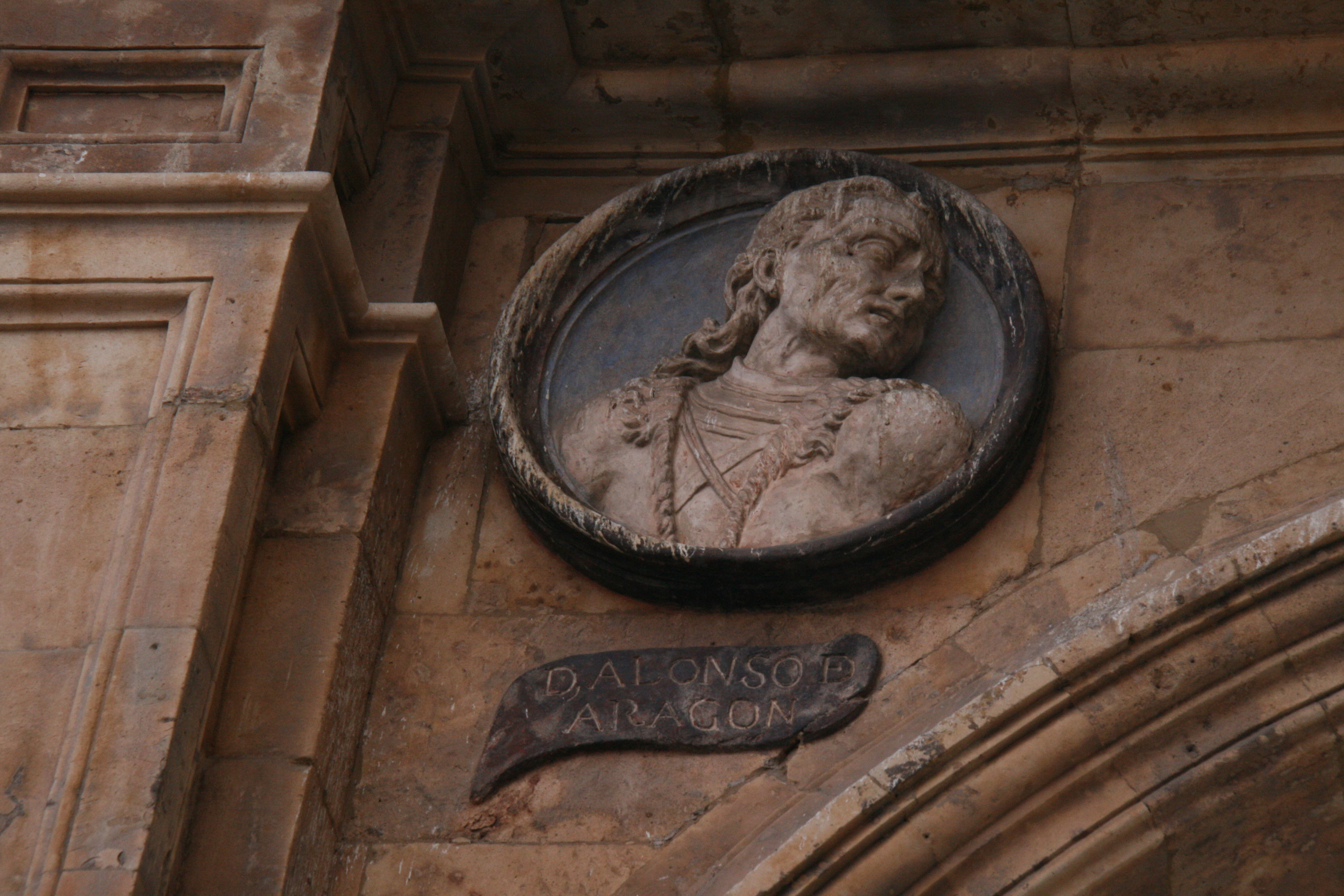
- Medaillon at Plaza Mayor, Salamanca
- Archdiocese: Archdiocese of Zaragoza
- Appointed: 14 August 1478
- Term ended: 24 February 1520
- Predecessor: Ausias de Puggio
- Successor: Juan de Aragón

Personal details
- Born: 1468 Cervera, Spain
- Died: 24 February 1520 (aged 52) Lécera
- Buried: La Seo Cathedral
- Parents: Ferdinand II of Aragon; Aldonza Ruiz de Ivorra
- Children: Juan de Aragón y de Guerrea; Hernando, Archbishop of Zaragoza more...

Alonso de Aragón or Alfonso de Aragón (1468 – 24 February 1520) was Archbishop of Zaragoza, Archbishop of Valencia and Lieutenant General of Aragon. Born in Cervera, he was an illegitimate son of Ferdinand II of Aragon by Catalan noblewoman Aldonza Ruiz de Ivorra (1454–1513). In his youth his tutor was Antonio Geraldini, brother of the humanist scholar Alessandro Geraldini.

== Ecclesiastical career ==
Alonso was more a politician than a clergyman. He was five years old when his father Ferdinand and grandfather King John II of Aragon decided he would enter the Church. When Juan de Aragón, Archbishop of Zaragoza and John's illegitimate son, died in 1475, John and Ferdinand chose Alonso to succeed him. Pope Sixtus IV thought that he was too young and appointed Cardinal Ausiàs Despuig. In 1478, Sixtus yielded to their pressure, deposed Ausias, and appointed Alonso as archbishop on 14 August. However, he was not ordained as a priest until 7 November 1501, a day before being ordained as a bishop.

On 23 January 1512, Alonso was also appointed Archbishop of Valencia. He was enthroned as such on 4 April 1512.

== Political career ==
His father made him Lieutenant General of the Kingdom of Naples in 1507, to replace Gonzalo Fernández de Córdoba. In 1512, he was in command of the troops that conquered Tudela in the Spanish conquest of Iberian Navarre.

When his father died in 1516, the Archbishop was appointed by his will as Lieutenant General of Aragon and de facto ruler of Aragon, due to the alleged insanity of his half-sister, Queen Joanna, who inherited the crown. When Joanna's son and co-ruler, Charles I, arrived in November 1518, the Archbishop was confirmed as Lieutenant General of Aragon. He died two years later in Lécera.

Aragón also realised important modifications on the La Seo Cathedral, where he was buried.

== Issue ==
Despite being Archbishop, Alonso had seven children with Ana de Gurrea (1470–1527), including:

- Juan (1498–1530), next Archbishop of Zaragoza
- Hernando (1498–1575), also Archbishop of Zaragoza and Viceroy of Aragón
- Antonio (died 1552), Lord of Quinto
- Juana (died 1520), married to Juan de Borja, 3rd Duke of Gandía and mother of Saint Francis Borgia
- Martin, Lord of Argavieso
- Ana, married the 5th and the 6th Duke of Medina Sidonia

== Arms ==
Former arms of Alonso of Aragon

Arms as archbishop
(and Lieutenant General)

Catholic Church titles
Preceded by Ausias de Puggio	Archbishop of Zaragoza; 14 August 1478 – 24 February 1520	Succeeded by Juan de Aragón
Preceded by Pedro-Luis de Borja	Archbishop of Valencia; 23 January 1512 – 24 February 1520	Succeeded by Érard de La Marck
Political offices
New title	Lieutenant General of Aragon; 1517 – 24 February 1520	Succeeded by Juan de Lanuza y Torrellas
