= Fernando de Toledo =

Spanish nobleman

Hernando de Toledo (c. 1528–1591) was a Spanish nobleman.

He was the illegitimate and first son of Don Fernando Álvarez de Toledo, 3rd Duke of Alba, "The Iron Duke", who fathered Hernando de Toledo upon the daughter of a miller of La Aldehuela, in the province of Ávila, Spain.

Not until 1546, when Hernando was nineteen years old, did the duke recognize Hernando as his son. This later became the subject of a comedy written by the great Spanish playwright Félix Lope de Vega y Carpio; the title of the play, "Más mal hay en La Aldegüela de lo que sueña" means approximately, "There are worse things in Aldehuela than you have dreamt of".

Hernando Toledo was a prior of the Sovereign Military Order of Malta in Castile and León. He was Captain General of the cavalry of Flanders and Portugal, member of the Council of State, and (from 1571 to 1580) Viceroy of Catalonia, succeeding Diego Hurtado de Mendoza y de la Cerda (also known as Diego de Mendoza y de la Cerda, 2nd Count of Mélito, 1st Duke of Francavilla), who had been viceroy from 1564 to 1571.

== Sources ==
- Hobbs, Nicolas (2007). "Grandes de España" (in Spanish).
- Instituto de Salazar y Castro. Elenco de Grandezas y Titulos Nobiliarios Españoles (in Spanish). periodic publication.

Government offices
Preceded by The Duke of Francavilla	Viceroy of Catalonia; 1571–1580	Succeeded by The Marquis of Aitona
