= Mayalde =

Coordinates: 41°15′N 5°48′W

Mayalde, Spain
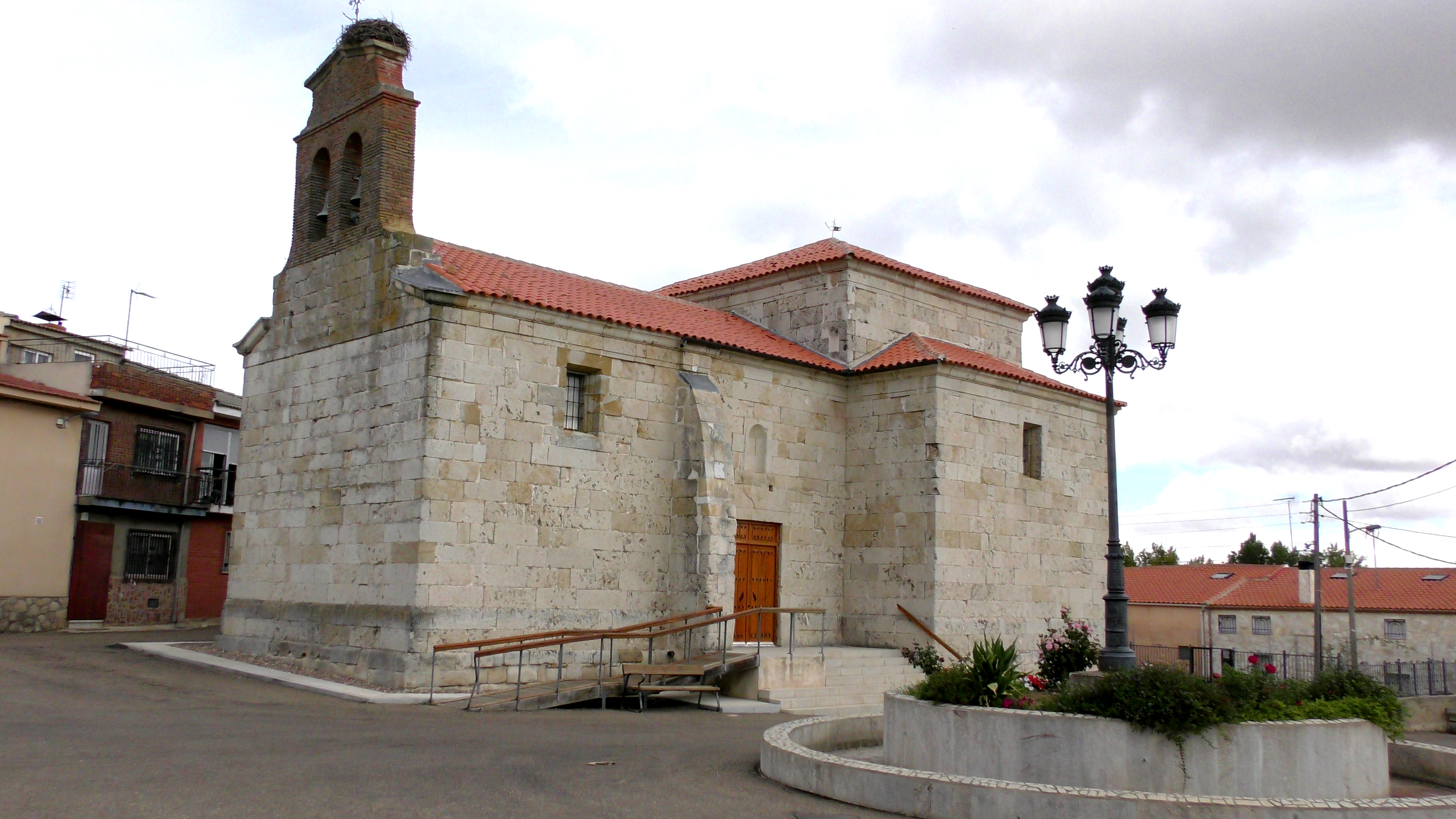

- Flag Coat of arms
- Interactive map of Mayalde, Spain
- Country: Spain
- Autonomous community: Castile and León
- Province: Zamora
- Municipality: Mayalde

Area
  - Total: 43 km^{2} (17 sq mi)

Population (2025-01-01)
  - Total: 140
  - Density: 3.3/km^{2} (8.4/sq mi)
- Time zone: UTC+1 (CET)
  - Summer (DST): UTC+2 (CEST)

Mayalde is a municipality located in the province of Zamora, Castile and León, Spain. According to the 2004 census (INE), the municipality has a population of 232 inhabitants.
