= Gastón de Moncada, 2nd Marquis of Aitona =

Spanish noble (1554–1626)

Gastón de Moncada y Gralla-Despla, 2nd Marquis of Aitona (1554–1626) was a member of Spanish nobility who was the Viceroy of Sardinia (1590–1595) and the Viceroy of Aragon (1610-1615).

== Biography ==
He was one of the 17 children of the 2nd Count of Aitona Francisco de Moncada y Folch de Cardona, 1st Marquis of Aitona. His grandfather was Juan de Moncada y de Tolça, 11th Baronet.

In 1590, he was appointed Viceroy of Sardinia, a post he would hold until 1595.
Between 1606 and 1609, he was Spanish Ambassador to the Holy See.

Back in the Iberian Peninsula, and already under the reign of Philip III, he served as Viceroy of Aragon, between 1610 and 1615, replacing Archbishop Tomás de Borja y Castro. During his viceroyalty the Expulsion of the Moriscos took place, a measure that was to have disastrous repercussions for the Aragonese economy and society.

Once his Aragonese period was over, he returned to Madrid, where he still served in the final years of the reign of Philip III in the Councils of State and War. After a long political career, he died on 24 January 1626.

=== Marriage and children ===
He married Catalina de Moncada y Bou, baronesa de Callosa, and had several children, including :

- Francisco de Moncada, 3rd Marquis of Aitona, (1586–1635) interim Governor of the Spanish Netherlands.
- Pedro, Bishop of Gerona.

Government offices
| Preceded by Miguel de Gurrea y Moncada | Viceroy of Sardinia; 1590–1595 | Succeeded by Antonio Coloma y Saa |
| Preceded by Tomás de Borja y Castro | Viceroy of Aragon; 1610-1615 | Succeeded by Marquis of Gelves |
