= Lécera =

- municipality
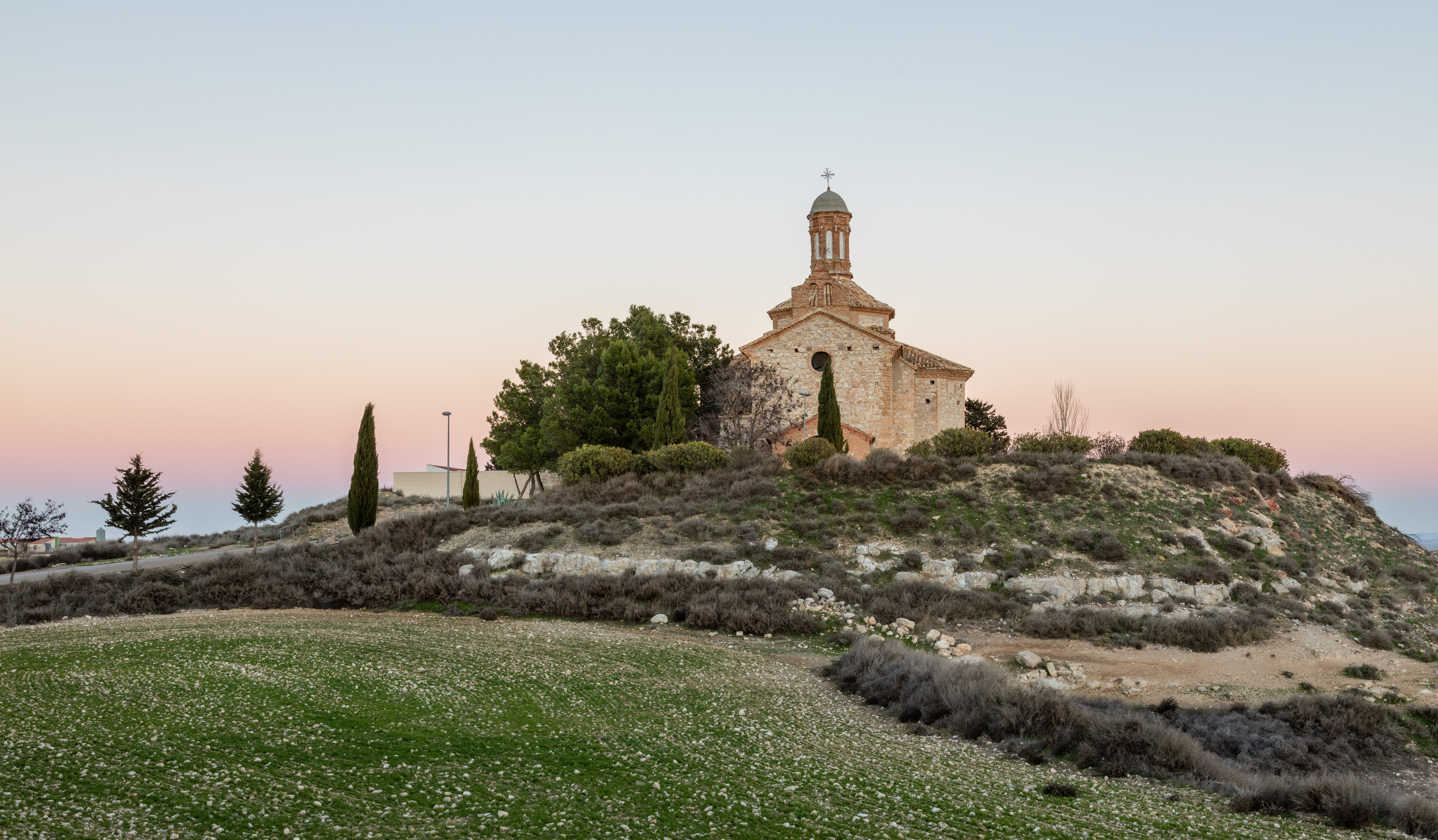

- Flag Coat of arms

- Location within Aragon Location within Spain Location within Europe
- Country: Spain
- Autonomous community: Aragon
- Province: Zaragoza

Area
  - Total: 109 km^{2} (42 sq mi)

Population (2025-01-01)
  - Total: 578
  - Density: 5.30/km^{2} (13.7/sq mi)
- Time zone: UTC+1 (CET)
  - Summer (DST): UTC+2 (CEST)
- Climate: BSk

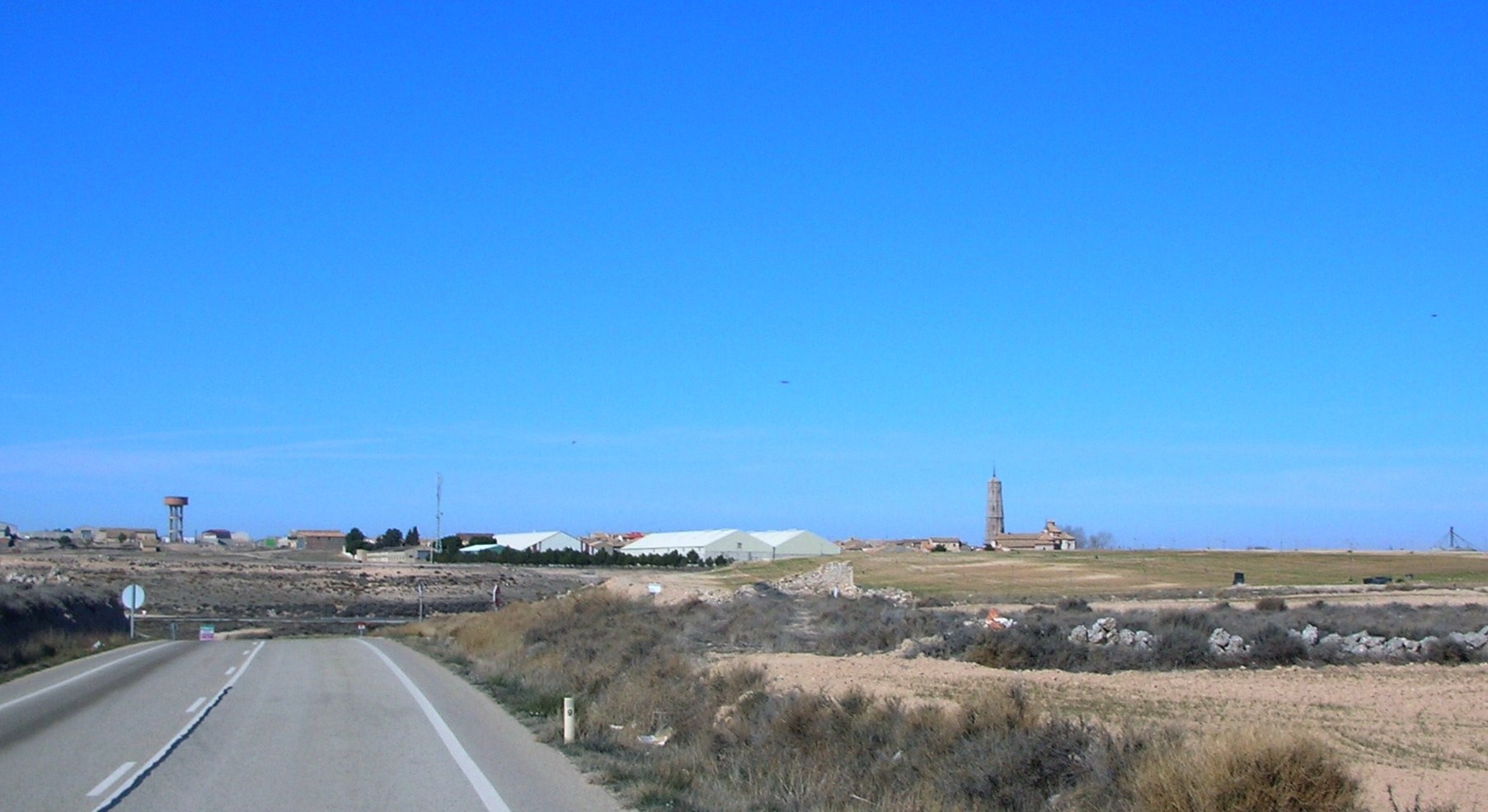
Lécera town; view from the east

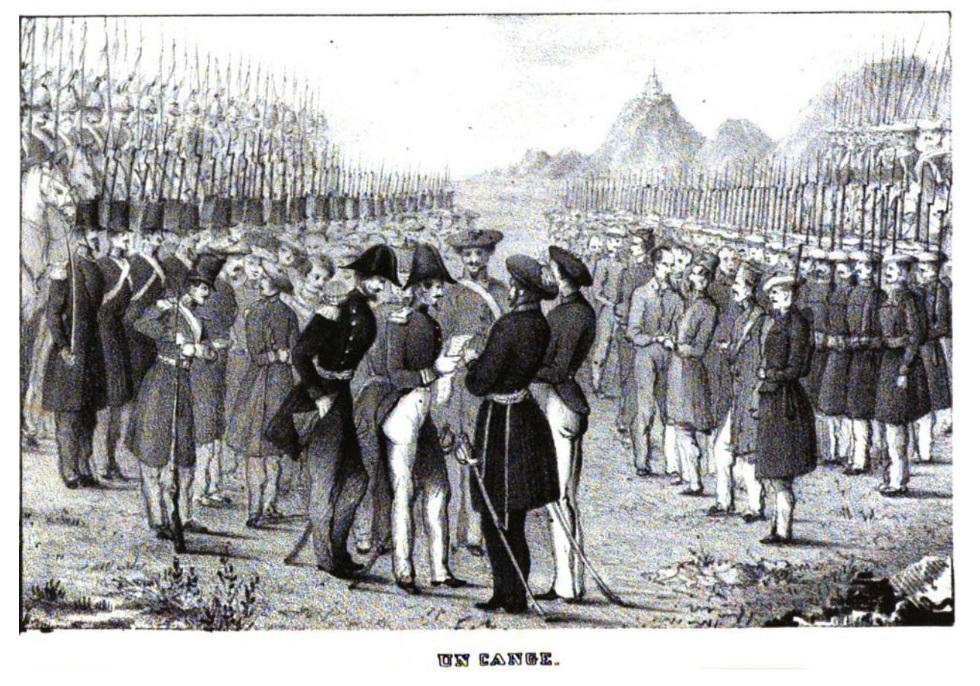
Exchange of prisoners of war following the Treaty of Lécera in 1839

Lécera is a municipality located in the Campo de Belchite comarca, province of Zaragoza, Aragon, Spain. According to the 2004 census (INE), the municipality has a population of 777 inhabitants.

== History ==
Lécera is known for the Treaty of Lécera (Tratado de Lécera or Convenio de Segura) between Generals Cabrera and Van-Halen that led to an exchange of prisoners of war in the First Carlist War.

== See also ==
- List of municipalities in Zaragoza
