= Aldonza Ruiz de Ivorra =

Spanish courtier

- Born: 1454; Cervera, Kingdom of Aragon, Crown of Aragon
- Died: 1513 (aged 58–59); Zaragoza, Kingdom of Aragon, Crown of Aragon
- Partner: Ferdinand II of Aragon
- Children: Alonso de Aragón

Aldonza Ruiz de Ivorra (1454–1513) was a Spanish courtier. She was the royal mistress of King Ferdinand II of Aragon, with whom she also had children, among them Alonso de Aragón. She was already the mistress of the king at the time of his marriage in 1468. She was married to a courtier, and attended court officially as the wife of her courtier-husband. She accompanied the king on his travels, often dressed as a man.

== Biography ==
Born in Cervera, the capital of the comarca of Segarra in 1454 to Pedro Roig i Alemany and Aldonza de Iborra. She was the lover of King Ferdinand II of Aragon before his marriage to Princess Isabella I of Castille. Her and Ferdinand's son, Alonso de Aragón, was Ferdinand's only son to outlive himself and his only extramarital son, and was the abbot of the Monastery of Montearagón from 1492 to 1520, Archbishop of Zaragoza, Archbishop of Valencia, and Viceroy of Aragon. Despite his position in the church, Alonso would go on to have seven children who in turn gave rise to many Spanish noble families.

It is said that Aldonza Ruiz de Ivorra was strikingly beautiful and would allegedly accompany Ferdinand II in public while dressed as a man.

== Family ==
Later, she married Francisco Galcerán de Castro y de Pinós y de Só y Carroç d'Arborea, VII Viscount of Ebol and Canet, Baron of Pinós and Mataplana. Together, they had two children:

- Francisco Galcerán de Castro Pinós y Roig, VIII Viscount of Ebol and Canet
- Juan Jordán de Castro Pinós y Roig, Spanish Prelate, abbot of San Pedro de Roda, Bishop of Agrigento, and governor of Castillo Sant'Angelo. He was made a Cardinal of the Catholic Church by Pope Alexander VI on February 19, 1496.
