= Ferdinand II of Aragon =

King of Aragon from 1479 to 1516

Ferdinand II
- Catholic King of the Spains (Note: In the papal bull Si convenit of 1496, Ferdinand II and Isabella I were named "King and Queen Catholics of the Spains (Rey y Reina Católicos de las Españas)".)
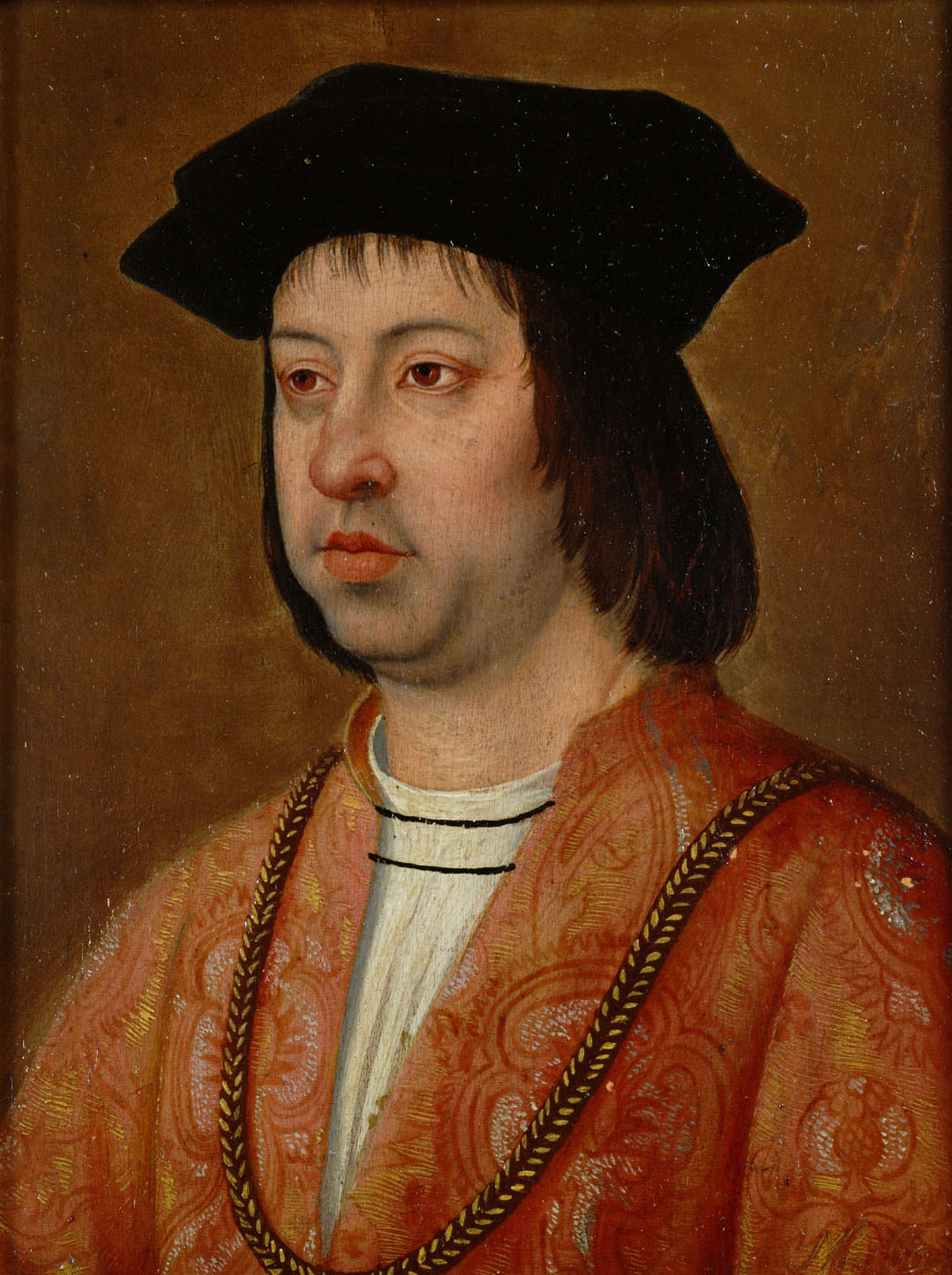
- Portrait by Michael Sittow

King of Aragon, Valencia, Sardinia, Majorca, and Count of Barcelona
- Reign: 20 January 1479 – 23 January 1516
- Predecessor: John II
- Successor: Joanna I

King of Castile and León
- Reign: 15 January 1475 – 26 November 1504
- Predecessor: Isabella I
- Successor: Joanna I
- Co-monarch: Isabella I

King of Sicily
- Reign: 10 June 1468 – 23 January 1516
- Predecessor: John II
- Successor: Joanna I

King of Naples
- Reign: 31 March 1504 – 23 January 1516
- Predecessor: Louis II
- Successor: Joanna III

King of Navarre
- Reign: 24 August 1512 – 23 January 1516
- Predecessor: John III and Catherine I
- Successor: Joanna III
- Born: 10 March 1452; Sos, Kingdom of Aragon
- Died: 23 January 1516 (aged 63); Madrigalejo, Extremadura, Crown of Castile
- Burial: Royal Chapel of Granada
- Spouses: Isabella I of Castile (m. 1469; died 1504) Germaine of Foix (m. 1506)
- Issue Detail: Isabella, Queen of Portugal; John, Prince of Asturias; Joanna, Queen of Castile and Aragon; Maria, Queen of Portugal; Catherine, Queen of England; John, Prince of Girona; Alonso, Archbishop of Zaragoza and Viceroy of Aragon (illegitimate); Alonso de Estrada, Governor and Captain General of New Spain (possible illegitimate son)
- House: Trastámara
- Father: John II of Aragon
- Mother: Juana Enríquez
- Religion: Roman Catholicism

Ferdinand II (Note: Also known by other regnal numerals: Ferdinand I of Navarre; Ferdinand III of Naples; Ferdinand V of Castile and León) (Note: Catalan: Ferran; Basque: Errando; Aragonese: Ferrando; Italian: Ferdinando; Spanish: Fernando) (10 March 1452 – 23 January 1516), also known as Ferdinand the Catholic, (Note: Spanish: Fernando el Católico, Catalan: Ferran el Catòlic) was King of Aragon from 1479 until his death in 1516. As the husband and co-ruler of Queen Isabella I of Castile, he was also King of Castile from 1475 to 1504 (as Ferdinand V). He reigned jointly with Isabella over a dynastically unified Spain; together, they are known as the Catholic Monarchs. Ferdinand is considered the de facto first king of Spain, and was described as such during his reign, even though, legally, Castile and Aragon remained two separate kingdoms until they were formally united by the Nueva Planta decrees issued between 1707 and 1716.

The Crown of Aragon that Ferdinand inherited in 1479 included the kingdoms of Aragon, Valencia, Mallorca, Sardinia, and Sicily, as well as the Principality of Catalonia. His marriage to Isabella is regarded as the "cornerstone in the foundation of the Spanish monarchy". They played a major role in the European colonization of the Americas, sponsoring the first voyage of Christopher Columbus in 1492. That year, the couple defeated Granada, the last Muslim state in Western Europe, thus completing the centuries-long Reconquista.

Following Isabella's death in 1504, the couple's daughter Joanna became queen of the Crown of Castile. That year, after a war with France, Ferdinand conquered the Kingdom of Naples. In 1507, he became regent of Castile on behalf of Joanna, who was alleged to be mentally unstable. In 1506, as part of a treaty with France, Ferdinand married Germaine of Foix, with whom he had no surviving children. In 1512, he conquered most of the Kingdom of Navarre, ruling all the territories comprising modern-day Spain until his death in 1516. He was nominally succeeded by his daughter Joanna, but power was soon assumed by her son Charles I (later Holy Roman Emperor Charles V).

== Early life ==
Ferdinand was born on 10 March 1452 in the town of Sos del Rey Católico, Kingdom of Aragon, as the son of John II of Aragon (whose family was a cadet branch of the House of Trastámara) by his second wife, Juana Enríquez.

== Marriage and accession ==
Ferdinand married Isabella, the half-sister and heir presumptive of Henry IV of Castile, on 19 October 1469 in Valladolid, Kingdom of Castile and Leon. Isabella also belonged to the royal House of Trastámara, and the two were second cousins by descent from John I of Castile. They were married with a clear prenuptial agreement on sharing power, and under the joint motto "tanto monta, monta tanto". He became jure uxoris King of Castile when Isabella succeeded her deceased brother in 1474. The two young monarchs were initially obliged to fight a civil war against the Queen of Portugal Joanna la Beltraneja, the purported daughter of Henry IV, and were swiftly successful. When Ferdinand succeeded his father as King of Aragon in 1479, the Crown of Castile and the various territories of the Crown of Aragon were united in a personal union. The various states were not formally administered as a single unit, but as separate political units under the same monarchs. (The legal merging of Aragon and Castile into a single Spain occurred under Philip V in 1707–1715.)

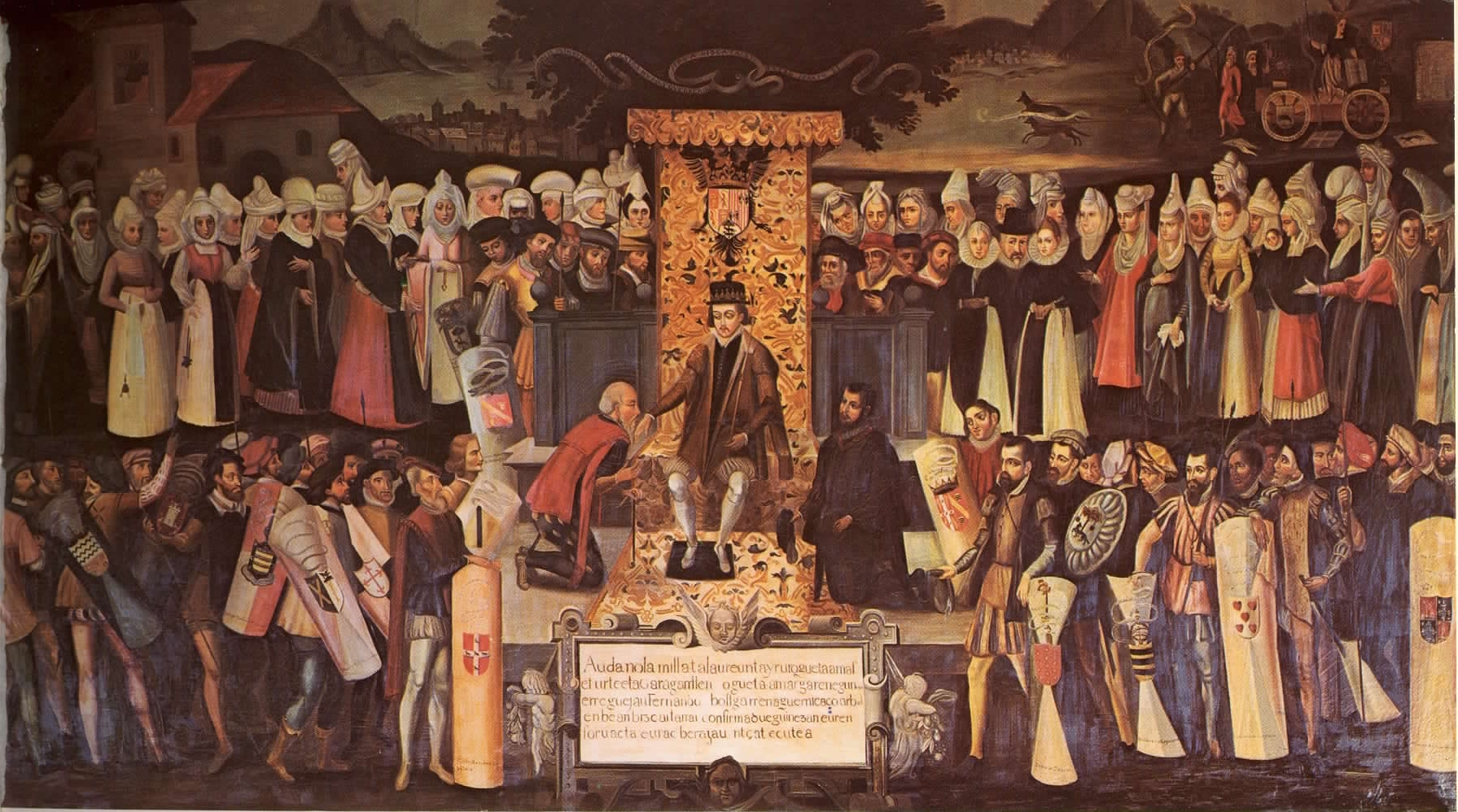
Ferdinand the Catholic swearing the fueros as the Lord of Biscay at Guernica in 1476

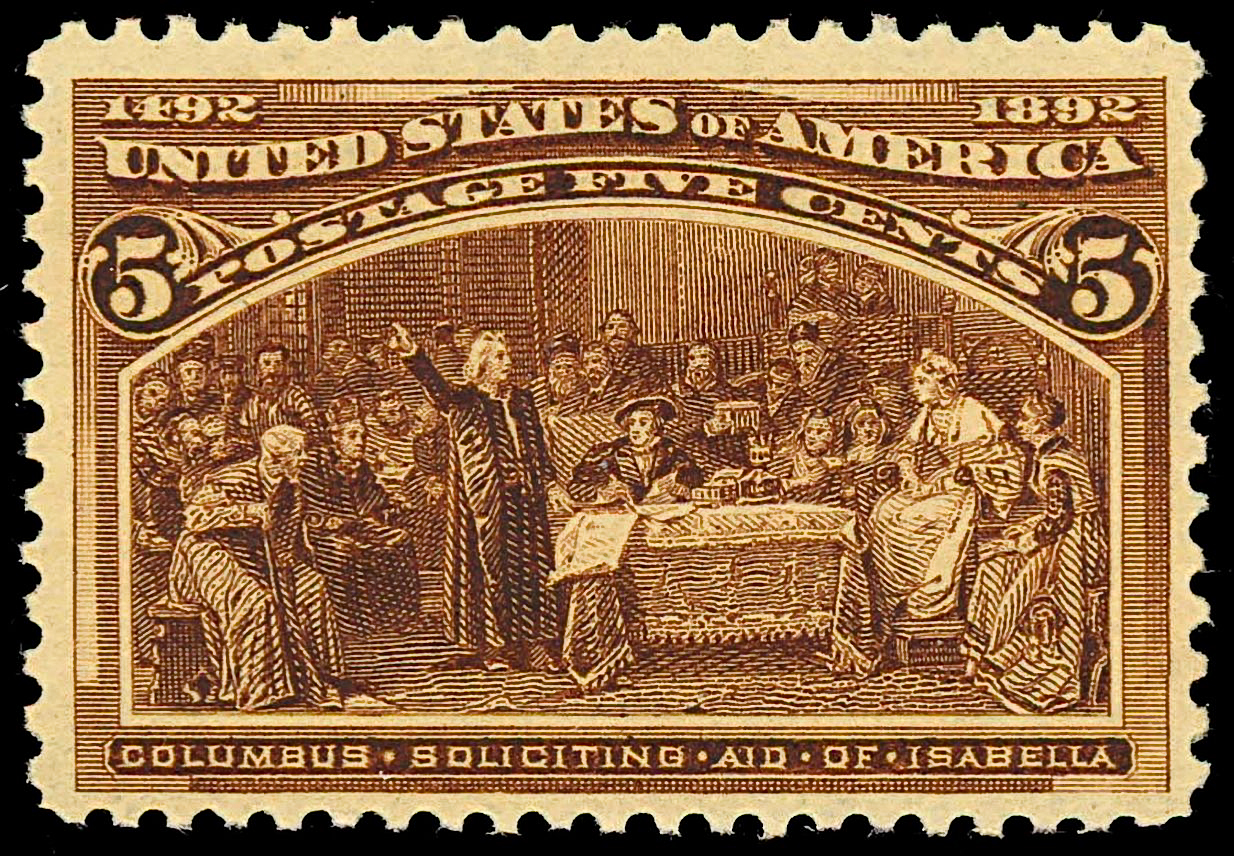
Columbus soliciting aid of Ferdinand's wife Isabella

The first years of Ferdinand and Isabella's joint rule saw the Spanish conquest of the Emirate of Granada, the last Islamic al-Andalus entity on the Iberian peninsula, completed in 1492.

The completion of the Reconquista was not the only significant act performed by Ferdinand and Isabella in that year. In March 1492, the monarchs issued the Edict of Expulsion of the Jews, also called the Alhambra Decree, a document which ordered all Jews either to be baptised and convert to Christianity or to leave the country. It allowed Mudéjar Moors (Islamic) and converso Marrano Jews to stay, while expelling all unconverted Jews from Castile and Aragon (most Jews either converted or moved to the Ottoman Empire). 1492 was also the year in which the monarchs commissioned Christopher Columbus to find a westward maritime route for access to Asia, which resulted in the Spanish arrival in the Americas.

In 1494, the Treaty of Tordesillas divided the entire world beyond Europe between Portugal and Castile (Spain) for conquest and dominion purposes – by a north–south line drawn down the Atlantic Ocean.

== Forced conversions ==
Ferdinand abrogated a section of the 1491 Treaty of Granada peace treaty in 1502 by dismissing the clearly guaranteed religious freedom for Mudéjar Muslims. Ferdinand forced all Muslims in Castile and Aragon to convert, converso Moriscos, to Catholicism, or else be expelled. Some of the Muslims who remained were mudéjar artisans, who could design and build in the Moorish style.

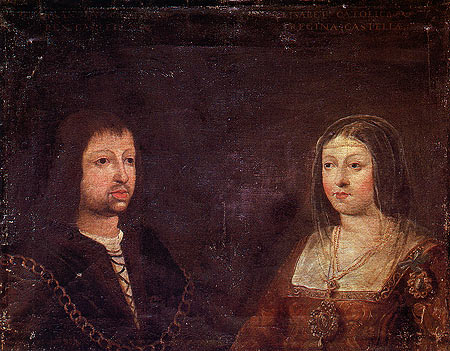
Wedding portrait of Ferdinand and Isabella

The latter part of Ferdinand's life was largely taken up with disputes with successive kings of France over control of Italy, the Italian Wars. In 1494, Charles VIII of France invaded Italy and expelled Alfonso II, who was Ferdinand's first cousin once removed and step nephew, from the throne of Naples. Ferdinand allied with various Italian princes and with Emperor Maximilian I to expel the French by 1496 and install Alfonso's son, Ferdinand II, on the Neapolitan throne. In 1500, following Ferdinand II's death and accession of his uncle Frederick, Ferdinand signed an agreement with Charles VIII's successor, Louis XII, who had just successfully asserted his claims to the Duchy of Milan, to partition Naples between them, with Campania and the Abruzzi, including Naples itself, going to the French and Ferdinand taking Apulia and Calabria. The agreement soon fell apart and, over the next several years, Ferdinand's great general Gonzalo Fernández de Córdoba fought to take Naples from the French, finally succeeding by 1504.

The King of France complains that I have twice deceived him. He lies, the fool; I have deceived him ten times and more.

— Ferdinand the Catholic

Some time before 1502, Andreas Palaiologos, the last exiled claimant to the Byzantine throne of his house, sold his titles and royal and imperial rights to Ferdinand. Those, however, had never been made use of, due to the doubtful nature of the deal.

== After Isabella ==
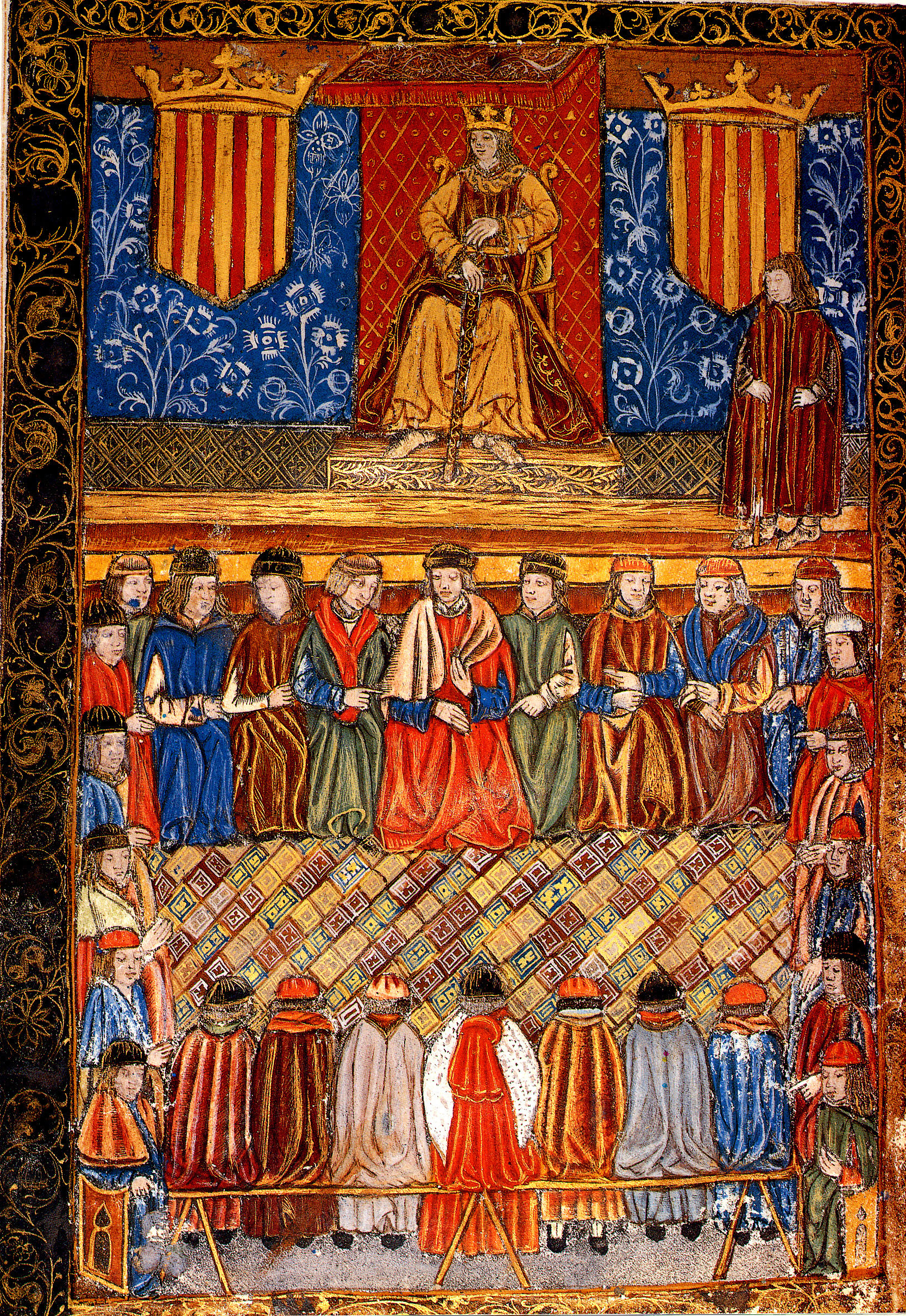
Ferdinand on his throne presiding over the General Court of Catalonia, flanked by two shields with the emblem of the royal arms. Frontispiece of a 1495 edition of Catalan constitutions.

Isabella made her will on 12 October 1504 in advance of her death on 26 November 1504. In it, she spelled out the succession to the Crown of Castile, leaving it to Joanna and then to Joanna's son Charles. Isabella was dubious of Joanna's ability to rule and was not confident of Joanna's husband Archduke Philip. Ferdinand moved quickly after his wife's death to continue his role in Castile. On the day of his wife's death, he formally renounced his title as King of Castile and instead became governor (gobernador) of the kingdom as a way to become regent. Philip deemed his wife sane and fit to rule. A compromise was forged between Philip and Ferdinand, which gave Ferdinand a continued role in Castile. Ferdinand had served as Joanna's regent during her absence in the Netherlands, ruled by her husband Archduke Philip. Ferdinand attempted to retain the regency permanently, but was rebuffed by the Castilian nobility and replaced with Joanna's husband.

In the Treaty of Villafáfila of 1506, Ferdinand renounced not only the government of Castile in favor of Philip but also the lordship of the Indies, withholding half of the income of the "kingdoms of the Indies". Joanna and Philip immediately added to their titles the kingdoms of Indies, Islands and Mainland of the Ocean Sea. But the Treaty of Villafáfila did not hold for long because of the death of Philip; Ferdinand returned as regent of Castile and as "lord of the Indies".

The widowed Ferdinand made an alliance with France in July 1506 and married Germaine of Foix, cementing the alliance with France. She was the granddaughter of his half-sister Queen Eleanor of Navarre and niece of Louis XII of France. Had Ferdinand's son with Germaine, John, Prince of Girona, born on 3 May 1509, survived, "the crown of Aragon would inevitably been separated from Castile" and denied his grandson Charles the crown of Aragon. But the infant Prince John died within hours and was buried in the convent of Saint Paul in Valladolid, Kingdom of Castile and Leon. He was later transferred to Poblet Monastery, Vimbodí i Poblet, Principality of Catalonia (Crown of Aragon), traditional burial site of the kings of Aragon.

Ferdinand had no legal position in Castile, with the cortes of Toro recognizing Joanna and her children as heirs, and Ferdinand left Castile in July 1506. After his son-in-law Philip's untimely death in September 1506, Castile was in crisis. Joanna was allegedly mentally unstable, and Joanna's and Philip's son, Charles, the future Emperor Charles V, was only six years old. Cardinal Francisco Jiménez de Cisneros, the Chancellor of the Kingdom, was made regent, but the upper nobility reasserted itself. Ferdinand led an army against Pedro Fernández de Córdoba y Pacheco, the marquis of Priego of Córdoba, who had seized control there by force.

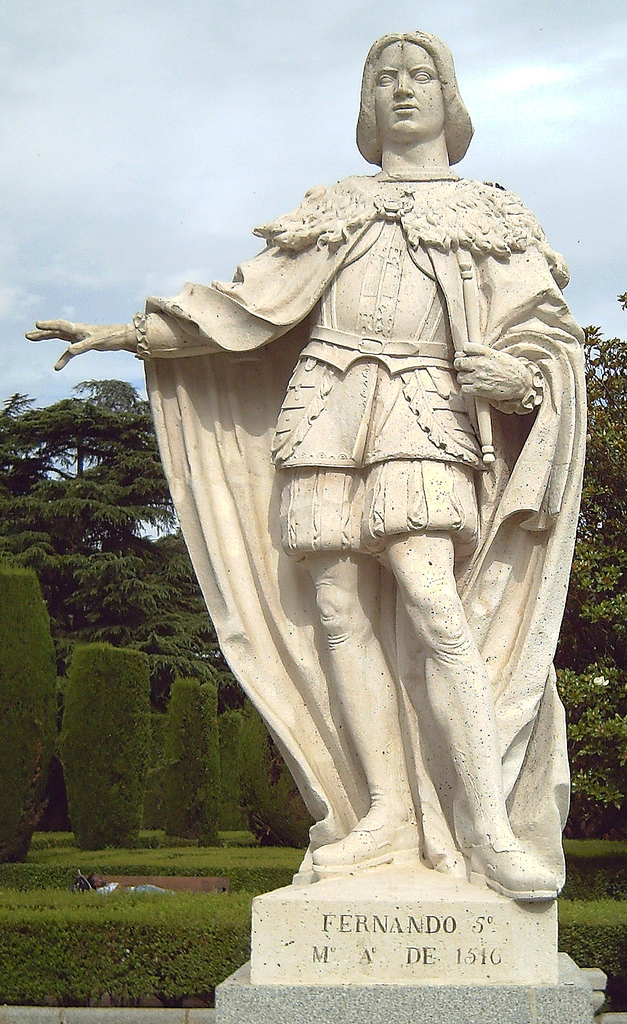
Statue of Ferdinand in the Sabatini Gardens in Madrid

By 1508, Ferdinand had triumphed and war resumed in Italy, this time against the Republic of Venice, in which all the other powers with interests on the Italian peninsula, including Louis XII, Ferdinand II, Maximilian, and Pope Julius II joined together in the League of Cambrai. Although the French were victorious against Venice at the Battle of Agnadello, the League of Cambrai soon fell apart, as both the Pope and Ferdinand II became suspicious of French intentions. Instead, the 'Holy League' was formed, in which now all the powers joined together against Louis XII and France.

In November 1511, Ferdinand and his son-in-law King Henry VIII of England signed the Treaty of Westminster, pledging mutual aid between the two against Navarre and France ahead of the Spanish invasion of Navarre as of July 1512. After the fall of Granada in 1492, he had manoeuvred for years to take over the throne of the Basque kingdom, ruled by Queen Catherine of Navarre and King John III of Navarre, also lords of Béarn and other sizeable territories north of the Pyrenees and in Gascony. Ferdinand annexed Navarre first to the Crown of Aragon, but later, under the pressure of Castilian noblemen, to the Crown of Castile. The Holy League was generally successful in Italy as well, driving the French from Milan, which was restored to its Sforza dukes by the peace treaty in 1513. The French were successful in reconquering Milan two years later, however.

Ferdinand II died on 23 January 1516, in Madrigalejo, Extremadura, Kingdom of Castile and Leon. He is entombed at Capilla Real, Granada. His wife Isabella, daughter Joanna, and son-in-law Philip rest beside him there.

== Legacy and succession ==
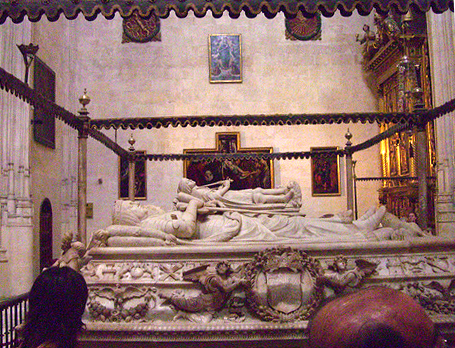

Ferdinand and Isabella established a highly effective sovereignty under equal terms, laid down in a prenuptial agreement. During their reign, they supported each other effectively in accordance to their joint motto of equality: "Tanto monta [or monta tanto], Isabel como Fernando" ("They amount to the same, Isabel and Ferdinand"). Isabella and Ferdinand's achievements were remarkable: Spain was united, or at least more united than it ever had been; the crown power was centralised, at least in name; the reconquista was successfully concluded; the groundwork for the most dominant military machine of the next century and a half was laid; a legal framework was created; the church was reformed. Even without the benefit of the American expansion, Spain would have been a major European power. The discoveries of Columbus set Spain on course to become the first modern world power.

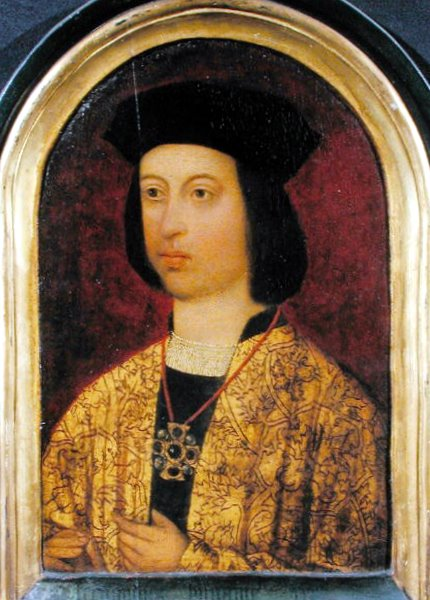
Ferdinand by an unknown painter, c. 1520s

During the reign of Ferdinand and Isabella, Spain pursued alliances through marriage with Portugal and the Habsburg rulers of Austria, and Burgundy.

=== Succession in Castile ===
Their first-born daughter Isabella was married to Manuel I of Portugal, their first-born son John to Margaret of Austria, and their younger daughter Joanna to Philip of Habsburg, ruler of Burgundy (now the Netherlands and Belgium). However, the deaths of the older children without heirs altered the succession. When Isabella died in 1504, Joanna succeeded her, with Philip as king jure uxoris. But as they were then in Burgundy, Ferdinand continued to rule, claiming that Joanna was insane. Philip came to Castile with Joanna, and Ferdinand had to yield the government of Castile to Philip in 1506. Then Philip died less than three months later, leaving Joanna to rule. In 1507, Ferdinand had Joanna, who was distraught with grief, placed in confinement, and ruled Castile in her name until his own death in 1516. In his will he named Cardinal Cisneros as regent for Castile.

=== Succession in Aragon ===
In 1502, the Cortes of Aragon gathered in Zaragoza, and the parliaments of the Kingdom of Valencia and of the Principality of Catalonia in Barcelona. As members of the Crown of Aragon, they swore oaths of loyalty to Joanna as heiress. Alonso de Aragón, Archbishop of Zaragoza, stated firmly that these oaths were invalid and did not change the law of succession; that could only be done by formal legislation by the Cortes and the King. Nonetheless, when Ferdinand died in 1516, Joanna inherited the Crown of Aragon.

=== Successions of Charles ===
Joanna was still in confinement, and was not informed of Ferdinand's death. Her own heir was her 17-year-old son Charles, then in Burgundy. His Burgundian counselors wanted him to assume the royal titles, and so did his grandfather Emperor Maximilian I and Pope Leo X. Charles arrived in 1517 and induced Joanna to accept him as co-ruler. Charles was then proclaimed King of Castile and of Aragon jointly with his mother. Cardinal Cisneros accepted the fait accompli, and the Castilian Cortes and Aragonese Cortes paid homage to him as King.

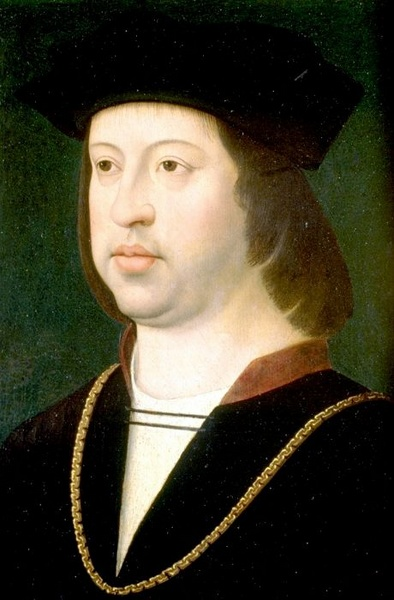
Ferdinand the Catholic, by the Master of the Legend of the Magdalen

Thus Ferdinand's grandson and successor Charles inherited the Spanish and Italian lands of his maternal grandparents, as well as the Austrian and Burgundian]] lands of his paternal family. His heirs were the most powerful rulers on the continent, and with the discoveries and conquests in the Americas and elsewhere, ruled the first truly global empire.

== Children ==
With his wife Isabella I the Catholic (whom he married 19 October 1469), King Ferdinand had seven children:

1. Isabella (1470–1498), Princess of Asturias (1497–1498). She married first Afonso, Prince of Portugal, then after his death married his uncle Prince Manuel, the future King Manuel I of Portugal. She died in childbirth delivering her son Miguel da Paz, Crown Prince of both Portugal and Spain who, in turn, died in infancy.
2. A son miscarried on 31 May 1475 in Cebreros
3. John (1478–1497), Prince of Asturias (1478–1497). He married Margaret of Austria (daughter of Emperor Maximilian I). He died of tuberculosis and his posthumous child with Margaret was stillborn.
4. Joanna I (1479–1555), Princess of Asturias (1500–1504), Queen of Castile (1504–1555), Queen of Aragon (1516–1555). She married Philip I (Philip the handsome) (son of Emperor Maximilian I); and was the mother of King Charles I of Spain (also known as Charles V as Holy Roman Emperor). Ferdinand made her out to be mentally unstable and she was incarcerated by him, and then by her son, in Tordesillas for over 50 years. Her grandson, Philip II of Spain, was crowned in 1556.
5. Maria (1482–1517). She married King Manuel I of Portugal, the widower of her elder sister Isabella, and was the mother of King John III of Portugal and of the Cardinal-King, Henry I of Portugal.
6. A stillborn child, twin of Maria. Born 1 July 1482 at dawn. Sources differ on gender.
7. Catherine of Aragon (1485–1536). She married first Arthur, Prince of Wales, son of and heir to King Henry VII of England and, after Prince Arthur's death, she married his brother Henry, Duke of York, who also became Prince of Wales and then King Henry VIII. She thus became Queen of England and was the mother of Queen Mary I.

With his second wife, Germaine of Foix (whom he married on 19 October 1506 in Blois, Kingdom of France), King Ferdinand had one son:

- John, Prince of Girona, who died hours after being born on 3 May 1509.

He also left several illegitimate children. Two of them were born before his marriage to Isabella.

With Aldonça Ruiz d'Ivorra i Alemany, a Catalan noblewoman of Cervera, he had:

- Alonso de Aragón (1469–1520). Archbishop of Zaragoza and Viceroy of Aragon.

With Juana Nicolaua:

- Juana de Aragón (1469–1510). She married Bernardino Fernández de Velasco, 1st Duke of Frías.

With Toda de Larrea:

- María Esperanza de Aragón (? – 1543). Abbess of Santa María la Real de Las Huelgas.

With Juana Pereira:

- María Blanca (1483–1550). Abbess of Santa María la Real de Las Huelgas, where her sister María was previously abbess.

With María Luisa Duque de Estrada y López de Ayala:

- Alonso de Estrada (c. 1470– 1530), Governor and Captain General of New Spain, General Treasurer of the Royal Treasury of New Spain, Corregidor of Cáceres, Admiral of the Fleet of Málaga. Considered by some historians as a possible illegitimate son of Ferdinand II.

== Heraldry ==
Heraldry of Ferdinand of Aragon

Monarch of the Crown of Castille (with Isabella I)

1474–1492.

After the conquest of Granada.
With the arms of Granada.
1492–1504

=== Description ===
The Arms quarter the arms of Castile and León with the arms of Aragon and Aragonese Sicily, the last combining the arms of Aragon with the black eagle of the Hohenstaufen of Sicily.

=== Sovereign of Aragon ===
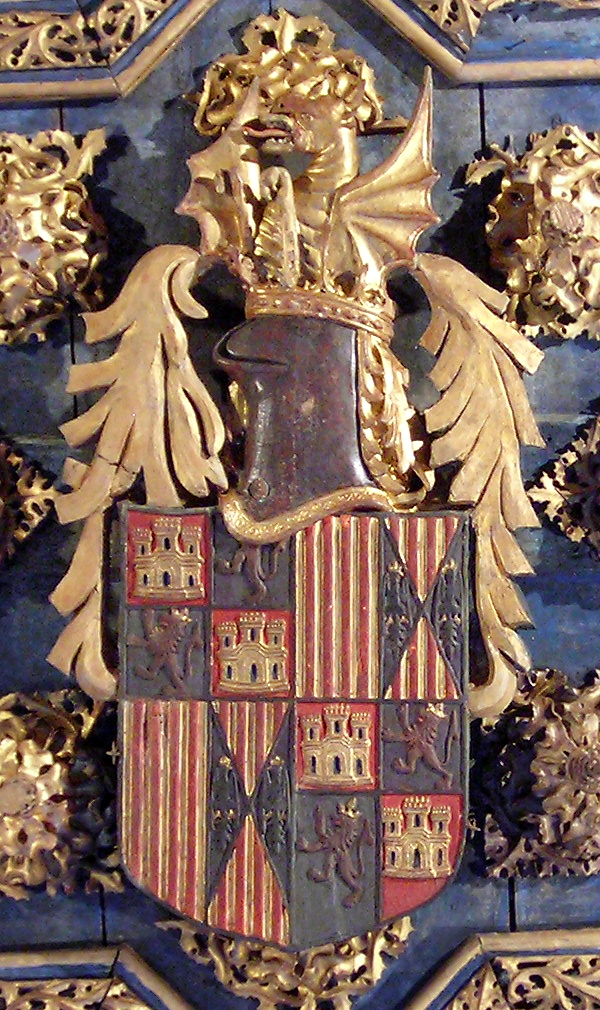
Coat of arms of Ferdinand II, in La Aljafería in Zaragoza.

Common design
1479–1492

Version with supporters
1513–1516
1474–1492

1492–1504

1504–1513

1513–1516

== Depiction in film and television ==
=== Films ===
Year	Film	Director(s)	Actor
1951	Hare We Go	Robert McKimson	Mel Blanc
1976	La espada negra	Francisco Rovira Beleta	Juan Ribó
1985	Christopher Columbus	Alberto Lattuada	Nicol Williamson
1992	Christopher Columbus: The Discovery	John Glen	Tom Selleck
1992	1492: Conquest of Paradise	Ridley Scott	Fernando García Rimada
1992	Carry On Columbus	Gerald Thomas	Leslie Phillips
2001	Juana la Loca	Vicente Aranda	Héctor Colomé
2016	Assassin's Creed	Justin Kurzel	Thomas Camilleri

=== TV series ===
Year	Series	Channel
1980	Shaheen(Based on Naseem Hijazi Novel)	PTV
1991	Réquiem por Granada	TVE
2004	Memoria de España	TVE
2011	Muhteşem Yüzyıl	Show TV
2012	Isabel	TVE
2014	Borgia (TV series)	Canal+
2020	The Spanish Princess	Starz

== See also ==
- Catholic Monarchs
- Spanish Empire
- List of Spanish monarchs

== Explanatory notes ==
Ferdinand the Catholic House of Trastámara Born: 10 March 1452 Died: 23 January 1516
Regnal titles
Preceded by John the Great	King of Sicily; 1468–1516	Succeeded by Joanna I
Preceded by John the Great	King of Aragon, Valencia, Sardinia and Majorca, Count of Barcelona; 1479–1516	Succeeded by Joanna I
Preceded by Isabella I as sole monarch	King of Castile, León, Toledo, Galicia, Seville, Córdoba, Murcia, Jaén, Algeciras and Gibraltar; 1475–1504 with Isabella I	Succeeded by Joanna I
Preceded by Charles the Affable	Count of Roussillon and Cerdagne; 1493–1516	Succeeded by Joanna I
Preceded by Louis III	King of Naples; 1504–1516	Succeeded by Joanna I
Preceded by Catherine and John III	King of Navarre; 1512–1516	Succeeded by Joanna I
Preceded by Muhammad XI as Sultan	King of Granada; 1492–1504 with Isabella I	Succeeded by Joanna I
Titles of nobility
Preceded by Charles of Viana	Prince of Girona; 1461–1479	Succeeded by John of Asturias
Preceded by John the Great	Lord of Balaguer; 1458–1479	Succeeded by John of Asturias
Preceded by John the Great	Duke of Gandía; 1461–1479	Merged with the Crown
Preceded by Juana Enríquez	Lord of Casarrubios del Monte; 1468–1479	Merged with the Crown
Titles in pretence
Preceded by Isabella I as sole monarch	— TITULAR — King of the Algarve; 1475–1504	Succeeded by Joanna I
