= Twelfth siege of Gibraltar =

Siege of War of the Spanish Succession

- Part of War of the Spanish Succession
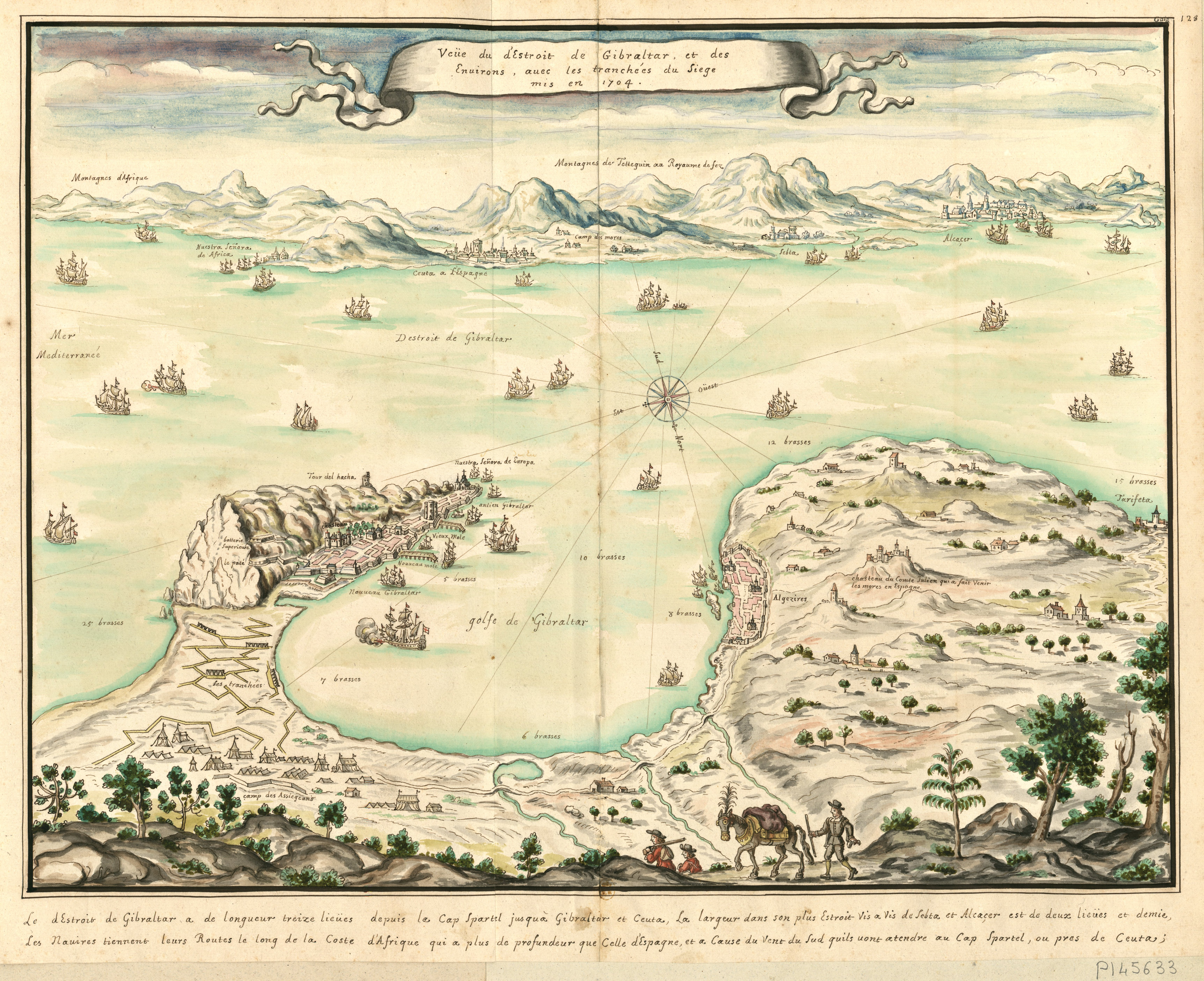
- Veüe du d'Estroit de Gibraltar et des Environs, avec les tranchées du Siège mis en 1704, Louis Boudan
| Date | September 1704 – May 1705 |
| Location | Gibraltar 36.155341°N 5.345964°W |
| Result | Grand Alliance victory |

Belligerents
| England; Dutch Republic; Austria; Pro-Habsburg Spain; Kingdom of Portugal | Pro-Bourbon Spain; France |

Commanders and leaders
| George of Hesse; John Leake | Francisco Fajardo; René de Froulay |

Strength
| 2,000 (start of the siege) | 8,000 (start of the siege) |

Casualties and losses
| 400 killed, missing, captured or died of disease | 10,000 killed, missing, captured or died of disease |
- Location within Spain

The twelfth siege of Gibraltar was fought between September 1704 and May 1705 during the War of the Spanish Succession. It followed the capture in August 1704 of the fortified town of Gibraltar, at the southern tip of Spain, by an Anglo–Dutch naval force led by Sir George Rooke and Prince George of Hesse-Darmstadt. The members of the Grand Alliance, the Holy Roman Empire, England, the Netherlands, Pro-Habsburg Spain, Portugal and Savoy, had allied to prevent the unification of the French and Spanish thrones by supporting the claim of the Habsburg pretender Archduke Charles VI of Austria as Charles III of Spain. They were opposed by the rival claimant, the Bourbon Philip, Duke of Anjou, ruling as Philip V of Spain, and his patron and ally, Louis XIV of France. The war began in northern Europe and was largely contained there until 1703, when Portugal joined the confederate powers. From then, English naval attentions were focused on mounting a campaign in the Mediterranean to distract the French navy and disrupt French and Bourbon Spanish shipping or capture a port for use as a naval base. The capture of Gibraltar was the outcome of that initial stage of the Mediterranean campaign.

At the start of the siege, Gibraltar was garrisoned by around 2,000 Dutch, English, Austrian and pro-Habsburg Spanish troops facing a besieging force of up to 8,000 French, pro-Bourbon Spanish and Irish troops. The defenders were able to hold off the numerically superior besieging force through exploiting Gibraltar's geography and the small town's fortifications, though they were frequently short of manpower and ammunition. The besiegers were undermined by disputes between the French and Spanish officers and terrible conditions in their trenches and bastions, which led to outbreaks of epidemic disease and undermined morale. Sea power proved crucial, as the French navy sought unsuccessfully to prevent the Grand Alliance shipping in fresh troops, ammunition and food. Three naval battles were fought during the siege, two of which were clear defeats for the French and the last of which resulted in the siege being abandoned as hopeless after nine months of fruitless shelling. The outcome was disastrous for the French and Bourbon Spanish side, which was said to have lost 10,000 men against only 400 for the Grand Alliance.

== Background ==
The loss of Gibraltar in August 1704 posed a strategic threat to the rule of the Bourbon claimant to the Spanish throne, Philip V of Spain. It was not only, as a later Spanish writer put it, "the first town in Spain to be dismembered from the domination of King Philip and forced to recognise Charles," but it also potentially had great value as an entry point for the Grand Alliance armies. Its possibilities were recognised immediately by the Alliance forces' leader Prince George of Hesse-Darmstadt, who told Charles in a letter of September 1704, that Gibraltar was "a door through which to enter Spain". An army landed at Gibraltar could advance rapidly along the coast to Cádiz, supported by naval forces, and capture the major port. From there, it was a relatively short distance to Seville, where the Habsburg claimant Charles could be proclaimed king, following which the Alliance could march to Madrid and finish the war.

Gibraltar itself had been largely emptied of its population, most of whom left the town after its capture and had moved to temporary accommodation elsewhere in the Campo de Gibraltar. Only a few dozen Spaniards and a small community of neutral Genoese remained. The town was garrisoned by a motley assortment of Alliance forces, consisting of around 2,000 British and Dutch marines, 60 gunners and several hundred Spanish, mostly Catalans, followers of Charles of Austria. They were supported by Sir George Rooke's Anglo-Dutch fleet consisting of 51 ships of the line operating in the Strait of Gibraltar. The Alliance had two significant disadvantages – limited supplies and a pressing need for their ships, which had already been at sea for six months, to be repaired and reprovisioned.

As soon as Gibraltar was captured, the Alliance set about preparing for a Bourbon counter-attack. The Alliance fleet sailed a short distance across the strait to Tetuan in Morocco, where it took on fresh water. On 22 August, a French fleet was sighted in the strait but began to withdraw after being spotted. Rooke caught up with the French off Málaga on 24 August and attacked, in a bid to prevent the French from slipping past him and attacking Gibraltar. The two fleets were evenly matched but the French ships were faster and had more ammunition than the confederates. They did not manage to make this advantage count, however, and the Battle of Vélez-Málaga was effectively fought to a draw. No ships were sunk but both fleets took very heavy casualties with around 3,000 killed or wounded on each side, including the French commander. The Anglo-Dutch fleet was hampered by a shortage of shot and gunpowder, much of which had already been used in bombarding Gibraltar during the operation to capture it, and Sir George Byng's squadron was forced to pull back when it ran out of ammunition. The rest of the fleet was dangerously low on ammunition but fortunately for the confederates, the French withdrew the following day, leaving the Anglo-Dutch fleet to limp back to Gibraltar.

Having dealt with the French naval threat, Rooke left as many men, guns and supplies at Gibraltar as he could before sailing for home. He split off part of his fleet, leaving Admiral Sir John Leake with 18 ships to patrol the strait and the Portuguese coast. The Spanish had already mobilised their forces and at the start of September the Marquis of Villadarias, the captain-general of Andalusia, arrived in the vicinity of Gibraltar with an army of 4,000 men. Villadarias planned to increase his force to 12,000, consisting of 9,000 Spaniards and 3,000 Frenchmen. The Two Crowns force was also supplemented by many of the civilian refugees from Gibraltar.

== Siege ==
Hesse set about improving Gibraltar's defences to make it as difficult as possible for the enemy to mount a frontal attack. The town is set on the western side of a rocky peninsula connected to the Spanish mainland by a narrow sandy isthmus. The north side of the Rock of Gibraltar presents a vertical cliff; the only access to the town was via a narrow strip, only about 400 feet (120 m) wide, which was blocked by the heavily fortified curtain wall known as the Muralla de San Bernardo (later the Grand Battery). The prince sought to reduce this strip even further by flooding it, forcing any attackers to use a narrow path between the Rock and the inundated area or to advance along the narrow shoreline. He set up cannon in five batteries along the north side of Gibraltar: on the Old Mole, to provide flanking fire from the west; on the Baluarte de San Pablo (later North Bastion) and on the Landport curtain walls, to provide direct fire onto the isthmus; on the Baluarte de San Pedro (later Hesse's Demi Bastion), to provide flanking fire from the east; and in a Round Tower, on a clifftop spur overlooking the isthmus (later the site of Forbes' Batteries), from where fire could be directed onto enemy troops on the far side of the inundated area. A "bomb ship" was also installed off the Old Mole, carrying a heavy mortar to provide additional flanking fire from the west.

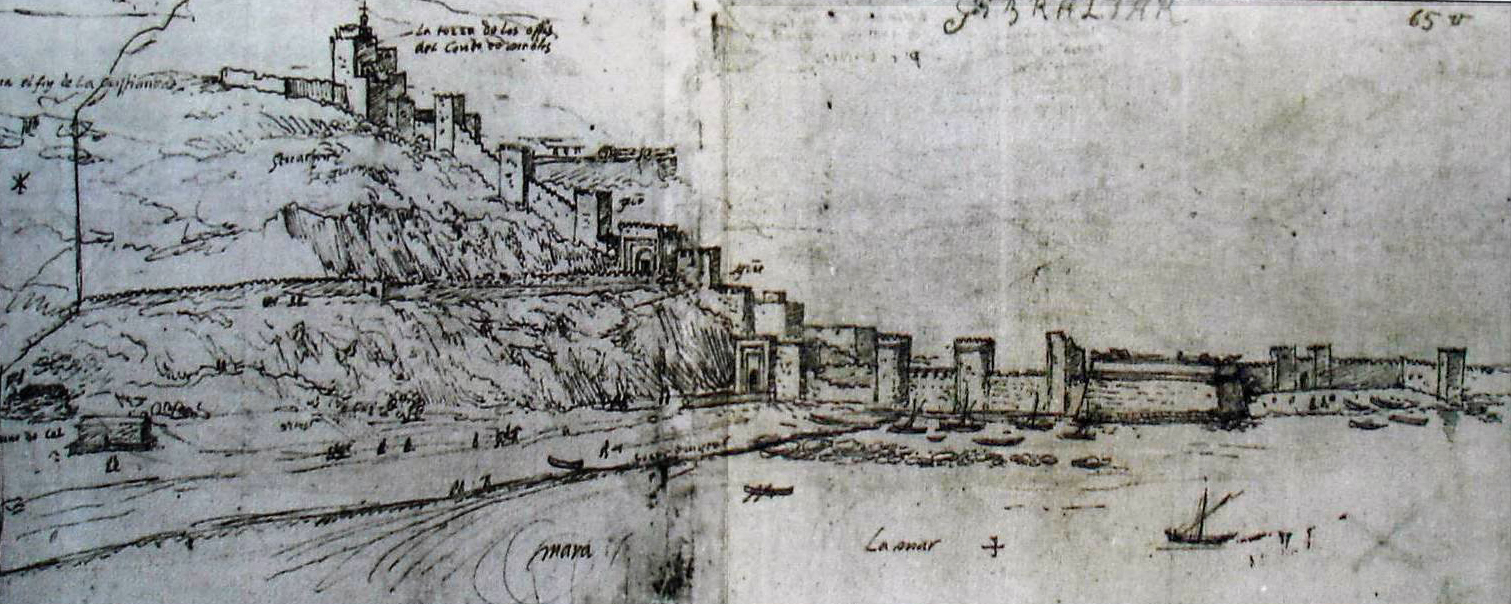
The northern approach to Gibraltar as seen in 1567; the view would have been substantially the same in 1704

Although Hesse was confident that he would be able to hold Gibraltar against the numerically superior Franco-Spanish force, he was undermined by political disputes between Habsburg and English commanders. There was widespread anger among the English marines in Gibraltar over the fact that they had been forbidden from returning home with Rooke's fleet. There was a particularly poisonous relationship between the English Colonel Edward Fox and Habsburg Colonel Henry Nugent, whom Hesse had appointed as governor of Gibraltar. The two men had fought on opposite sides during the Williamite War in Ireland; the Protestant Fox had gone on to serve Queen Anne, while the Catholic Nugent had joined the service of Charles of Austria. Hesse wrote that Fox was "furious at being under my orders and at not being allowed to leave for England. His respect for the Governor I have appointed is even less. There is confusion everywhere. Orders are not carried out, and the officers are the first to make trouble . . ."

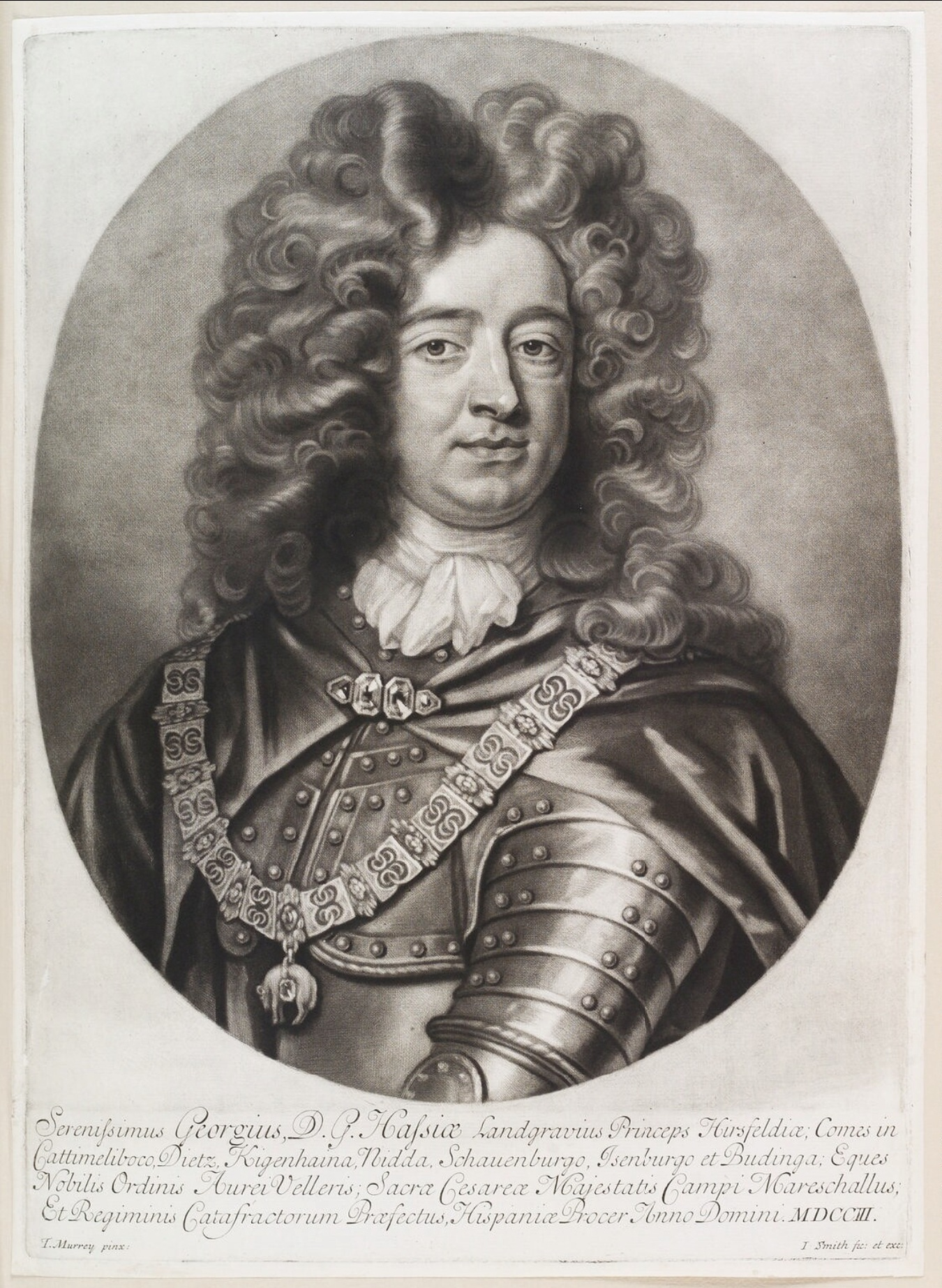
George of Hesse-Darmstadt, who commanded Gibraltar's garrison during the siege

The besieging French and Spanish forces were reinforced on 4 October when 19 French warships "great and small of the line of battle" escorted troop ships carrying 3,000 men with heavy guns and supplies of ammunition to a landing point near the ruined Roman town of Carteia at the head of the Bay of Gibraltar. This brought the number of soldiers under Villadarias's command to some 7,000, which Hesse estimated consisted of eight Spanish and six French battalions of foot plus nine cavalry squadrons. Most of the French ships left on 24 October, to the surprise of the defenders, though six remained behind to blockade Gibraltar.

After the reinforcements had settled in, the Spanish began digging siege lines and trenches towards the confederate positions. The first attack came on 26 October when Spanish guns opened fire on the confederate defences around the Round Tower, causing considerable damage. A French force carried out a simultaneous raid of Gibraltar's harbour, burning the bomb ship. Villadarias then carried out a heavy bombardment of the San Pablo bastion using 27 guns and 16 mortars, which managed to breach it. Among the casualties were the two feuding colonels, Fox and Nugent, who were killed on successive days. At the same time, an epidemic disease broke out among the Gibraltar garrison, reducing their effective numbers to about 1,300 men.

The position of the garrison looked increasingly precarious. Hesse sent a message to Admiral Leake at Lisbon requesting his urgent assistance after the appearance of French ships in the bay. After receiving the message on 21 October, Leake set sail at once, bringing more supplies for the defenders. In the meantime, Hesse had to deal with an internal threat – a plot by several Spanish officers, aided by a number of Catholic clergymen and English officers, to betray the garrison. He wrote to Charles in mid-October to inform the Archduke of what had happened:

I've discovered a tremendous plot . . . I've had a man hanged who communicated with the enemy. Clergymen persuaded him, though he had been convinced and had confessed under torture, to take everything back . . . assuring him I would not have him hanged. They went so far as to give the delinquent poison so that he would reveal nothing more . . . It's all very confused and difficult to sort out. [Colonels] Gonzalez and Husson and some clergymen are the principals . . . though against the two named I have taken no action . . . for lack of definite proof. Friar Santa Maria will give you personally a long account of the business . . . I will not confront Gonzalez and Husson unless it becomes a matter of absolute necessity . . .

Charles wrote back advising Hesse to carry out a court-martial with independent judges to avoid any suspicion of prejudice. As the accused were Habsburg subjects, a court-martial consisting of English and Dutch officers – who did not owe allegiance to Charles – was convened to adjudicate the case. The English officers who were implicated in the plot appear to have been sent back to England; their fate is not recorded. Gonzalez was convicted and on 23 February 1705, "being guilty of high treason [he] was shot in the face of the whole garrison."

=== Assault on the east side ===
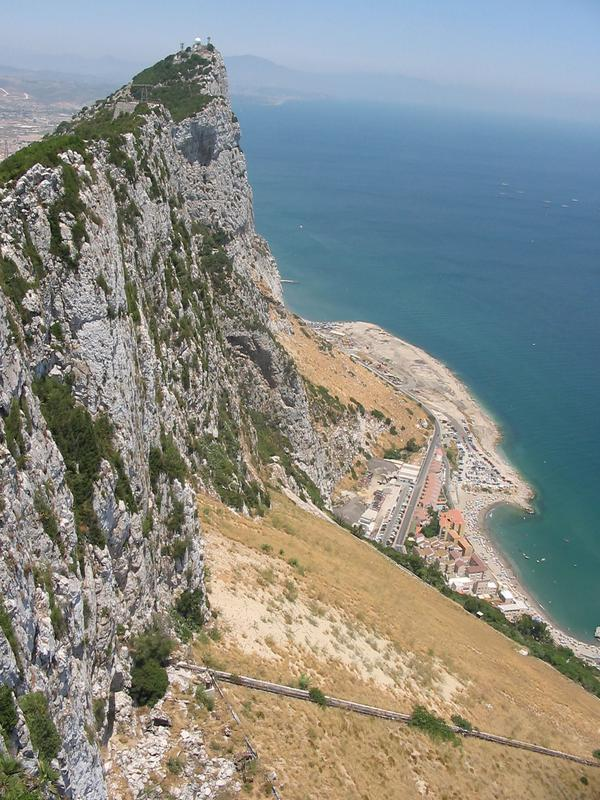
The sheer east side of the Rock of Gibraltar, which was scaled by a Bourbon Spanish force on 11 November 1704 to carry out an unsuccessful surprise attack

The pro-Bourbon Spaniards, meanwhile, were planning to carry out a surprise attack. Simón Susarte, a Spanish goatherd who had fled Gibraltar after its capture by Anglo-Dutch forces several few months earlier, told Villadarias that there was a secret route by which the east side of the Rock of Gibraltar could be scaled. It required a climb of around 400 metres (1,300 ft), of which the upper section was near-vertical, but was passable with the use of rope and ladders via the Great Gibraltar Sand Dune. As the east side was considered virtually impregnable, only the west side was fortified; if the Rock could be climbed from the east, an attacker could evade the fortifications and descend directly into the town. The route was reconnoitred and found to be passable by a lightly armed force.

Villadarias decided to send a force of 2,000 men – nearly a third of his entire army – divided into two groups: an initial force of 500 to seize the heights at night, followed by a further 1,500 the following daybreak. The initial force set off at dusk on 11 November, led by Colonel Figueroa and guided by Susarte. They made it to the top of the Rock, reaching its southernmost peak near where O'Hara's Battery stands today, and descended part-way down the west side where they sheltered overnight in St. Michael's Cave. At daybreak they climbed the Moorish Wall, which extends up the west side of the Rock, and killed the English sentries in the lookout point at Middle Hill. A drummer boy bringing food to the lookout point saw the attackers and raised the alarm.

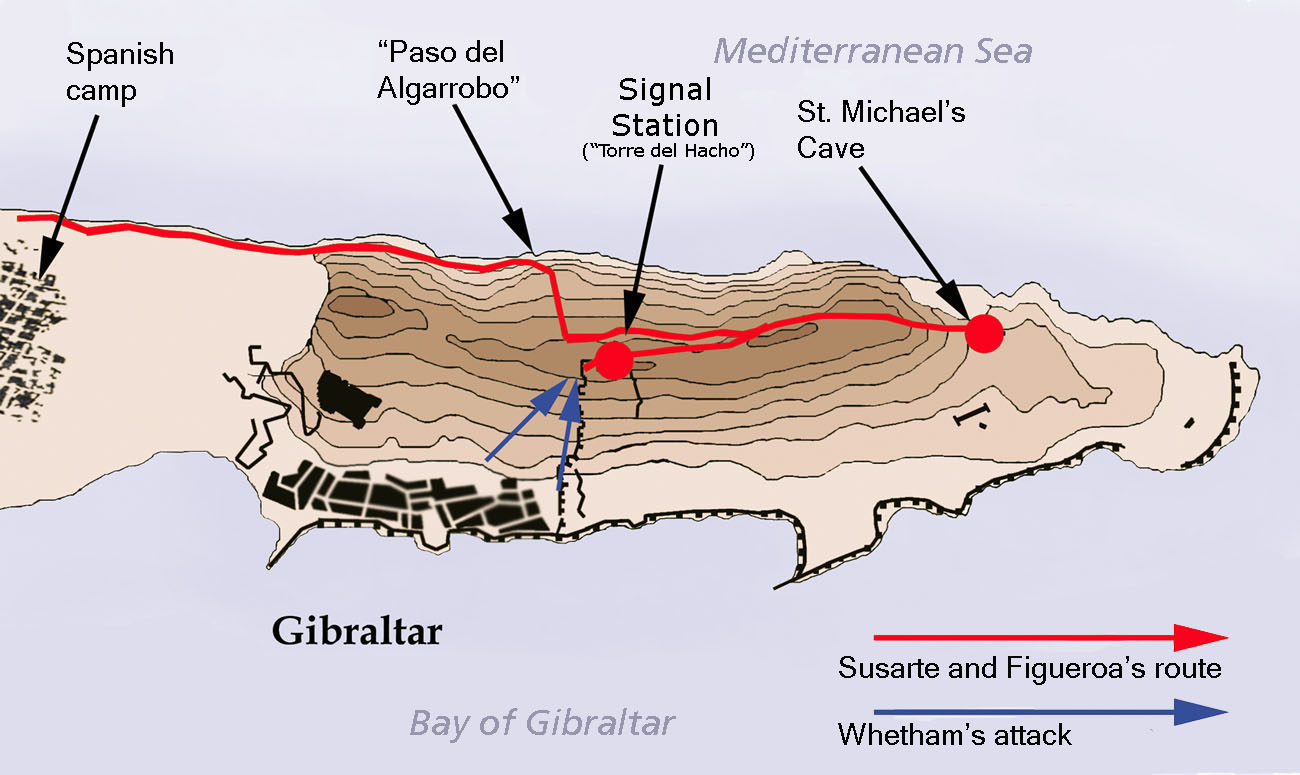
Route over the Rock of Gibraltar by the unsuccessful Bourbon surprise attack

Hesse had anticipated an attack from the rear and to guard against such a possibility kept in reserve a roughly 300-strong mobile force led by his brother Heinrich. The mobile force consisted of an English company and two pro-Habsburg Spanish companies; the first comprised regulars under Captain Francisco de Sandoval and the second consisted of Catalan miquelets under Jaume Burguy. Heinrich's force immediately responded to the incursion and engaged the attackers at Middle Hill. Although Villadarias' troops had the advantage of height, they were effectively trapped against the precipice of the Rock and only carried three rounds of ammunition each as a result of travelling light, being unprepared for a pitched battle.

Burguy, leading a detachment of miquelets and regulars, marched ahead of the rest of the mobile force and dislodged a group of attacking grenadiers at the top of the hill. At the same time, Sandoval led the remaining Spanish contingent of the mobile force in a charge against the bulk of the attacking force from one flank while Heinrich led the English company against Villadarias' men from the other flank. Hundreds of pro-Bourbon Spanish troops died, either from being killed in action or falling off the Rock while attempting to flee. The mobile force captured approximately 100 men, including a colonel. Only a few members of the initial force sent by Villadarias, including Susarte, made it back to the besiegers' lines. The English subsequently ensured that there would be no repeat of this episode by blasting away the path used by the attackers.

The other 1,500 members of the attacking force did not even set off to support the attack because, after the first 500 had left, Leake's squadron was sighted entering the bay with 20 ships. In the subsequent naval engagement, six French frigates were destroyed and a seventh ship was captured. Villadarias had apparently intended to carry out a multi-pronged attack but Leake's timely arrival meant that it fell apart. The French naval support for an assault on the moles evaporated, and a frontal assault via the isthmus – reinforced with the 1,500 men originally earmarked for the climb on the eastern side – failed entirely. Hesse's relief at Leake's timely arrival was evident in the letter that he sent the admiral after the battle, thanking him for turning up just as "the enemy were attacking us that very night of your entrance in many places at once with a great number of men."

Leake had not brought many supplies to Gibraltar but provided what he could, and loaned Hesse the fleet's skilled manpower, of which the confederate garrison was desperately short. A labour force of some 500 men was assembled from the ships' companies and was put to work repairing the fortifications, remounting guns dislodged by Spanish fire and hauling cannon up the Rock to increase the fire being directed onto the Spanish batteries. One of those involved, Captain Willis, played such a prominent role that the track he used was renamed (and is still known as) Willis' Road, and he also gave his name to Willis' Battery (now Princess Royal's Battery), Magazine and Guard.

The siege settled down into a routine of bombardment and counter-bombardment. This proved increasingly trying for the defenders, who were running short of manpower, ammunition and supplies. Captain Joseph Bennett, an engineer whom Leake had brought with him, helped to bolster the fortifications but earned the wrath of some in the garrison, who felt that Gibraltar should be abandoned. He wrote to a friend on 6 December to tell him that "many officers had a design to quit the place and blow up the works but I always opposed them, and mentioned the garrison could be kept with the number of 900 men we had, and no more, as I believe you will have an [account] of. Some was for cuting (sic) my Throat and others for cuting (sic) off my Ears &c."

Many members of the garrison tried to sneak aboard Leake's ships to escape the siege. The situation was precarious and was only worsened when a storm damaged many of Leake's ships on 4–5 December. By this time, the garrison was critically short of medicines and supplies. Many were sick or injured and too few remained to carry out repairs to the shell-damaged fortifications. Only 1,300 were healthy enough to man the defences. Their living conditions were increasingly grim; their shoes had worn out and many men wore makeshift sandals made from hay and straw.

=== Reinforcements ===
A few days later, Leake received the news that a convoy of 20 transport ships carrying supplies and reinforcements was on its way from Lisbon, escorted by four men-of-war. Adverse winds and currents meant that he was unable to sail to assist it against a French naval force that had left Cádiz, and he was forced to wait to see if the convoy would reach its destination. On 18 December, nine of the transports reached the bay, accompanied by two men-of-war, with another seven arriving on 20 December. Four were missing, having been intercepted by the French; three of them had been sunk or captured while the last one eventually made it to Gibraltar at the end of December. They brought with them 2,200 men from the Grenadier Guards, Donegal's Foot and Barrymore's Foot, plus some Dutch troops, guns and supplies of powder, tools and food. Further reinforcements arrived between 16–18 January. With Gibraltar safe for the moment, Leake left for Lisbon on 3 January with sick and wounded members of the garrison aboard his ships.

The Bourbon Spanish and French land force continued to bombard Gibraltar, inflicting further damage on the town's somewhat weak fortifications but were unable to make any progress against the reinforced garrison. They were being vigorously opposed with counter-bombardments, which killed many of their number, and by sallies, two of which were carried out successfully by the confederates on 23 and 31 December. Relations steadily worsened between the Spanish and French components of the besieging force, a trend that was exacerbated by the lack of progress they were making, the appalling conditions they were enduring in the open and the steady stream of casualties being caused by the counter-bombardment and outbreaks of epidemic disease. The weather, too, was terrible, with storms and heavy rain making life a misery. By the New Year of 1705, the besieging force was disintegrating and had dropped in numbers from around 7,000 men to only 4,000, the remainder having either become casualties or simply deserting.

The situation was sufficiently alarming that King Louis XIV of France despatched Marshal René de Froulay de Tessé along with 4,500 French and Irish reinforcements to recover the situation. Villadarias, however, was determined to make one more effort to take Gibraltar before Tessé arrived. On 7 February, he sent 1,500 French, Spanish, and Irish troops to seize the Round Tower, an outlying fortification on the cliff face above the present Laguna Estate. The attackers captured the tower but a confederate counter-attack drove them out, leaving 200 of them dead. The Spanish accused the French of fleeing the battlefield and leaving their flank unprotected.

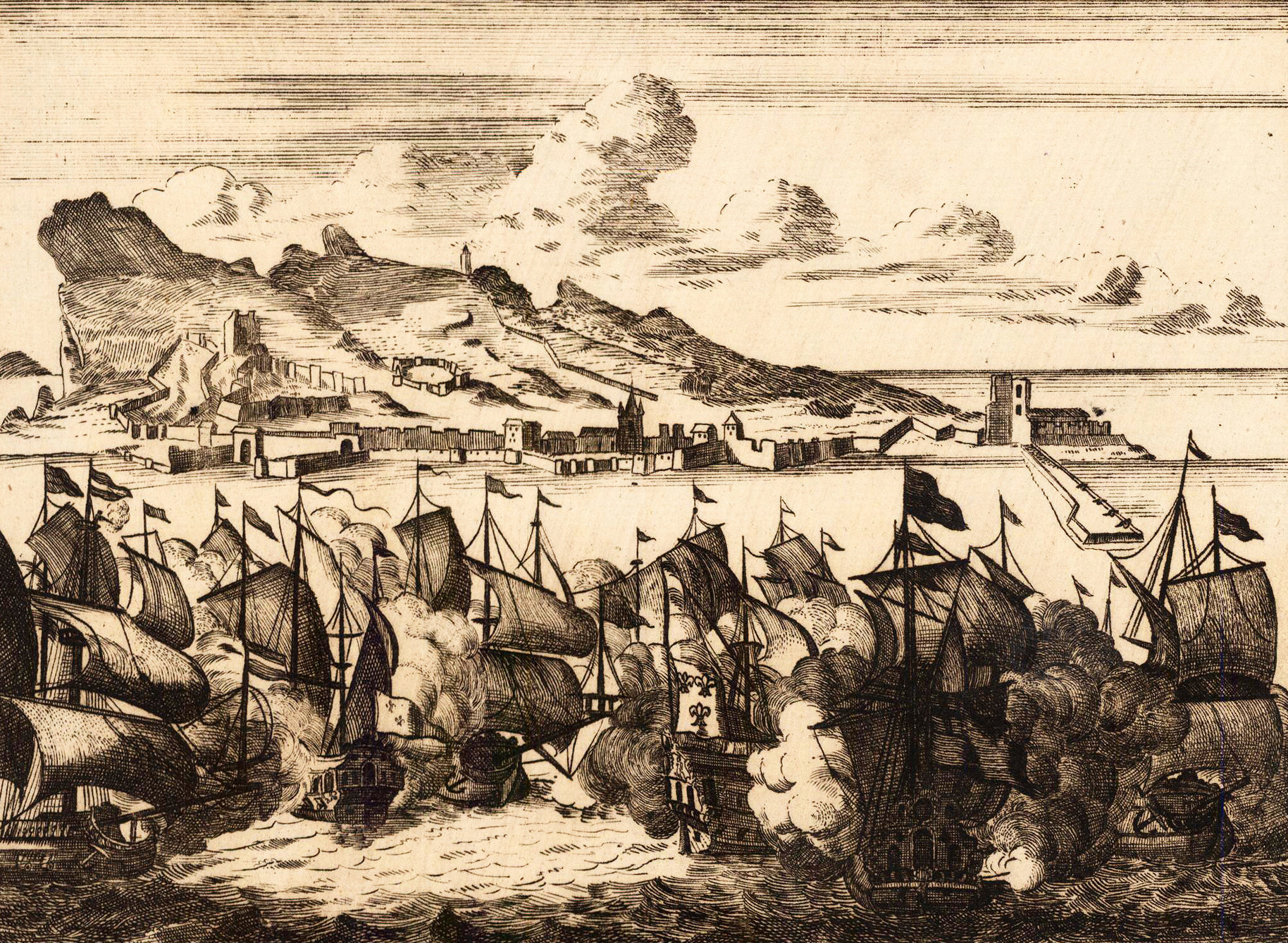
1715 lithograph of the Battle of Cabrita Point, which led to the siege's end

Tessé arrived in mid-February but was appalled to find how badly the siege was being run. His criticism of the Spanish officers led some to quit the siege in the face of what they saw as his insults. Their morale improved somewhat when Admiral Bernard Desjean, Baron de Pointis sailed into the bay on 26 February with a force of 18 men-of-war from Cádiz. Gibraltar's garrison immediately went on alert, expecting a landing at the south end of the peninsula, but this did not materialise. The reason soon became clear; Leake had returned with a combined English, Dutch and Portuguese force of 35 ships. In the subsequent Battle of Cabrita Point fought on 21 March, the French lost five ships of the line, including Pointis' flagship. Leake's fleet sailed into the bay on 31 March, bringing with it fresh troops from Mountjoy's Grenadiers and units of the Portuguese army. Hesse rejoiced at the admiral's arrival:

I expected with great impatience this good opportunity to express my hearty joy of your great and good success you had at your second appearing off this place; which I hope hath been the final stroke towards our relief; the enemy since five days have begun to withdraw their cannon . . . I in particular cannot enough express my hearty thanks and obligations I lie under.

Leake's arrival was "the final stroke", as the French abandoned the siege as hopeless following an order from Louis XIV on 12 April.

Tessé wrote bitterly to the king to blame the Spanish, telling him that "we have failed before Gibraltar for want of method and planning . . . the ill-fate of your vessels was due to lack of competence at Madrid . . ." With the French having gone home, Villadarias resumed command and began to convert the siege into a blockade by pulling back from the isthmus and removing his cannon. On 2 May, an Alliance scouting party found that the Spanish trenches had been abandoned. Later that day, Hesse accompanied a demolition party to destroy the Bourbon Spanish works, but some members of the party ventured out too far and were captured or killed by the Spanish cavalry. The following day, a larger party, protected by grenadiers, resumed the work of demolishing the Spanish batteries without further opposition, marking the end of the siege.

== Aftermath ==
During the rest of the War of Spanish Succession, Gibraltar would remain in Grand Alliance hands. After the siege George of Hesse left Gibraltar and took command of the conquest of Barcelona. He was later killed on 13 September, storming the citadel of Montjuich.

Following Hesse's departure Gibraltar was governed by British commandant Major General John Shrimpton as a possession of Duke Charles of Austria as Charles III of Spain on the advice of Queen Anne. The Queen subsequently declared Gibraltar a free port at the insistence of the Sultan of Morocco, though she had no formal authority to do so. Shrimpton was replaced in 1707 by Colonel Roger Elliott, who was replaced in turn by Brigadier Thomas Stanwix in 1711. This time the appointments were made directly by London with no claim of authority from Charles. Stanwix was ordered to expel all foreign troops from Gibraltar to secure its status as an exclusively British possession but failed to evict the Dutch, apparently not considering them "foreign".

The War of the Spanish Succession was finally settled in 1713 by a series of treaties and agreements. Under the Treaty of Utrecht, which was signed on 13 July 1713 and brought together a number of sub-treaties and agreements, Philip V was accepted by Britain and Austria as King of Spain in exchange for guarantees that the crowns of France and Spain would not be unified. Various territorial exchanges were agreed: although Philip V retained the Spanish overseas empire, he ceded the Southern Netherlands, Naples, Milan, and Sardinia to Austria; Sicily and some Milanese lands to Savoy; and Gibraltar and Menorca to Great Britain. In addition he granted the British the exclusive right to non-Spanish slave trading in Spanish America for thirty years, the so-called asiento. With regard to Gibraltar (Article X), the town, fortifications and port (but not the hinterland) were ceded to Britain "for ever, without any exception or impediment whatsoever." The treaty also stipulated that if Britain was ever to dispose of Gibraltar it would first have to offer the territory to Spain.

Gibraltar as a possession of Great Britain would endure two more sieges both of which ended in British victories. The first in 1727 which took place during the Anglo-Spanish war, and the second during the American Revolutionary War being the largest and longest from 1779-83.

== Bibliography ==
- Abulafia, David (2011). The Great Sea: A Human History of the Mediterranean. London: Allen Lane. ISBN 978-0-7139-9934-1.
- Alexander, Marc (2008). Gibraltar: Conquered by No Enemy. Stroud, Glos: The History Press. ISBN 978-0-7509-3331-5.
- Hills, George (1974). Rock of Contention: A history of Gibraltar. London: Robert Hale & Company. ISBN 0-7091-4352-4.
- Jackson, William G. F. (1986). The Rock of the Gibraltarians. Cranbury, NJ: Associated University Presses. ISBN 0-8386-3237-8.
- Kenyon, Edward Ranulph (1938). Gibraltar under Moor, Spaniard, and Briton. London: Methuen & Co. OCLC 5182061.
- Sayer, Frederick (1865). The History of Gibraltar and of Its Political Relation to Events in Europe. London: Chapman and Hall. OCLC 155313702.
