= Henry Nugent =

Henry Nugent, Count of Val de Soto
- Born: Ireland
- Died: November 1704; Gibraltar
- Military career
- Branch: Austrian Army
- Rank: Major General
- Commands: Governor of Gibraltar
- Conflicts: Williamite War in Ireland; Siege of Limerick

Henry Nugent, Count of Val de Soto (died November 1704) was an Irish military officer and nobleman who served as the governor of Gibraltar from 6 August to November 1704.

== Early life ==
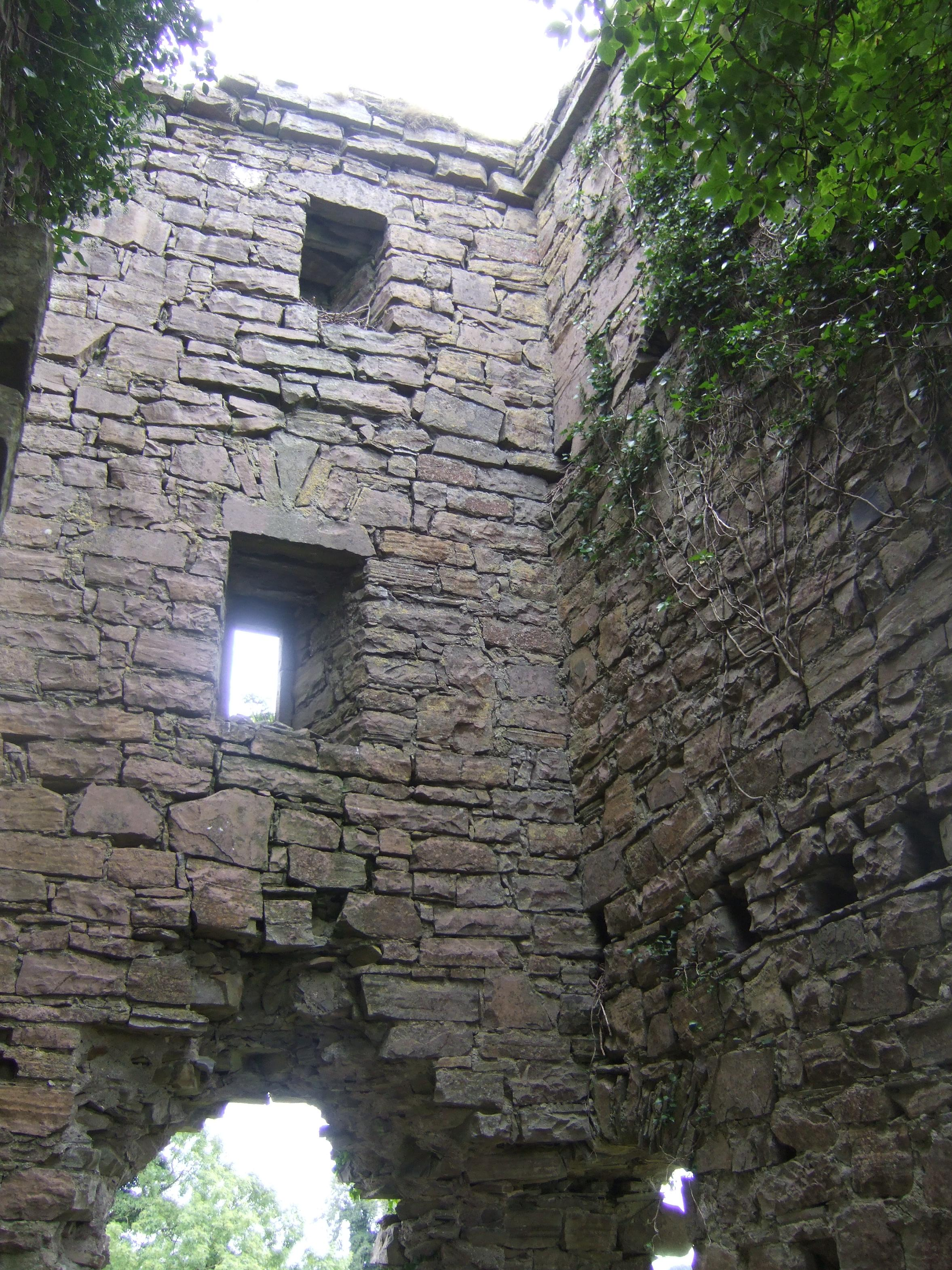
Coolamber Hall House

Nugent was born at Coolamber, County Longford. His father was Thomas Nugent, who descended from James Nugent, the younger brother of Richard Nugent, 13th Baron Delvin (died 1559). Henry's older brother was James Nugent of Coolamber.

== Career ==
In 1690–91, Nugent fought in the Irish campaign, in support of King James, during the Williamite War in Ireland. After the siege of Limerick in 1691, Nugent joined the Imperial regiment of Irish under Prince George of Hesse-Darmstadt in 1692, entering into service for the Habsburgs, as being a Roman Catholic, he was unable to be commissioned in the British Army.

In 1697, he distinguished himself while defending Barcelona against the French during the Siege of Barcelona at the orders of Prince George of Hesse-Darmstadt. Once the War of the Spanish Succession started, he was created Count of Val de Soto (Conde de Valdesoto) in Spain by Archduke Charles, pretender to the Spanish throne.

On 4 August 1704, Gibraltar was captured by an Anglo-Dutch force after a short siege which ended when Governor Diego de Salinas surrendered Gibraltar to Prince George, who took it in the name of the Archduke, as Charles III, king of Castile and Aragon. Two days later, on 6 August 1704, Nugent was appointed Governor of Gibraltar, with the rank of Major General. He was described as "an Irish Catholic, not well regarded by the English" (Spanish: un católico irlandes, mal visto por los ingleses). Brigadier Fox, commander of the English Marines, and junior to Nugent, demanded to go home. Hesse gave a refusal to Fox, prompting antagonism between Nugent and Fox.

During the Twelfth Siege of Gibraltar in November 1704, Nugent was mortally wounded on 9 November and died soon thereafter. His death was caused by wounds sustained at San Pablo Battery (North Bastion). He was succeeded as Governor by Brigadier John Shrimpton of the Royal Marines.

== Personal life ==
Nugent was survived by his wife and children.

- Daughter, Marcella, married Edward Nugent, grandson of Richard Nugent, 1st Earl of Westmeath.
- Son, Thomas, became 2nd Count of Valdesoto.

Thomas' son, Francis, became the 3rd Count of Valdesoto.

Government offices
Preceded by Prince George of Hesse-Darmstadt	Governor of Gibraltar; 6 August 1704 – November 1704	Succeeded by John Shrimpton
