= Francisco Antonio de Agurto, 1st Marquess of Gastañaga =

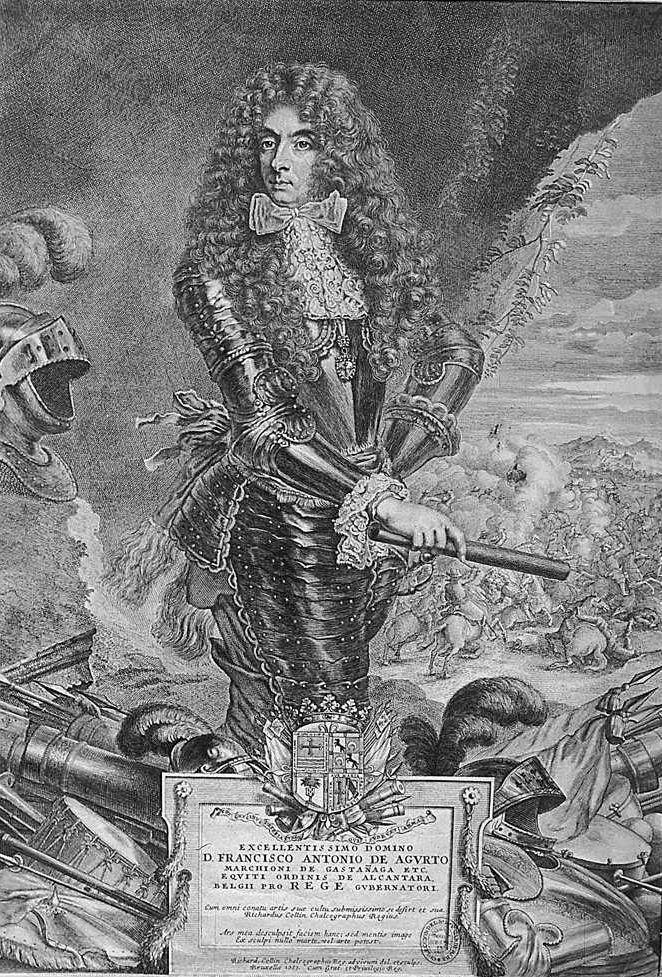
Portrait of Francisco Antonio de Agurto by the engraver Richard Collin.

Francisco Antonio de Agurto y Salcedo, 1st Marquess of Gastañaga (1640 – 2 November 1702) was a Spanish nobleman, viceroy and governor of Basque origin.

== Biography ==
He was born in Vitoria in a noble family of Basque origin. He became first Marquess de Gastañaga in 1676 and was Governor of the Habsburg Netherlands between 1685 and 1692. He led the Spanish troops in the Battle of Fleurus (1690) and unsuccessfully defended Mons against the French.
He had begun building a new royal chapel of Saint Joseph in Waterloo in 1687 as an attempt to curry favour with the court, but was recalled in December 1691 to Madrid for his failure to take the necessary defensive measures to hold Mons. He was replaced by Elector Maximilian Emmanuel, who would arrive in Brussels in March 1692.

In Madrid, a council absolved him of all responsibility regarding the Flanders question, and he became Viceroy of Catalonia between 1694 and 1696, where he was confronted with a French invasion during the War of the Grand Alliance. His position at the head of the allied army was disastrous, and he was replaced by George of Hesse-Darmstadt as commander of the army. Complaints from the Catalans regarding his command of the troops led in 1696 to his replacement as viceroy by Francisco de Velasco y Tovar, Conde de Melgar.

He never married, and died in Zaragoza. After his death, the title of Marquess of Gastañaga went to his brother, Iñigo Eugenio (1648–1715).

Government offices
Preceded by Otto Henry, Marquis of Caretto	Governor of the Spanish Netherlands; 1685–1692	Succeeded by Maximilian II Emanuel, Elector of Bavaria
Preceded by Juan Manuel María de la Aurora, 8th duke of Escalona	Viceroy of Catalonia; 1694–1696	Succeeded by Francisco de Velasco y Tovar, Conde de Melgar
Spanish nobility
Preceded by New Creation	Marquess of Gastañaga; 1676–1702	Succeeded by Iñigo Eugenio
