= Battle of Montjuïc =

Battle of Montuïc may refer to several historical battles including:

- Battle of Montjuïc (1641)
- Battle of Montjuïc (1705)
