= Cardinal Marquis of Almenara =

Spanish Roman Catholic cardinal

The Most Excellent The Most Eminent and Most Reverend Joaquín Fernández de Portocarrero y Mendoza 4th Marquis of Almenara
- Cardinal-Bishop of Sabina
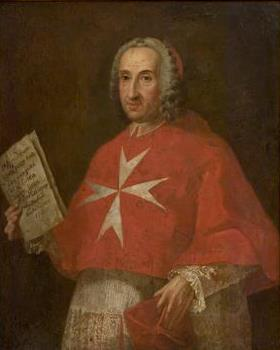
- Portrait by Antoine de Favray
- Church: Catholic Church
- See: Sabina
- In office: 20 September 1756 – 22 June 1760
- Predecessor: Silvio Valenti Gonzaga
- Successor: Giovanni Francesco Albani
- Other post: Cardinal-Priest of Santa Cecilia (1747-1760)
- Previous posts: Cardinal-Priest of Santa Maria in Trastevere (1753-1756); Cardinal-Priest of Santi Quattro Coronati (1743-1747); Titular Patriarch of Antioch (1735-1743)

Orders
- Ordination: 17 January 1730
- Consecration: 30 May 1735 by Álvaro Cienfuegos
- Created cardinal: 9 September 1743 by Pope Benedict XIV

Personal details
- Born: 27 March 1681 Madrid, Kingdom of Castile, Crown of Castille
- Died: 22 June 1760 (aged 79) Rome, Papal States

Joaquín Fernández de Portocarrero y Mendoza, 4th Marquis of Almenara, 9th Count of Palma del Río (27 March 1681 – 22 June 1760) was a Grandee of Spain who served Charles VI, Holy Roman Emperor as Viceroy of Sicily and interim Viceroy of Naples, before entering the priesthood in his late forties and rising to the rank of cardinal, ending his life as Cardinal-Bishop of Sabina.

== Career ==
He was born in Madrid, Spain as son of Luis Antonio Tomas de Portocarrero and Maria Leonor of Moscoso. In his twenties and thirties, he conducted military campaigns for King Philip V of Spain. He served Charles VI, Holy Roman Emperor as Viceroy of Sicily from 1722 to 1728 and interim Viceroy of Naples from July–December 1728. He was Spanish Ambassador in Rome from 1746 to 1760, on behalf of King Ferdinand VI of Spain.

== Ecclesiastical career ==
He was ordained into the priesthood on 17 January 1730. On 25 May 1735 he was appointed the Latin Patriarch of Antioch, and on 30 May he was ordained a bishop. On 9 September 1743, he was elevated to cardinal, and appointed Cardinal-Priest of Santi Quattro Coronati. He was subsequently appointed Cardinal-Priest of Santa Cecilia in Trastevere on 10 April 1747, and then Cardinal-Priest of Santa Maria in Trastevere on 9 April 1753.

On 20 September 1756, he was appointed Cardinal-Bishop of Sabina. In 1758, he participated in the papal conclave that elected Pope Clement XIII.

== Death ==
He died in Rome in 1760. No issue, titles passed to Aragonese family connected Pedro "Fernandez de Hijar" y "Abarca de Bolea" (1741–1808), Grandee of Spain, 9th Duke of Hijar, 9th Duke of Lecera, 5th Duke of Bournonville and many other lesser titles.
