= Diego de Salinas =

Spanish governor

Don Diego de Salinas
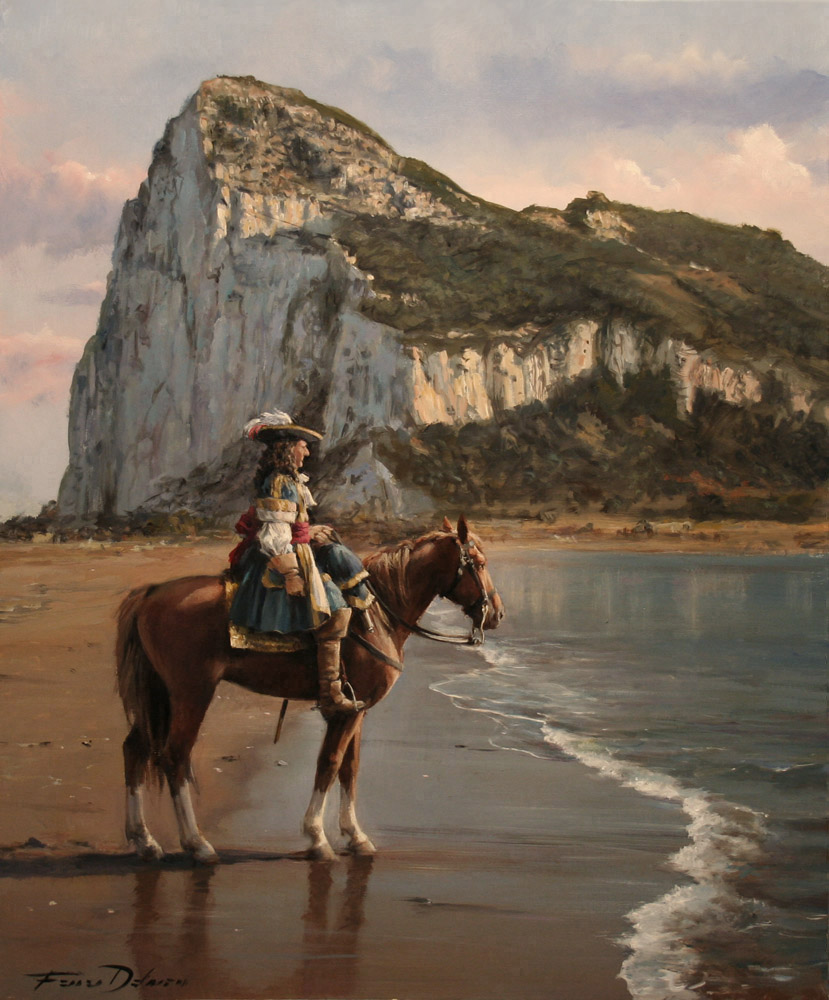
- The Last of Gibraltar, by Augusto Ferrer-Dalmau. It depicts Diego de Salinas in 1704, with the Rock of Gibraltar in the background.
- Born: Diego Esteban Gómez de Salinas y Rodríguez de Villarroel; 3 August 1649; Madrid, Spain
- Died: 27 November 1720 (aged 71); Madrid, Spain
- Military career
- Allegiance: Spain
- Commands: Last Spanish Governor of Gibraltar
- Conflicts: Capture of Gibraltar

Don Diego Esteban Gómez de Salinas y Rodríguez de Villarroel (3 August 1649 – 27 November 1720) was the last Spanish Governor of Gibraltar. He held the post when the Rock was captured by an Anglo-Dutch fleet in August 1704.

== Biography ==
Salinas y Rodríguez was born in Madrid. He was the son of Pedro Gómez Salinas and Agustina Rodríguez de Villarroel, aristocrats of the small nobility (from Burgos, by his father's side and Valladolid, by his mother's side). He began in the army as a page of the Constable of Castile, Iñigo Fernández de Velasco. He made a quick career, being promoted to ensign of cavalry and rising to the rank of captain of infantry before the age of 20. He took part in battles in the Netherlands, and was promoted to the rank of captain of cavalry in 1670. Salinas fought in the Franco-Dutch War, and remained in the Netherlands until 1673, when he returned to Spain and was directed to the army of Catalonia. In 1675, he was wounded in combat in the defense of Puigcerdà which was being attacked by the French. In December 1677, he returned to Murcia.

In 1685, Salinas y Rodríguez served as the field marshal of the Spanish infantry in Pamplona, and he requested admission into the Order of Santiago. This request was accepted after a thorough investigation of his ancestry. In Pamplona, he participated in battles of the Nine Years' War against the French in the hills of Alduide, where he managed to expel the invaders.

In June 1697, now with the rank of general of battle, he moved to Barcelona in an attempt to stop the advance of the French troops of the Duke of Vendôme. However, on 7 July, the city surrendered, and on 15 August Salinas's troops left the site. With the end of hostilities, Salinas was appointed “Sergeant Battle General” and given command of Girona, where he entered as acting governor in 1698, after the departure of the French. There he would remain at least until 1700, when he was appointed military governor (alcaide) of Gibraltar.

=== The Capture of Gibraltar ===
Salinas y Rodríguez was appointed Governor of Gibraltar by Philip V in December 1701. He arrived on The Rock in early 1702. With the start of hostilities in the War of the Spanish Succession and the threat of the Anglo-Dutch fleet, Salinas y Rodríguez requested reinforcements which were never sent. On 1 August 1704, English marines under the command of Prince George of Hesse-Darmstadt (who had been Viceroy of Catalonia until 1701) landed on the isthmus north of The Rock from the Bay of Gibraltar and after preparing a three-pronged attack plan sent a message asking for surrender. Salinas did not accept, and the city came under investment on 3 August by the Anglo-Dutch fleet. Recognising the gravity of the situation and the futility of further resistance, Salinas y Rodríguez surrendered on the morning of 4 August.

The capture of the city was apparently facilitated by the lack of a garrison capable of dealing with the Grand Alliance forces, and not for lack of ammunition and artillery pieces in good condition.

=== After Gibraltar ===
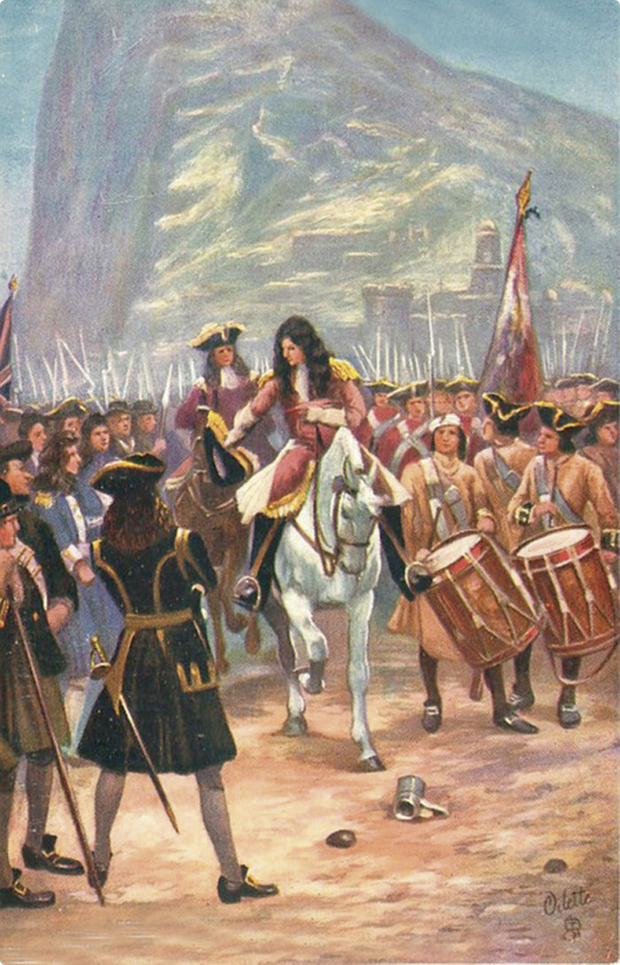
Diego de Salinas leaving Gibraltar

Some of his contemporaries, however, were critical of the Governor, recalling the episode of the capitulation of Barcelona in 1697. Nevertheless, Philip V seemed not to have taken such opinions into account as Salinas y Rodríguez was appointed Governor of Villaescusa de Haro, in Cuenca, in 1706 where he remained in a kind of voluntary exile until close to his death, when he returned to Madrid. He died in his hometown on 27 November 1720, leaving all his possessions to his sister, Francisca.
