= Battle of Montjuïc (1705) =

1705 battle

Coordinates: 41.3667°N 2.16667°E

The Battle of Montjuïc took place between 13 and 17 September 1705 during the War of the Spanish Succession. In the War of the Spanish Succession, a multinational force of the Second Grand Alliance, which supported Archduke Charles of Austria the Habsburg pretender to the Spanish throne, under the command of English general Charles Mordaunt, 3rd Earl of Peterborough landed on the Catalan coast on August 22, 1705, intending to capture Barcelona. However, the force first had to take possession of Montjuïc Castle which defended the city. The Spanish and Neapolitan defenders were commanded by Francisco de Velasco

Late on the night of 13 September, the Austrian force from the Grand Alliance under the command of George of Hesse-Darmstadt, also known as Prince George Louis of Hessen-Darmstadt and George Darmstadt approached the fortress. They reached the fortress before dawn on 14 September. English grenadiers cut off access to the fort and any hope for the garrison to receive reinforcements by capturing the covered way which gave access to the fort. A column under the English second in command, James Stanhope, acted as a diversion to draw the attention and fire of the defenders. Other forces attacked the rear of the castle. They were initially repulsed and Prince George was mortally wounded. Lord Petersborough brought up the main body of attackers, rallied the men who had retreated and they took the outer defences of the castle, held by the Spanish and Neapolitans who supporting the claim of the French Bourbon Prince, later Philip V of Spain, to the Spanish Crown.

Fighting carried on for several days but on 17 September, the fortress finally fell to the Grand Alliance forces after a mortar shot directed by Dutch Colonel Schellundt blew up the castle's powder magazine, killing the Neapolitan commander, Colonel Carracciolo and several officers. Peterborough established artillery batteries in the castle, which had a commanding position over the city of Barcelona from which they bombarded it until its surrender on 8 October 1705 at the conclusion of the Siege of Barcelona.
