= Siege of Barcelona (1697) =

1697 siege during the Nine Years' War

Coordinates: 41.3833°N 2.1667°E

- Part of Nine Years' War
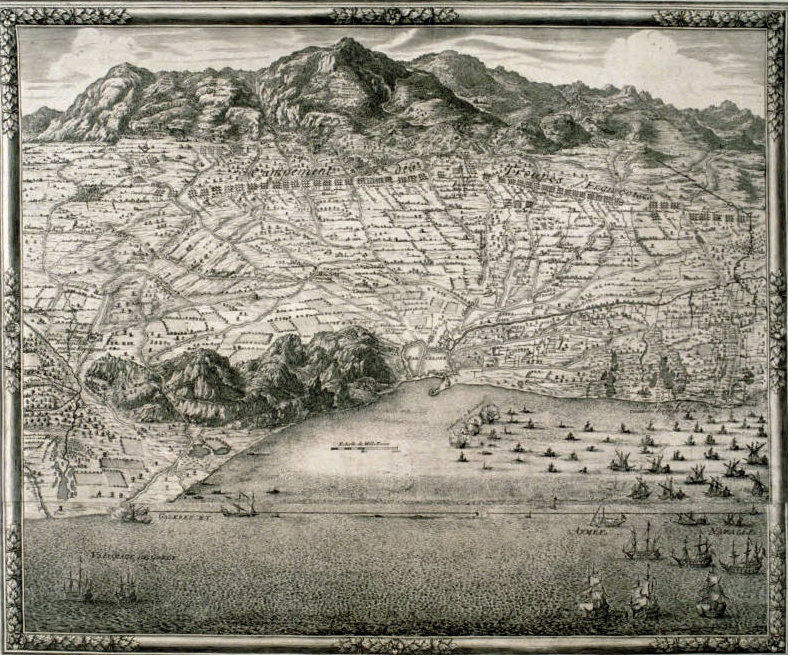
- Map of the siege by an unknown author printed in Paris.
Date	12 June – 10 August 1697
Location	Barcelona, Catalonia, Spain
Result	French victory

Belligerents
Kingdom of France	(Spain) Crown of Aragon

Commanders and leaders
(Kingdom of France) Duke of Vendôme	(Spain) Francisco de Velasco (Spain) George of Hesse-Darmstadt

Units involved
(Kingdom of France) Royal Danois	Unknown

Strength
25,000–32,000 men	Unknown

Casualties and losses
9,000 - 15,000	5,300 - 12,000

The siege of Barcelona of 1697 was successfully conducted during the Nine Years' War by France. Louis Joseph, Duke of Vendôme, commanding some 32,000 troops (reinforced with troops from the ended Italian front of the war), forced the garrison, under Prince George of Hesse-Darmstadt, to capitulate on 10 August. Nevertheless, it had been a hard fought contest: according to John Lynn, French casualties totalled around 9,000, while the losses on the Spanish side were 12,000 killed, wounded, or lost, although Antonio Espino López has set the figure for Spanish losses at 4,500 killed and 800 wounded, and the French casualties at 15,000, including 52 engineers.
