= Siege of Barcelona (1705) =

1705 siege of the War of the Spanish Succession

Coordinates: 41°24′07″N 2°10′17″E

- Part of War of the Spanish Succession
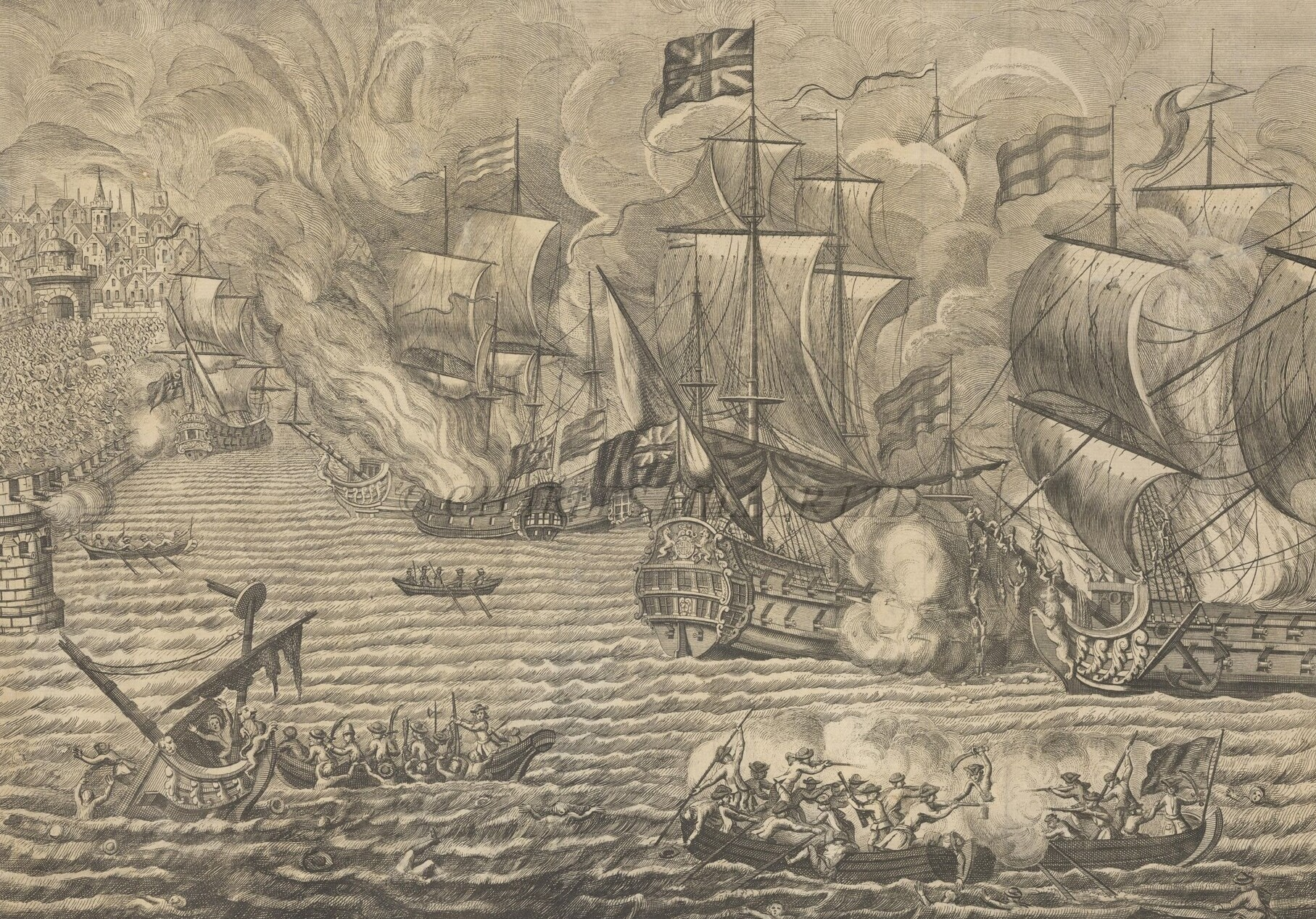
- 1738–1739 engraving of the siege
Date	14 September – 19 October 1705
Location	Barcelona, Principality of Catalonia, Spain
Result	Grand Alliance victory

Belligerents
Pro-Bourbon Spain	England; Austria; Portugal; Dutch Republic; Pro-Habsburg Spain

Commanders and leaders
(Spain) Francisco de Velasco	(Kingdom of England) Lord Peterborough (Kingdom of England) Earl Stanhope (Kingdom of England) Cloudesley Shovell (Dutch Republic) Philips van Almonde (Habsburg monarchy) Prince George †

Strength
5,800 5,000 infantry 800 cavalry	11,000 8,000 regulars 3,000 militia 52 ships 40 heavy siege guns

Casualties and losses
Entire garrison captured	Unknown

The siege of Barcelona took place between 14 September and 19 October 1705 during the War of the Spanish Succession when a multinational Grand Alliance army led by Lord Peterborough, supporting the Habsburg pretender to the Spanish throne, captured the city of Barcelona from its Spanish Bourbonic defenders, most of whom then joined the Habsburg army.

An attempted landing had been repulsed the previous year at the Landing at Barcelona. Following the city's capture by Peterborough, the Bourbons launched a concerted attempt to recapture it the following year during the 1706 siege of Barcelona, which failed. The city and Catalonia remained in Allied hands until reconquered by the Bourbons in 1714.

== Background ==
Following the outbreak of the war, Catalonia had been regarded as a base of support by the Allies in their campaign to put Archduke Charles on the Spanish throne in opposition to the rival French candidate Philip V. Barcelona was recommended as a potential target by the region's former Governor George of Hesse-Darmstadt. In 1704, he had attempted a landing outside the city but had been forced to withdraw. However he continued to believe that the Catalans would welcome Allied intervention due to their opposition to Madrid. The Bourbon authorities had clamped down with a series of repressive measures against the inhabitants.

The Allies captured Gibraltar and began looking for fresh bases that might be taken. In 1705, a fresh expedition of mainly Anglo-Dutch ships and soldiers set out from Lisbon. The Duke of Berwick, recently replaced in his post as French commander in Spain, was concerned about the likelihood of an attack on Barcelona and unsuccessfully recommended that 12,000 French reinforcements be moved south from France. The Governor of Barcelona believed the Allies were more likely to move against Nice.

Although the commanders of the expedition had orders that allowed them to choose between several different destinations including Cádiz and the major French naval base at Toulon, it was decided to attempt Barcelona again. Queen Anne promised to uphold the traditional liberties of the Catalans.

== Landing ==
The expedition was under the command of the English General Lord Peterborough, whose second-in-command was James Stanhope. They were accompanied by both Prince George and the Austrian Archduke Charles. The fleet carrying them, under Sir Cloudesley Shovell arrived off Barcelona on 16 August.

The city's defences had recently been repaired and strengthened and measures taken to make sure there was no rising by the Catalans in support of the Allies. Peterborough had been led to expect that he could count on the support of Catalan militias raised by the Count of Cifuentes.

On 23 August the Allied troops were landed three miles east of Barcelona. They were given a warm welcome by local inhabitants. Both Charles and Peterborough issued proclamations. In response to the landing, several thousand Catalan rebels gathered outside the city flying the Austrian flag. They blockaded Barcelona to prevent any supplies coming in. Some batteries were prepared under the command of the engineer Colonel John Richards. Charles initially forbade a bombardment of the city for fear of offending his potential subjects.

== Battle for the heights ==
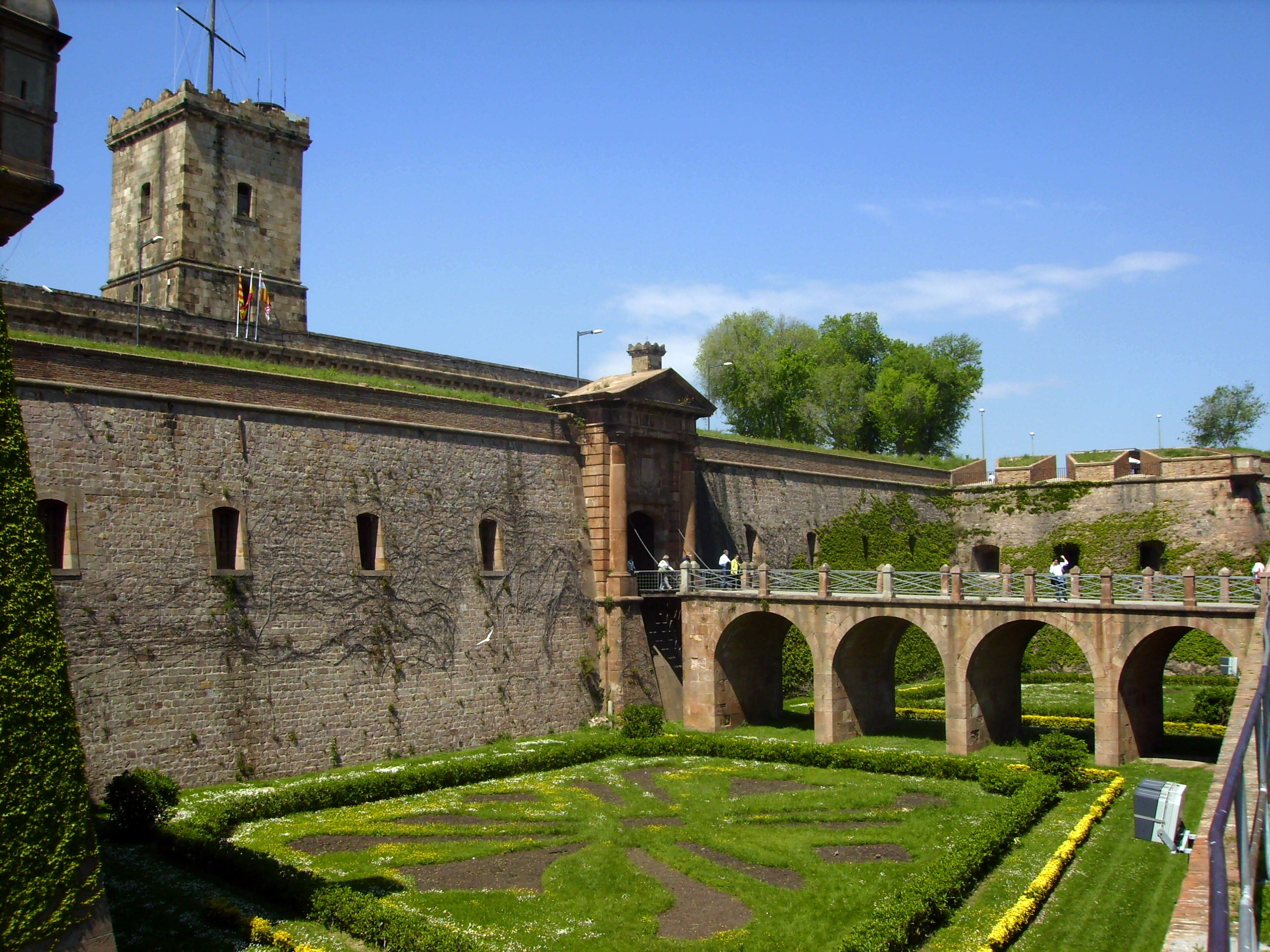
Montjuïc Castle was the target of an Allied assault in September 1705.

After the initial landing there was not much activity for several weeks. Peterborough was concerned that he had too few soldiers given the size of the garrison, and considered abandoning the siege and redeploying to Italy. However in councils of war he was opposed by Admiral Shovell representing the navy as well as many the Generals under his command who favoured an assault.

A major target for the Allies was the stronghold of Montjuïc, a major hill overlooking the city. In September Peterbrorough agreed to launch an attack, and to aid secrecy made a pretence that his Army was abandoning the siege and marching away towards Tarragona to the south. A British assault force led by William Southwell was readied, to be followed up by a reserve under General Stanhope. Although Prince George held no formal command, he accompanied the assault force as a volunteer and to help show them the way.

The attack met with heavier resistance than anticipated, and Prince George was struck by a musket ball in the thigh. The wound proved fatal, and the loss of the Prince led to a collapse in the morale of the assaulting party. The hill was taken in September during the Battle of Montjuïc.

== Bibliography ==
- Bodart, G. (1908). Militär-historisches Kriegs-Lexikon (1618-1905).
- Falkner, James. The War of the Spanish Succession 1701-1714. Pen and Sword, 2015.
- Hugill, J.A.C. No Peace Without Spain. Kensal Press, 1991.
- Williams, Basil. Stanhope: A Study in Eighteenth-Century War and Diplomacy. Clarendon Press, 1932.
