= Siege of Barcelona (1706) =

1706 siege

Coordinates: 41.4019°N 2.1667°E

- Part of War of the Spanish Succession
- The Relief of Barcelona, 30 April 1706; H. Vale, 1713
| Date | 3–27 April 1706 |
| Location | Barcelona, Principality of Catalonia, Spain |
| Result | Grand Alliance victory |

Belligerents
| England; Austria; Dutch Republic; Pro-Habsburg Spain | France; Pro-Bourbon Spain |

Commanders and leaders
| (Kingdom of England) Lord Peterborough (Kingdom of England) James Stanhope | (Spain) Philip V (Kingdom of France) René de Froulay de Tessé |

The siege of Barcelona took place between 3 and 27 April 1706 during the War of the Spanish Succession when a Franco-Spanish army laid siege to Barcelona in an attempt to recapture the city following its fall to an English-led Allied army the previous year. After the Earl of Peterborough entered Valencia in triumph in January 1706, Barcelona was left vulnerable. This led the French to change the plans of attacking Valencia and try to besiege Barcelona instead, while the city was blocked from the seaside by the Count of Toulouse. The Spanish forces were led by Philip V, while René de Froulay, Comte de Tessé was placed in charge of the French land forces during the siege.

Despite insufficient artillery and the constant harassment from Peterborough, who marched north with 3,000 men and attacked the besiegers from the mountains, the Franco-Spanish forces finally managed to shoot three breaches in the walls. But before the decision to storm the city could be made, the siege was abandoned, following the appearance of a large English fleet under the command of John Leake carrying reinforcements.

The Franco-Spanish army abandoned its supplies and artillery in its hasty retreat. Phillip was cut off from returning to Madrid, and so he crossed into France. Barcelona and the entire region of Catalonia remained in Allied hands until 1714. The documentary sources explain that the escape of Philip V caused great perplexity in all the chancelleries of Europe, but especially in that of Versailles, governed by his grandfather and patron Louis XIV of France.

After the Grand Alliance victory at Barcelona, the solar eclipse of May 12, 1706 was widely interpreted as the “eclipse of Sun King”, i.e., the dimming of Louis XIV, king of France, while the French court officially regarded the eclipse only as a scientific phenomenon.
