= John Shrimpton =

18th-century British Army officer

Major-General John Shrimpton
- Military career
- Allegiance: Kingdom of Great Britain
- Branch: British Army
- Rank: Major-General
- Conflicts: Nine Years' War; War of Spanish Succession

Major-General John Shrimpton was a British Army officer and member of parliament and the Governor of Gibraltar from 1704 to 1707.

== Military career ==
Shrimpton joined the Army becoming a Major in the 1st (Queen's Own) Foot Guards.

In 1693, during the Nine Years' War, he was wounded at the Battle of Landen in Flanders. In 1701 he became Member of Parliament for Whitchurch.

In 1704, when the Garrison at Gibraltar came under threat from the French, a force of 2,500 troops under Shrimpton's command was dispatched to reinforce the Garrison. Archduke Charles VI, acting on the recommendation of Queen Anne, asked Shrimpton to accept an appointment as Governor and he remained there until 1707.

Parliament of England
Preceded by Lord James Russell	Member of Parliament for Whitchurch; 1701–1707; With: Richard Wollaston	Succeeded by Parliament of Great Britain
Government offices
Preceded by Henry Nugent	Governor of Gibraltar; 1704–1707	Succeeded by Roger Elliott
