= Luis Antonio Tomás de Portocarrero =

Spanish noble and Viceroy

Luis Antonio Tomás Fernandez de Portocarrero y Moscoso, (7 March 1649 – 1723), 5th Count of Palma del Río, was a Spanish noble and Viceroy of Catalonia.

His father was Fernando Luis de Portocarrero, 4th Count of Palma del Rio and 2nd Marquis of Almenara. His mother was Antonia de Moscoso, daughter of Lope Hurtado de Mendoza y Moscoso, 8th conde de Monteagudo. His father died in the same year as he was born and his mother remarried with Enrique de Pimentel y Moscoso, former Viceroy of Aragon.
His uncle was Luis Manuel Fernández de Portocarrero y de Guzman, former Viceroy of Sicily, Cardinal of Toledo, and member of the Council of State under King Carlos II of Spain.

He married in 1667 with his cousin María Leonor de Moscoso and had 7 children, including

- Joaquín Fernández de Portocarrero (1681–1760), Austrian Viceroy of Sicily.

Luis Antonio Tomas was awarded the title of Grandee of Spain, 2nd class, by King Philip V of Spain, in 1697.
He became Viceroy of Catalonia between 1702 and 1703.
In 1710, he went over to the Austrian party, and was forced into exile after the defeat in 1714. His possessions were confiscated, but returned to his son Gaspar in 1724.

== Sources ==
- Castilla Maxerco
- Geneanet
- El gran diccionario historico
- http://helvia.uco.es/xmlui/bitstream/handle/10396/11791/Ambitos_29_09.pdf?sequence=1 Luis Antonio Portocarrero: el conde

desafecto (1710-1723)
