= List of viceroys of Catalonia =

This is a list of Spanish viceroys (also called lieutenants) of the Principality of Catalonia from 1479 to 1713.

- 1479–1493: Enrique de Aragón
- 1493–1495: Juan de Lanuza y Garabito
- 1495–1496: Juan Fernández de Heredia
- 1496–1501: Juan de Aragón, Conde de Ribagorza
- 1501–1514: Jaime de Luna
- 1514–1521: Alonso de Aragón, Archbishop of Zaragoza
- 1521–1523: Pere Folc de Cardona, Archbishop of Tarragona
- 1523–1525: Antonio de Zúñiga, Prior of Castile, Order of Saint John of Jerusalem
- 1525–1539: Fadrique de Portugal y Noroña, Bishop of Sigüenza
- 1539–1543: Saint Francis Borgia, 4th Duke of Gandia, 3rd General Father of the Jesuit Order
- 1543–1554: Juan Fernández Manrique de Lara, Marqués de Aguilar de Campoo
- 1554–1558: Pedro Afán de Ribera, Duque de Alcalá
- 1558–1564: García Álvarez de Toledo, 4th Marquis of Villafranca del Bierzo
- 1564–1571: Diego Hurtado de Mendoza y de la Cerda
- 1571–1580: Fernando de Toledo
- 1580–1581: Francisco de Moncada y Folc de Cardona, Marqués de Aytona
- 1581–1583: Carlo d'Aragona Tagliavia
- 1583–1586: Juan de Zúñiga y Avellaneda, Conde de Miranda del Castañar
- 1586–1590: Manrique de Lara y Girón, Conde de Valencia de Don Juan
- 1590–1592: Pedro Luis Galcerán de Borja y de Castro-Pinós
- 1592–1596: Bernardino de Cárdenas y Portugal, Duque de Maqueda
- 1596–1602: Lorenzo Suárez de Figueroa y Córdoba, Duque de Feria
- 1602–1603: Joan Terès i Borrull, Archbishop of Tarragona
- 1603–1611: Héctor de Pignatelli y Colonna, Duque de Monteleón
- 1611–1611: Pedro Manrique, Bishop of Tortosa
- 1611–1615: Francisco Hurtado de Mendoza, Marqués de Almazán
- 1615–1619: Francisco Fernández de la Cueva, 7th Duke of Alburquerque
- 1619–1622: Fernando Afán de Ribera y Téllez-Girón, 3rd Duke of Alcalá de los Gazules
- 1622–1626: Juan Sentís, Bishop of Barcelona
- 1626–1627: Luis Díez de Aux y Armendáriz, Bishop of Urgel
- 1627–1629: Miguel Santos de San Pedro, Bishop of Solsona
- 1629–1630: Gómez Suárez de Figueroa, 3rd Duke of Feria
- 1630–1632: Enrique de Aragón Folc de Cardona y Córdoba
- 1632–1633: Cardinal-Infante Fernando de Austria
- 1633–1638: Enrique de Aragón Folc de Cardona y Córdoba (2nd time)
- 1638–1640: Dalmau de Queralt, Count of Santa Coloma
- 1640–1640: Enrique de Aragón Folc de Cardona y Córdoba (3rd time)
- 1640–1640: García Gil Manrique, Bishop of Barcelona
- 1640–1642: Pedro Fajardo Requesens y Zúñiga, Marqués de los Vélez
- 1642–1644: Pedro Antonio de Aragón
- 1642–1644: Felipe de Silva
- 1644–1645: Andrea Cantelmo
- 1645–1647: Diego Felipez de Guzmán, Marquis of Leganés
- 1647–1648: Guillermo Ramón de Moncada, Marqués de Aytona
- 1648–1650: Juan de Garay y Otáñez, Marqués de Villarrubia
- 1650–1653: Francisco de Orozco, Marqués de Mortara
- 1653–1656: John of Austria the Younger
- 1656–1663: Francisco de Orozco, Marqués de Mortara (2nd time)
- 1663–1664: Francisco de Moura y Corterreal, Marqués de Castel Rodrigo
- 1664–1667: Vicente de Gonzaga y Doria
- 1667–1669: Gaspar Téllez-Girón, 5th Duke de Osuna
- 1669–1673: Francisco Fernández de Córdoba, Duque de Sessa
- 1673–1675: Francisco de Tutavilla y del Rufo, Duque de San Germán
- 1675–1676: Juan Antonio Pacheco Osorio Toledo, Marqués de Cerralbo
- 1676–1677: Alexander Farnese, Prince of Parma
- 1677–1678: Juan Domingo Méndez de Haro y Fernández de Córdoba
- 1678–1678: Diego Dávila Mesía y Guzmán, 3rd Marquis of Leganés
- 1678–1685: Alejandro de Bournonville, Duque de Bournonville
- 1685–1688: Diego Dávila Mesía y Guzmán, 3rd Marquis of Leganés (2nd time)
- 1688–1688: Juan Tomás Enríquez de Cabrera, Conde de Melga
- 1688–1690: Carlos de Gurrea Aragón y Borja, Duque de Villahermosa
- 1690–1693: Juan Alonso Pérez de Guzmán, Duque de Medina Sidonia
- 1693–1694: Juan Manuel Fernández Pacheco, 8th Marquis of Villena
- 1694–1696: Francisco Antonio de Agurto, Marquis of Gastañaga
- 1696–1698: Francisco de Velasco y Tovar, Conde de Melgar
- 1698–1701: Jorge de Hesse-Darmstadt, Landgrave of Hesse

During the War of the Spanish Succession, Catalonia was contested between the Bourbons and Habsburgs.

Viceroys named by Philip V of Spain:

- 1702–1703: Luis Fernández de Portocarrero, Conde de Palma
- 1703–1705: Francisco de Velasco y Tovar, Conde de Melgar (2nd time)
- 1705–1706: José Antonio de Mendoza, 3rd Marquis of Villagarcía
- 1706–1713: Claude François Bidal d'Asfeld

Viceroys named by Archduke Charles:

- 1706–1710: Leo Graf Ulfeldt
- 1711–1712: Elisabeth Christine of Brunswick-Wolfenbüttel
- 1713–1713: Guido von Starhemberg

In 1713, by the Nueva Planta decrees, King Philip V of Spain replaced the function Viceroy of Catalonia, with that of Captain General of Catalonia.

== French viceroys during the Reapers' War ==
During the Reapers' War or Catalan Revolt, the French occupied Catalonia and appointed viceroys to govern the territory in the name of the King of France, recognized as Count of Barcelona by the Catalan institutions.

- 1641–1642: Urbain de Maillé-Brézé
- 1642–1645: Philippe de La Mothe-Houdancourt (1st time)
- 1645–1647: Henri, Count of Harcourt
- 1647–1647: Louis II de Bourbon, Prince of Condé
- 1647–1648: Cardinal Mazarin
- 1649–1651: Louis de Bourbon, Duke of Mercœur
- 1651–1652: Philippe de La Mothe-Houdancourt (2nd time)
