= Francisco de Velasco y Tovar, Conde de Melgar =

Spanish noble and Viceroy of Catalonia

Francisco Antonio Fernández de Velasco y Tovar (1646 in Madrid – 1716), count of Melgar, was a Spanish noble and Viceroy of Catalonia.

== Biography ==
He was the illegitimate son of Íñigo Melchor de Velasco, 7th Duke of Frías and María de la Torre. His father had no legitimate sons and fully supported his career. In his youth, he fought in Portugal, Flanders and in 1674 in Catalonia against the French. He was appointed military Governor of Ceuta (1679-1689) and Cádiz (1689-1696).

=== Viceroy of Catalonia ===
==== 1690s ====
In 1696, he became Viceroy of Catalonia. Here he was confronted in 1697 with an invasion of French troops commanded by Louis Joseph de Bourbon, Duke of Vendôme which besieged and took Barcelona on 10 August. Velasco y Tovar was relieved of his post and replaced by Diego Hurtado de Mendoza y Sandoval, Conde de la Corzana.

==== 1700s ====
After the outbreak of the War of Spanish Succession, as a loyal supporter of the central government and the new King Philip V of Spain, he was again appointed Viceroy of Catalonia in 1703 instead of Prince George of Hesse-Darmstadt, who was too pro-Catalan and pro-Habsburg. He suppressed with an iron hand all opposition against the central government and was able to repulse an attempted landing by British and Catalan forces in 1704. But in 1705, he was unable to withstand a second attack on the city, as a consequence of which Barcelona and the whole of Catalonia went over to the camp of Charles of Habsburg, the Austrian pretender to the vacant Spanish Crown.

=== Later life ===
He went to live in Malaga and participated in the failed Siege of Barcelona in April 1706.
