= George Hills (journalist) =

British journalist and historian

George Albert Manuel Hills MBE ERD FRHistS (6 June 1918 – 13 September 2002) was a British journalist and historian. He was a BBC World Service broadcaster, Hispanist and a Fellow of the Royal Historical Society.

== Life ==
Hills was born in Mexico City, to a British father and a Spanish mother (from the Navarrese town of Olite), and was brought up in a bilingual environment. He got his first degree at King's College, University of London. Next he was commissioned in the Royal Artillery and during World War II he served as intelligence official in Europe and the Far East. In 1946 he joined the BBC being the South East Asia Programme Organiser in the BBC External Service. Next, he became the BBC South American Representative, living in Argentina with his wife, Marie, for two and a half years. Upon his return to the United Kingdom he held several positions such as Programmes Organiser for Spanish (from 1951 to 1959) and Latin American Spanish Services and Staff Training Officer for External Services. He lectured regularly in British universities about Spanish affairs. He retired from the BBC in 1977.

His historical works are all related to Hispanic issues: Franco-The Man and his Nation (1967), a biography of the Spanish caudillo Francisco Franco for which Hills was granted rarely given interviews; Spain (1970); Rock of Contention-A History of Gibraltar (1974) and The Battle for Madrid (1976). He could not finish his last work, a history of the Communist Party of Spain.

He was also involved in Spanish academic and journalist life upon the death of Franco. He helped found the Universidad Francisco de Vitoria in 1977.
