= George of Hesse-Darmstadt =

Austrian army field marshal

Prince George Louis of Hessen-Darmstadt
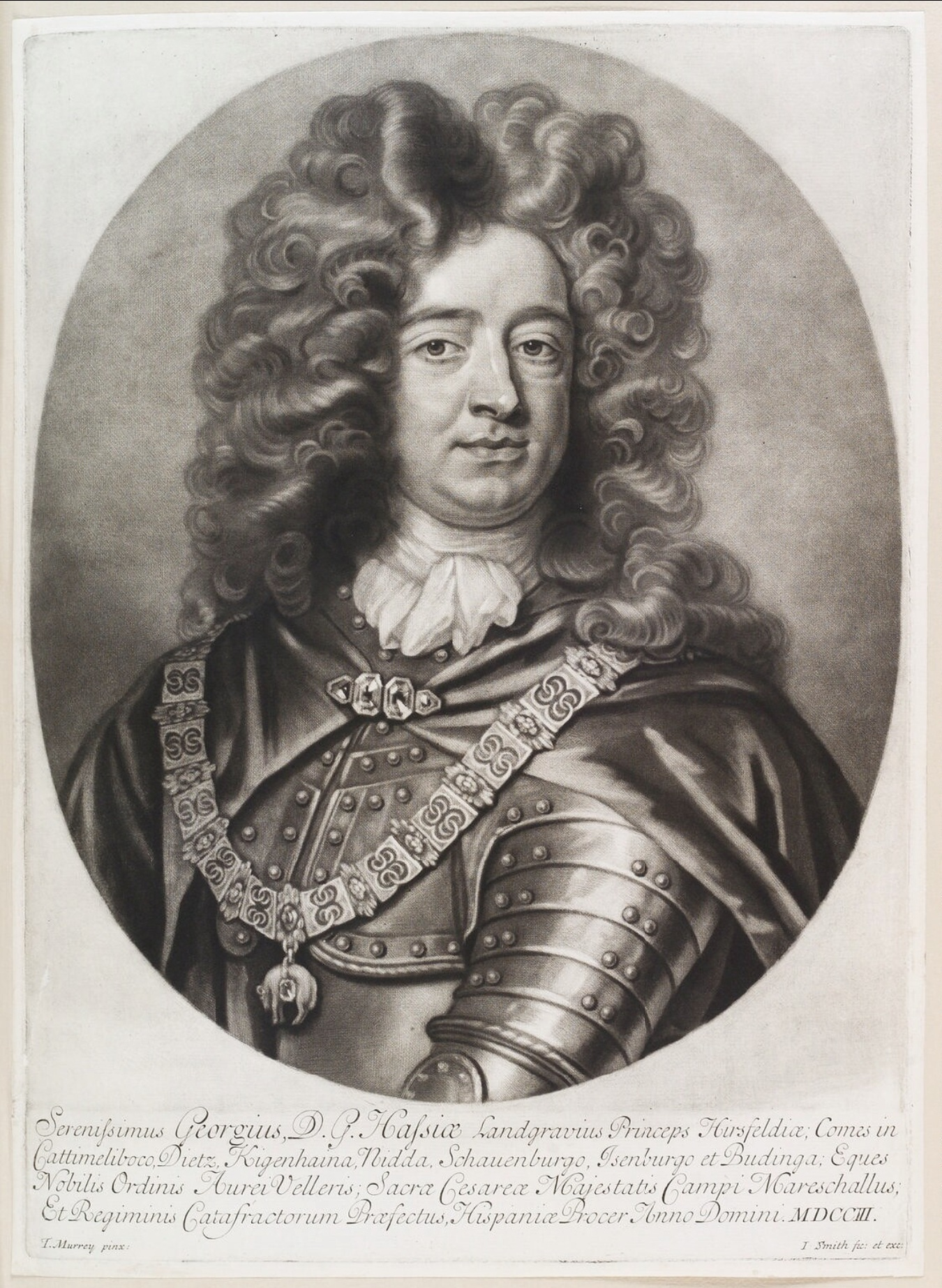
- Engraving by John Smith after a Thomas Murray portrait, 1703
- Born: 25 April 1669; Darmstadt, Hesse, Holy Roman Empire
- Died: 13 September 1705 (aged 36); Barcelona, Spain
- Military career
- Allegiance: Habsburg monarchy Habsburg Spain; Kingdom of England
- Rank: Generalfeldmarschall

Prince George Louis of Hessen-Darmstadt (25 April 1669 – 13 September 1705) was a Field Marshal in the Austrian army. He is known for his career in Habsburg Spain, as Viceroy of Catalonia (1698–1701), head of the Austrian army in the War of the Spanish Succession (1701–1705) and governor of Gibraltar in 1704. He was killed during the Siege of Barcelona the following year. He was known in Spanish as Jorge de Darmstadt and in Catalan as Jordi Darmstadt.

== Early life ==
Born in Darmstadt, Hessen, Germany in 1669, George Louis of Hesse-Darmstadt was the third son of Louis VI, Landgrave of Hesse-Darmstadt. After the early death of his father, he was raised by his mother Elisabeth Dorothea of Saxe-Gotha-Altenburg. In 1686 he undertook a "Grand Tour" through France and Switzerland.

As youngest son, he had little chance of becoming Landgrave, and therefore he was destined for a military career.

== Military career ==
First he fought against the Turks under Prince Eugene of Savoy. He was present at the Battle of Mohacs. Then he joined William III of Orange in the Irish campaign. After his return he converted to Catholicism and became Generalfeldwachtmeister (equivalent to major-general) in the Austrian Army in 1692, at the age of 23.

Then he fought against the French in the Nine Years' War. In 1695 he was sent by the Emperor to Spain at the head of an army-unit of 2,000 German soldiers to help defend Catalonia against superior French army and navy forces.

In 1697 he defended Barcelona which was under siege by Vendôme by land and admiral D’Estrées by sea. Finally the city surrendered after a siege of 52 days. This was ordered from Madrid and against the will of prince George Louis.

== Later life ==
After the war he was honoured in Spain and made a knight in 1697 of the Order of the Golden Fleece. After the withdrawal of the French, he became Viceroy of Catalonia, being recorded in the Spanish official records as Jorge de Darmstadt. He learned some Catalan and initiated some reforms, making him quite popular in the region. In 1699 he was appointed General der Kavallerie (General of Cavalry).

But in 1700 King Carlos II died and was succeeded as king by the French Philip V. Prince George Louis was replaced in 1701 by a pro-Bourbon Viceroy: Luis Antonio Tomás Fernández de Portocarrero, and he returned to Austria. There, he was ordered by the Emperor Leopold to negotiate an alliance with England and Portugal to support the claims to the Spanish throne of Leopold's son, the Archduke Charles.

After the start of the War of the Spanish Succession he was appointed the head of the Austrian troops supporting Archduke Charles's cause in Spain. In January 1704, Admiral Sir George Rooke with Prince George on board sailed from Lisbon for Barcelona, hoping it would declare for Archduke Charles. This proved false and the fleet returned to Lisbon after a brush with French naval forces heading to Toulon. On 31 July upon the suggestion of Prince George and under his command, 1,800 Dutch and English Marines were landed near Gibraltar, took the fortress along with Sir George Rooke, Admiral of the Fleet (1702–1704) and defended it successfully against a Spanish-French siege, holding off repeated attacks. Following the arrival of Allied reinforcements and supplies, enabling Prince George to take the offensive, the siege was abandoned in April 1705. He left Gibraltar and took command of the conquest of Barcelona and was killed on 13 September, storming the citadel of Montjuich.

His body was embalmed and buried in the Església dels Josepets de Gràcia. His heart was sent in 1711 to Darmstadt, where it remains in the Stadtkirche today. He is known by the Catalans as Príncep Jordi (Prince George). A street in Barcelona was named after him: Carrer del Príncep Jordi.

== Ancestors ==
Ancestors of George of Hesse-Darmstadt

16. George I, Landgrave of Hesse-Darmstadt
8. Louis V, Landgrave of Hesse-Darmstadt
17. Magdalene of Lippe
4. George II, Landgrave of Hesse-Darmstadt
18. John George, Elector of Brandenburg
9. Magdalena von Brandenburg
19. Elisabeth of Anhalt-Zerbst
2. Louis VI, Landgrave of Hesse-Darmstadt
20. Christian I, Elector of Saxony
10. John George I, Elector of Saxony
21. Sophie of Brandenburg
5. Sophia Eleonore of Saxony
22. Albert Frederick, Duke of Prussia
11. Duchess Magdalene Sibylle of Prussia
23. Marie Eleonore of Cleves
1.Prince George of Hesse-Darmstadt
24. John William, Duke of Saxe-Weimar
12. John II, Duke of Saxe-Weimar
25. Dorothea Susanne of Simmern
6. Ernest I, Duke of Saxe-Gotha
26. Joachim Ernest, Prince of Anhalt
13. Dorothea Maria of Anhalt
27. Eleonore of Württemberg
3. Elisabeth Dorothea of Saxe-Gotha-Altenburg
28. Frederick William I, Duke of Saxe-Weimar
14. John Philip, Duke of Saxe-Altenburg
29. Countess Palatine Anna Maria of Neuburg
7. Princess Elisabeth Sophie of Saxe-Altenburg
30. Henry Julius, Duke of Brunswick-Wolfenbüttel
15. Elisabeth of Brunswick-Wolfenbüttel
31. Elizabeth of Denmark

== See also ==
- Zemlya Georga

Government offices
Preceded by Francisco de Velasco y Tovar, Conde de Melgar	Viceroy of Catalonia; 1698–1701	Succeeded by Luis Fernández de Portocarrero, Conde de Palma
Preceded by Diego de Salinas	Governor of Gibraltar; 4 August 1704 — 14 September 1705	Succeeded by Henry Nugent, Count of Valdesoto
