= Thomas Erle =

English army general and politician (1650–1720)

General The Right Honourable Thomas Erle DL
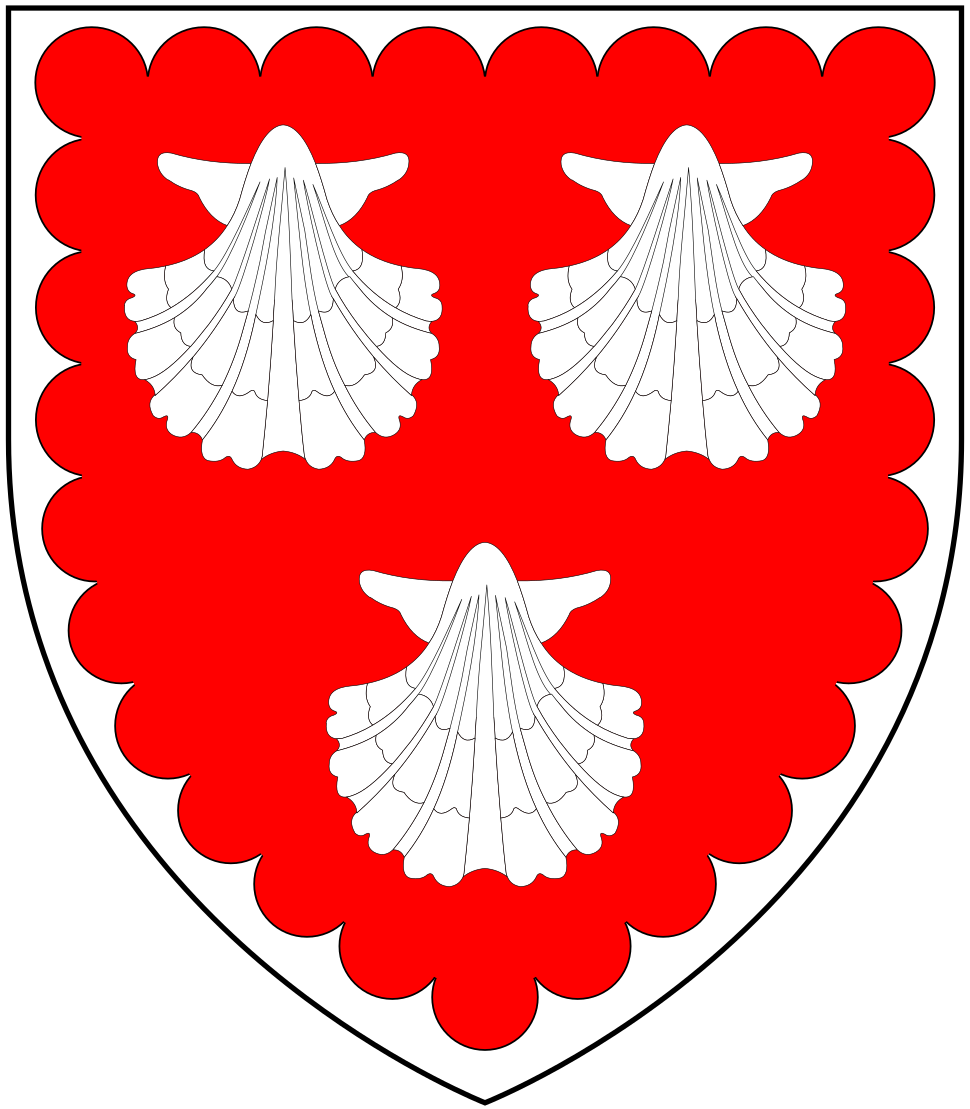
- Arms of Erle: Gules, three escallops argent a bordure engrailed of the last
- Born: 1650; England
- Died: 23 July 1720 (aged 69–70); England
- Burial place: Charborough, Dorset
- Spouse: Elizabeth Wyndham
- Relatives: Thomas Erle (father)
- Military career
- Allegiance: Kingdom of England; Kingdom of Great Britain
- Branch: Army
- Rank: General
- Conflicts: 1685: Battle of Bridport; 1690: Battle of the Boyne; 1690: Siege of Limerick; 1691: Battle of Aughrim; 1692: Battle of Steinkeerke; 1693: Battle of Landen; 1707: Battle of Almanza
- Other work: Deputy Lieutenant of Dorset, Governor of Portsmouth, MP, Commander-in-Chief (Ireland), Lord Justice (Ireland), PC

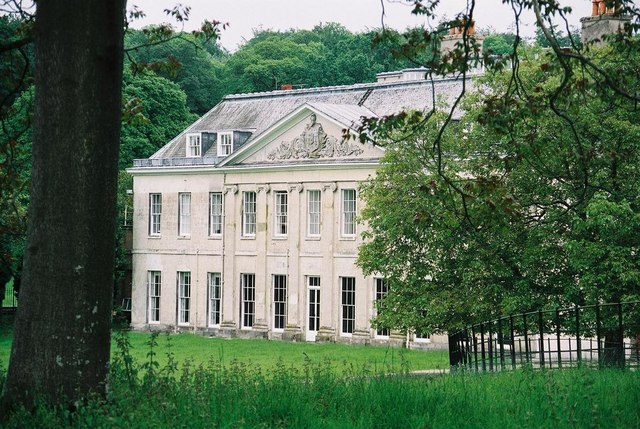
Charborough House

General Thomas Erle PC PC (Ire) DL (1650 – 23 July 1720) of Charborough, Dorset, was a general in the English Army and, thereafter, the British Army. He was also a Whig politician who sat in the House of Commons of England and of Great Britain from 1678 to 1718. He was Governor of Portsmouth and a Lieutenant-General of the Ordnance.

== Life ==
Erle was born in 1650, the second son of Thomas Erle and his wife Susanna Fiennes, daughter of William Fiennes, 1st Viscount Saye and Sele, of Charborough. He matriculated at Trinity College, Oxford, on 12 July 1667, aged 17 and was admitted at Middle Temple in 1669. In 1675, Erle married Elizabeth Wyndham (died 1710), daughter of Sir William Wyndham, 1st Baronet of Orchard Wyndham, Somerset.

Erle succeeded his elder brother before 1665 and his grandfather to Charborough in 1665.

In February 1679, Erle was returned unopposed as a Member of Parliament (MP) for Wareham (a pocket borough controlled by his family) into the first Exclusion Parliament. He voted for exclusion. At the second general election in 1679, Erle was again returned unopposed, but left no record in the second Exclusion Parliament. He was returned unopposed again at the 1681 English general election but was again inactive. At the 1685 English general election Erle was returned unopposed again, and was named to committees in Parliament but was called away in response to Monmouth's invasion. On 27 May 1685, he was made Deputy Lieutenant of Dorset. Erle took command of the East Dorset militia as major, and fought as a volunteer at the Battle of Sedgemoor with his friend Thomas Chafin. Subsequently, he was presented to the King by Lord Churchill but received a cold reception from James II.

In 1686, Erle hosted a group of conspirators who met at Charborough House to plan the overthrow of "the tyrant race of Stuarts". This meeting lead to the Invitation to William, signed by the Immortal seven, and resulting in the Glorious Revolution.

Erle was returned again as MP for Wareham at the 1689 English general election. He was promoted to colonel of a foot regiment and on 8 March 1689 was sent to Ireland to fight the combined French and Irish Army of the deposed King James II of England. For the remainder of his political career he seems to have been a consistent Whig.

At the 1690 English general election, Erle was returned as MP for Wareham in a contest. In July 1690, he took part in the Battle of the Boyne and the Siege of Limerick. He also took part in the concluding Battle of Aughrim in July 1691. Erle was infrequently in Parliament and his contributions were usually on military matters. In 1692, he was posted to Flanders and on 3 August 1692 was Colonel of the former Luttrell's Regiment at the Battle of Steenkerque. Henceforth, the regiment Erle raised in 1689 became the 2nd Battalion of the former Luttrell's Regiment, later the Green Howards. In Parliament he spoke against a motion to employ only English officers in the army and became involved in mutiny bills. In 1693, Erle was promoted to Brigadier-General, and was wounded in the Battle of Landen in 1693.

Erle returned home and carried up the mutiny bill on 27 February 1694. He was appointed Governor of Portsmouth in July 1694, and held the position until 1712. He was returned unopposed for Wareham at the 1695 English general election. Erle was again involved in the management of the mutiny bill, he signed the Association, and voted with the Court in March 1696 to fix the price of guineas at 22 shillings. In 1696, Erle was made a Major-General. He voted for the attainder of Sir John Fenwick on 25 November 1696 and spoke against a reduction of the military establishment on 8 January 1698. At the 1698 English general election, under a sharing agreement with a Tory, George Pitt, he had his nephew returned at Wareham and was himself returned unopposed as MP for Portsmouth on the government interest. Erle was a Court supporter and spoke and voted against the third reading of the disbanding bill on 18 January 1699.

In 1699, Erle lost one of his regiments and returned to Ireland as second in command to Lord Galway. He was appointed an Irish Privy Councillor. He was returned again as MP for Portsmouth in the two elections of 1701. However at the second election of that year, Erle was also returned as MP for Wareham and chose to sit there. He brought in the mutiny bill on 5 February 1702, and told against an amendment to it on 16 February. Erle was given leave to go to Ireland on 4 March 1702, having been appointed Commander-in-Chief of the land forces in Ireland under the Earl of Rochester. He was made a Lord Justice of Ireland and then promoted to Lieutenant-General. Erle stood again at Wareham and Portsmouth at the 1702 English general election and chose to sit for Wareham again.

In 1703, Erle became MP for Cork City in the Irish Parliament and held this seat until 1713. He was given command of a newly raised regiment of dragoons in June 1704 and did not vote for the Tack on 28 November 1704. In 1705, Erle was appointed Lieutenant-General of the Ordnance, a post which he held until 1712. He was also returned again as MP for Wareham at the 1705 English general election. Erle supported the Court choice of Speaker on 25 October 1705 and was named to the drafting committee on the mutiny bill on 23 January 1706. He voted with the government over the regency bill on 18 February 1706. Erle managed the mutiny bill through the House, and chaired the committee of the whole on 6 March 1706.

In January 1707, Erle took part in an expedition to Spain, fighting in the Battle of Almanza on 23 April 1707 – some reports state that he lost his right hand. and remained there until September. During the debate on the deficiency of English troops at Almanza, Erle defended Lord Galway, the commander, in the Commons on 24 February 1708. At the 1708 general election, he was returned for Wareham and Portsmouth and sat as Whig MP for Wareham. Erle was then told that he was to be commander-in-chief of an attack on the French coast. He was annoyed with the posting, especially as his pay had been stopped when he came back from Spain. Erle was awarded arrears of pay and given a further £1,500 in consideration of his services. The expedition was late in starting and the plan to land at St Valery to capture Abbeville was abandoned. The force eventually landed at Ostend and set up an outpost at Leffingham, which fell to the French without a fight on 16 October 1708. In spite of the failure, when Erle returned home in December 1708, he was appointed commander-in-chief of land forces in England. He voted for the naturalization of the Palatines in 1709, and for the impeachment of Dr Sacheverell in 1710. In January 1711, he was promoted to full general.

Erle was returned at Wareham again in 1710 and 1713. In 1714, following the death of Queen Anne, Erle was appointed Lieutenant-General of the Ordnance for a second time. The same year, he was also made Governor of Portsmouth, replacing Lord North and Grey, whose loyalty to the new king was in doubt. Erle was returned as MP for Wareham at the 1715 general election. From 1715 until 1718 he was Father of the House. He was forced to resign all his posts and his seat in Parliament in March 1718 and received in return a pension of £1,200 a year.

Erle died on 23 July 1720 and was buried at Charborough. He left a daughter Frances, who married Edward Ernle and died on 14 May 1728. Charborough House thus passed to the Ernle family.

Parliament of England
Preceded by George Pitt; Robert Culliford	Member of Parliament for Wareham; 1679–1698; With: George Savage 1679–1685; George Ryves 1685–1689; Thomas Skinner 1689–1690; William Okeden 1690–1695; Thomas Trenchard 1695–1698	Succeeded by Thomas Trenchard; George Pitt
Preceded by Nicholas Hedger; Matthew Aylmer	Member of Parliament for Portsmouth; 1698–1702; With: Sir George Rooke	Succeeded by Sir George Rooke; John Gibson
Preceded by Thomas Trenchard; George Pitt	Member of Parliament for Wareham; 1701; With: George Pitt	Succeeded by George Pitt; Sir Edward Ernle
Preceded by George Pitt; Sir Edward Ernle	Member of Parliament for Wareham; 1701–1707; With: George Pitt 1701–1702, 1705–1707; Sir Josiah Child 1702–1704; Sir Edward Ernle 1704–1705	Succeeded by Parliament of Great Britain
Preceded by Sir George Rooke; John Gibson	Member of Parliament for Portsmouth; 1702; With: Sir George Rooke	Succeeded by Sir George Rooke; William Gifford
Parliament of Great Britain
Preceded by Parliament of England	Member of Parliament for Wareham; 1707–1718; With: George Pitt 1707–1710, 1713–1715; Sir Edward Ernle 1710–1713; George Pitt, Jnr. 1715–1718	Succeeded by George Pitt, Jnr. Henry Drax
Preceded by Sir George Rooke; William Gifford	Member of Parliament for Portsmouth; 1708; With: George Churchill	Succeeded by George Churchill; Sir Thomas Littleton
Preceded by Sir Richard Onslow	Father of the House; 1715–1718	Succeeded by Edward Vaughan
Parliament of Ireland
Preceded by Alan Brodrick; Robert Rogers	Member of Parliament for Cork City; 1703–1713; With: Alan Brodrick 1703–1710; Edward Hoare 1710–1713	Succeeded by Edward Hoare; St John Brodrick
Military offices
Preceded by Francis Luttrell	Colonel of Thomas Erle's Regiment of Foot; 1691–1712	Succeeded by George Freke
Preceded by Thomas Tollemache	Governor of Portsmouth; 1694–1712	Succeeded by The Lord North and Grey
Preceded by The Lord Granville	Lieutenant-General of the Ordnance; 1705–1712	Succeeded by John Hill
Preceded by John Hill	Lieutenant-General of the Ordnance; 1714–1718	Succeeded by Thomas Micklethwait
Preceded by The Lord North and Grey	Governor of Portsmouth; 1714–1718	Succeeded by Charles Wills
