= Richard Leake =

English master gunner

Captain Richard Leake
- Born: c. 1629; Harwich, Essex
- Died: July 1696 (aged 36–37); Woolwich, London
- Spouse: Unknown
- Children: John Leake
- Military career
- Allegiance: Kingdom of England
- Branch: Royal Navy
- Rank: Captain
- Conflicts: Second Dutch War

Richard Leake (c. 1629 – 1696) was an English naval officer and master-gunner of England.

== Life ==
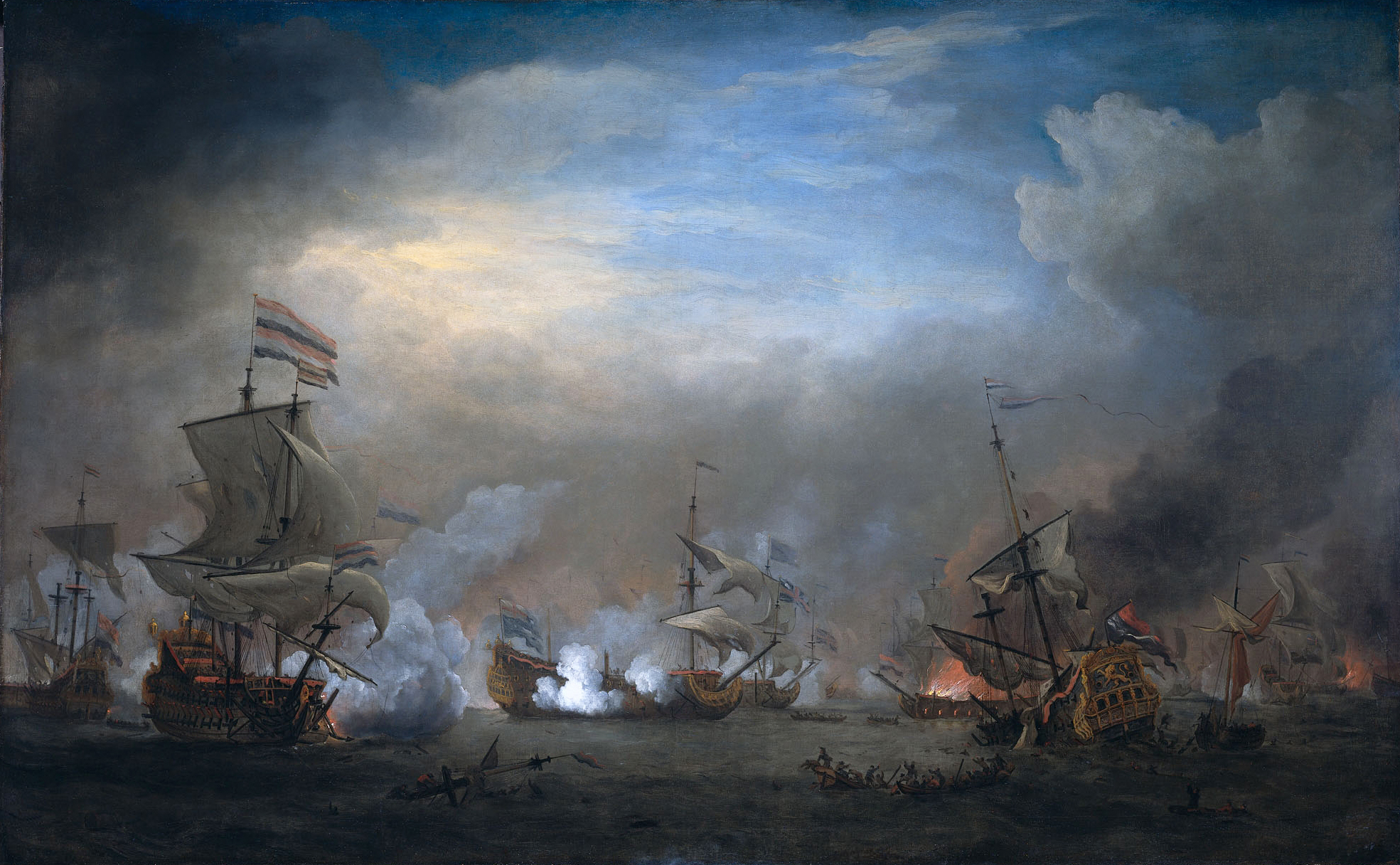
The Prince Royal dismasted at the Battle of Texel

Richard Leake, son of Richard Leake, was born at Harwich in 1629. According to Martin Leake's biography of Sir John Leake, he served under his father in the Navy under the Parliament, but being a Royalist at heart took an opportunity of deserting and entered the King's service. His Majesty's affairs proving very unfortunate, more especially by sea, he went to Holland and served in the Dutch army. It does not, however, appear that the elder Leake commanded a state's ship, and the only service of the King at sea that the lad can have entered was the semi-piratical squadron under Prince Rupert. After being some time in Holland he was able to return to England, and commanded a merchant ship in several voyages to the Mediterranean. At the Restoration he was appointed gunner of the Princess, and in her fought in many severe actions during the Second Dutch War. In one, in the North Sea, on 20 April 1667, the Princess was engaged with seventeen vessels, apparently Rotterdam privateers, and though hard pressed succeeded in beating them off. She then went to Gottenburg, and in the return voyage was attacked by two Danish ships on 17 May. The captain and master were killed, the lieutenant was badly wounded, and the command devolved on Leake, who after a stubborn fight beat them off and brought the ship safely to the Thames. He was given 30l., and by warrant, 13 August 1667, was appointed "one of his majesty's gunners within the Tower of London, in consideration of his good and faithful service to his majesty during the war with the French, Danes, and Dutch".

In May 1669 he was promoted to be gunner of the Royal Prince, a first rate, which carried the flag of Sir Edward Spragge in the battle with the Dutch of 10 August 1673. The Royal Prince was dismasted; many of her guns were dismounted; some four hundred of her men were killed or wounded; Spragge had shifted his flag to the St. George; and a large Dutch ship with two fireships bore down on her, making certain of capturing or of burning her. It is said that Rooke (afterwards Sir George), her first lieutenant and commander, judging further defence impossible, ordered the colours to be struck, and that Leake countermanding the order, and sending Rooke off the quarterdeck, took the command on himself, saying, "The Royal Prince shall never be given up while I am alive to defend her". His two sons, Henry and John, gallantly supported him; the men recovered from their panic; the fireships were sunk, the man-of-war beaten off, and the Royal Prince brought to Chatham, but Henry Leake, the eldest son, was killed. The story is probably founded on fact, but is certainly much exaggerated.

The Royal Prince being unserviceable, Leake was moved into the Neptune, and shortly afterwards was given the command of one of the yachts, and appointed also to be master-gunner of Whitehall. By patent, 21 May 1677, he was constituted master-gunner of England and storekeeper of his Majesty's ordnance and stores of war at Woolwich. In 1683 he attended Lord Dartmouth to Tangier to demolish the fortifications. He is described as skilful and ingenious in his art, as the originator of the method of igniting the fuzes of shell by the firing of the mortar, and as the contriver of the "infernals" used at St. Malo in 1693. He invented also what seems to have been a sort of howitzer, which is spoken of as a "cushee-piece", to fire shell and carcasses; in theory it seemed a formidable arm, but in practice it was found more dangerous to its friends than to its enemies, and never came into general use. In practising with it at Woolwich Leake's youngest son, Edward, was killed in September 1688. Leake died and was buried at Woolwich in July 1696. One son, John, and a daughter, Elizabeth, survived him.

== Bibliography ==
- Laughton, John Knox (1892). "Leake, Richard" . In Lee, Sidney (ed.). Dictionary of National Biography. Vol. 32. London: Smith, Elder & Co. pp. 321–322.
