= Richard Kyrle =

English politician

Sir Richard Kyrle (c. 1610 – 31 August 1684) was an English politician who briefly served as Governor of the Province of Carolina in 1684.

== Biography ==
Kyrle was born in England, the son of James Kyrle and Ann Waller of Walford Court, Hertfordshire. By 1659 he had moved to Ireland and was recorded in a town census in County Cork. On 19 May 1661 he was knighted, and the same year he was elected to the Irish House of Commons as a Member of Parliament for Cork City. Under the Act of Settlement 1662, Kyrle was granted the lands of Dromaneen Castle; the castle itself had been destroyed during the Irish Confederate Wars. Around this time he built an ironworks at Clonmeen; this had ceased to be active by 1685.

On 29 April 1684, Kyrle was made a landgrave and commissioned to be governor by the Lords Proprietors of the Province of Carolina. He and his wife, Mary Jephson, arrived in the colony in late July or early August, but his short tenure as governor was ended by his death in Charleston at the end of August 1684. His wife died the following month.

Parliament of Ireland
Preceded by Sir Andrew Barrett; Dominick Roche	Member of Parliament for Cork City; 1661–1668; With: Sir Peter Courthorpe	Succeeded by James Fitz Edmond Cotter; John Galway
