= HMS Newcastle (1704) =

Ship of the line of the Royal Navy

History

Great Britain
- Name: HMS Newcastle
- Builder: Sir J. Allin, Sheerness Dockyard
- Launched: 10 March 1704
- Fate: Broken up, 1746

General characteristics as built
- Class & type: 50-gun fourth rate ship of the line
- Tons burthen: 676 BOM
- Length: 130 ft 2 in (39.7 m) (gundeck)
- Beam: 34 ft 2 in (10.4 m)
- Depth of hold: 13 ft 7 in (4.1 m)
- Propulsion: Sails
- Sail plan: Full-rigged ship
- Armament: 50 guns of various weights of shot

General characteristics after 1732 rebuild
- Class & type: 1719 Establishment 50-gun fourth rate ship of the line
- Tons burthen: 759 bm
- Length: 134 ft (40.8 m) (gundeck)
- Beam: 36 ft (11.0 m)
- Depth of hold: 15 ft 2 in (4.6 m)
- Propulsion: Sails
- Sail plan: Full-rigged ship
- Armament: 50 guns: Gundeck: 22 × 18-pdrs; Upper gundeck: 22 × 9-pdrs; Quarterdeck: 4 × 6-pdrs; Forecastle: 2 × 6-pdrs

HMS Newcastle was a 50-gun fourth rate ship of the line of the Royal Navy, built by Joseph Allin the elder at Sheerness Dockyard and launched on 10 March 1704.

== Service history ==
Newcastle was built at Sheerness by Sir J. Allin, and commissioned in 1704 under the command of Captain Vincent Cutter during the War of the Spanish Succession. Newcastle was attached to Admiral Sir John Leake's squadron, and took part in the Battle of Cabrita Point on 21 March 1705. In 1706–07 she served in Admiral George Byng's squadron in the Mediterranean, and by September 1708 was under the command of Captain Henry Herbert as part of Admiral James Mighells' squadron in the North Sea.

She sailed to Saint Helena in 1709 under the command of Captain Sampson Bourne, and was operating in the West Indies in 1711, part of the squadron commanded by Commodore James Littleton. On 10 June 1711 Newcastle engaged a French flotilla consisting of a 36-gun ship, a 24-gun hag-boat, nine privateer sloops, and two other vessels off Martinique, successfully driving them "in a very shattered condition" into the harbour of St. Pierre, and putting an end to their expedition against Antigua. On 11 August 1711 she took part in the Battle of Cartagena.

In 1713–14 she served under the command of Captain Richard Leake in the West Indies and Newfoundland, in 1717–18 under the command of Captain W. Passenger in Newfoundland and the Straits, and in 1719–20 was commanded by Captain J. Mihill in the Mediterranean, returning to Britain in 1721 commanded by Captain Edward Falkingham.

Orders were issued on 31 May 1728 for Newcastle to be taken to pieces and rebuilt at Woolwich according to the 1719 Establishment of dimensions. She was relaunched on 6 January 1732.

Newcastle was recommissioned and served under the command of Captain Ellis Brand in the West Indies from 1734 until 1736. She was recommissioned under the command of Captain Edward Baker in May 1738, serving in the Mediterranean into 1739. She was under the command of Captain T. Fox from October 1739, serving in the Channel until 1742, then in the Mediterranean until 1744. In April 1745 she was under the command of Captain J. Watkins in the Channel.

Newcastle was broken up in 1746.
