= William Gifford (Royal Navy officer) =

British politician (1649–1724)

Captain Sir William Gifford
- Born: c. 1649
- Died: 1724 (aged 74–75)
- Military career
- Allegiance: Kingdom of Great Britain
- Branch: Royal Navy
- Rank: Captain
- Commands: Portsmouth Dockyard; Greenwich Hospital

Captain Sir William Gifford (c.1649-1724) was a Royal Navy officer and member of parliament.

== Career ==
Born the son of Sir Richard Gifford of King's Somborne, Gifford joined the Royal Navy around 1670 and was promoted to captain in 1682. He became was appointed by the Navy Board Resident Commissioner, Portsmouth on 18 June 1702 until 14 January 1705 and the Governor of Greenwich Hospital in 1708.

Gifford also served as member of parliament for Portsmouth from 1702 to 1708 and from 1711 to 1713.

Parliament of England
Preceded by Thomas Erle; Sir George Rooke	Member of Parliament for Portsmouth; 1702–1707; With: Sir George Rooke	Succeeded by Parliament of Great Britain
Parliament of Great Britain
Preceded by Parliament of England	Member of Parliament for Portsmouth; 1707–1708; With: Sir George Rooke	Succeeded by Thomas Erle; George Churchill
Preceded by John Jennings; Rear-Admiral Sir Charles Wager	Member of Parliament for Portsmouth; 1711–1713; With: Admiral Sir James Wishart	Succeeded by Admiral Sir James Wishart; Sir Thomas Mackworth
Military offices
Preceded by Sir Thomas Hopsonn	Governor, Greenwich Hospital; 1708–1714	Succeeded by Lord Aylmer
