= Edward Hoare (politician) =

Anglo-Irish politician

Edward Hoare (died 20 July 1765) was an Anglo-Irish politician.

Hoare was the son of Edward Hoare, who had himself served as Mayor and Sheriff of Cork, and Sarah Burnell. His father was a wealthy merchant who with his brother founded Hoare's Bank. He held the office of Sheriff of Cork City in 1707–08 and in 1710 served as Lord Mayor of Cork. Between 1710 and 1727 he sat in the Irish House of Commons as the Member of Parliament for Cork City.

He married, firstly, Grace Burton, daughter of Benjamin Burton and Grace Stratford, in 1703. Together they had three children. He married, secondly, Anne Grant, daughter of Thomas Grant, on 27 August 1715, and they had one son. He was the father of Sir Joseph Hoare, 1st Baronet.

Parliament of Ireland
Preceded by Alan Brodrick; Thomas Erle	Member of Parliament for Cork City; 1710–1727; With: Thomas Erle to 1713; St John Brodrick 1713–1715; Edmond Knapp 1715–1727	Succeeded by Hugh Dixon, or Dickson; Edward Webber
