= George Rooke =

Royal Navy officer and politician (1650–1709)

Admiral of the Fleet Sir George Rooke
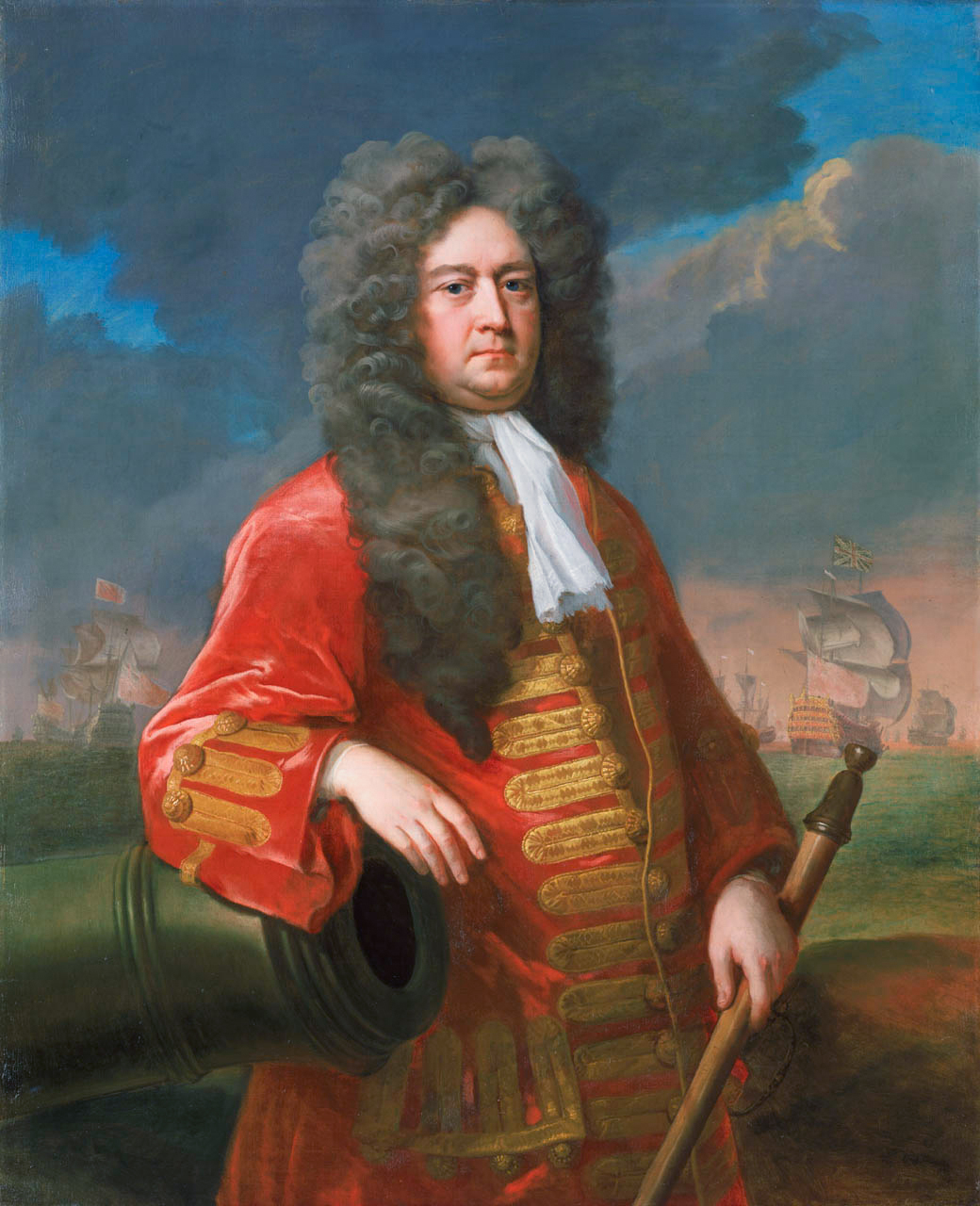
- Portrait by Michael Dahl, c. 1705
- Born: 1650; Canterbury, Kent
- Died: 24 January 1709 (aged 58–59); Canterbury, Kent
- Burial place: St Paul's Church, Canterbury
- Military career
- Allegiance: England
- Branch: Royal Navy
- Service years: 1672–1705
- Rank: Admiral of the Fleet
- Commands: HMS Holmes; HMS Nonsuch; HMS Hampshire; HMS St David; HMS Deptford; Irish Squadron; Mediterranean Fleet
- Conflicts: Third Anglo-Dutch War; Nine Years' War; Great Northern War; War of the Spanish Succession

Admiral of the Fleet Sir George Rooke (1650 – 24 January 1709) was a Royal Navy officer and politician. As a junior officer he saw action at the Battle of Solebay and again at the Battle of Schooneveld during the Third Anglo-Dutch War. As a captain, he conveyed Prince William of Orange to England and took part in the Battle of Bantry Bay during the Williamite War in Ireland.

As a flag officer, Rooke commanded a division of the Royal Navy during their defeat at the Battle of Beachy Head. He also commanded a division at the Battle of Barfleur and distinguished himself at the Battle of La Hogue. He was later defeated while escorting a convoy at the Battle of Lagos.

Rooke commanded the unsuccessful allied expedition against Cádiz but on the passage home he destroyed the Spanish treasure fleet at the Battle of Vigo Bay in the opening stages of the War of the Spanish Succession. He also commanded the allied naval forces at the capture of Gibraltar and attacked the French fleet at the Battle of Málaga.

== Early career ==
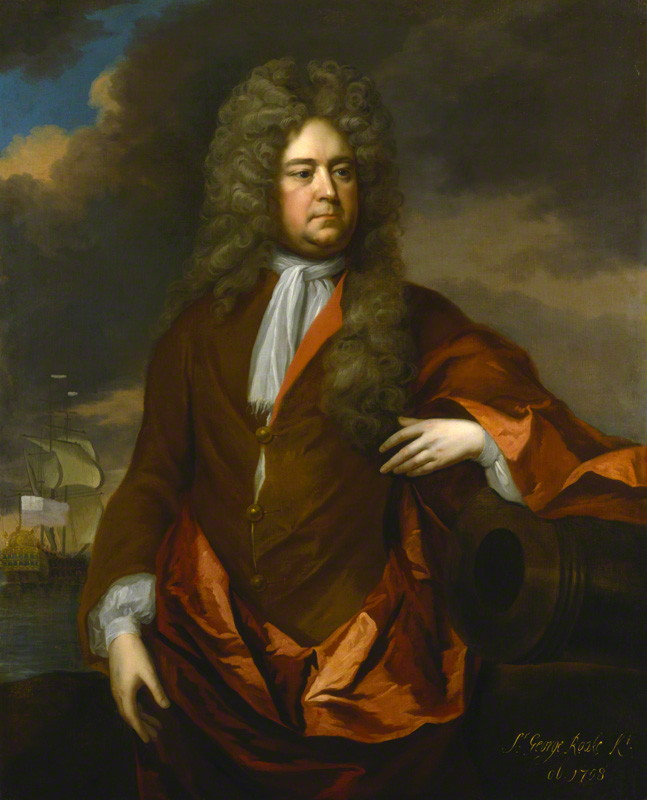
c. 1703–1708 portrait of Rooke by Michael Dahl

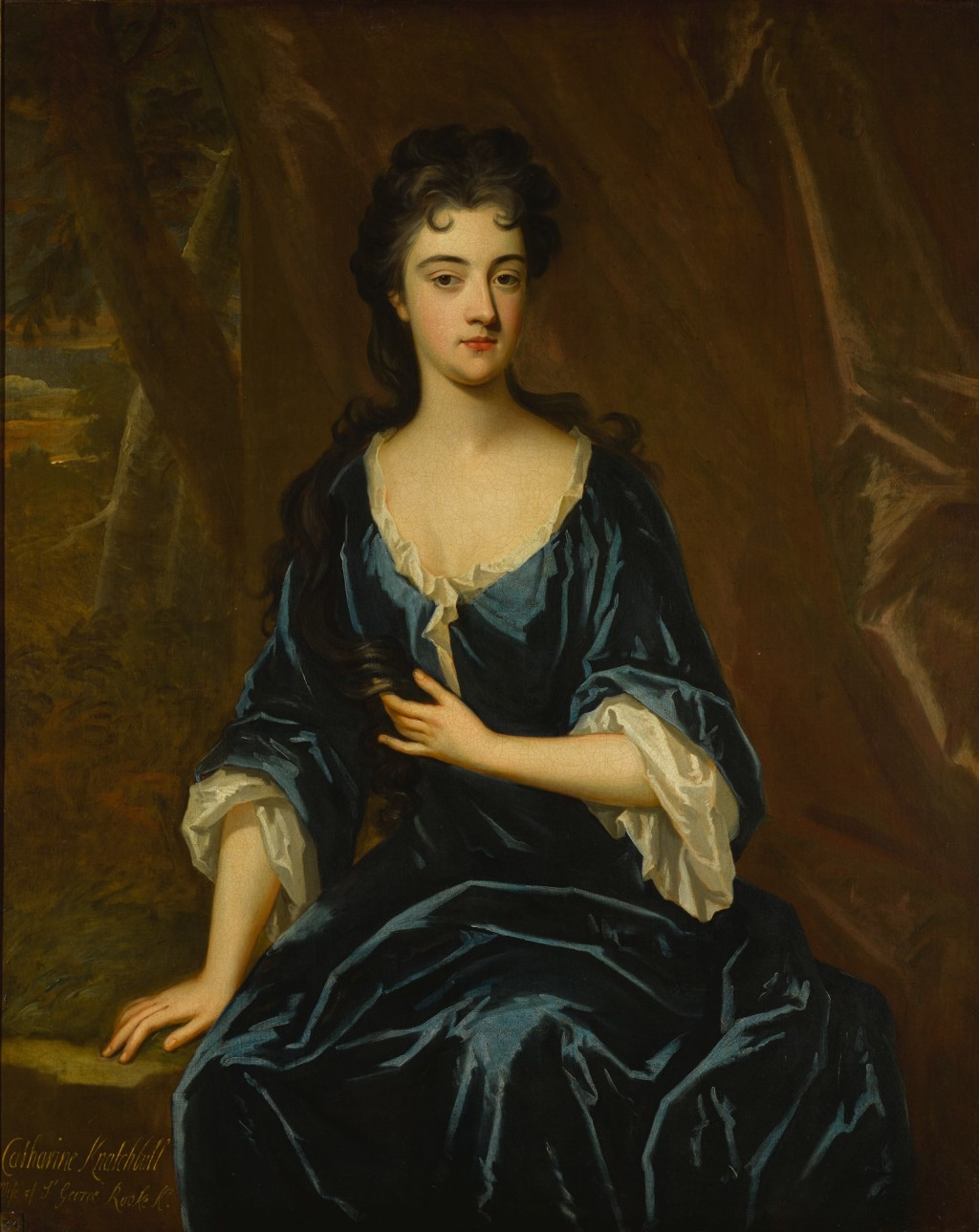
Portrait of Rooke's third wife Catherine by Sir Godfrey Kneller

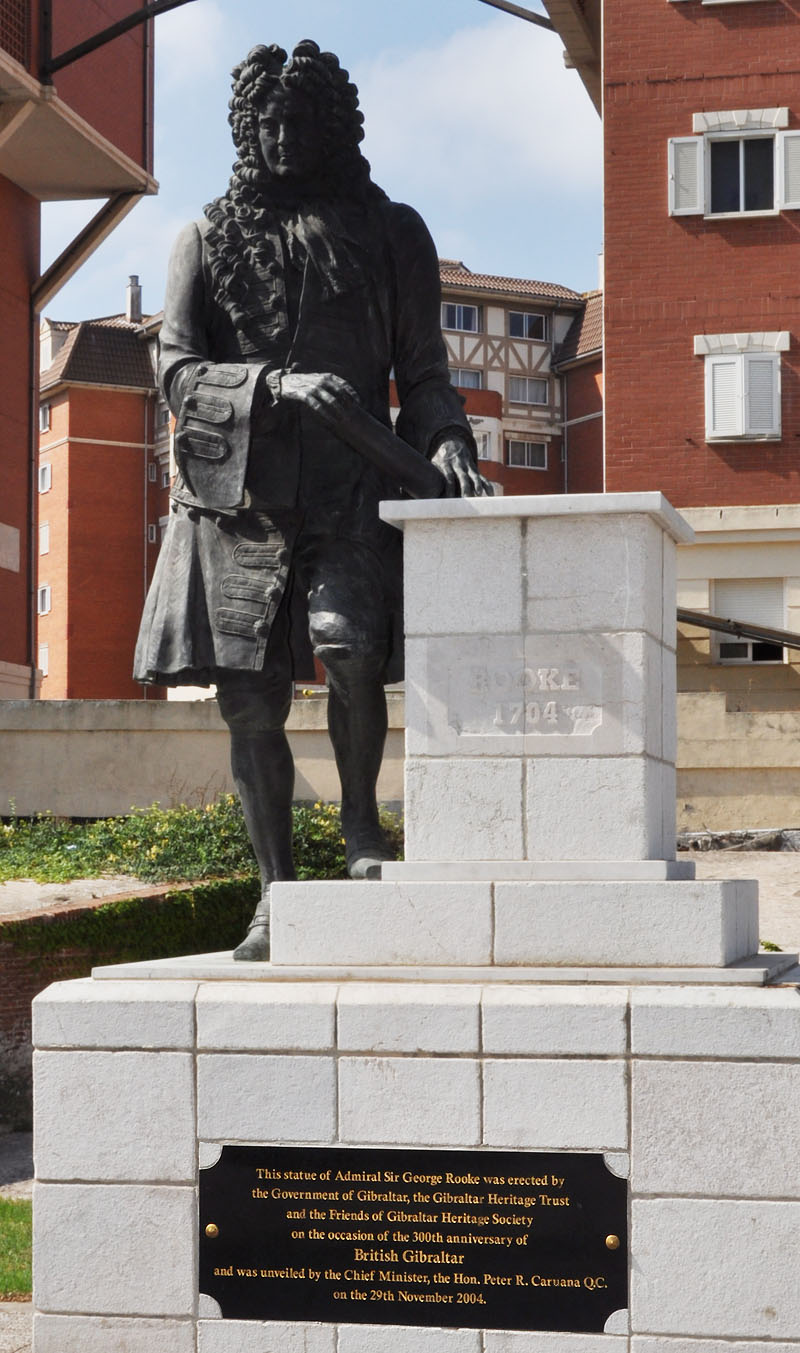
Statue of Rooke erected in Gibraltar in 2004 to celebrate 300 years of British rule

Born the son of Colonel Sir William Rooke and Jane Rooke (née Finch), Rooke joined the Royal Navy as a volunteer in 1672. Promoted to lieutenant later in the year, he was appointed to the first-rate HMS London, flagship of Vice-Admiral Sir Edward Spragge, and saw action when a combined British and French fleet was surprised and attacked by the Dutch, led by Admiral Michiel de Ruyter, at the Battle of Solebay off the Suffolk coast in May 1672 during the Third Anglo-Dutch War. He transferred to the first-rate HMS Royal Prince, flagship of the Duke of York, in 1673 and saw action again at the Battle of Schooneveld in June 1673.

Promoted to captain on 13 November 1673, Rooke was given command of the sixth-rate HMS Holmes and was deployed on convoy duties. After a period of service in the Army, Rooke transferred to the command of the fifth-rate HMS Nonsuch in April 1677 and conveyed Prince William of Orange to England in October 1677. He transferred to the fourth-rate HMS Hampshire in the Mediterranean in July 1680 to the fourth-rate HMS St David in the English Channel April 1683 and to the fourth-rate HMS Deptford in the Mediterranean in April 1688. In Deptford he saw action at the Battle of Bantry Bay in May 1689 when a French fleet tried to land troops in Southern Ireland to fight against Prince William during the Williamite War in Ireland. In August the same year he cleared Belfast Lough of French shipping, allowing Marshal Schomberg's force to land in Ulster where they successfully laid siege to Carrickfergus and advanced south to Dundalk Camp.

== Senior command ==
Promoted to rear admiral in early 1690, Rooke hoisted his flag in the second-rate HMS Duchess and commanded the rear division of the centre squadron during the French victory at the Battle of Beachy Head in July 1690 during the Nine Years' War. His tactics during the battle were subsequently severely criticised at the inquiry but he was nevertheless cleared of blame. Promoted to vice-admiral on 20 January 1692, he hoisted his flag in the second-rate HMS Neptune and served under Admiral Edward Russell commanding the vanguard division of the rear squadron at the Battle of Barfleur in May 1692. After temporarily transferring his flag to the third-rate HMS Eagle, he distinguished himself in a night attack on the French fleet at Battle of La Hogue when he succeeded in burning twelve of the enemy's ships. Knighted on 20 February 1693, he commanded the escort for Smyrna convoy, which was scattered and partly captured by the French Admiral Anne Hilarion de Tourville near Lagos, Portugal, in June 1693. He was promoted to full admiral in July 1693.

Rooke joined the Board of Admiralty led by Admiral Edward Russell in May 1694. He also became commander-in-chief of the Mediterranean Fleet in August 1695 and then returned to England in April 1696. Promoted to Admiral of the Fleet shortly afterwards, he was given command the Channel Fleet but was unable to stop the French squadron which sailed from Toulon from reaching Brest and was criticised at the subsequent inquiry. He was elected Tory Member of Parliament for Portsmouth in Autumn 1698 and played an active part as spokesman for the Admiralty presenting, for example, an estimate of the navy debt to the House in April 1699. He was advanced to Senior Naval Lord on the Admiralty Board in May 1699.

Rooke hoisted his flag in the second-rate HMS Shrewsbury in Spring 1700 and took command of an Anglo-Dutch Squadron, which while working in co-operation with a Swedish fleet under Admiral-General Hans Wachtmeister, attacked Copenhagen so facilitating the landing of King Charles XII of Sweden and his army in Denmark in August 1700 in the opening phase of the Great Northern War. When the Admiralty was reconstituted under a council headed by the Lord High Admiral (an office vested at that time in the Earl of Pembroke), Rooke was appointed a member of the council of the Lord High Admiral in January 1702. He was also appointed Vice-Admiral of England later that year.

The Allies resolved upon an expedition, led by Rooke, to capture the southern Spanish port of Cádiz, and at a stroke cut off Spain's transatlantic trade. However, on arrival in August 1702 the Allies made little or no progress in the assault on Cádiz. Fort Matagorda held out, and after several days Rooke declared that even if the fort was taken, another stronghold guarding the entrance to the Puntales (a sandy spit near the entrance to the inner harbour) would prevent the fleet from navigating the narrow passage: and so the mission was abandoned. However the English Government had become aware that a Spanish treasure fleet was sitting in Vigo Bay and instructed Rooke to intercept it in October 1702. The third-rate HMS Torbay, commanded by Thomas Hopsonn, led the assault on the boom across the bay and, once it was breached, there was not a single French or Spanish vessel that had not been either captured or destroyed at the Battle of Vigo Bay. Rooke received the thanks of Parliament in this important action in the opening stages of the War of the Spanish Succession.

Rooke safely delivered Archduke Charles of Austria (the claimant to the Spanish throne) to Windsor Castle in December 1703. Flying his flag in the second rate HMS Royal Katherine, he commanded the allied naval forces who arrived in Gibraltar in August 1704: after a bombardment by 22 ships directed by Admiral George Byng a landing party disembarked, hoisted the Union Flag and captured Gibraltar. Rooke also attacked the French fleet at the Battle of Málaga later that month.

Suffering severely from gout, he retired from the navy on account of ill-health in January 1705, stood down from the council of the Lord High Admiral in June 1705 and gave up his seat in Parliament in 1708. He died at his home, Lawrence House in Canterbury, on 24 January 1709 and was buried at St Paul's Church in Canterbury. In November 2004 Peter Caruana, Chief Minister of Gibraltar, unveiled a statue of Rooke as part of the 300th anniversary celebration of the capture of Gibraltar.

== Family ==
Rooke married his first wife, Mary Howe, around October 1684. Following her death, he married Mary Luttrell in January 1701, with whom he had one son. After Luttrell's death, he married Catherine Knatchbull in January 1706.

== Honours ==
The ship's badge of HMS Hogue, a chess rook on a field blue within a chaplet of laurel gold, was derived from his coat of arms.

== Sources ==
- Le Fevre, Peter; Harding, Richard (2000). Precursors of Nelson: British admirals of the eighteenth century. London: Chatham. ISBN 978-0811729017.
- Rodger, N.A.M. (1979). The Admiralty. Offices of State. Lavenham: T. Dalton Ltd. ISBN 0900963948.
- Rodger, N.A.M. (2006). The Command of the Ocean: A Naval History of Britain 1649–1815. Penguin Group. ISBN 0-14-102690-1.
- Trevelyan, G. M. (1948). England Under Queen Anne: Blenheim. Longmans, Green and cC.

Parliament of England
Preceded by John Gibson; Nicholas Hedger	Member of Parliament for Portsmouth; 1698–1707; With: Thomas Erle (to January 1702); John Gibson (to July 1702); Thomas Erle (to December 1702); William Gifford (to 1707)	Succeeded by Parliament of Great Britain
Parliament of Great Britain
Preceded by Parliament of England	Member of Parliament for Portsmouth; 1707–1708; With: William Gifford	Succeeded by Thomas Erle; George Churchill
Military offices
Preceded by Earl of Orford	Senior Naval Lord; 1699–1702	Succeeded by Lord High Admirals Council (Next held by Sir John Leake)
