= Sir Samuel Grimston, 3rd Baronet =

English politician (1643–1700)

Sir Samuel Grimston Bt

Member of Parliament for St Albans
- In office 1689–1699
- Preceded by: George Churchill; Thomas Docwra
- Succeeded by: George Churchill; Joshua Lomax
- In office 1679–1685
- Preceded by: Sir Thomas Blount; John Gape
- Succeeded by: George Churchill; Thomas Docwra
- In office 1668–1679
- Preceded by: Richard Jennings; Thomas Arris
- Succeeded by: Sir Thomas Blount; John Gape

Personal details
- Born: 7 January 1643
- Died: 1 October 1700 (aged 57)
- Spouses: Lady Elizabeth Finch (m. 1670; died 1672) Lady Anne Tufton (m. 1673)
- Parent(s): Sir Harbottle Grimston, 2nd Baronet; Mary Croke

Sir Samuel Grimston, 3rd Baronet (7 January 1643 – October 1700) of Gorhambury House, Hertfordshire was an English politician.

== Early life ==
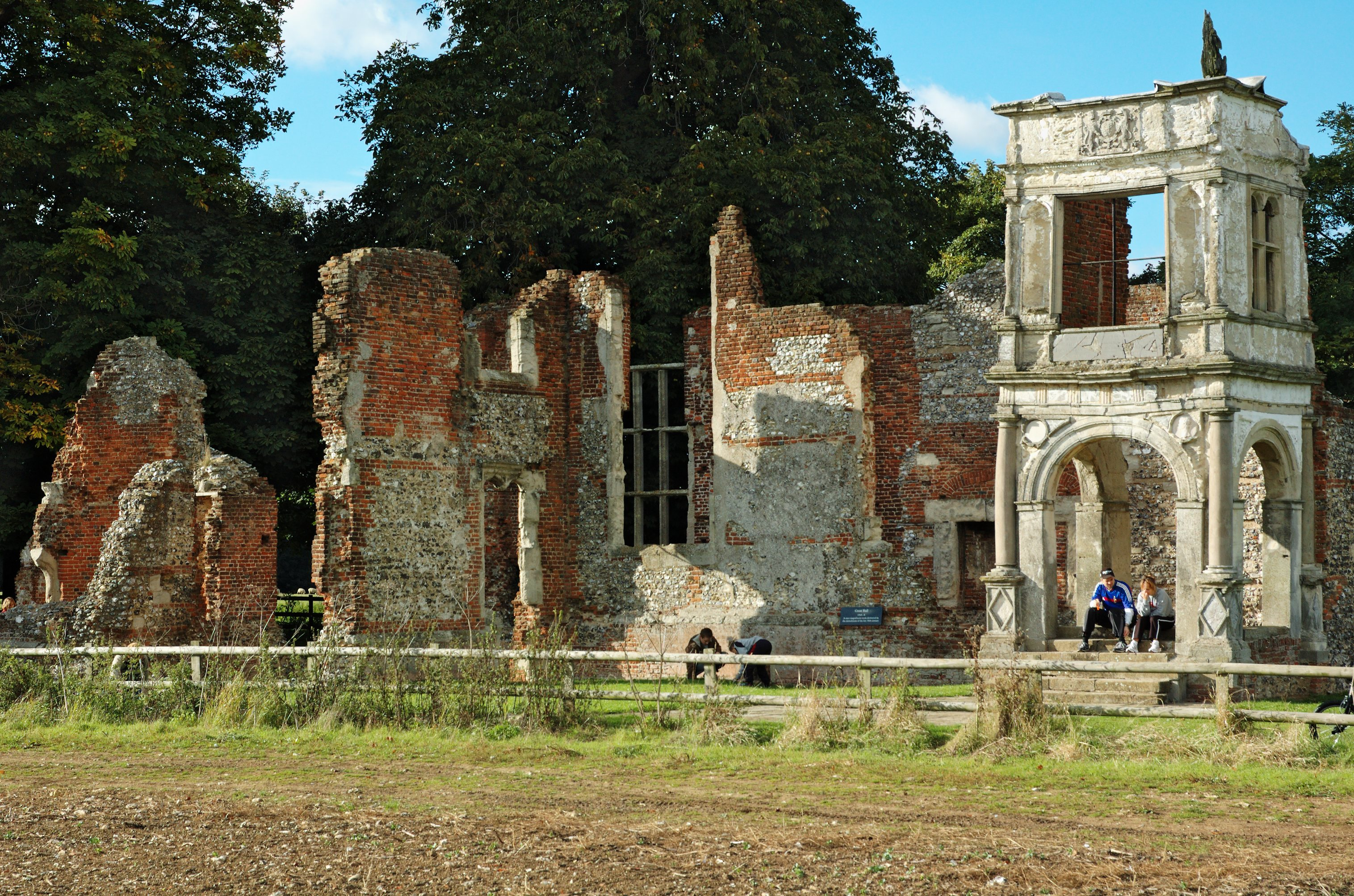
Ruins of Old Gorhambury House

He was born 7 January 1643. Grimston was the second and only one of the six sons of Sir Harbottle Grimston, 2nd Baronet, a leading Presbyterian lawyer, who survived him. His mother was Sir Harbottle's first wife, Mary Croke, daughter of Sir George Croke, a Justice of the King's Bench.

== Career ==
He was elected Member of Parliament for St Albans at a by-election in May 1668. He was not returned to the parliament of 1678, but was re-elected in 1679 and 1680. During the reign of James II he remained in private life, being, it is said, much disliked by the king, who expressly excepted him from pardon in the manifesto he issued when he contemplated landing in England (1692).

Grimston succeeded to his father's baronetcy and estates, including Gorhambury, in 1683, and was returned a member of the Convention Parliament of 22 January 1689. From that time till May 1699 he sat continuously for his old borough of St Albans.

In 1692 his sister-in-law Sarah Seymour, Duchess of Somerset died. She had left her estate of Froxfield Manor as an endowment to the almshouses she had created which were called the Duchess of Somerset's Hospital. Grimston who was one of the trustees of the Duchess's will refused to convey the prescribed lands and income to the hospital until he was ordered to do so by the Court of Chancery.

== Personal life ==
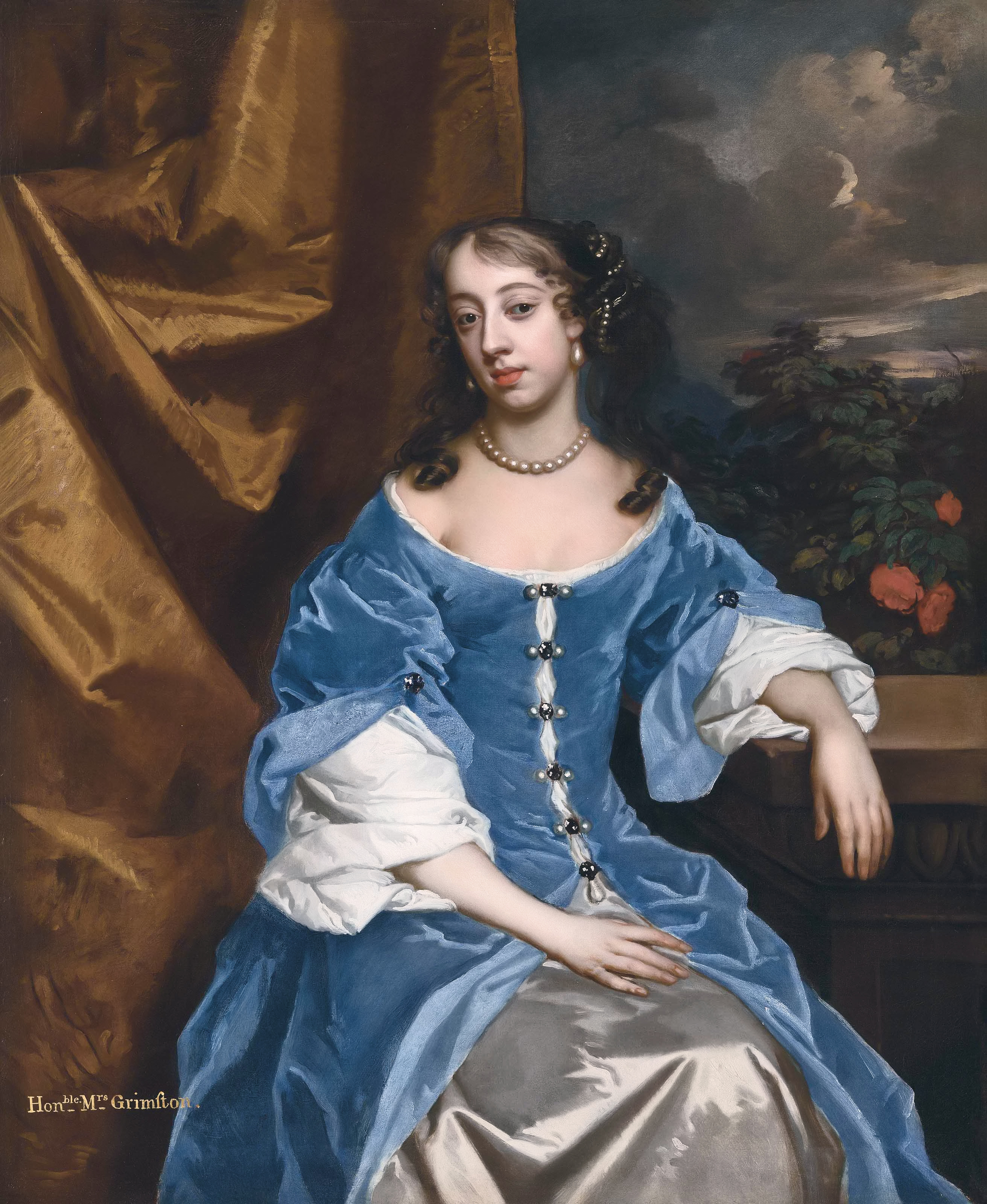
Hon. Mrs Grimston, née Finch, afterwards Lady Elizabeth Grimston (1650-1675) (Peter Lely)

He married first Lady Elizabeth Finch, the eldest daughter of Heneage Finch, 1st Earl of Nottingham, on 14 February 1670. Before her death in 1672, they were the parents of a daughter:

- Elizabeth Grimston (d. 1694), who became the first wife of William Savile, 2nd Marquess of Halifax (1665–1700) in 1687.

On 17 April 1673, Grimston married his second wife, Lady Anne Tufton, the sixth daughter of John Tufton, 2nd Earl of Thanet and his wife, Lady Margaret Sackville (daughter of Richard Sackville, 3rd Earl of Dorset and Lady Anne Clifford). By her he had a son and daughter, but both died young, and on his death, which occurred in October 1700, the Grimston baronetcy became extinct.

Grimston left the family estates, which he had increased by the purchase of the manor of Windridge from Henry Osbaston, to his great-nephew, William Luckyn Grimston (later the 1st Viscount Grimston), second son of Sir William Luckyn of Messing Hall.

=== Descendants ===
Through his daughter Lady Elizabeth, he was a grandfather of Lady Anne Savile (1691–1717), who married Charles Bruce, 4th Earl of Elgin.

== Arms ==
Coat of arms of Sir Samuel Grimston, 3rd Baronet
Escutcheon Argent on a fess Sable three mullets of six points Or pierced Gules in the dexter chief point an Ermine spot.

Parliament of England
Preceded by Thomas Arris; Richard Jennings	Member of Parliament for St Albans; 1668–1679; With: Thomas Arris	Succeeded by Sir Thomas Blount; John Gape
Preceded by Sir Thomas Blount; John Gape	Member of Parliament for St Albans; 1679–1685; With: Sir Thomas Blount	Succeeded by George Churchill; Thomas Docwra
Preceded by George Churchill; Thomas Docwra	Member of Parliament for St Albans; 1689–1699; With: George Churchill	Succeeded by George Churchill; Joshua Lomax
Baronetage of England
Preceded by Harbottle Grimston	Baronet (of Bradfield); 1685–1700	Extinct
