= George Churchill (British Army officer) =

British Army officer (d.1753)

Lieutenant-General George Churchill
- Died: 1753
- Allegiance: United Kingdom
- Branch: British Army
- Rank: Lieutenant-General
- Commands: Regiment of Foot; Coldstream Guards; 1st Regiment of Marines
- Conflicts: War of the Austrian Succession: Battle of Fontenoy

Lieutenant-General George Churchill (died 1753) was an officer of the British Army.

== Early life ==
George was the illegitimate son of Admiral George Churchill from his relationship with Mary Cooke, of whom little is known. He was thus a nephew of General Charles Churchill and the Duke of Marlborough.

== Career ==
The young Churchill joined the Army as a lieutenant on 12 January 1707. He was promoted to captain in Lord Hertford's Regiment of Foot on 24 March 1712, then transferred to the Coldstream Guards as captain and lieutenant-colonel on 28 September 1715, being further promoted to second major on 5 July 1739 and first major on 25 December 1740. He served as lieutenant-colonel of the Coldstream Guards from 1 April 1743 until appointed colonel of the 1st Regiment of Marines on 20 September 1745, a post he held until that regiment was disbanded on 11 November 1748. Besides his regimental service, Churchill was promoted brigadier-general on 5 July 1739, major-general on 31 May 1745, and lieutenant-general on 19 September 1747, and was commander of the forces in Scotland from January 1752 until his death on 19 August 1753. At the time of his death he also held the sinecure office of Lieutenant-Governor of Fort St Philip in Minorca.

== Personal life ==
George married Catherine Hobart (d. 1725), daughter of Sir Henry Hobart, MP, 4th Baronet and Elizabeth Maynard, eldest daughter of Sir Joseph Maynard. They had no children.

Military offices
| Preceded by George Keightley | Colonel of the 1st Regiment of Marines; 1745–1748 | Succeeded by Regiment disbanded |
