= Capture of the galleon San Joaquin =

1711 battle of the War of the Spanish Succession

Coordinates: 10.4114°N 75.5350°W

- Part of the War of the Spanish Succession
Date	11 August 1711
Location	Off Cartagena de Indias, Caribbean Sea
Result	British victory

Belligerents
Great Britain	Spain

Commanders and leaders
James Littleton	Miguel Augustin de Villanueva (DOW)

Strength
5 ships of the line	1 galleon 1 smaller ship

Casualties and losses
7 killed or wounded	150 killed or wounded 450 captured 1 galleon captured 1 smaller ship captured

The capture of the galleon San Joaquin (also known as the Battle of Cartagena) was a naval engagement that took place off the coast near Cartagena (present day Colombia). It involved five British ships of the line against the Spanish galleon San Joaquin and a smaller ship. After an action lasting barely an hour San Joaquin surrendered. The galleon had fought in the previous encounter during Wager's Action nearly three years earlier but had just barely escaped capture.

== Background ==
In late May 1711, a French squadron under Admiral Jean-Baptiste du Casse arrived at Cartagena de Indias. On 3 August 1711, they sailed from Cartagena escorting the Spanish treasure fleet which was to return to Spain. The units of escort composed of the following: the 64-gun galleon San Joaquin under Admiral Miguel Augustin de Villanueva, the 70-gun Saint-Michel under du Casse, the 60-gun Hercule under Captain Proglie and the 44-gun frigate Griffon under Captain Turroble.

Meanwhile, British Commodore James Littleton arrived with a number of ships which had sailed from Port Royal in Jamaica on 26 July: a fleet which consisted of HMS Salisbury of 50 guns under Captain Francis Hosier and Littleton's flagship, Salisbury Prize of 50 guns under Captain Sir Robert Harland, HMS Jersey of 60 guns under Captain Edward Vernon, HMS Newcastle of 50 guns under Captain Sampson Bourne, HMS Weymouth 50 guns, under Captain Richard Lestock, HMS Anglesea 50 under Captain Thomas Legge, frigate Fowey of 40 guns under Captain Robert Chadwick.

== Capture ==
Du Casse had left the frigate Gallarde in Cartagena for its defense and so on the day of leaving, the fleet were soon spotted by Littleton's fleet but a storm prevented any action, and both fleets dispersed. Most of the fleet, including du Casse, returned to Cartagena without giving any advice to Admiral Villanueva. On 7 August the galleon San Joaquin was separated along with a smaller vessel and a squadron was sighted. Villaneuva thought the vessels were that of du Casse, but it was the English squadron of Littleton.

When Villanueva realized his error, it was too late to flee, and he decided to take on Littleton's squadron. The ensuing engagement lasted less than 20 minutes. San Joaquin was dismasted and suffered many casualties. Villaneuva, surrounded by the overwhelming British squadron, was mortally wounded when hit by a musket shot and soon struck his flag. Littleton, went on board from Salisbury and took the surrender. Vernon in Jersey captured the smaller vessel, which was attempting to escape.

== Aftermath ==
The galleon's prize money was shared amongst the captains and the British sailed back to Port Royal. By order of King Philip V, the treasure was transferred to the French ships. Three days after the battle, du Casse, knowing that San Joaquin was lost, left Cartagena and sent his forces first towards Martinique, then to Pensacola, and finally to Spain where they reached safely.
