= Lord High Admirals Council =

Royal Navy's senior advisory council.

- Flag of the Lord High Admiral

Agency overview
- Formed: 1702, 1827
- Preceding agency: Board of Admiralty
- Dissolved: 1706, 1828
- Superseding agency: Board of Admiralty
- Jurisdiction: Government of the United Kingdom
- Headquarters: Admiralty Building Whitehall Westminster, London
- Agency executive: Lord High Admiral
- Parent department: Admiralty

The Lord High Admirals Council was a series of councils appointed to advise and assist the Lord High Admiral of England and then later of the United Kingdom of Great Britain and Ireland in the direction of Naval Affairs also known as Council of the Lord High Admiral when the Board of Admiralty was not in commission the first series took place between 1702-1708 and second and final series of councils took place from 1827-1828.

== History ==
For the periods the Board of Admiralty was not in commission, a special council of advisers known as the Lord High Admirals Council was established on the advice of the government of the day to which the Lord High Admiral had to accept the advisers recommended by the government.

In 1702, Prince George was authorised to appoint a Lord Admirals Council – there were originally three naval members and one civil member who were usually a member of parliament. Between 1703 and the spring of 1704, the permitted number of members of the council was raised to six. After spring 1704 until 1708, the upper limit of members of the council was increased to seven. In May 1827, the Duke of Clarence was authorised to appoint a council that consisted of no more than four members to hold office during his tenure; by July 1827, the right of the Lord High Admiral to appoint council members was passed over to the Monarch. The Duke of Clarence's councils usually consisted of two naval members and two civil members, in all twelve councils would convene during the two periods.

== Councils of the lord high admiral ==
=== Councils of Prince George ===
- Lord High Admiral of England: Prince George of Denmark

Senior Members of Lords Admiral Council (*), Naval Member (N) and Civil Member (C)

Council of 22 May 1702

- Admiral of the Fleet Sir George Rooke, (* N).
- Vice-Admiral, Sir David Mitchell, (N).
- Admiral of the Blue, George Churchill (N).
- Sir Richard Hill, (C)
- George Clarke, and Josiah Burchett (joint Secretaries to the Admiralty)

Council of 29 March 1703

- Admiral of the Fleet, Sir George Rooke, (* N).
- Vice-Admiral, Sir David Mitchell, (N).
- Admiral of the Blue, George Churchill]] (N).
- James Brydges, (C)
- Sir Richard Hill, (C)
- George Clarke, and Josiah Burchett (joint Secretaries to the Admiralty)

Council of 30 April 1704

- Admiral of the Fleet, Sir George Rooke, (* N).
- Vice-Admiral, Sir David Mitchell, (N).
- Admiral of the Blue, George Churchill (N).
- James Brydges, (C)
- Sir Richard Hill, (C)
- Henry Paget,(C)
- George Clarke, and Josiah Burchett (joint Secretaries to the Admiralty)

Council of 26 December 1704

- Admiral of the Fleet, Sir George Rooke, (* N).
- Vice-Admiral, Sir David Mitchell, (N).
- Admiral of the Blue, George Churchill (N).
- James Brydges, (C)
- Sir Richard Hill, (C)
- Henry Paget, (C)
- Admiral, Cloudesley Shovell, (N).
- George Clarke, and Josiah Burchett (joint Secretaries to the Admiralty)

Council of 11 June 1705

- Admiral, Sir David Mitchell, (* N).
- Admiral of the Blue, George Churchill (N).
- Richard Hill, (C).
- Henry Paget, (C).
- Admiral, Cloudesley Shovell, (N).
- Robert Walpole.
- George Clarke, and Josiah Burchett (joint Secretaries to the Admiralty)

Council of 8 February 1706

- Admiral, Sir Sir David Mitchell, (* N).
- Admiral of the Blue, George Churchill (N).
- Sir Richard Hill, (C).
- Henry Paget, (C)
- Admiral, Cloudesley Shovell, (N).
- Robert Walpole, (C).
- Vice-Admiral, Sir Stafford Fairborne, (N)
- Josiah Burchett (Secretary to the Admiralty)

Notes: 28 June 1707: Prince George, Lord High Admiral (reappointed as Lord High Admiral of Great Britain following the Union with Scotland)

Council of 28 June 1707

- Admiral, Sir Sir David Mitchell, (* N).
- Admiral of the Blue, George Churchill, (N)
- Sir Richard Hill, (C).
- Henry Paget, (C).
- Admiral, Sir Cloudesley Shovell, (N)
- Robert Walpole, (C)
- Vice-Admiral, Sir Stafford Fairborne, (N)
- Josiah Burchett (Secretary to the Admiralty)

Council of 19 April 1708

- David Wemyss, 4th Earl of Wemyss, (*)
- Admiral of the Blue, George Churchill (N)
- Sir Richard Hill, (C)
- Henry Paget, (C)
- Admiral, Sir Stafford Fairborne, (N)
- Admiral, Sir John Leake, (N)
- Josiah Burchett (Secretary to the Admiralty)

Council of 20 June 1708

- David Wemyss, 4th Earl of Wemyss, (*)
- Admiral of the Blue, George Churchill, (N)
- Sir Richard Hill, (C).
- Henry Paget, (C)
- Admiral of the Fleet, Sir John Leake, (N)
- Rear-Admiral of the Blue, Sir James Wishart, (N)
- Rear-Admiral, Robert Fairfax, (N)
- Josiah Burchett (Secretary to the Admiralty)

=== Councils of the Duke of Clarence ===
Senior Members of Lords Admiral Council

Lord High Admiral	Council	Naval Member		Civil Member	
Admiral of the Fleet; Prince William, Duke of Clarence and St Andrews	Council of 2 May 1827	Vice-Admiral Sir William Johnstone Hope	Vice-Admiral Sir George Cockburn	Lord William Douglas	John Denison
Admiral of the Fleet; Prince William, Duke of Clarence and St Andrews	Council of 4 February 1828	Vice-Admiral Sir William Johnstone Hope	Vice-Admiral Sir George Cockburn	Sir George Clerk	George Pratt, Earl of Brecknock
Admiral of the Fleet; Prince William, Duke of Clarence and St Andrews	Council of 12 March 1828	Vice-Admiral Sir George Cockburn	Rear-Admiral Sir Edward Owen	Sir George Clerk	George Pratt, Earl of Brecknock

== Bibliography ==
- Clarendon, Edward Hyde Earl of (1798). The Life of Edward Earl of Clarendon, Lord High Chancellor of England, and Chancellor of the University of Oxford: Containing, I. An Account of the Chancellor's Life from His Birth to the Restoration in 1660. II. A Continuation of the Same, and of His History of the Grand Rebellion, from the Restoration to His Banishment in 1667. J.J. Tourneisen.
- Morriss, Roger (1997). Cockburn and the British Navy in Transition: Admiral Sir George Cockburn, 1772-1853. Univ of South Carolina Press. ISBN 9781570032530.
- Sainty J. C. ed. (1775) 'Members of the Council of the Lord High Admiral 1702-8; 1827-8', in Office-Holders in Modern Britain: Volume 4, Admiralty Officials 1660-1870, ed. https://www.british-history.ac.uk/office-holders/vol4.
- Rodger, N.A.M. (1979). The Admiralty. Offices of State. Lavenham: T. Dalton. ISBN 0900963948.
