= Battle of Cabrita Point =

1705 battle of the War of the Spanish Succession

- Part of the War of the Spanish Succession
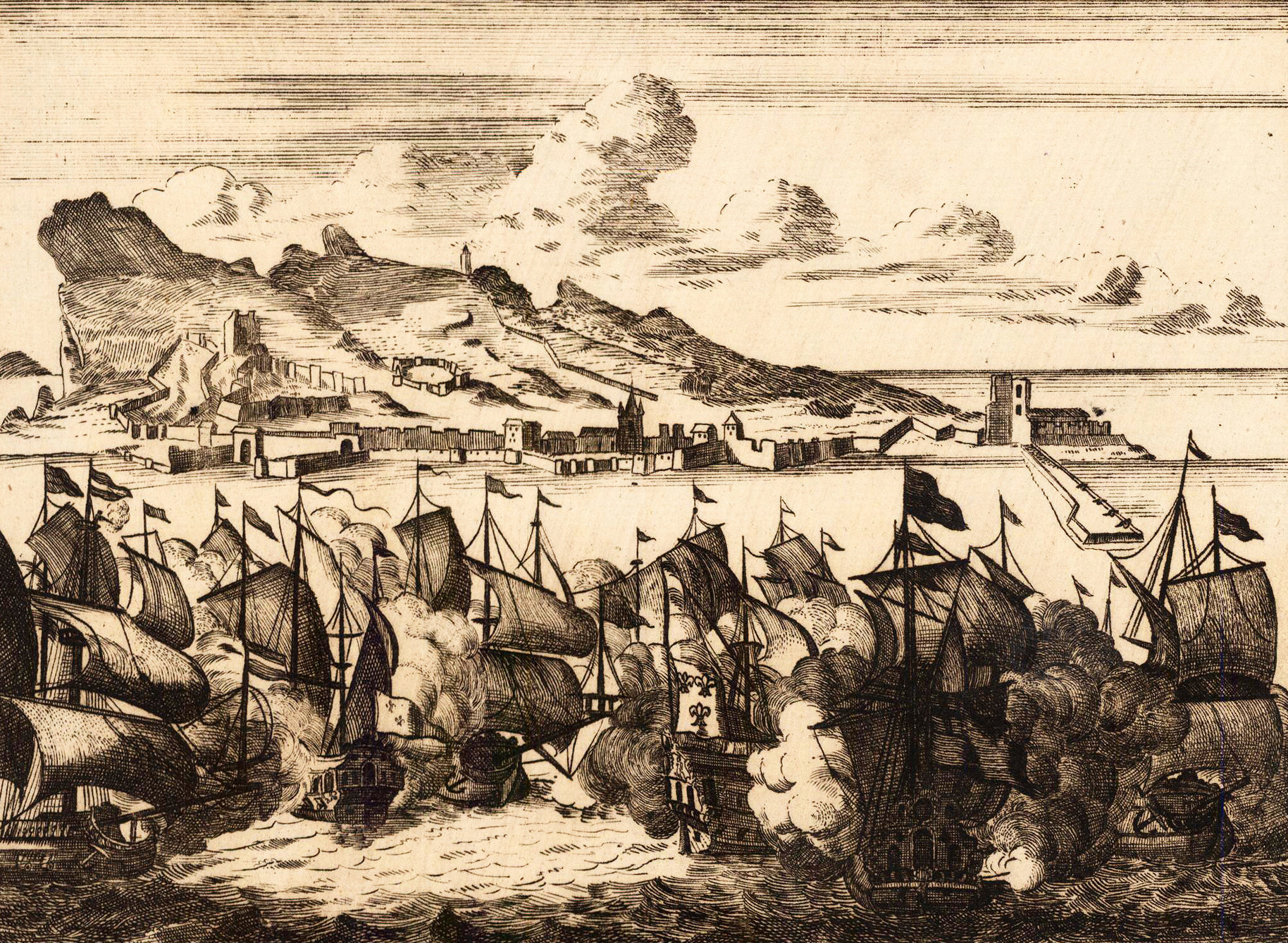
- 1715 lithograph of the battle
Date	21 March 1705
Location	Off Marbella, Atlantic Ocean
Result	Grand Alliance victory

Belligerents
England; Portugal; Dutch Republic	France; Spain

Commanders and leaders
John Leake	Bernard Desjean

Strength
35 ships of the line	18 ships of the line

Casualties and losses
Unknown killed or wounded	Unknown killed or wounded 3 ships of the line captured 2 ships of the line destroyed

The Battle of Cabrita Point, also known Battle of Marbella, was a naval battle that took place while a combined Spanish-French force besieged Gibraltar on 10 March 1705 (21 March 1705 in the New Calendar) during the War of Spanish Succession. The battle ended in an allied victory (English, Portuguese and Dutch) which effectively ended the Franco-Spanish siege of Gibraltar.

== Background ==
Anglo-Dutch forces had conquered Gibraltar on behalf of the Archduke Charles of Habsburg on 1 August 1704. The Spanish besieged the city by land, and in that year, the French had made a first failed attempt to attack from the sea in the Battle of Málaga.

In January 1705, Philip V of Spain was determined to reconquer the city and had Villadarias replaced by Marshal de Tessé. Tessé realized that Gibraltar would never be retaken as long as the allies could access it from the sea. He therefore ordered Admiral Pointis to block up the place by sea with his squadron of 18 ships of the line. Some of these ships were Spanish under José Fernández de Santillán. Gibraltar was not a permanent harbour yet for the English fleet, which was anchored in Lisbon at the time.

The commander of Gibraltar, Prince George of Hesse-Darmstadt, despatched an express to Lisbon, desiring Sir John Leake to sail to his assistance. This admiral set sail immediately with five sail of the line and a body of troops. By the morning of 10 March, he had a squadron of 23 English, eight Portuguese ships of various sizes, and four Dutch.

== Battle ==
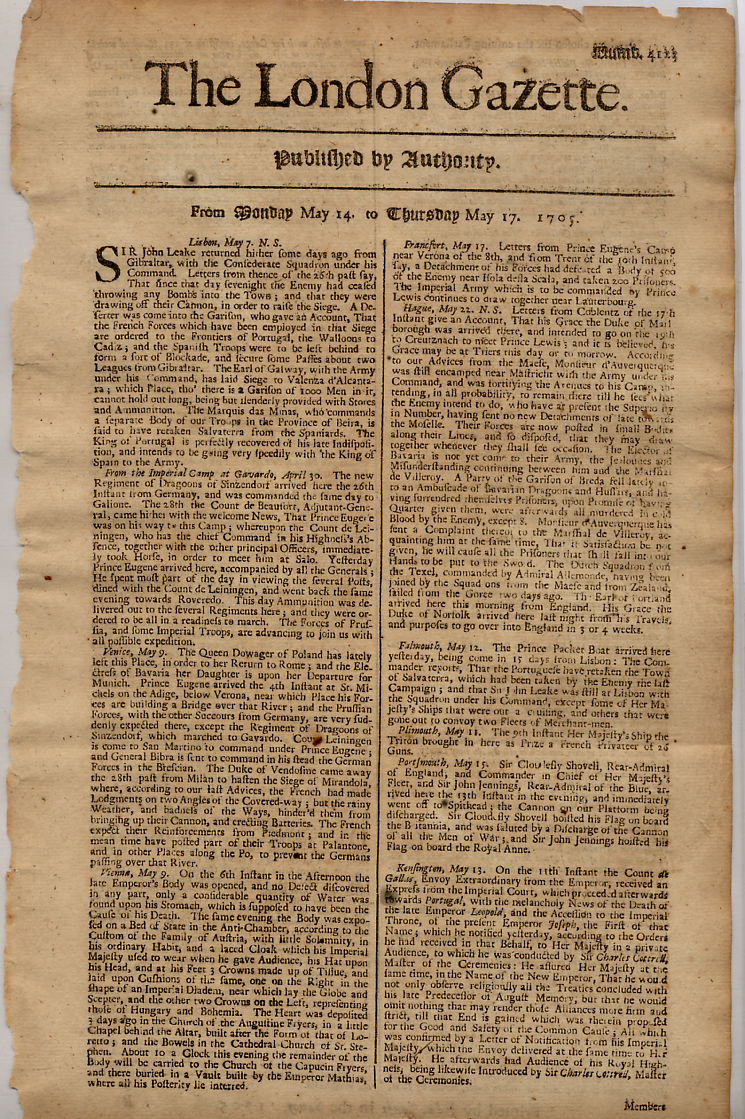
14–17 May 1705 edition of the London Gazette detailing Leake's return to England after the battle

Leake's fleet reached the Strait late on the 9th, and laid to during the night. The next morning at about 5.30 a.m., they were within two miles of Cabrita Point, when they saw five sail coming out of the Bay. These proved to be the French ships Magnanime (74), Lys (86), Ardent (66), Arrogant (60), and Marquis (66). They made at first towards the Barbary Coast, but, finding that they were being gained upon, stood for the Spanish coast. At 9 a.m. Sir Thomas Dilkes in HMS Revenge, with the Newcastle, Antelope and a Dutch man-of-war, got within gunshot of Arrogant, which, after a slight resistance, struck. Before 1 p.m. two Dutch ships took Ardent and Marquis; Magnanime and Lys were driven ashore to the westward of Marbella. Magnanime, in which De Pointis had his flag, ran ashore with so much force that all her masts went by the board. The French subsequently burned Magnanime and Lys.

The rest of the French squadron had been blown from their anchorage by a gale and had taken shelter in the bay of Málaga. They now slipped their cables and made their way to Toulon.

== Aftermath ==
The Marshal de Tessé, in consequence of this disaster, turned the siege of Gibraltar into a blockade, and withdrew the greater part of his forces on 31 March. Pointis retired from active service after this battle. Leake had not only scored a remarkable victory, but had saved Gibraltar from attack and had enhanced his already high reputation.
