= HMS Holmes =

HMS Holmes has been the name of more than one ship of the British Royal Navy, and may refer to:

- HMS Holmes, a sixth rate frigate commanded by George Rooke from November 1673.
- HMS Tobago (K585), a frigate in commission from 1944 to 1945 briefly named Holmes while under construction in 1943
- HMS Holmes (K581), a frigate in commission from 1944 to 1945
