= Cork City (Parliament of Ireland constituency) =

Pre-1801 Irish constituency

- Former borough constituency for the Irish House of Commons
- County: County Cork
- Borough: Cork

1264–1801
- Seats: 2
- Replaced by: Cork City (UKHC)

Cork City (also known as Cork Borough) was a constituency represented in the Irish House of Commons until its abolition on 1 January 1801.

== Boundaries and boundary changes ==
This constituency was the parliamentary borough of Cork in County Cork. It comprised the whole of the County of the City of Cork. Cork had the status of a county of itself, although it remained connected with County Cork for certain purposes.

A Topographical Directory of Ireland, published in 1837, describes the area covered. This seems to be the same area used, for the Parliament of Ireland constituency, in previous centuries.

The county of the city comprises a populous rural district of great beauty and fertility, watered by several small rivulets and intersected by the river Lee and its noble estuary: it is bounded on the north by the barony of Fermoy, on the east by that of Barrymore, on the south by Kerricurrihy, and on the west by Muskerry: it comprehends the parishes of St. Finbarr, Christ-Church or the Holy Trinity, St. Peter, St. Mary Shandon, St. Anne Shandon, St. Paul and St. Nicholas, all, except part of St. Finbarr's, within the city and suburbs, and those of Curricuppane, Carrigrohanemore, Kilcully, and Rathcoony, together with parts of the parishes of Killanully or Killingly, Carrigaline, Dunbullogue or Carrignavar, Ballinaboy, Inniskenny, Kilnaglory, White-church, and Templemichael, without those limits; and contains, according to the Ordnance survey, an area of 44,463 statute acres, of which, 2396 are occupied by the city and suburbs.

The Directory also has a passage on the representative history, which includes some information that applies to the pre-1801 constituency.

The right of election was vested in the freemen of the city, and in the 40s. freeholders and £50 leaseholders of the county of the city, of whom the freemen, in 1831, amounted in number to 2331, and the freeholders to 1545, making a total of 3876; but by the act of the 2nd of Wm. IV., cap. 88 (under which the city, from its distinguished importance, retains its privilege of returning two representatives to the Imperial parliament, and the limits of the franchise, comprising the entire county of the city, remain unaltered), the non-resident freemen, except within seven miles, have been disfranchised, and the privilege of voting at elections has been extended to the £10 householders, and the £20 and £10 leaseholders for the respective terms of 14 and 20 years. The number of voters registered up to Jan. 2nd, 1836, amounted to 4791, of whom 1065 were freemen; 2727 £10 householders; 105 £50, 152 £20, and 608 forty-shilling freeholders; 3 £50, 7 £20, and 2 £10 rent-chargers; and 1 £50, 26 £20, and 95 £10 leaseholders: the sheriffs are the returning officers.

Thus, before the Union, the electorate comprised the freemen of the city (including non-residents), and the Forty Shilling Freeholders of the county of the city. It returned two members to the Parliament of Ireland to 1800.

== History ==
In the Patriot Parliament of 1689 summoned by James II, Cork City was represented with two members. Following the Acts of Union 1800 the borough retained two parliamentary seats in the United Kingdom House of Commons.

== Members of Parliament, 1264–1801 ==
- 1376: William Dalton and John Droupe were elected to come to England to consult with the king and council about the government of Ireland and about an aid for the king.

Election	First MP		Second MP
1420	Geoffry Galvy		John Mithe
1559	John Meade		Stephen Coppinger
1585	John Meade		Thomas Sarsfield
1613	Edmund Terry		David Terry
1634	Dominick Coppinger		Sir William Sarsfield
1639	Sir Andrew Barrett		Dominick Roche
1661	Sir Peter Courthorpe		Sir Richard Kyrle
1689	Sir James Fitz Edmond Cotter		John Galway
1692	Alan Brodrick	Whig	Robert Rogers
1703	Alan Brodrick	Whig	Thomas Erle
1710	Edward Hoare		Thomas Erle
1713	Edward Hoare		St John Brodrick
1715	Edward Hoare		Edmond Knapp
1727	Hugh Dickson		Edward Webber
1731	Hugh Dickson		Jonas Morris
1735	Hugh Dickson		Emanuel Pigott
1739	Matthew Deane (Note: Succeeded as 4th Baronet in 1747)		Emanuel Pigott
1751	Thomas Newenham		Emanuel Pigott
1761	John Hely-Hutchinson	Administration	Sir John Freke, 3rd Bt
1764	John Hely-Hutchinson	Administration	William Brabazon Ponsonby
1776	John Hely-Hutchinson	Administration	Richard Longfield (Note: Declared not duly elected in 1783)
1783	John Hely-Hutchinson	Administration	Augustus Louis Carre Warren
1790	Hon. John Hely-Hutchinson		Richard Longfield
1796	Hon. John Hely-Hutchinson		William Hare
1797	Hon. John Hely-Hutchinson		Mountifort Longfield
1801	Succeeded by the Westminster constituency Cork City		

== Bibliography ==
- O'Hart, John (2007). The Irish and Anglo-Irish Landed Gentry: When Cromwell came to Ireland. Vol. II. Heritage Books. ISBN 0-7884-1927-7.
- Johnston-Liik, E. M. (2002). History of the Irish Parliament, 1692–1800., Publisher: Ulster Historical Foundation (28 February 2002), ISBN 1-903688-09-4
- Tim Cadogan and Jeremiah Falvey, A Biographical Dictionary of Cork, 2006, Four Courts Press ISBN 1-84682-030-8
- T. W. Moody, F. X. Martin, F. J. Byrne, A New History of Ireland 1534–1691, Oxford University Press, 1978
- Leigh Rayment's historical List of Members of the Irish House of Commons. Cites: Johnston-Liik, Edith Mary (2002). The History of the Irish Parliament 1692-1800 (6 volumes). Ulster Historical Foundation.
- Clarke, Maude V. (1932–34). "William of Windsor in Ireland, 1369-1376". Proceedings of the Royal Irish Academy: Archaeology, Culture, History, Literature. 41: 55–130. JSTOR 25515963.
- Richardson, Henry Gerald; Sayles, George Osborne (1947). Parliaments And Councils Of Mediaeval Ireland (PDF). Vol. 1. Dublin: Stationery Office. p. xxx (38/308).
