= Robert Rogers (Irish politician) =

Robert Rogers (after 1650 – 1717) was an Irish politician. He sat in the House of Commons of Ireland as a Member of Parliament (MP) for Cork City from 1692 to 1699.

Parliament of Ireland
Preceded by Sir James Fitz Edmond Cotter; John Galway	Member of Parliament for Cork City; 1692–1703; With: Alan Brodrick	Succeeded by Thomas Erle; Alan Brodrick
