= John Leake =

British Royal Navy officer and politician (1656–1720)

Admiral of the Fleet Sir John Leake
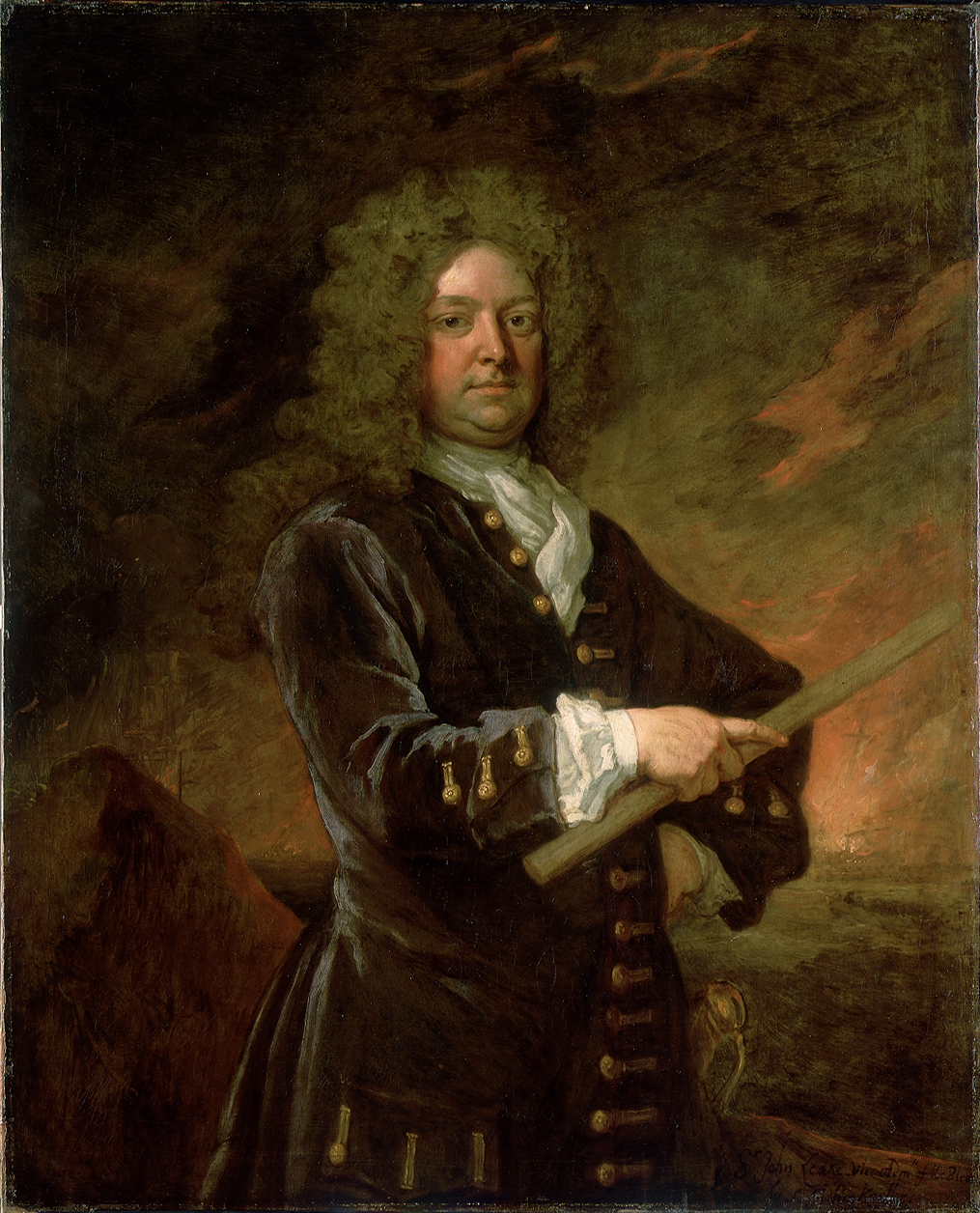
- Portrait by Godfrey Kneller, 1705–1712
- Born: 4 July 1656; Rotherhithe, London
- Died: 21 August 1720 (aged 64); Greenwich, London
- Burial place: St Dunstan's, Stepney, London
- Military career
- Allegiance: England; Great Britain
- Branch: Royal Navy
- Service years: 1673–1714
- Rank: Admiral of the Fleet
- Commands: HMS Firedrake; HMS Dartmouth; HMS Oxford; HMS Eagle; HMS Plymouth; HMS Ossory; HMS Kent; HMS Berwick; HMS Britannia; HMS Association; Mediterranean Fleet
- Conflicts: Third Anglo-Dutch War; Battle of Texel; Nine Years' War; Battles of Barfleur and La Hougue; Williamite War in Ireland; War of the Spanish Succession; Capture of Gibraltar; Battle of Málaga (1704); Battle of Cabrita Point
- Other work: MP for Rochester

Admiral of the Fleet Sir John Leake (4 July 1656 – 21 August 1720) was a British Royal Navy officer and politician who represented Rochester in the House of Commons of Great Britain from 1708 to 1715. He served in the Third Anglo-Dutch War as a junior officer, participating in the Battle of Texel. During the Williamite War in Ireland, Leake distinguished himself by leading a convoy which broke the barricading boom at Culmore Fort and lifted the siege of Derry. As a captain he fought in the Battles of Barfleur and La Hougue of the Nine Years' War.

In 1702 Leake was appointed as Commander-in-Chief, Newfoundland. Promoted to flag officer in 1704, he served as second-in-command to Admiral George Rooke at the capture of Gibraltar and commanded the Anglo-Dutch vanguard at the Battle of Málaga during the War of the Spanish Succession. In 1705, he led a combined English, Dutch and Portuguese fleet to victory over a French fleet under Baron de Pointis at the Battle of Cabrita Point.

Leake served under Sir Cloudesley Shovell and the Earl of Peterborough at the siege of Barcelona and was present at the capitulation of the city in 1706. A second siege took place between when a Franco-Spanish army led by Philip V of Spain laid siege to Barcelona in an attempt to recapture it. The Franco-Spanish army abandoned the siege when Leake arrived. Leake later captured Sardinia and landed the Earl of Stanhope with forces that took the well-fortified harbour of Port Mahon on Minorca. Leake also served First Lord of the Admiralty from 1710 to 1712.

== Early career ==
Born the son of Richard Leake, a master gunner, and Elizabeth Leake, Leake joined the Royal Navy in early 1673. He was assigned to the first-rate HMS Royal Prince, flagship of Admiral Sir Edward Spragge, and saw action at the Battle of Texel in August 1673 during the Third Anglo-Dutch War. He left the Royal Navy when the War ended in 1674 and served in merchant vessels but rejoined in 1676 and became master gunner in the second-rate HMS Neptune in 1683. Promoted to commander on 24 September 1688, he was given command of the bomb vessel HMS Firedrake and saw action under Battle of Bantry Bay in May 1689 during the Nine Years' War.

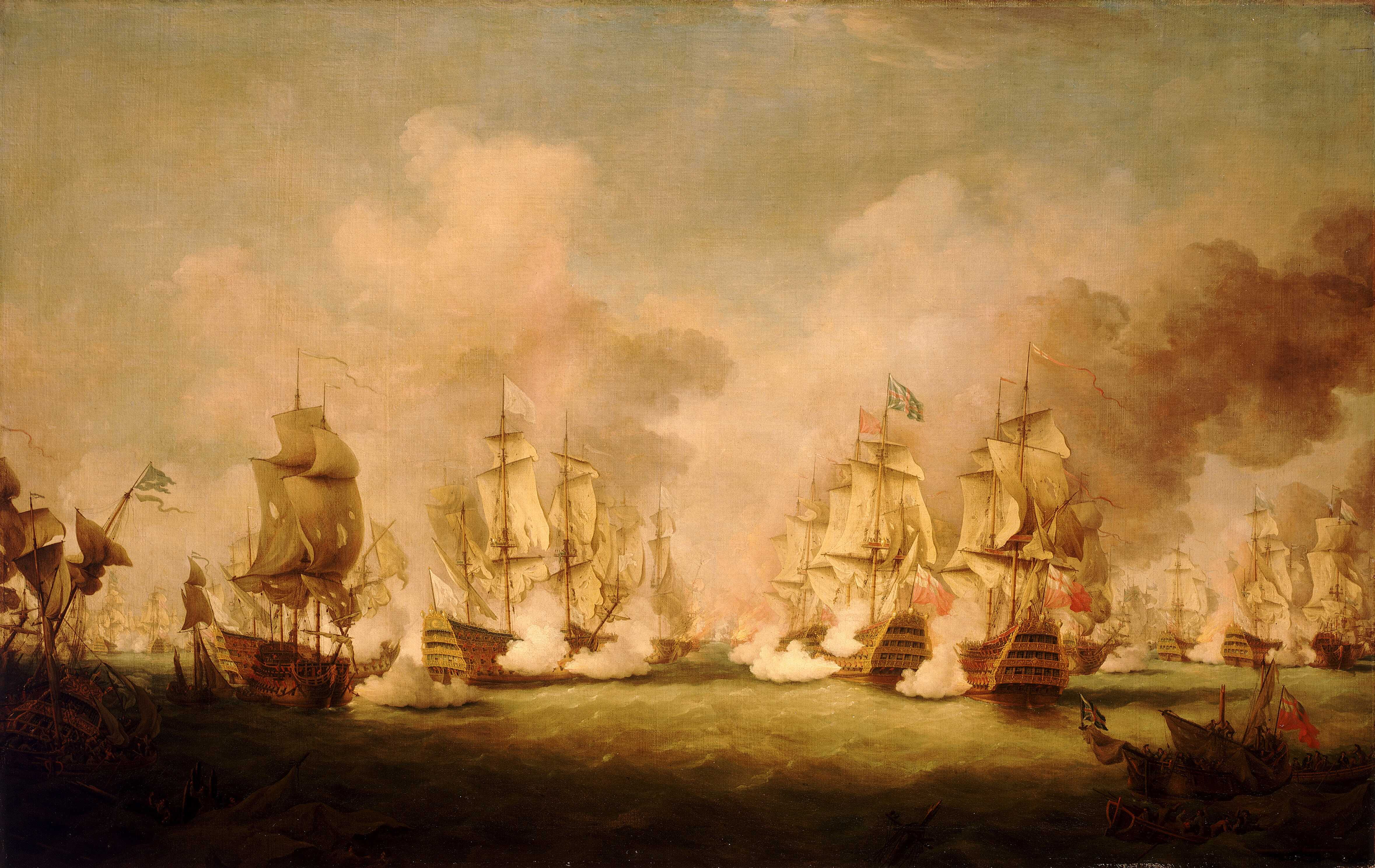
The action at Barfleur, where Leake commanded the third-rate HMS Eagle in some of the heaviest fighting (70 of his men were killed.)

Promoted to captain on 3 May 1689, Leake was given command of the fifth-rate HMS Dartmouth; he distinguished himself when he led the convoy that broke the barricading boom at Culmore Fort thereby lifting the siege of Derry in July 1689 during the Williamite War in Ireland. He transferred to the command of the fourth-rate HMS Oxford in the Mediterranean Fleet in October 1689 and to the command of the third-rate HMS Eagle in May 1690 and saw action in some of the heaviest fighting (70 of his men were killed) at the action at Barfleur in May 1692. Leake also commanded HMS Eagle, by then flagship of Vice-Admiral George Rooke, in a successful attack on the French ships at the Battle of La Hougue later that month. He transferred to the command of the third-rate HMS Plymouth on convoy protection duties in December 1692 and to the command of the second-rate HMS Ossory in the Mediterranean Fleet in July 1693.

Leake was given command of the third-rate HMS Kent on a mission to transport troops to Ireland in May 1699 and then transferred to the command of the third-rate HMS Berwick in January 1701. He took command of the first-rate HMS Britannia, flagship of the Earl of Pembroke, on an expedition to Cádiz in January 1702, and then transferred to the command of the second-rate HMS Association in June 1702.

Promoted to commodore on 24 June 1702, Leake became Commander-in-Chief, Newfoundland, with his broad pennant in the fourth-rate HMS Exeter. He sailed with eight ships with orders to attack the French fishing harbours and their ships at sea at this early stage of the North American theatre of the War of the Spanish Succession. In this expedition 51 enemy ships were taken or destroyed. While in Newfoundland Leake also reported on the failure of the local people to observe legislation prohibiting trade with New England.

== Senior command ==
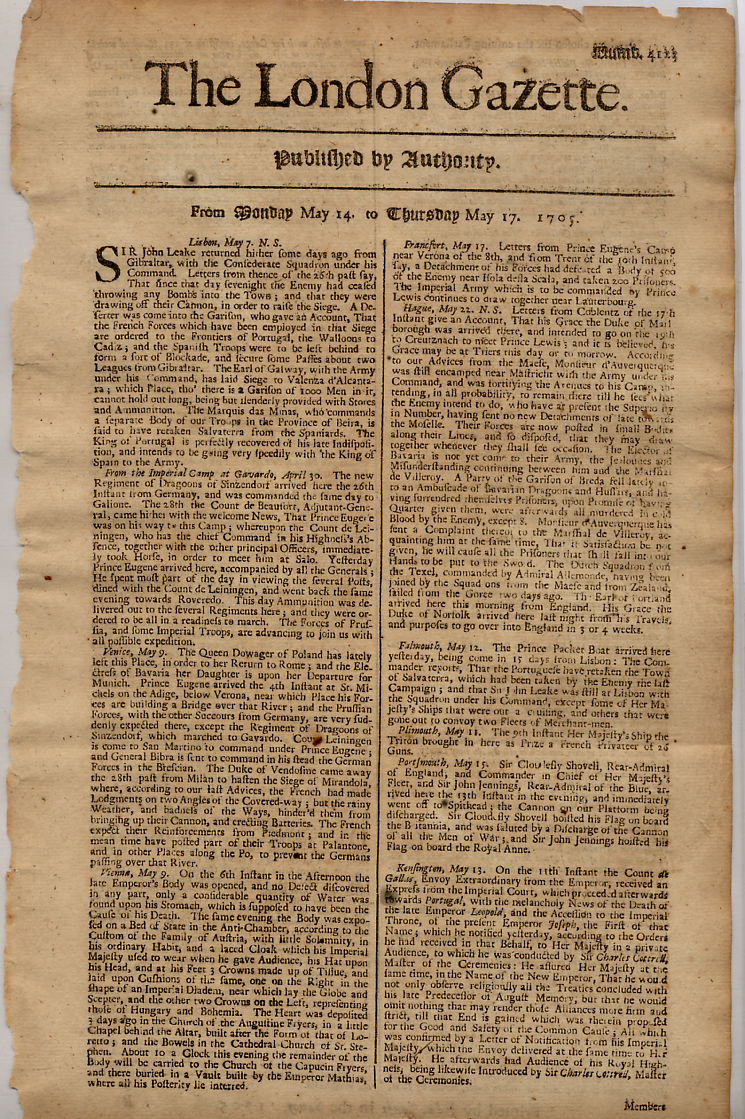
The London Gazette's 14 May 1705 issue detailing Leake's return from Gibraltar after the Battle of Cabrita Point

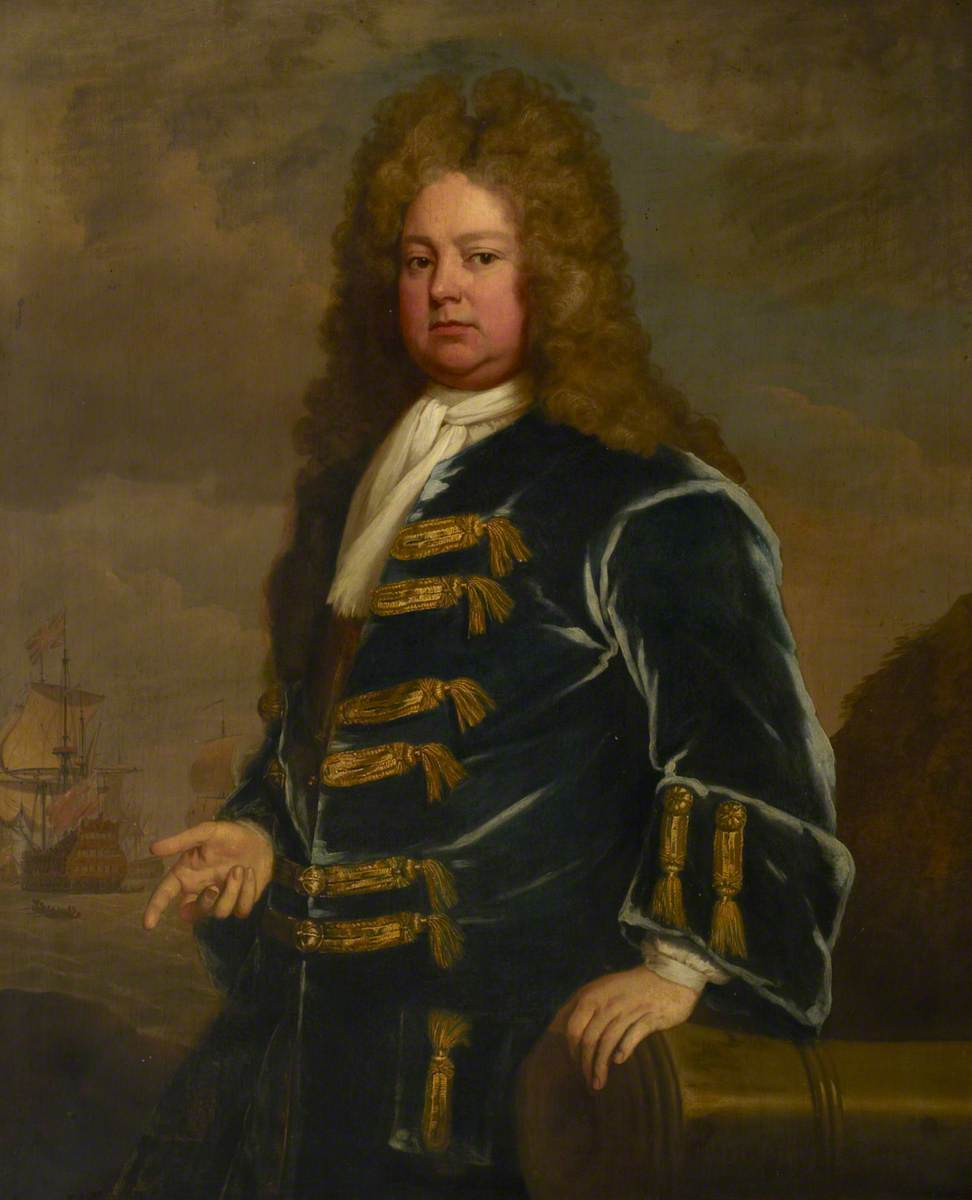
c. 1710 portrait of Leake by Michael Dahl

Promoted to rear admiral on 9 December 1702, Leake became Commander-in-Chief, Portsmouth in January 1703. Promoted to vice admiral in March 1703, he sailed, with his flag in the second-rate HMS Prince George, in a fleet dispatched under Admiral Sir Cloudesley Shovell to take troops to Lisbon in Spring 1703. Although his ship was caught in the great storm of December 1703, it suffered no serious damage.

Knighted in February 1704, Leake served as Second-in-Command to Admiral George Rooke at the Capture of Gibraltar in August 1704 and he commanded the vanguard in the Battle of Málaga later in the month. In October 1704 Field Marshal Prince George of Hesse-Darmstadt sent a message to Leake at Lisbon requesting his urgent assistance after the appearance of French ships in the Bay of Gibraltar. Leake set sail at once, bringing more supplies for the defenders who were caught in what became known as the twelfth siege of Gibraltar. Leake arrived with twenty ships and, in the subsequent naval engagement, three French ships were captured and two others destroyed. With Gibraltar safe for the moment, Leake left for Lisbon in January 1705 with the sick and wounded members of the garrison aboard his ships. He became Commander-in-Chief, Mediterranean Fleet in later that month and returned to Gibraltar with a combined English, Dutch and Portuguese force of 35 ships and defeated Baron de Pointis at the Battle of Cabrita Point in March 1705. The combined French and Spanish Fleet under Marshal Tessé gave up the siege as hopeless following an order from King Louis XIV of France in April 1705.

Leake served under Sir Cloudesley Shovell and the Earl of Peterborough at the Siege of Barcelona and was present at the capitulation of the city by French and Spanish forces in October 1705. A further siege took place between in April 1706 when a Franco-Spanish army led by Philip V of Spain laid siege to Barcelona in an attempt to recapture it. The Franco-Spanish army abandoned the siege when Leake arrived in May 1706. On the way back, he supported operations to capture Cartagena in May 1706, Alicante in July 1706, Ibiza in September 1706 and Mallorca later that month. Leake was promoted to full admiral, appointed Commander in Chief of the Mediterranean Fleet and given authority to fly the flag of an Admiral of the Fleet on 8 January 1708.

Leake was appointed a member of the council of the Lord High Admiral (an office vested at that time in Prince George of Denmark) in June 1708 and elected Member of Parliament for Harwich in May 1708 and Member of Parliament for Rochester in July 1708. He could not represent both seats and chose to represent the latter.

Meanwhile, back in the Mediterranean, Leake captured Sardinia in August 1708 and landed the Earl of Stanhope with forces that took the well-fortified harbour of Port Mahon on Minorca in September 1708. He was re-appointed Commander-in-Chief of the Navy for an expedition to the Baltic Sea in December 1708 and, after being appointed Rear-Admiral of Great Britain on 24 May 1709, went on to join the Board of Admiralty led by the Earl of Orford, as Senior Naval Lord, in November 1709. In Parliament he supported the prosecution of Henry Sacheverell in Spring 1710. Later that year he donated a new altarpiece, communion-table, rails and pavement for the chancel at St Mary's Church in Beddington where he owned a country house.

Leake became First Lord of the Admiralty in the Harley Ministry in November 1710, but declined to take a political position in that role, and was re-appointed Commander-in-Chief of the Navy for expeditions in January 1711 (for trade protection in the Channel) and in April 1712 (for an attack on Dunkirk). He stood down as First Lord of the Admiralty in September 1712 and reverted to his former role as First Naval Lord on the Admiralty Board. He was re-appointed Commander-in-Chief of the Navy for yet another expedition in March 1713 before resigning from the Admiralty Board in October 1714. Knowing that he would be perceived as a Tory, following his active involvement in the Harley Ministry, he stood down from Parliament immediately prior to the general election in 1715.

Leake died at his town house in Greenwich on 21 August 1720 and was buried at St Dunstan's, Stepney. John Campbell described him as a "virtuous, humane and gallant man, and one of the greatest admirals of his time."

== Family ==
In around 1681 Leake married Christiane Hill, daughter of Captain Richard Hill; they had one son.

== Sources ==
- Alexander, Marc (2008). Gibraltar: Conquered by No Enemy. Stroud, Gloucestershire: The History Press. ISBN 978-0-7509-3331-5.
- Campbell, John (1812). Lives of the British admirals: containing also a new and accurate naval history, from the earliest periods. Vol. 6. C. J. Barrington.
- Jackson, William G. F. (1986). The Rock of the Gibraltarians. Cranbury, NJ: Associated University Presses. ISBN 0-8386-3237-8.
- Laughton, John Knox (1892). "Leake, John (1656-1720)" . In Lee, Sidney (ed.). Dictionary of National Biography. Vol. 32. London: Smith, Elder & Co. pp. 317–320.
- Rodger, N.A.M. (1979). The Admiralty. Offices of State. Lavenham: T. Dalton Ltd. ISBN 0900963948.

Military offices
Preceded by Lord High Admirals Council (Last held by Sir George Rooke)	Senior Naval Lord; 1709–1710	Succeeded by Sir George Byng
Preceded by Sir George Byng	Senior Naval Lord; 1712–1714	Succeeded by Sir George Byng
Political offices
Preceded by Edward Russell	First Lord of the Admiralty; 1710–1712	Succeeded by Earl of Strafford
Parliament of Great Britain
Preceded by John Ellis; Thomas Davall	Member of Parliament for Harwich; May 1708 – December 1708; With: Thomas Frankland	Succeeded by Kenrick Edisbury; Thomas Frankland
Preceded by Sir Cloudesley Shovell; Sir Stafford Fairborne	Member of Parliament for Rochester; 1708–1715; With: Sir Stafford Fairborne to 1710; William Cage from 1710	Succeeded by Sir Thomas Palmer, Bt; Sir John Jennings
Honorary titles
Preceded by Vacant	Rear-Admiral of Great Britain; 1709–1714	Succeeded by Vacant
