= Peter Courthorpe =

Irish politician

Sir Peter Courthorpe (1624 – 1680) was an Irish politician.

Courthorpe was educated at Trinity College, Dublin.

Courthorpe represented Monaghan Borough from 1613 until 1615.
