= George Churchill (Royal Navy officer) =

Royal Navy officer and politician (1654–1710)

Admiral George Churchill
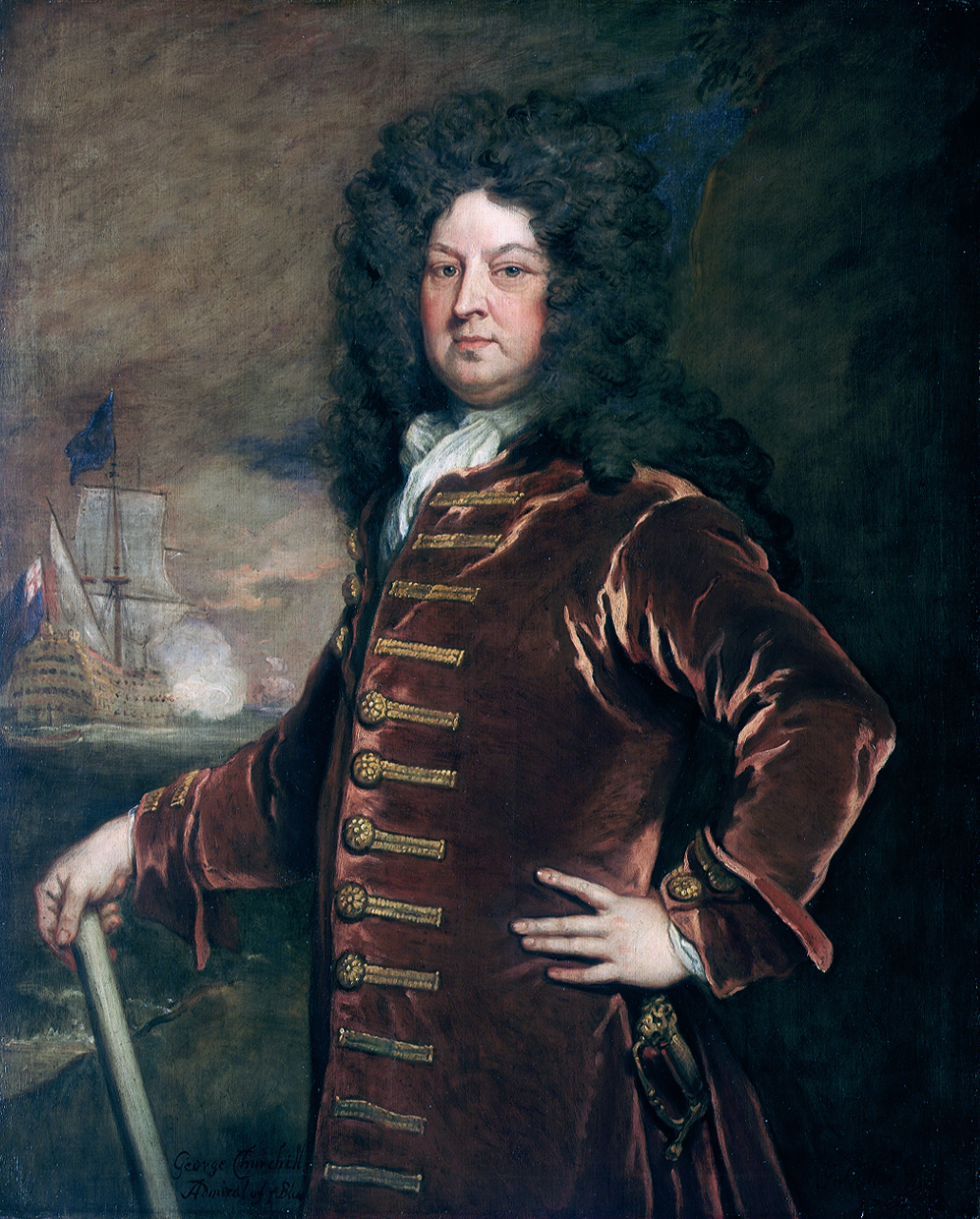
- Portrait by Godfrey Kneller, 1704
- Born: 20 February 1654; Minterne Magna, Dorset
- Died: 8 May 1710 (aged 56); Home Park, Windsor
- Burial place: Westminster Abbey
- Relatives: John Churchill, 1st Duke of Marlborough (brother); General Charles Churchill (brother); James FitzJames, 1st Duke of Berwick (nephew)
- Military career
- Allegiance: England; Great Britain
- Branch: Royal Navy
- Service years: 1666–1708
- Rank: Admiral of the Blue
- Unit: Lieutenant-Colonel Horse Guards 1691
- Commands: Lord Commissioner of the Admiralty 1699–1708
- Conflicts: Second Anglo-Dutch War; Third Anglo-Dutch War; Nine Years War; Bantry Bay Beachy Head Barfleur & La Hogue; War of the Spanish Succession
- Other work: Member of Parliament (MP); St Albans 1685–1708; Portsmouth 1708–1710

Admiral of the Blue George Churchill (20 February 1654 – 8 May 1710) was a Royal Navy officer and politician who served as a Lord Commissioner of the Admiralty from 1699 to 1702 and sat on the Lord High Admirals Council from 1702 to 1708. He was Member of Parliament for St Albans from 1685 to 1708, then Portsmouth from 1708 until his death in 1710. While considered by some an effective administrator, he achieved high office through Prince George of Denmark, husband of Queen Anne. He died in May 1710 and was buried in Westminster Abbey, next to his sister Arabella. He never married but left the bulk of his property to his illegitimate son, George Churchill (1687–1753).

== Life ==
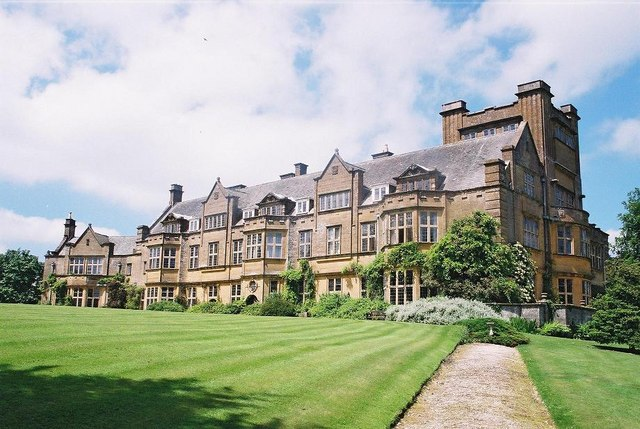
Churchill's birthplace, Minterne Magna, Dorset

George Churchill was born at Minterne Magna, Dorset on 20 February 1654, second surviving son of Sir Winston Churchill (1620–1688) of Glanvilles Wootton, Dorset and Elizabeth Drake, whose family came from Ash, in Devon. Winston served with the Royalist Army in the Wars of the Three Kingdoms and was heavily fined as a result, forcing his family to live at Ash House with his mother-in-law.

George had three surviving brothers, John, later Duke of Marlborough (1650–1722) and Charles (1654–1714). Another brother, Theobald, died in 1685. Charles often served as John's subordinate and both were political Whigs, while George was a Tory; they quarreled in later life and neither was an executor of his will.

He was closer to his sister Arabella (1648–1730), mistress of James II from 1665 to 1674 and mother of his eldest son, the Duke of Berwick (1670–1734). His will made a bequest to Francis Godfrey, another of Arabella's sons, and she was buried next to him in Westminster Abbey.

Although he never married, he acknowledged a son, George Churchill, from a relationship with a Mary Cooke, of whom little is known. Apart from the bequest to Francis, George inherited the bulk of his father's estate and became a general in the British Army.

== Career ==
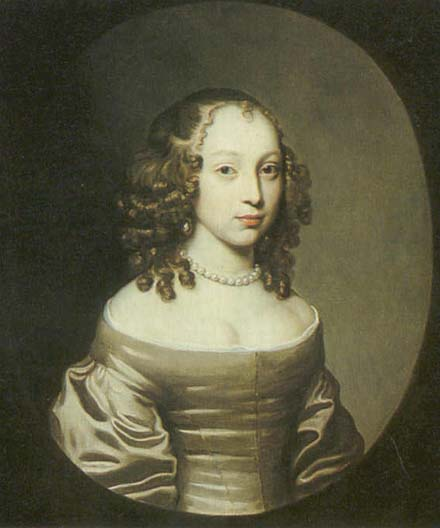
Arabella Churchill; George and his brothers owed their early success to her relationship with James

In 1665, Arabella Churchill became Maid of Honour to Anne Hyde and began an affair with her husband James, then Duke of York. This led to appointments for her three brothers and in 1666, George was commissioned as Lieutenant in the Royal Navy. He did not serve at sea, instead acting as page to the Earl of Sandwich, envoy to Spain from 1666 to 1668.

Returning from Spain in 1668, his father's financial troubles meant George spent a brief period as a Draper's apprentice, one of the powerful trade associations that dominated the City of London. He returned to military service during the Third Anglo-Dutch War in 1672 and thereafter held a series of positions in the army and navy.

Charles Churchill had previously served at the Danish court, where he became friends with Prince George of Denmark. In 1683, Prince George married James' younger daughter, 18-year-old Anne; John's wife Sarah Churchill was appointed Anne's Lady of the Bedchamber, while her brother-in-law Colonel Charles Griffin became Prince George's senior aide. The Churchills and their relatives formed a central part of the so-called 'Cockpit circle', named after Anne's apartments in Whitehall Palace. George was particularly close to Prince George and owed much of his later success to their friendship.

Later suggestions of a homosexual relationship between the two Georges appear to have originated with Sarah Churchill. She made similar allegations against Abigail Masham, who supplanted her as Anne's closest friend and often quarreled with her brother-in-law. Since Anne was very close to her husband and pregnant on no less than 18 occasions, such accusations were unwise and Sarah later withdrew them. The wider question on George's sexuality cannot be established; for a variety of reasons, younger sons often remained unmarried.

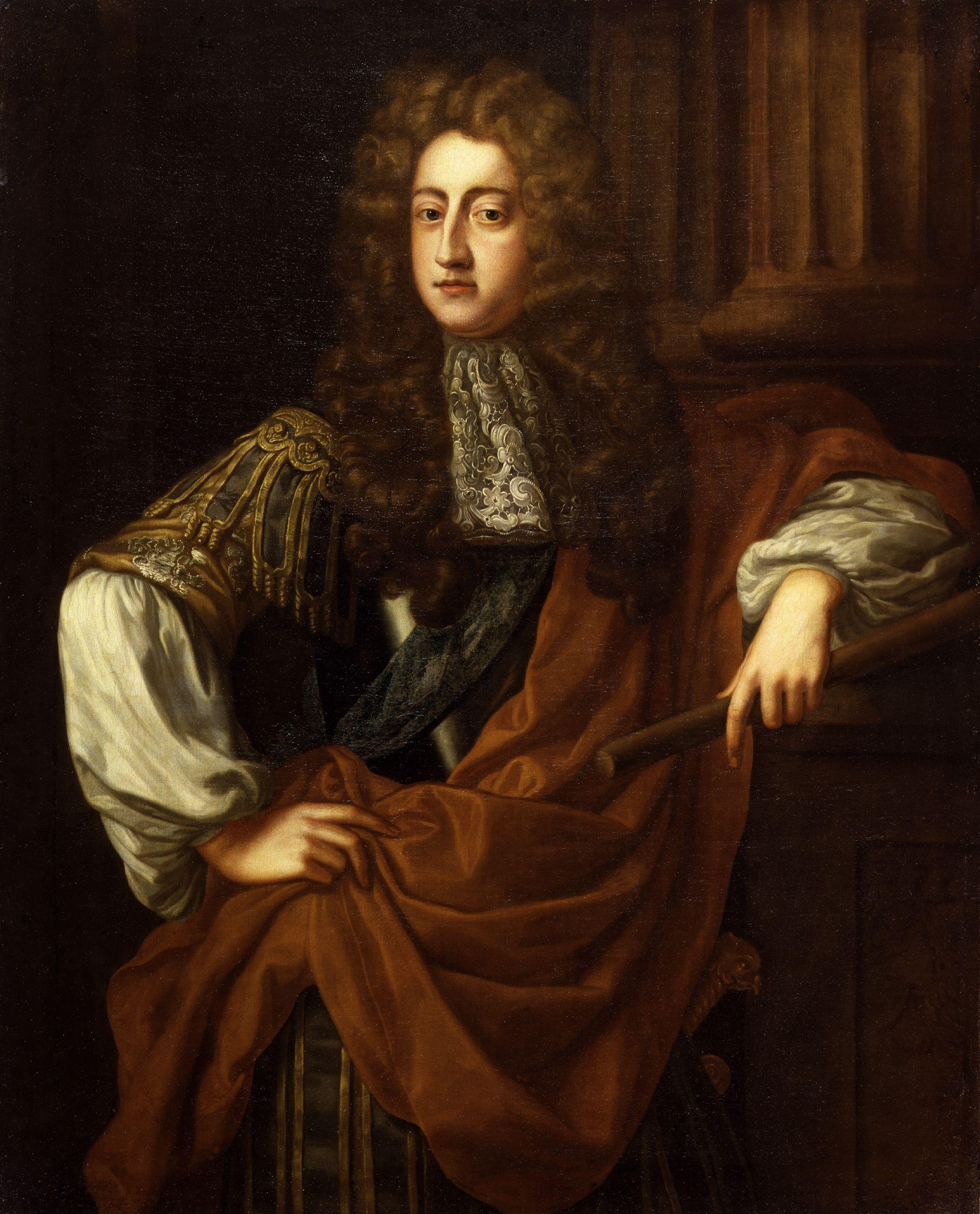
Prince George of Denmark, George Churchill's close friend and patron

Despite his Catholicism, James succeeded his brother Charles as king in 1685 with widespread support, particularly among the High Tory faction to which George belonged. Many did so on the principle of hereditary succession, especially important in a highly structured society, and fears his exclusion would lead to a repetition of the civil wars. In 1683, John Churchill purchased Holywell House, near St Albans, giving him control of the Parliamentary constituency of St Albans and in March 1685, George was elected Member of Parliament or MP. A few months later, James suspended Parliament for refusing to pass his measures; his Tory backers began to desert him after 1686, when his policies increasingly seemed to threaten the primacy of the Church of England.

His elder brothers were prominent in the army conspiracy against James, along with Charles Trelawny, a Tory army officer whose support secured the West Country ports of Torbay, Plymouth and Exeter. Prior to the November 1688 Glorious Revolution, George assumed command of HMS Newcastle; claiming his ship was leaking, he entered Plymouth shortly before it declared for William III on 18 November. This appears to have been planned in advance and was the first significant naval defection. He later submitted a vastly inflated bill for 'repairs' and was briefly imprisoned in the Tower of London for demanding payment for escorting merchant vessels.

He fought at Bantry Bay in May 1689 and Beachy Head in July 1690, a defeat that caused panic in England. Churchill was a close friend of the Earl of Torrington, commander at Beachy Head, who was ordered by Edward Russell to attack a French force considerably larger than his own. In the recriminations that followed, Torrington was court-martialled and acquitted but William dismissed him from the navy.

In 1691, Churchill was appointed Lieutenant-Colonel in the Horse Guards and commanded the 96-gun HMS St. Andrew at Barfleur & La Hogue in June 1692. However, the Torrington affair divided the navy and when Russell became First Lord of the Admiralty in 1693, he resigned from the service. He retained his seat as MP and continued his close links with Prince George; when Russell retired in 1699, he was appointed Lord Commissioner of the Admiralty.

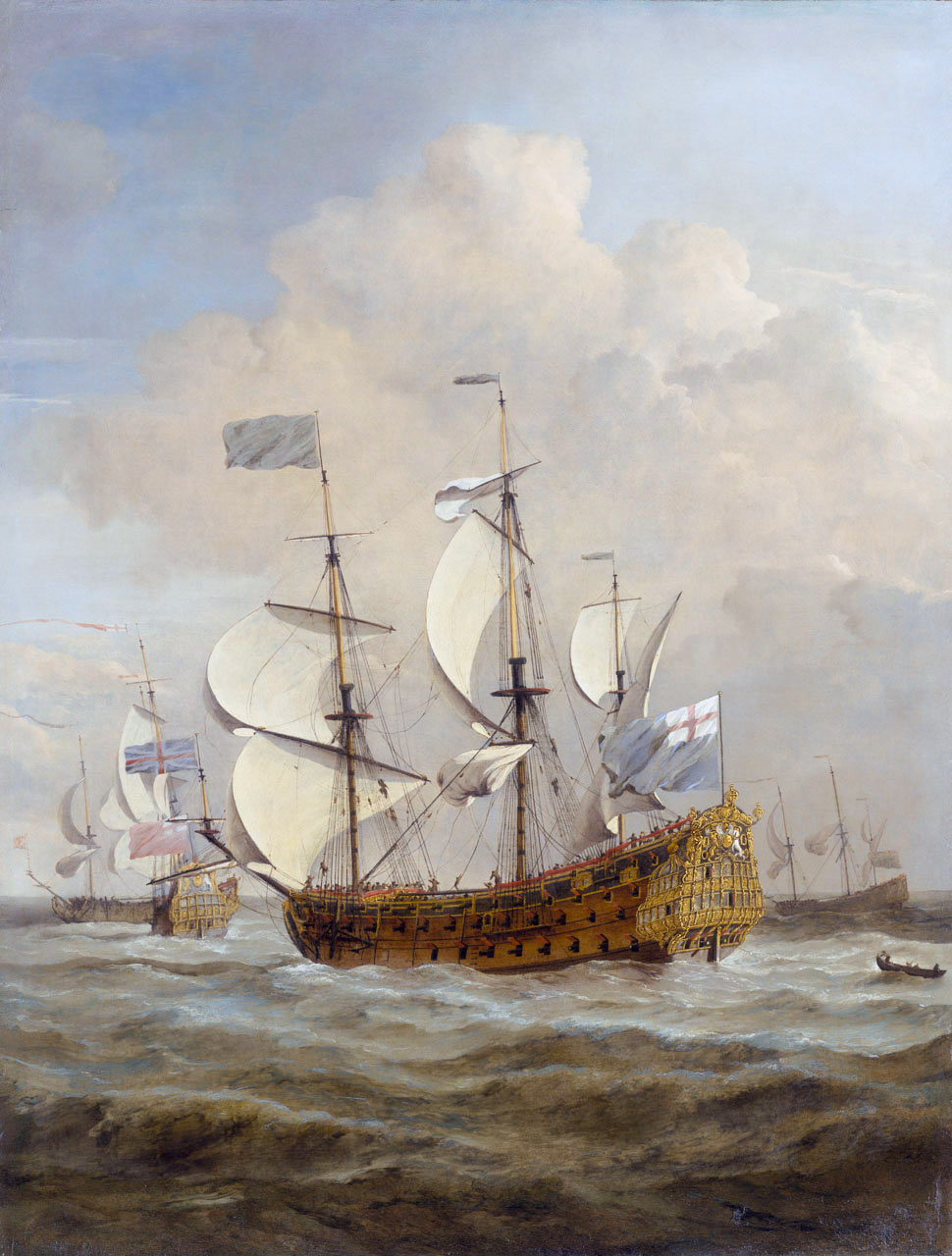
HMS St. Andrew, Churchill's last active naval command

After Anne succeeded William in 1702, her husband became Lord High Admiral and Churchill a member of the Lord High Admirals Council that advised him. For the next six years of the War of the Spanish Succession, the pair effectively controlled naval operations. In November 1707, criticism over the conduct of naval affairs culminated in demands by the ruling Whig Junto for Churchill's resignation. These were initially backed by some Tories, until they realised it meant replacing him with another Whig.

The underlying issue was war weariness; Marlborough's victory at Ramillies in 1706 raised hopes of a rapid end but a series of defeats in Spain during 1707 showed this was not the case. There were certainly failings in administration but part of the problem was different views on the navy's role; the Tories felt it should focus on protecting British merchant shipping, the Whigs wanted it to support land operations in the Mediterranean, including Italy, Southern France and Spain. Trying to do both meant it was over extended.

Prince George said he would resign if Churchill were forced out, while Tories in the Lords claimed failures in naval policy and Spain were caused by the unnecessary diversion of resources to Flanders to bolster Marlborough's reputation. The result was that George retained his position but only with support from the Crown and at the cost of an irrevocable breach with his elder brother. At the May 1708 General Election, he gave up the family-controlled seat of St Albans and was returned instead for Portsmouth.

When Prince George died in October 1708, the Council was dissolved and Churchill retired to a house in the Royal park at Windsor, where he maintained a famous aviary. On his death in May 1710, he left this to the Duke of Ormonde and his old friend the Earl of Torrington; the remaining estate of £24,000 was split between his son and nephew.

== Sources ==
- Gregg, Edward (1980). Queen Anne (2001 ed.). Routledge & Kegan Paul PLC. ISBN 978-0710004000.
- Harris, Tim (2005). Revolution: The Great Crisis of the British Monarchy, 1685–1720. Penguin. ISBN 978-0141016528.
- Hattendorf, John (2008). Churchill, George (Online ed.). Oxford DNB.
- Henning, DB, ed. (1983). CHURCHILL, George (1654-1710) in The History of Parliament: the House of Commons 1660–1690. Secker & Warburg.
- Holmes, Richard (2008). Marlborough: England's Fragile Genius. Harper Press. ISBN 978-0007225712.
- Knights, Mark (2002). "CHURCHILL, George (1654-1710), of Windsor Little Park". In Cruickshanks, Eveline; Handley, Stuart; Hayton, David W. (eds.). The History of Parliament: the House of Commons 1690-1715 (Online ed.). Boydell & Brewer.
- Lynn, John (1996). The Wars of Louis XIV, 1667-1714 (Modern Wars in Perspective). Longman. ISBN 978-0582056299.;
- Shinsuke, Satsuma (2013). Britain and Colonial Maritime War in the Early Eighteenth Century. Boydell Press. ISBN 978-1843838623.
- Somerset, Anne (2013). Queen Anne: The Politics of Passion. Knopf Publishing. ISBN 978-0307962881.
- Vivian, John Lambert (1895). The visitations of the county of Devon Volume 1-7; Comprising the herald's visitations of 1531, 1564, 1620. Exeter.
- Webb, Stephen Saunder (1995). Garrett, Jane (ed.). Lord Churchill's Coup: The Anglo-American Empire and the Glorious Revolution Reconsidered. Alfred a Knopf Inc. ISBN 978-0394549804.

Parliament of Great Britain
| Preceded by Sir Thomas Pope Blount; Sir Samuel Grimston | Member of Parliament for St Albans; 1685–1708; With: Sir Samuel Grimston (1685–1700); John Gape (1701–1708) | Succeeded by John Gape; Joshua Lomax |
| Preceded by Sir George Rooke; William Gifford | Member of Parliament for Portsmouth; 1708 to 1710 †; With: Sir Thomas Littleton | Succeeded by Sir Charles Wager; Sir John Jennings |
Military offices
| Preceded by Sir Robert Rich | Lord Commissioner of the Admiralty; 1699–1702 | Succeeded by Lord High Admirals Council |
