= John Gibson (British Army officer) =

Sir John Gibson (c. 1637 – 24 October 1717) was the founder of the 28th (North Gloucestershire) Regiment of Foot. He was also the Member of Parliament for Portsmouth in 1696–1698 and 1702.

== Life ==
He was son of Sir John Gibson, of Alderstone, in Ratho parish, near Edinburgh. He entered the Dutch army, and obtained a captain's commission dated 9 March 1675; as major, in 1688, he accompanied William of Orange to England.

He obtained from the English war office his commission as lieutenant-colonel on 28 February 1689; became colonel of a newly raised regiment on 16 February 1694; and colonel of a regiment to be raised (afterwards 28th (North Gloucestershire) Regiment of Foot) on 12 February 1702, holding the command until 1 February 1705. He was lieutenant-governor of Portsmouth from 28 May 1689, until his death on 24 October 1717.

He was commander-in-chief in 1697 of the land-forces sent to capture Newfoundland. He left England in March and returned in October, having secured the fishing rights of the English settlers. After unsuccessfully contesting the representation of Portsmouth in January 1696, he was elected for the borough in 1702, and was knighted by Queen Anne 6 September 1705.

== Family ==
He left two sons, Francis and James, and two daughters; Anne Mary, the eldest, married General Robert Dalzell (1662–1758). His brothers were Sir Alexander Gibson of Pentland and Adiston, clerk to the privy council of Scotland and Sir Thomas Gibson of Keirhill, baronet.
