= Portrait of Íñigo Melchor Fernandez de Velasco =

Painting by Bartolomé Esteban Murillo

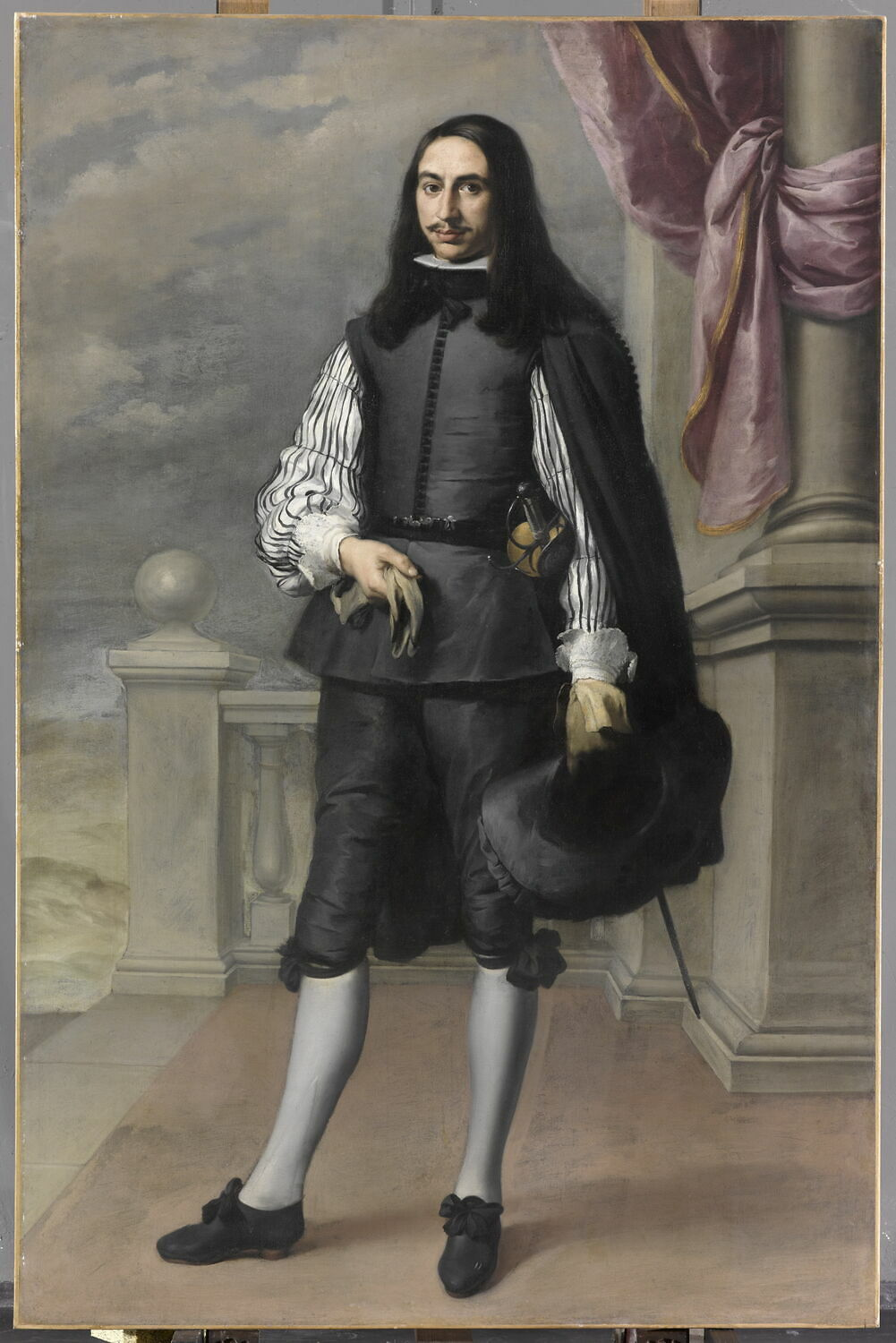
Portrait of Íñigo Melchor Fernandez de Velasco (1658–1659) by Bartolomé Esteban Murillo

Portrait of Íñigo Melchor Fernandez de Velasco is an oil on canvas by Bartolomé Esteban Murillo, from 1658 to 1659. It is a portrait of Íñigo Melchor de Velasco, constable of Castille. It is also known as The Gentleman from Seville due to a court case in which it was involved during the 1980s.

The work was owned by Jane St. Maur Blanche Stanhope, Marchioness Conyngham (1833–1907). It was then owned by various art dealers, namely Adrian Lesser in London, then Percy Moore Turner in Paris and London, then Julius Böhler in Munich in 1913, then François Kleinberger in Paris the following year. It has been in the Louvre since 1985.

== The Canson Affair ==
Jacques-Louis-René Barou de la Lombardière de Canson, a descendant of the famous paper maker Canson, left it to his daughter Suzanne in 1958. Her death in September 1986 at a villa in La Garde, Var
