= Ottone Enrico del Caretto, Marquis of Savona =

Imperial Army commander and political figure

Ottone Enrico del Caretto or Del Carretto, Marquis of Grana (Free Imperial City of Cologne 5 April 1639 – Mariemont, Hainaut 15 June 1685) was an Imperial Army commander and political figure.

== Early life ==
Descendant from the old Italian noble Del Carretto family, he was the son of Don Francesco del Carretto, 2nd Marquis of Grana, Count of Millesimo (1590-1652) and his second wife, Anna Eusebia Teufel von Guntersdorf (1613–1644). The first marriage of his father to Margarethe Fugger zu Nordendorff und Wörth (1592-1652) had been annulled in 1629, Francesco remarried in 1632 to Anna Eusebia.

Otto′s father Francesco served as Imperial general under Ottavio Piccolomini and became Imperial ambassador in Madrid in 1641. When his father and his oldest brother Ferdinand both died in 1651, Otto became titular Margrave of Savona, Marquis of Grana, Count of Millesimo, etc.

== Biography ==
He became instantly famous on 11 August 1675 in the Battle of Konzer Brucke, he engaged the right flank on exactly the right moment against the French under François de Créquy, inflicting a severe defeat. On the battlefield a Grana-memorial was erected in 1892.

He became a Knight of the Golden Fleece in 1678, Field Marshal of the Empire, Imperial ambassador in Madrid and General Captain and Governor of the Spanish Netherlands in April 1682.

== Marriage and issue ==
On 31 July 1667 he married Countess Maria Theresia von Herberstein (Graz 1641 – Brussels 1682), widow of Count Franz Adam von Losenstein (1631-1666). Together, they had two daughters:

- Maria Enrichetta (Vienna 1671 – Drogenbos 1744), Margravine of Savona and Marquesses of Grana, Countess of Millesimo, etc., married Philippe Charles d'Arenberg, 3rd Duke of Arenberg and Duke of Aarschot (1663–1691) in Brussels on 12 February 1684, who was killed in the Battle of Slankamen.
- Maria Gabriella, (Vienna 1675 – Brussels before 1700), married Charles François de la Barre, Comte d’Erquelinnes et de Olloy, Baron de Hierges in 1690.

After the death of his first wife Ottone Enrico married, on 10 June 1683, Princess Maria Theresa von Arenberg (1666–1716), sister of his son-in-law.

== Sources ==
- Hengerer, Mark (ed.). "Carretto, Otto Heinrich". Kaiser und Höfe. Personal database of the courtiers of the Austrian Habsburgs in the early modern period (in German).
- Arenberg family

Preceded by Alexander Farnese, Prince of Parma	Governor of the Spanish Netherlands; 1682–1685	Succeeded by Francisco Antonio de Agurto, Marquis of Gastañaga
