= Alessandro Farnese =

Alessandro Farnese may refer to:

- Pope Paul III (1468–1549), Roman Catholic Bishop of Rome
- Alessandro Farnese (cardinal) (1520–1589), Paul's grandson, Roman Catholic bishop and cardinal-nephew
- Alexander Farnese, Duke of Parma (1545–1592), Paul's great-grandson
- Alexander Farnese, Prince of Parma (1635–1689), governor of the Habsburg Netherlands
