= Charles III de Créquy =

French peer and soldier

Charles III de Blanchefort-Créquy
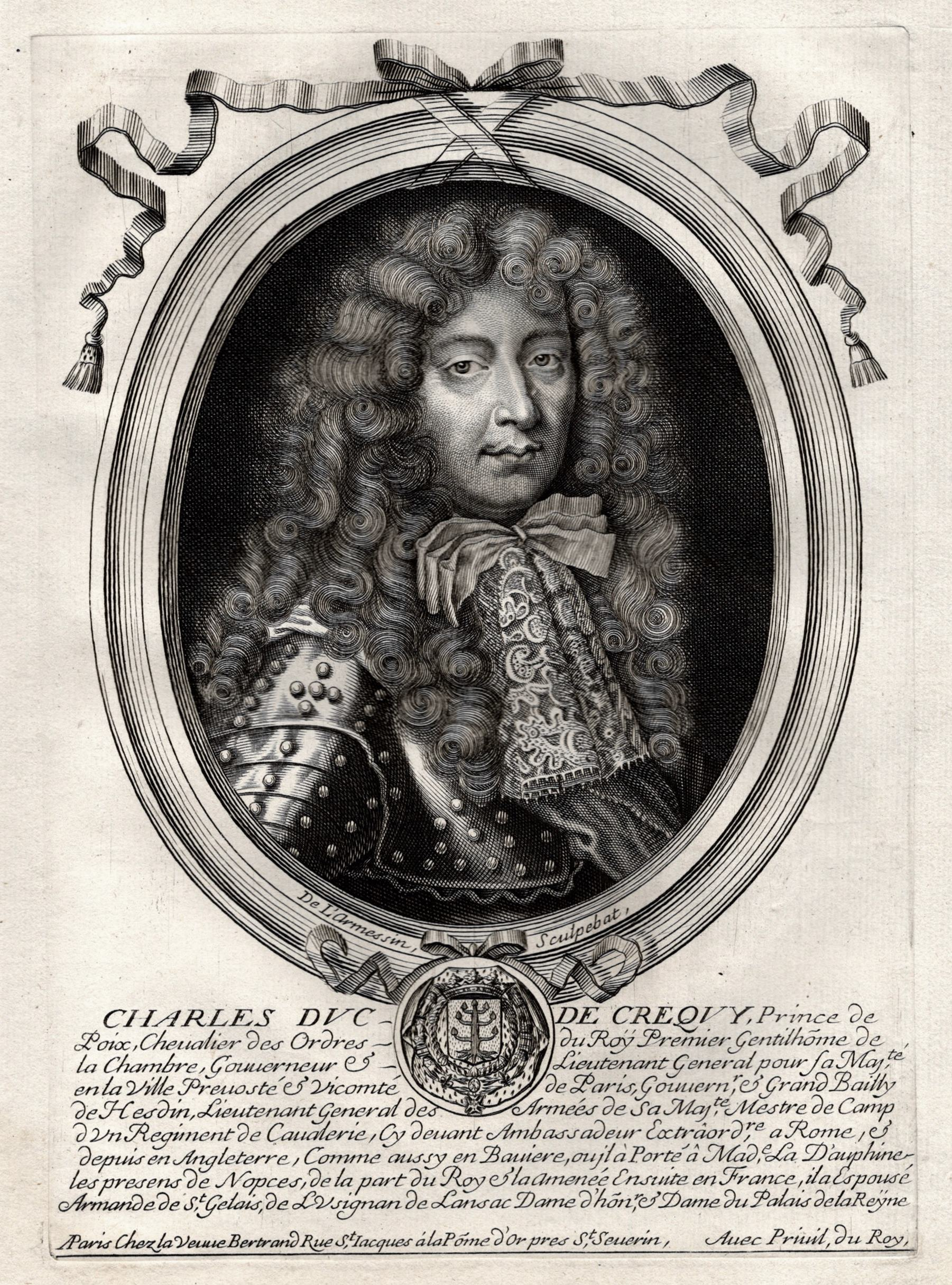
- Portrait by Nicolas II de Larmessin, 1678–1685
- Born: 24 March 1624; Poix-de-Picardie, Picardy, France
- Died: 13 February 1687 (aged 62); Paris, France
- Burial place: Church of Jacobins Saint-Honoré
- Military career
- Allegiance: France
- Branch: Army
- Service years: 1642–1653
- Rank: Lieutenant-general
- Conflicts: Fronde 1648–1653; Franco-Spanish War, 1635–1659; Siege of Orbetello (1646)
- Awards: Order of the Holy Spirit 1661
- Other work: Governor of Paris 1675; Special Ambassador to Rome and London 1662

Charles III de Blanchefort-Créquy, sieur de Blanchefort, prince de Poix, duc de Créquy (24 March 1624 – 13 February 1687) was a French peer and soldier, who also served Louis XIV as diplomat and advisor.

== Life ==
Charles III was the eldest of three sons born to Charles de Blanchefort (ca. 1598–1630), and Anne Grimoard du Roure (ca. 1601–1686). His youngest brother François de Créquy (1629–1687), became a Marshal of France; his other brother Alphonse (1628–1711) became the 6th duke of Lesdiguières in 1703 but was less successful than his siblings.

In 1653, he married Anne-Armande de Saint-Gelais (1637–1709) who later became chief Lady-in-waiting to Queen Maria Theresa. They had one daughter, Madeleine de Créquy (1655-1707), who married Charles-Belgique Hollande de La Trémoïlle,

== Career ==
Charles served in the French army during the Franco-Spanish War (1635–1659); he was wounded at the Siege of Orbetello in July 1646 and promoted Lieutenant-general. He was rewarded by Anne of Austria and Cardinal Mazarin for his loyalty to Louis XIV during the 1648-1653 civil war known as the Fronde; He was made comte de Créquy and raised to the peerage of France in 1652. The latter half of his life was spent at court, where he held the office of first gentleman of the royal chamber, which had been bought for him by his grandfather.

In 1659 the comte de Créquy was sent to Spain with gifts for the infanta Maria Theresa of Spain, and on a similar errand to Bavaria in 1680 before the marriage of the dauphin. He was ambassador to Rome from 1662 to 1665, and to England in 1677; and became governor of Paris in 1675. He died in Paris on 13 February 1687. His only daughter, Madeleine, married Charles Belgique Hollande de La Trémoille (1655–1709).

While the comte de Créquy was ambassador to Rome in 1662 he was insulted by the pro-Austrian pope Alexander VII in the Corsican Guard Affair. Alexander's Corsican Guard pulled down Charles' house, wounding his wife's servants and valets and killing one of Charles' pages. Louis XIV demanded that the governor of Rome, Alexander's nephew, come to apologise in person for this insult and that a pyramid be built in Rome in memory of the repairs.
