= Juan Domingo de Zuñiga y Fonseca =

Spanish military and political figure

General Juan Domingo Méndez de Haro y Fernández de Córdoba Consort Count of Monterrey Consort Count of Ayala Consort Count of Fuentes de Valdepero Consort Marques of Tarazona Consort Baron of Maldeghein
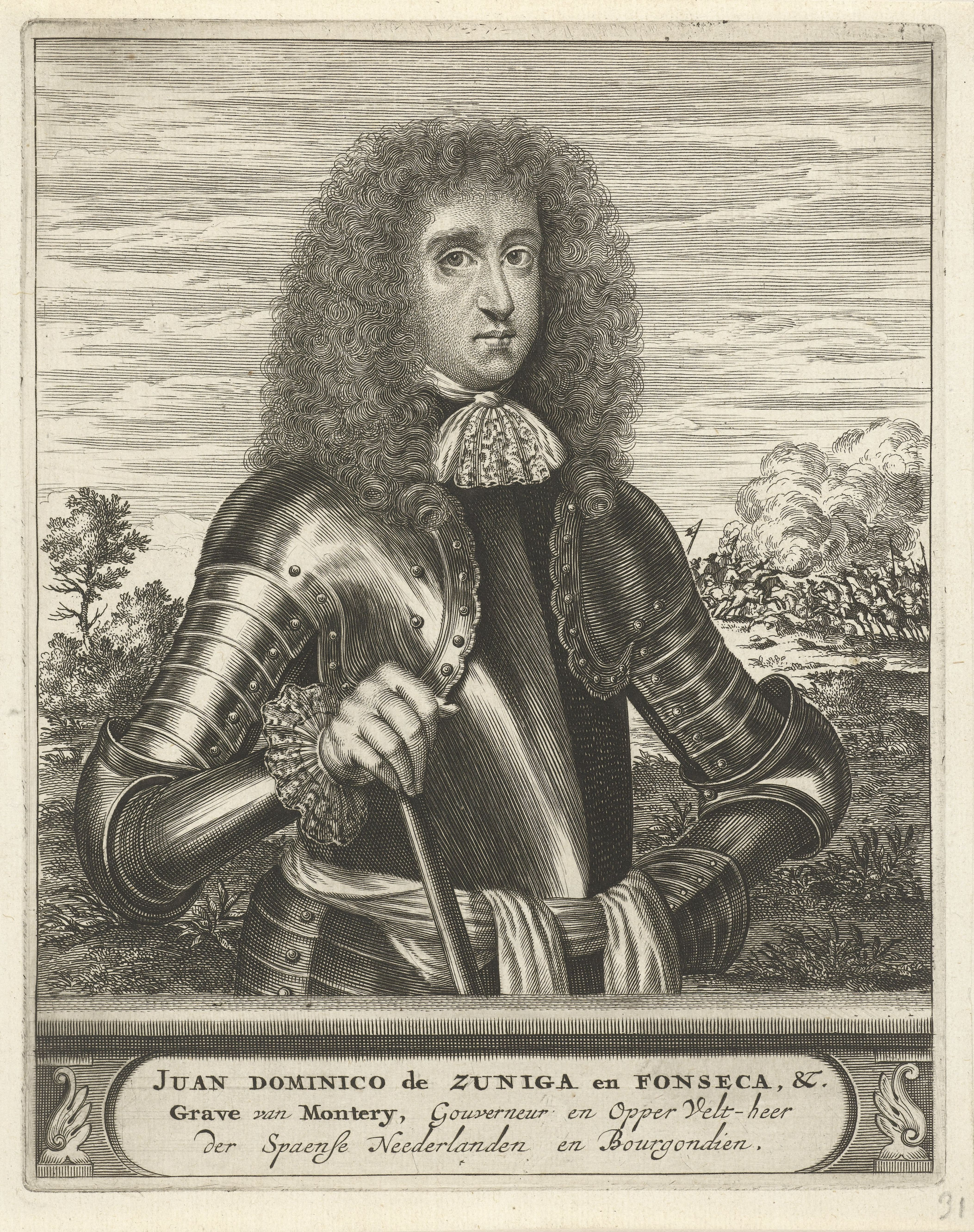
- Juan Domingo de Zuñiga y Fonseca
- Born: 25 November 1640; Madrid, Spanish Empire
- Died: 2 February 1716 (aged 75); Madrid, Spanish Empire
- Spouse: Inés Francisca de Zúñiga
- Relatives: Luis de Haro (father); Catalina Fernández de Córdoba (mother); Gaspar Méndez de Haro, 7th Marquess of Carpio (brother)
- Military career
- Allegiance: Spanish Empire
- Branch: Spanish Army
- Service years: 1663–1710
- Rank: General
- Conflicts: Franco-Dutch War: Battle of Tolhuis; Battle of Seneffe; Siege of Oudenaarde

Governor-General of the Spanish Netherlands
- In office June 1670 – 8 February 1675
- Monarch: Charles II
- Regent: Mariana of Austria
- Valido: Fernando de Valenzuela
- Preceded by: Íñigo Melchor de Velasco, 7th Duke of Frías
- Succeeded by: Carlos de Aragón de Gurrea, 9th Duke of Villahermosa

Viceroy of Catalonia
- In office 25 May 1677 – 13 June 1678
- Monarch: Charles II
- Preceded by: Alexander Farnese, Prince of Parma
- Succeeded by: Diego Dávila Mexía y Guzmán (as acting)

President of the Supreme Council of Flanders
- In office 1693 – June 1702
- Monarch: Charles II
- Chief Minister: Count of Oropesa; Luis Fernández Portocarrero
- Preceded by: Íñigo Melchor de Velasco, 7th Duke of Frías
- Succeeded by: France invaded the Spanish Netherlands

Juan Domingo Méndez de Haro y Fernández de Córdoba (Madrid, 25 November 1640 – Madrid, 2 February 1716) was a Spanish military and political figure. He was the son of Don Luis Méndez de Haro, 6th Marquis of Carpio, Prime Minister to King Philip IV of Spain, and of Doña Catalina Fernández de Córdoba.

== Biography ==
He married Doña Inés Francisca de Ayala y Zúñiga, 6th Countess of Monterrey, and eldest daughter of Don Fernando de Ayala, third Count of Ayala. Juan Domingo also used the family names and titles of his wife for himself.

In 1667 Méndez de Haro went to the Spanish Netherlands, where he became Captain General of the Cavalry in 1669. In 1670 he was appointed Governor of the Habsburg Netherlands and Captain General in the absence of Don John of Austria the Younger.

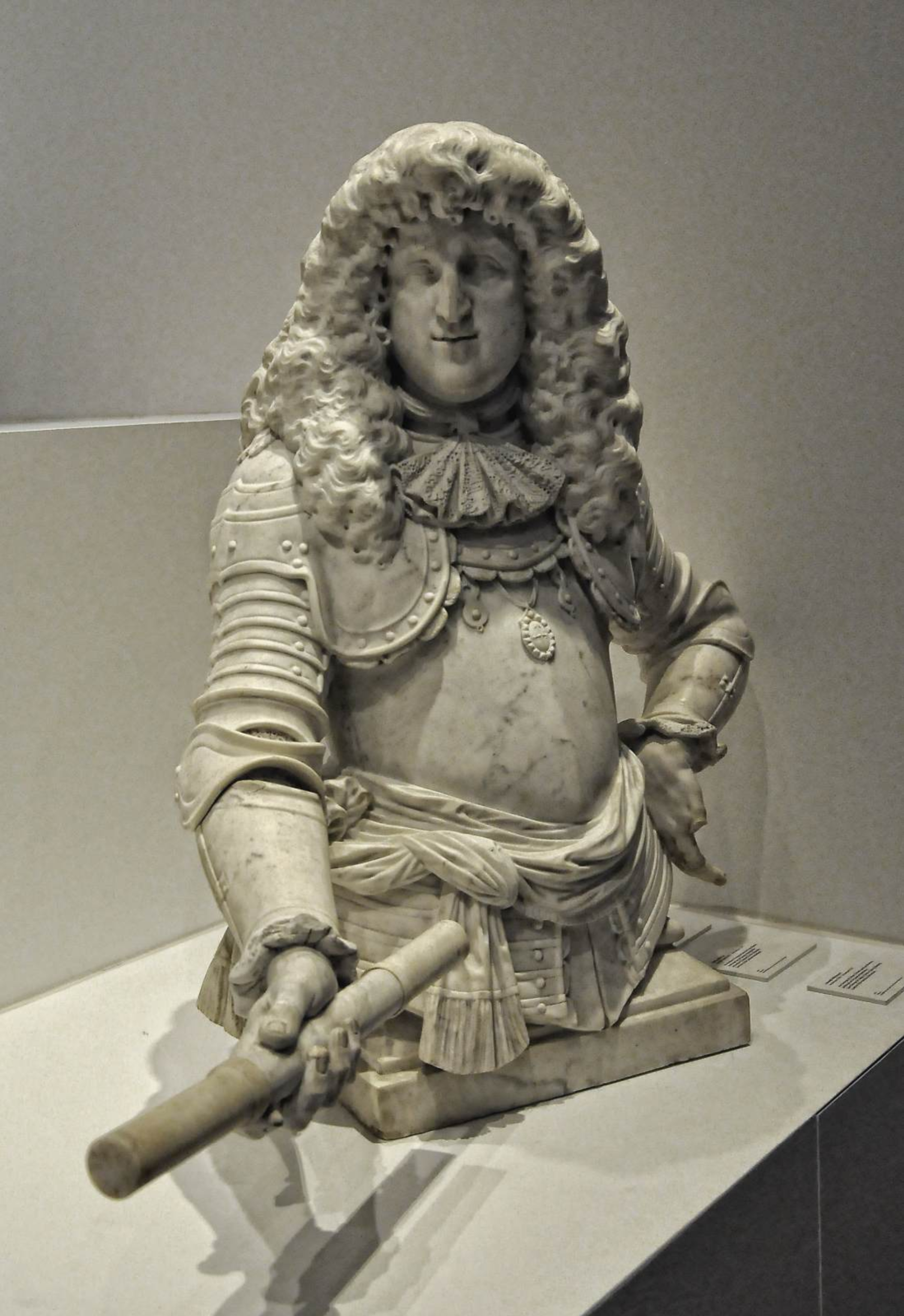
Juan Domingo de Zuñiga y Fonseca by Lodewijk Willemsens (1675)

In 1671, when war threatened between France and the Netherlands, Spain allied itself to the Netherlands and Méndez de Haro became Spanish supreme commander in the North. He organised defences, fortifying the Spanish fortresses along the French border. This could not prevent Spain and its defences from playing a minor part in the following Franco-Dutch War (1672–1678).

He was recalled to Spain on 8 February 1675. On 25 May 1677 he was named Viceroy of Catalonia, where he was also confronted with a French invasion. In 1678 he returned to Madrid where he became President of Flanders. He was admitted to the State Council in 1693. In 1705 under the French king Philip V of Spain he left the State Council together with the Marquis of Mancera.

In 1710 his wife died without issue and Méndez de Haro decided to dedicate the rest of his life to God and became a Catholic priest.

Government offices
| Preceded by Iñigo Fernandez de Velasco | Governor-General of the Spanish Netherlands; 1670–1675 | Succeeded by Carlos de Gurrea, Duke of Villahermosa |

== Sources ==
- Biography (in Spanish)
