= Bernardino Fernández de Velasco, 6th Duke of Frías =

Spanish nobleman and diplomat

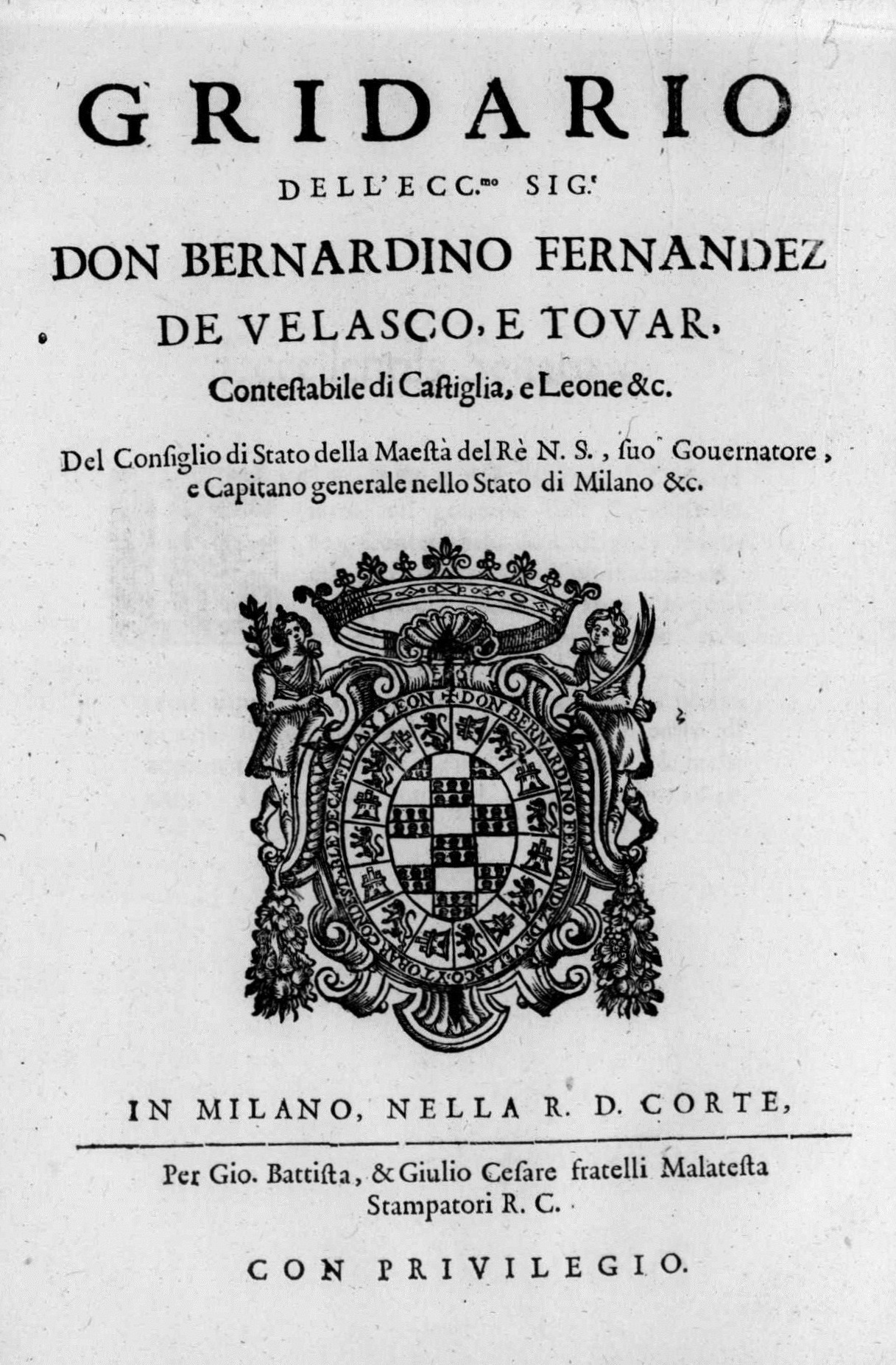
Gridario, Milan 1647

Bernardino Fernández de Velasco, 6th Duke of Frias, Grandee of Spain, (8 February 1609 – 31 March 1652), was a Spanish nobleman and diplomat.

== Biography ==
Bernardino Fernández de Velasco was the oldest son of Juan Fernández de Velasco and of María Angela de Aragón y Guzmán. He inherited the title of Constable of Castile and like his father, Bernardino was Governor of the Duchy of Milan between 1647 and 1648. He was also Viceroy of Aragon between 1645 and 1647. King John IV of Portugal was his nephew.

== Descendants ==
In 1629, the Duke married Isabel María de Guzmán, with whom he had four children. He married for a second time with María Enríquez Sarmiento de Mendoza, but they had no issue.

By Isabel María de Guzmán:

- Íñigo Melchor de Velasco, 7th Duke of Frías
- Juana de Velasco y Tovar, was married three times, with:
  - Enrique Felípez de Guzmán, 1st Marquis of Mayrena, 2nd Duque of Sanlúcar de Barrameda
  - Alonso Melchor Téllez-Girón y Pacheco
  - Juan Enríquez de Borja, 7th Marquis of Alcañices
- Francisco de Velasco, 5th Marquis of Berlanga
- Andrea de Velasco, was married twice, with:
  - Manuel Enríquez de Almansa, 10th Count of Alba de Liste
  - Lorenzo de Cárdenas, 13th Count of la Puebla del Maestre

== Works ==
- Fernández de Velasco y Tobar, Bernardino (1647). Gridario dell'eccellentissimo signor don Bernardino Fernandez de Velasco (in Italian). Milano: Giovanni Battista Malatesta &.

== Sources ==
- Castro Pereira Mouzinho de Albuquerque e Cunha, Fernando de (1995). Instrumentário Genealógico - Linhagens Milenárias (in Portuguese). pp. 329–30.
- Hobbs, Nicolas (2007). "Grandes de España" (in Spanish).
- Instituto de Salazar y Castro. Elenco de Grandezas y Titulos Nobiliarios Españoles (in Spanish). periodic publication.
- "Genealogia" (in Portuguese). Archived from the original on March 8, 2007.

Government offices
Preceded by The Prince of Trivulzio	Viceroy of Aragon; 1645–1647	Succeeded by Francisco de Melo
Preceded by Antonio Sancho Davila, Marquis of Velada	Governor of the Duchy of Milan; 1647–1648	Succeeded by Luis de Benavides Carrillo, Marquis of Caracena
Military offices
Preceded by Juan; Fernández de Velasco	Constable of Castile; 1613-1652	Succeeded by Íñigo de Velasco
Spanish nobility
Preceded by Juan; Fernández de Velasco	Duke of Frías; 1613-1652	Succeeded by Íñigo de Velasco
Preceded by Juan; Fernández de Velasco	Marquis of Berlanga; 1540–1585	Succeeded by Francisco de Velasco
