= François de Créquy =

French noble and soldier

François de Blanchefort de Créquy, Marquis de Marines
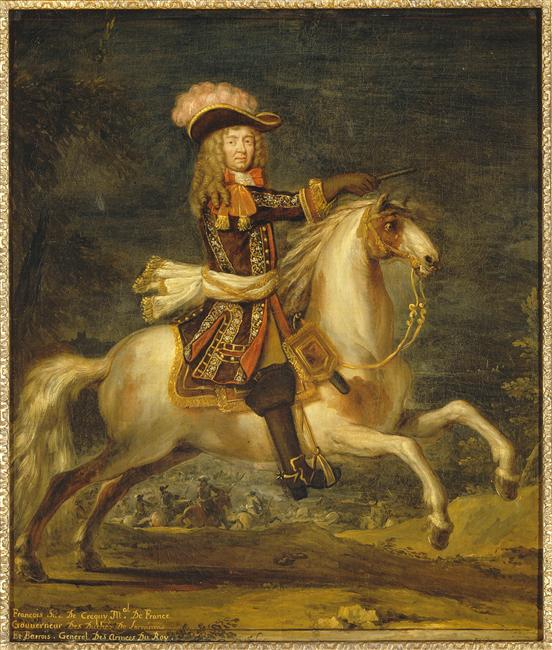
- François de Blanchefort de Créquy, Marquis de Marines by Joseph Parrocel
- Born: 2 October 1629; Poix-de-Picardie Picardy
- Died: 3 February 1687 (aged 57); Paris
- Burial place: Church of Jacobins Saint-Honoré
- Military career
- Allegiance: France
- Branch: Army
- Service years: 1648–1684
- Rank: Marshal of France 1668
- Conflicts: Fronde; Franco-Spanish War (1635–1659); Arras 1654; The Dunes 1658; War of Devolution 1667-1668; Lille; Occupation of Lorraine 1670; Franco-Dutch War; Konzer Brücke; Trier; Freiburg; Ortenbach; War of the Reunions 1683-1684; Luxembourg
- Awards: Order of the Holy Spirit

François de Blanchefort de Créquy, later Marquis de Marines (2 October 1629 – 3 February 1687), was a 17th-century French noble and soldier, who served in the wars of Louis XIV.

He came from a powerful and well-connected family, his grandfather Charles I de Blanchefort (1578–1638) being a Marshal of France. Rewarded for supporting the Royalists during The Fronde (1648–1653), his elder brother Charles (1623–1687) was a senior advisor to Louis while François had a successful military career.

Promoted to Marshall in 1668, like other French soldiers of his generation he was over shadowed by Condé and Turenne. He fell from favour in April 1672 and although subsequently reinstated failed to regain his former prestige. He retired from service in 1684 and died in Paris in 1687.

== Life ==
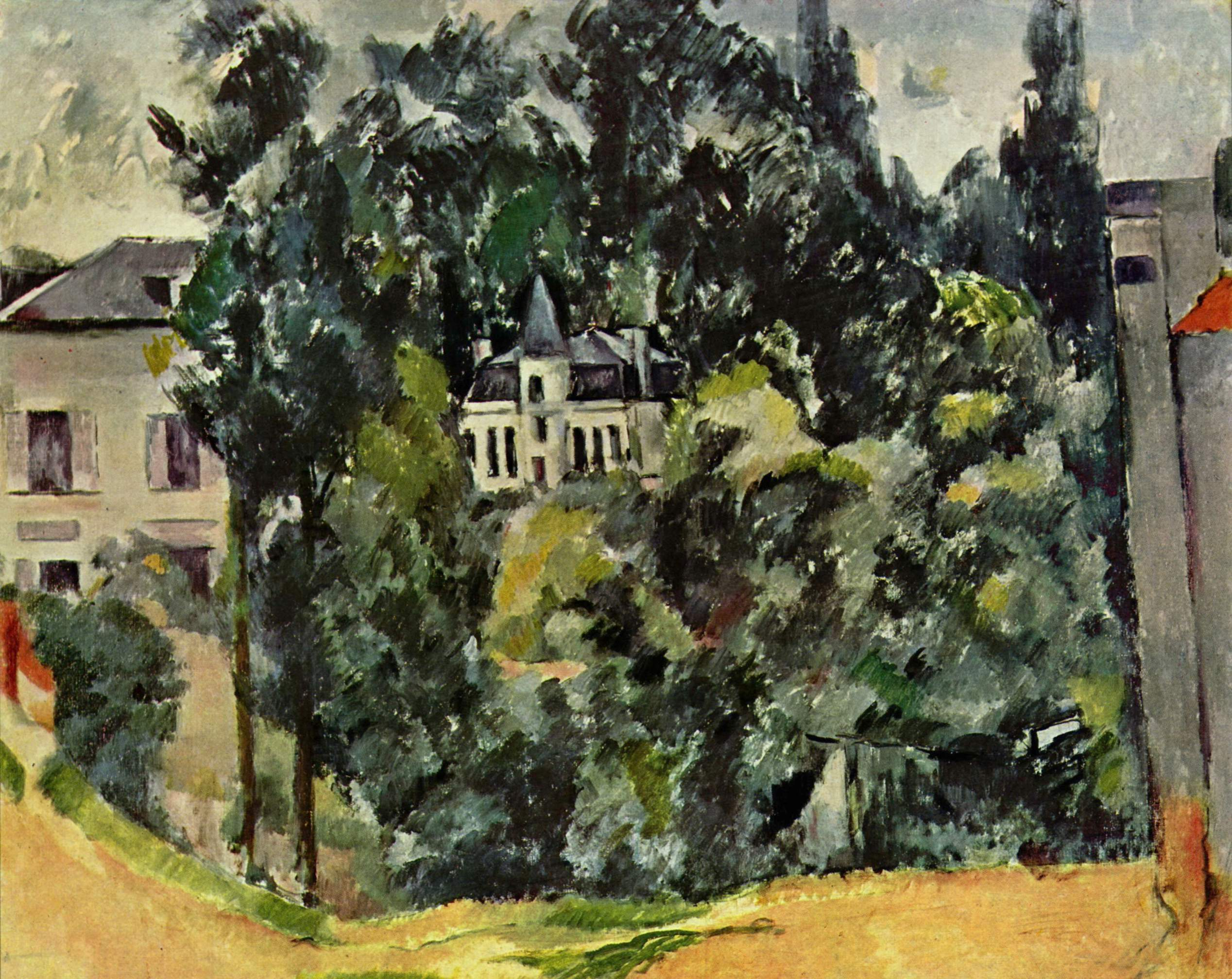
Paul Cézanne, 'Château des environs de Paris' 1890 (unfinished); the Chateau de Marines, constructed by de Créquy in the 1660s

François de Blanchefort de Créquy was born in Poix-de-Picardie on 2 October 1629, youngest of three sons of Charles de Blanchefort (ca 1598–1630) and Anne Grimoard du Roure (c. 1601–1686). The family originated in Créquy, Artois, part of the Spanish Netherlands until annexed by France in 1659; branches were distributed throughout Northern France, including Bernieulles, Auffay and Heilly, while 'de Créquis' served in the armies of the Dutch Republic and Sweden.

His grandfather, Charles I de Blanchefort (1578–1638), was a trusted advisor to Louis XIII and a Marshal of France, who commanded French troops at the 1636 victory of Tornavento; his father died at the siege of Chambéry in 1630.

His eldest brother Charles (1623–1687) was one of Louis XIV's closest counsellors, whose wife served as chief Lady-in-waiting to Queen Maria Theresa. Their middle brother Alphonse (1628–1711) inherited the title of duc de Lesdiguières in 1703 but in general had a less distinguished career than his siblings.

In 1657, de Créquy married Catherine de Rougé (1641–1713); they had two children, François Joseph (1662–1702), killed at Luzzara, and Nicolas Charles (1669–1696) who died of disease at Tournai. He became the Marquis de Marines after purchasing the lordship of Marines, Val-d'Oise in 1659.

== Career ==
The first half of the 17th century in France was a period of intense internal and external conflict. A series of Huguenot rebellions broke out in the 1620s, while French support for the Dutch rebellion against Habsburg Spain led to the Franco-Spanish War (1635–1659). The internal tensions that resulted culminated in 1648 with the Fronde, a struggle for control between regional magnates like Condé, and a Court party headed by Anne of Austria, mother of the 8 year old Louis XIV, and Cardinal Mazarin. It was largely suppressed by 1652, but the war with Spain continued.

Like his elder brother, de Créquy supported the Royalists during the Fronde and by 1658 he was a Lieutenant-General. He commanded the French right under Turenne at The Dunes in June, a decisive victory that led to the 1659 Treaty of the Pyrenees. Shortly afterwards, de Créquy purchased the Chateau of Marines, adding formal gardens by André Le Nôtre, the leading landscape designer of the period; it remained in the family until 1714 and was painted by Paul Cézanne in 1890.

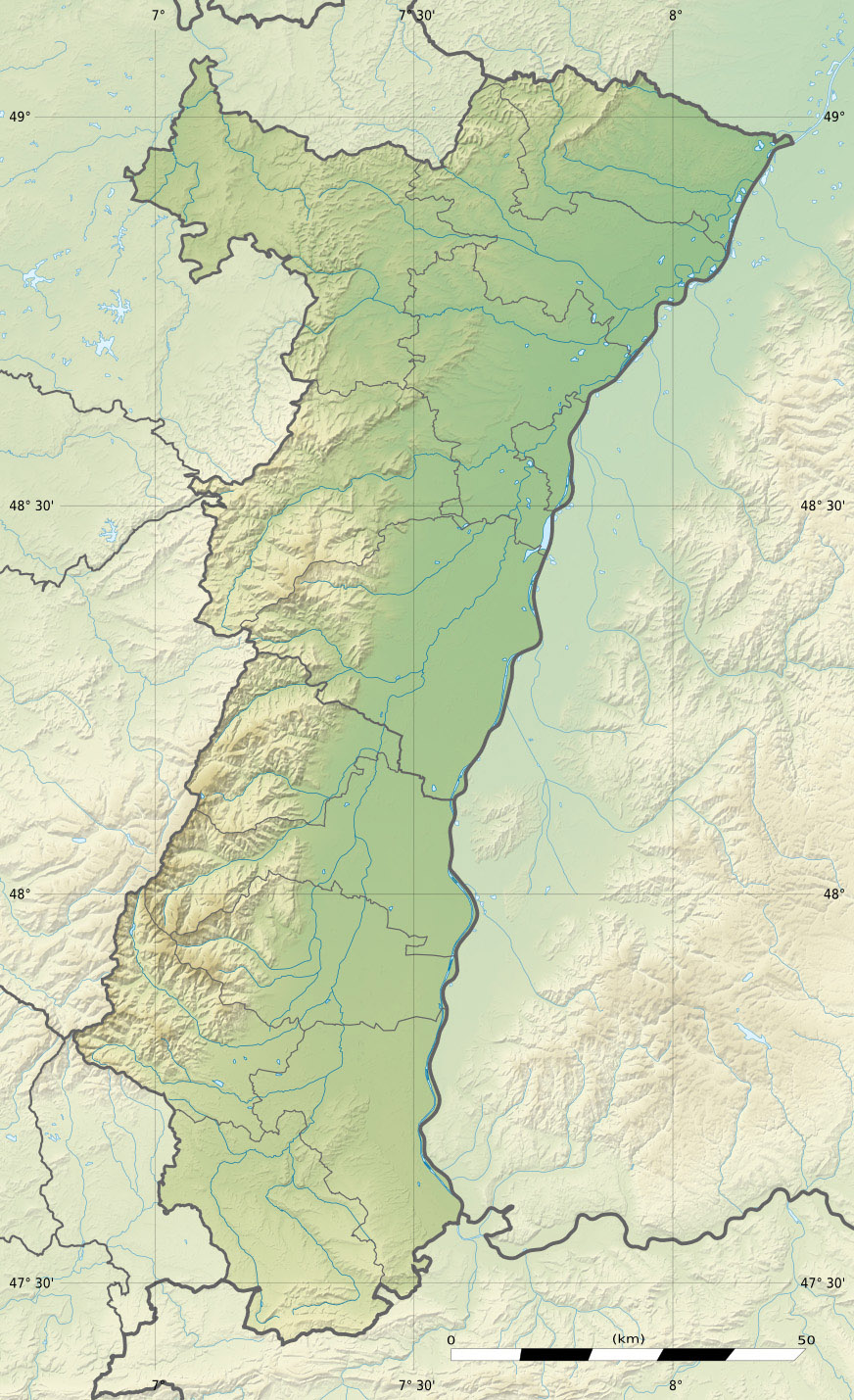
The 1678 campaign in Alsace; the Rhine (blue) marks the modern border with Germany

In September 1667 during the War of Devolution, a French army captured the strategic town of Lille; the Spanish relief force arrived too late and Turenne detached cavalry under Bellefonds and de Créquy to cut off their retreat. Supported by Humières, they inflicted nearly 2,000 casualties and in the excitement of victory, Louis impulsively promoted all three to Marshals of France. Despite capturing large areas of the Spanish Netherlands, a Dutch-led coalition forced France to return most of their gains in the Treaty of Aix-la-Chapelle (1668) and Louis began plans to attack the Republic directly.

As part of this process, de Créquy commanded an army that occupied the strategic Duchy of Lorraine in August 1670. By early 1672, French preparations were complete but the problems caused by Louis' promotions now became apparent. Since Marshals were subordinate only to the king, they could not serve under another and as their numbers were always greater than the positions available, it led to bitter arguments over status. When Turenne was appointed commander of the invasion force in April 1672, Bellefonds, Humières and de Créquy refused to serve under him; all three were sentenced to internal exile and de Créquy retired to Marines.

The Franco-Dutch War began in May and the French initially seemed to have achieved an overwhelming victory. However, by late July the Dutch had stabilised their position, with support from Emperor Leopold and Charles II of Spain opening new fronts in Spain and the Rhineland. With the expansion of the war, de Créquy returned to service in 1673 but an attempt to relieve Trier was defeated at Konzer Brücke in August 1675. Despite fighting his way through enemy lines to reach the town and organise the defence, in September the unpaid and starving garrison mutinied and forced him to surrender. A relatively minor setback, this defeat clearly rankled and was specifically mentioned in the eulogy delivered at Louis' funeral in 1715.

Although it damaged his standing, the death of Turenne at Salzbach in July 1675 and Condé's retirement meant de Créquy was given a new command in early 1678. With negotiations near completion at Nijmegen, Louis planned a short campaign to strengthen his position in the Spanish Netherlands and remaining on the defensive elsewhere. De Créquy was instructed to avoid battle and ensure the retention of Freiburg, which he had taken by surprise in November 1677 and was now threatened by an Imperial army of 30,000 under Charles V, Duke of Lorraine. He won two quick victories over Charles at Rheinfelden and Ortenbach, forcing him back into the Electoral Palatinate, then captured Kehl and its bridge over the Rhine.

This success partially restored his reputation and in 1681 he supervised the siege of the Fortress of Luxembourg, withdrawing after France annexed Strasbourg before capturing it during the War of the Reunions in 1684. This was his final military action; he died in Paris on 3 February 1687, ten days before his brother Charles on 13th. De Créquy and his wife were buried in the church attached to the convent of Saint-Honoré in Paris, demolished in 1816. Their memorial was designed by Charles Le Brun and executed by Antoine Coysevox; when the Jacobin club took over the church during the French Revolution, this was moved to the Church of Saint-Roch, where it can be seen today.

De Créquy is referenced by the English playwright John Dryden in his 1678 work Mr. Limberman or the Kind Keeper.

== Sources ==
- Cézanne. "Castle of Marines, 1890 - by Paul Cezanne". Paulcezanne.org.
- Dearing, Vinton; Roper, Alan, eds. (1992). The Works of John Dryden; Volume XIV (2013 ed.). Hardpress. ISBN 978-1314579512.;
- De Périni, Hardÿ (1896). Batailles françaises, Volume V (in French). Ernest Flammarion, Paris.;
- Hanlon, Gregory (2016). The Ordeal of Tornavento in Italy 1636: Cemetery of Armies (2018 ed.). OUP. ISBN 978-0198738251.;
- Lynn, John (1996). The Wars of Louis XIV, 1667-1714 (Modern Wars In Perspective). Longman. ISBN 978-0582056299.;
- Massillon, François; Aizpurua, Paul (2004). Oraison funèbre de Louis XIV: 1715. Editions Jérôme Millon. ISBN 978-2841371587.;
- McCluskey, Phil (2009). French Military Occupations of Lorraine and Savoy, 1670-1714 (Thesis). University of St Andrews.;
- Pattou, Etienne. Seigneurs de Créquy - Racines & Histoire (PDF) (in French).
- Rowlands, Guy (2002). The Dynastic State and the Army under Louis XIV: Royal Service and Private Interest 1661-1701. CUP. ISBN 978-0521144742.
- Swann, Julian (2017). Exile, Imprisonment, or Death: The Politics of Disgrace in Bourbon France, 1610-1789. OUP. ISBN 978-0198788690.
- Tucker, Spencer C (2009). A Global Chronology of Conflict: From the Ancient World to the Modern Middle East 6V: A Global Chronology of Conflict [6 volumes]. ABC-CLIO. ISBN 978-1851096671.;

French nobility
| Preceded by | Marquis de Marines; 1632–1687 | Succeeded by |
