= Francisco Baltasar de Velasco, 5th Marquis of Berlanga =

Francisco de Velasco, 5th Marquis of Berlanga, (in full, Spanish: Don Francisco Baltasar de Velasco y Tovar, quinto marqués de Berlanga, señor de la Casa y Estado de Tovar, comendador de Yeste y Taivilla, caballero de Santiago, gentilhombre de cámara del rey Carlos II), (c.1637 - c.1690), was a Spanish nobleman.

== History ==
Tovar was the second son of Bernardino Fernández de Velasco, 6th Duke of Frías and of Isabel María de Guzmán. He married María Catalina de Carvajal Cobos Mendoza y Manrique, 4th Marchioness of Jódar, with whom he had 5 children.

- José Fernández de Velasco, 8th Duke of Frías
- Manuel de Velasco
- Isabel de Velasco y Carvajal
- María Victoria de Velasco y Tovar
- Manuela de Velasco

== Sources ==
- Castro Pereira Mouzinho de Albuquerque e Cunha, Fernando de (1995). Instrumentário Genealógico — Linhagens Milenárias (in Portuguese). pp. 329–30.
- Costa Felgueiras Gaio, Manuel José da. Nobiliário das Famílias de Portugal (in Portuguese). Vol. VII. Portugal: Beltroens.
- Hobbs, Nicolas (2007). "Grandes de España" (in Spanish).
- Sousa, Dom António Caetano de (1946). História Genealógica da Casa Real Portuguesa (in Portuguese). Vol. VI (2ª Edição ed.). Coimbra, Portugal: Atlântida-Livraria Editora, Lda. p. 323.
- Instituto de Salazar y Castro. Elenco de Grandezas y Titulos Nobiliarios Españoles (in Spanish). periodic publication.

Spanish nobility
| Preceded by Bernardino; Fernández de Velasco | Marquis of Berlanga; 1652–1690 | Succeeded by José; Fernández de Velasco |
