= Battle of Konzer Brücke =

1675 battle of the Franco-Dutch War

Coordinates: 49.694°N 6.559°E

- Part of the Franco-Dutch War
| Date | 11 August 1675 |
| Location | Konz, near Trier (present-day Germany) |
| Result | Imperial victory |

Belligerents
| Kingdom of France | Holy Roman Empire; Brunswick-Lüneburg; Lorraine |

Commanders and leaders
| (Kingdom of France) François de Créquy | (Lorraine) Charles IV; George William (Holy Roman Empire) Otto Caretto de Grana |

Strength
| 14,000 men | 17,000 men |

Casualties and losses
| 2,500 killed or wounded 2,400 captured 10 guns lost | 1,100 killed or wounded |

The Battle of Konzer Brücke (also: Consaarbrück) was fought as part of the Franco-Dutch War on 11 August 1675 and resulted in an Imperial victory.

== Prelude ==
In 1675 Montecuccoli and Turenne had been manoeuvering between Philippsburg and Strassburg for an advantage, each seeking to cover his own country and to live upon that of the enemy. At last Turenne prevailed and had the Imperialists at a disadvantage on the Sasbach, where, in opening the action, he was killed by a cannon-shot (27 July).

Devastated by the loss of their commander, the French hastily surrendered all their advantages, and Montecucculi sharply following up their retreat, and drove them over the Rhine and almost to the Vosges.

At the same time the Imperial forces under Charles IV, Duke of Lorraine were besieging Trier, which Turenne had taken in the autumn of 1673.

== Battle ==
Créquy was sent with 14,000 men and 11 guns to relieve the city. They were stopped at the bridge over the Saar River at Konz.

The Imperialists sent a force under Ottone Enrico Del Carretto, marquis of Grana, to occupy what is today known as the Grana-heights. Another force crossed the bridge at Konz and a third force crossed the river over a pontoon bridge. They attacked the French camp and an indecisive battle raged for three hours. Then Otto de Grana engaged his right flank on the right moment and the French fled the battlefield, leaving behind all their guns and wagons. The Germans pursued the French over 50 kilometers.

Créquy made his way into Trier to assume command, but was forced to surrender on 9 September.

On the battlefield a Grana-memorial was erected in 1892 under Wilhelm II, not honouring Otto de Grana, but glorifying unified Germany.

== Sources ==
- Bodart, Gaston (1908). Militär-historisches Kriegs-Lexikon (1618–1905).
