= List of governors of the Habsburg Netherlands =

Coat of arms of the Habsburg Netherlands

The governor (Dutch: landvoogd) or governor-general (gouverneur-generaal) of the Habsburg Netherlands was a representative appointed by the Holy Roman emperor (1504-1556), the king of Spain (1556–1598, 1621–1706), and the archduke of Austria (1716-1794), to administer the Burgundian inheritance of the House of Habsburg in the Low Countries when the monarch was absent from the territory. The role of the governors-general significantly changed over time: initially tutors and advisors of Charles V, Holy Roman Emperor, who lived at the Palace of Coudenberg, they served as generals during the Eighty Years' War between the Kingdom of Spain and the Dutch Republic. Frequently, the governor-general was a close relative of the Austrian or Spanish monarchs, though at other times Spanish or German noblemen filled the role. The governor-general was usually based in Brussels.

== List of governors ==
Picture	Name	Took office	Left office	Relationship to monarch	Appointed by
	Engelbert II of Nassau (1451–1504)	1501	1504	/	Maximilian I, Holy Roman Emperor for Philip the Handsome
	William de Croÿ (1458–1521)	1504	1507	/	Maximilian I for Charles V, Holy Roman Emperor
	Margaret of Austria, Duchess of Savoy (1480–1530)	1507	1 December 1530 (death)	Aunt of Charles V	Maximilian I for Charles V, Holy Roman Emperor
Charles became Duke of Burgundy in 1506 (emancipated in 1515), King of Spain and the Two Sicilies in 1516, Archduke of Austria and Holy Roman Emperor as Charles V in 1519 at the death of Maximilian.
	Mary of Hungary (1505–1558)	January 1531	October 1555	Sister	Charles V, Holy Roman Emperor
	Emmanuel Philibert, Duke of Savoy (1528–1580)	1555	1559	Cousin of Philip	Charles V for his son Philip II of Spain.
In 1556, Philip V, Duke of Burgundy, became king of Spain as Philip II, thereby bringing the Habsburg Netherlands under Spanish control.
	Margaret of Parma (1522–1586)	1559	1567	Half-sister	Philip II of Spain
	Fernando Álvarez de Toledo, 3rd Duke of Alba (1507–1582)	1567	1573	/	Philip II of Spain
	Luis de Requesens y Zúñiga (1528–1576)	1573	5 March 1576 (death)	/	Philip II of Spain
	John of Austria (1547–1578)	1576	1 October 1578 (death)	Half-brother	Philip II of Spain
	Alexander Farnese, Duke of Parma (1545–1592)	1578	3 December 1592 (death)	Half-nephew	Philip II of Spain
	Peter Ernst I von Mansfeld-Vorderort (1517–1604)	1592	1594	/	Philip II of Spain
	Archduke Ernest of Austria (1553–1595)	1594	20 February 1595 (death)	Nephew	Philip II of Spain
	Pedro Henriquez de Acevedo, Count of Fuentes (1525–1610)	1595	1596	/	Philip II of Spain
	Albert VII, Archduke of Austria (1559–1621)	1596	1598	Nephew	Philip II of Spain
In 1598, Philip II of Spain ceded the Netherlands to his daughter Isabella Clara Eugenia and nephew Albert VII, Archduke of Austria, who married the next year. They reigned together until his death, when the Netherlands passed to their nephew, Philip IV of Spain, in whose name Isabella Clara Eugenia governed the countries until her death.
	Isabella Clara Eugenia (1566–1633)	1621	1 December 1633 (death)	Aunt	Philip IV of Spain
	Cardinal-Infante Ferdinand of Austria (1609/1610–1641)	1633	9 November 1641 (death)	Brother	Philip IV of Spain
	Francisco de Melo (1597–1651)	1641	1644	/	Philip IV of Spain
	Manuel de Moura Corte Real, 2nd Marquis of Castelo Rodrigo (1590–1651)	1644	1647	/	Philip IV of Spain
	Archduke Leopold Wilhelm of Austria (1614–1662)	1647	1656	Cousin	Philip IV of Spain
	John Joseph of Austria (1629–1679)	1656	1659	Son	Philip IV of Spain
	Luis de Benavides Carrillo, Marquis of Caracena (1608–1668)	1659	1664	/	Philip IV of Spain
	Francisco de Moura Corte Real, 3rd Marquis of Castelo Rodrigo (1610–1675)	1664	1668	/	Philip IV of Spain
	Francisco de Moura Corte Real, 3rd Marquis of Castelo Rodrigo (1610–1675)	1664	1668	/	Charles II of Spain
	Íñigo Melchor de Velasco, 7th Duke of Frías (1629–1696)	1668	1670	/	Charles II of Spain
	Juan Domingo de Zuñiga y Fonseca (1640–1716)	1670	1675	/	Charles II of Spain
	Carlos de Aragón de Gurrea, 9th Duke of Villahermosa (1634–1692)	1675	1677	/	Charles II of Spain
	Alexander Farnese, Prince of Parma (1635–1689)	1678	1682	Second Cousin	Charles II of Spain
	Ottone Enrico del Caretto, Marquis of Savona (1629–1685)	1682	1685	/	Charles II of Spain
	Francisco Antonio de Agurto, 1st Marquess of Gastañaga (1640–1702)	1685	1692	/	Charles II of Spain
	Maximilian II Emanuel (1662–1726)	1692	1706	Nephew-in-law	Charles II of Spain
	Maximilian II Emanuel (1662–1726)	1692	1706	Uncle	Philip V of Spain
	Isidoro de la Cueva y Benavides (acting) (1652–1723)	1701	1704	During the absence of Maximilian of Bavaria	Philip V of Spain
Following the War of the Spanish Succession, Charles VI, Holy Roman Emperor became ruler of the Austrian Netherlands.
	Prince Eugene of Savoy (1663–1736)	1716	1724	Third cousin	Charles VI, Holy Roman Emperor
	Wirich Philipp von Daun (1669–1741)	February 1725	October 1725	/	Charles VI, Holy Roman Emperor
	Archduchess Maria Elisabeth of Austria (1680–1741)	1725	26 August 1741 (death)	Sister	Charles VI, Holy Roman Emperor
	Archduchess Maria Elisabeth of Austria (1680–1741)	1725	26 August 1741 (death)	Aunt	Maria Theresa
	Friedrich August von Harrach-Rohrau (1696–1749)	1741	1744	/	Maria Theresa
	Archduchess Maria Anna of Austria (1718–1744)	1744	16 December 1744 (death)	Sister	Maria Theresa
	Prince Charles Alexander of Lorraine (1712–1780)	1744	4 July 1780 (death)	Brother-in-law	Maria Theresa
	Maria Christina, Duchess of Teschen (1742–1798) with Albert Casimir, Duke of Teschen (1738–1822)	1781	1793	Sister and brother-in-law	Joseph II, Holy Roman Emperor
	Maria Christina, Duchess of Teschen (1742–1798) with Albert Casimir, Duke of Teschen (1738–1822)	1781	1793	Sister and brother-in-law	Leopold II, Holy Roman Emperor
	Maria Christina, Duchess of Teschen (1742–1798) with Albert Casimir, Duke of Teschen (1738–1822)	1781	1793	Aunt and uncle	Francis II, Holy Roman Emperor
	Archduke Charles, Duke of Teschen (1771–1847)	1793	1794	Brother	Francis II, Holy Roman Emperor

Thereafter, the French revolutionaries occupied the Low Countries until 1815. The Emperor formally recognised the loss of these territories by the Treaty of Lunéville of 1801. At the Congress of Vienna, in 1815, the Low Countries were re-united in a personal union under the House of Orange-Nassau. In 1830, Belgium declared its independence.

== See also ==
- Lord Chamberlain of the Archduchess
- List of plenipotentiaries of Austrian Netherlands
- List of rulers of the Netherlands
