= Siege of Freiburg (1677) =

1677 siege

Coordinates: 47°59′47″N 7°50′58″E

- Part of the Franco-Dutch War
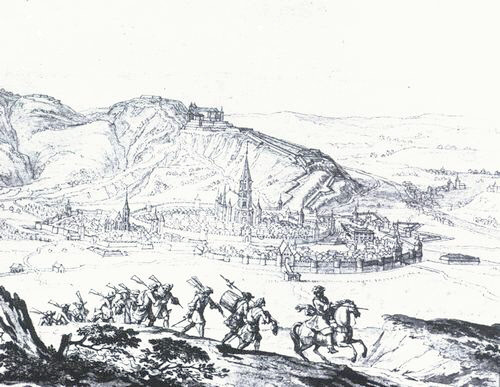
Date	9 – 16 November 1677
Location	Freiburg im Breisgau, present-day Baden-Württemberg (Germany)
Result	French victory

Belligerents
France	Holy Roman Empire

Commanders and leaders
(Kingdom of France) François de Créquy	(Duchy of Lorraine) Charles of Lorraine (Holy Roman Empire) Georg von Schütz zu Purschütz

Strength
20,000	2,800

Casualties and losses
1,000	200

The siege of Freiburg took place between 9 and 16 November 1677, as part of the Franco-Dutch War, and ended with the conquest of the city by the French.

== Prelude ==
Towards the end of 1677 the warring factions withdrew to their winter quarters as usual. But French Marshal François de Créquy wrote to his King in Paris that he saw a good opportunity to take Freiburg and Louis XIV agreed to a winter action. On 8 November, Créquy surprisingly crossed the Rhine with his troops near Breisach, marched in the direction of Freiburg and reached the city by 8 AM on 9 November.

The commander-in-chief of the Imperial Army, Charles of Lorraine, quickly tried to remobilize his units, but it took a long time to get his scattered troops to the Breisgau over generally poor roads, and some contingents of the imperial districts could not be persuaded to continue the campaign of 1677.

== Siege ==
On 10 November, Créquy began shelling the suburb of Neuburg with artillery. At the same time Meinhardt Schomberg attacked the Freiburg Charterhouse towards the Schlossberg. During the night of 10/11 November, Colonel Kaunitz made a sally to disrupt the French in digging the trenches. On 11 November, Freiburg experienced a heavy cannonade, although the damage was limited. Kaunitz made another sortie to break up the enclosure and send messengers to the Duke of Lorraine. After the French artillery under the Marquis de Freselières had shot a breach of more than 30 meters wide in the city wall of Neuburg on 12 November, Créquy called on Freiburg to surrender. City commander Schütz refused because his officers advised against it. From 12/13 November, the French pushed the trenches further and widened the breach.
At 4 PM on 14 November, Schütz gave up the suburbs, although the French had not yet begun to storm the breach in the fortifications. The French occupied the suburbs and Créquy again called for surrender. Schütz seemed completely unable to act, which is why the Austrian government asked Count Portia to take over the command, but he refused. Meanwhile, the French were able to prepare undisturbed during the night their positions for the shelling of the inner ring of Freiburg's walls .

On 15 November, the French prepared to storm the Christopher Gate. At the same time, they managed to storm the ramparts on the Schlossberg and capture the fortifications on Karlseck. This enabled them to shoot at the defenders from above, and so Créquy had cannons brought to the highest point of the Schlossberg for an even more successful bombardment of the city. Later that day, the French made a breach in the Christopher Gate and the city commander signaled to the French that he wished to enter into surrender negotiations, after which a ceasefire ensued.

Créquy insisted that the town and castle had to be handed over by 8 AM on 16 November. After dark, gun fire was heard in Freiburg from the stronghold near Emmendingen, announcing the arrival of relief troops. During the night, messengers came from Hermann of Baden-Baden, who was approaching with an Imperial corps and who promised to be at Freiburg by the evening, at the latest.

As a consequence confusion reigned in Freiburg due to the disagreement between the city councillors, the Austrian government and the officers. But the city commander, Schütz, was determined to surrender and on 16 November, before 8 AM, the document of surrender was signed. The Austrian garrison was allowed to withdraw to Rheinfelden with their arms, while the French guaranteed life and property to the citizens. Irrespective of this, imperial and French troops plundered Freiburg. The withdrawal of the imperial units began at 1 PM. The main part of the French Army only moved into the city on 17 November.

== Consequences ==
When Charles of Lorraine heard of Freiburg's capitulation, he arranged for the arrest of the city commander, Schütz. Court-martialed in Vienna, he was acquitted, despite numerous indications that Schütz and possibly also members of the local nobility had worked into the hands of the French. Louis XIV was known for buying or blackmailing foreign princes and their officials. General Schütz's acquittal was attributed to the influence of the Freiburg-born Viennese court chancellor, Johann Paul Hocher, who was related to Schütz.

In France, the capture of Freiburg was celebrated as a great victory and a commemorative coin was minted for this event.
The French converted the city into a fortress by Vauban, for which several suburbs were demolished.
In the Peace of Nijmegen, the Habsburgs gave up Freiburg, which remained French until 1698.

== Sources ==
- F. L. Dammert: Freiburg in der zweiten Hälfte des XVII. Jahrhunderts. VI. Wie die Stadt Freiburg französisch wurde. In: Zeitschrift der Gesellschaft für Beförderung der Geschichts-, Altertums- und Volkskunde, 6. Band, Freiburg im Breisgau 1887, pages 3–157 Digitalised by UB Freiburg
- F. L. Dammert: Bericht des Ratschreibers D. Franz Karl Vogel über die Belagerung und Übergabe der Stadt Freiburg im November 1677. In: Zeitschrift der Gesellschaft für Beförderung der Geschichts-, Altertums- und Volkskunde, 6. Band, Freiburg im Breisgau 1887, pages 379–393 Digitalised by UB Freiburg
