= Mr. Limberham; or, the Kind Keeper =

Restoration comedy by John Dryden

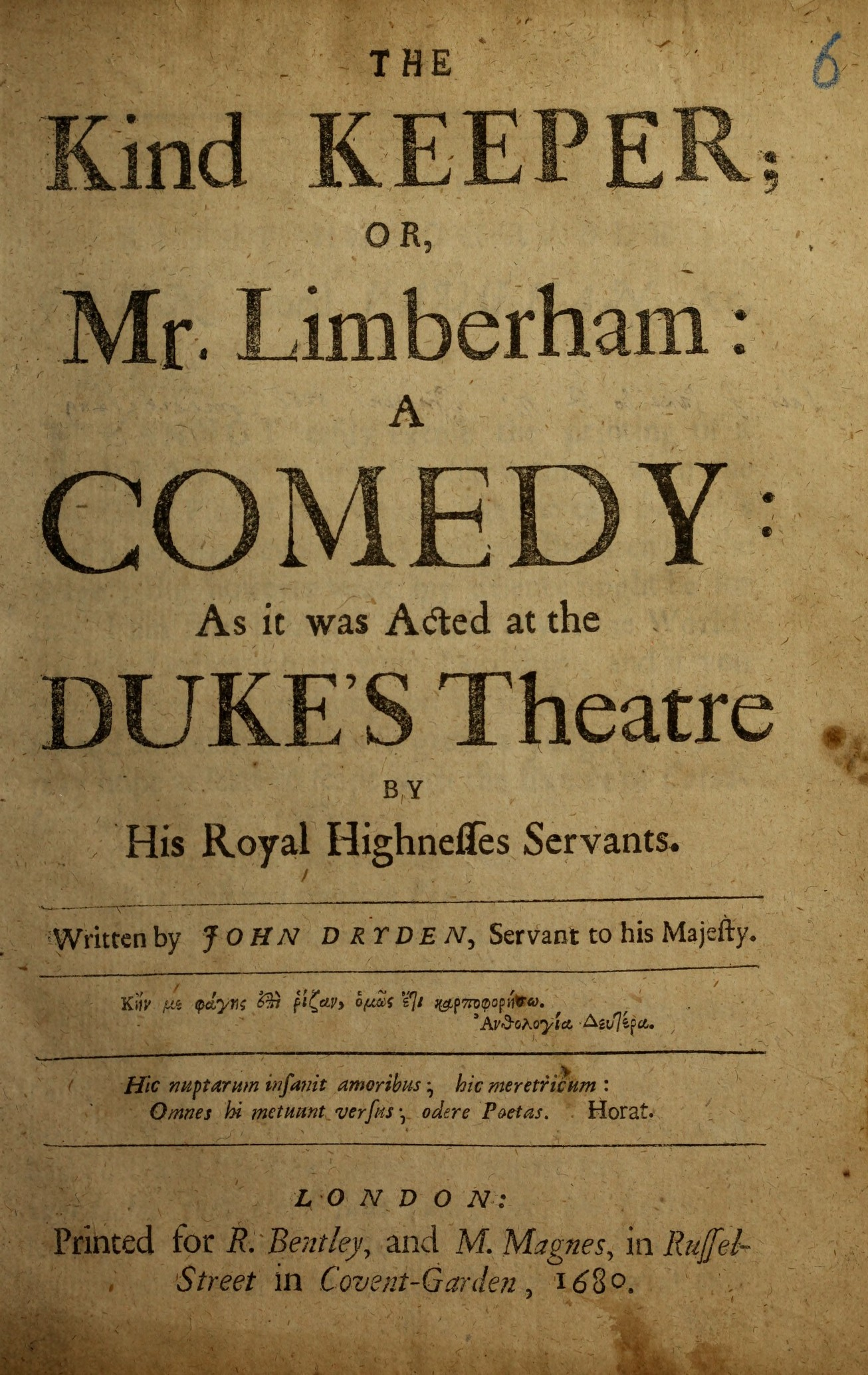
- Title page of the first edition (1680)
- Written by: John Dryden
- Original language: English
- Genre: Comedy, farce
- Setting: A house in London

Premiere
- Date premiered: 11 March 1678
- Place premiered: London

Mr. Limberham; or, the Kind Keeper was written by John Dryden in 1677, shortly after completing his best known work All for Love. First performed on 11 March 1678, 'The Kind Keeper' closed after only three performances and has been described as 'his most abject failure.' Dryden later removed 'objectionable material' from the original, before submitting the manuscript for publication. The first edition was published in 1680.

== Summary ==
Dryden's play bears significant parallels to his friend George Etherege's 1676 production The Man of Mode; both feature a man whose sexual attraction is so great (Woodall), that an intelligent and moral woman (Ms Pleasance) is willing to engage in an affair with him. He mentions working on the play in a letter dated October 1677, while a number of references, including one to the French general François de Créquy, date his revisions to 1679.

The terms 'Mistress' and 'Keeper' implied a sexual relationship between an unmarried woman, the Mistress, and her male lover or 'Keeper', who supports her financially. Society at the time made a clear distinction between kept mistresses and prostitutes, several of whom appear as minor characters in the play; in Annus Mirabilis, Dryden suggested Charles II's multiple mistresses demonstrated his generosity of spirit, rather than immorality. The main characters include:

- Mr Woodall: a young, wealthy and amoral aristocrat
- Ms Judith: unmarried, servant of Mrs. Brainsick, seduced by Woodall
- Mrs. Brainsick: married to Mr. Brainsick, seduced by Woodall
- Ms Tricksy: Limberham's 'Mistress', who is seduced by Woodall
- Mr Limberham: Ms. Tricksy's 'Keeper', whom he later marries
- Ms Saintly: a widow, agrees to be seduced by Woodall who asks Gervase to stand in for him so he can sleep with Ms Pleasance
- Mr Gervase: Woodall's servant, who takes his place with Ms Saintly and marries her
- Ms Pleasance: Woodall's prospective bride (unknown to both of them) but who is willing to be seduced by him
- Mr Brainsick: husband to Mrs Brainsick, who remains unaware of her affair with Woodall
- Mr Aldo: a widower, who discovers he is Woodall's father

Woodall first seduces the maidservant Judith, followed by Ms Tricksy, then Mrs. Brainsick; he asks his servant Gervase to take his place with Ms Saintly, a widow and is about to bed Ms Pleasance when he discovers she is his intended bride. While the female characters are all aware of each other's relationships with Woodall, the men are not, with the exception of Aldo; he supports Woodall in his seductions, arguing that he did the same when young and later discovers he is Woodall's father.

At the end of the play, a series of marriages are agreed; Woodall to Ms Pleasance, Gervase to Ms Saintly and Limberham to Tricksy, while Brainsick is happily unaware that his wife was seduced. It finishes with Woodall telling the audience to find a woman who can be both a "wife and mistress".

== Themes ==
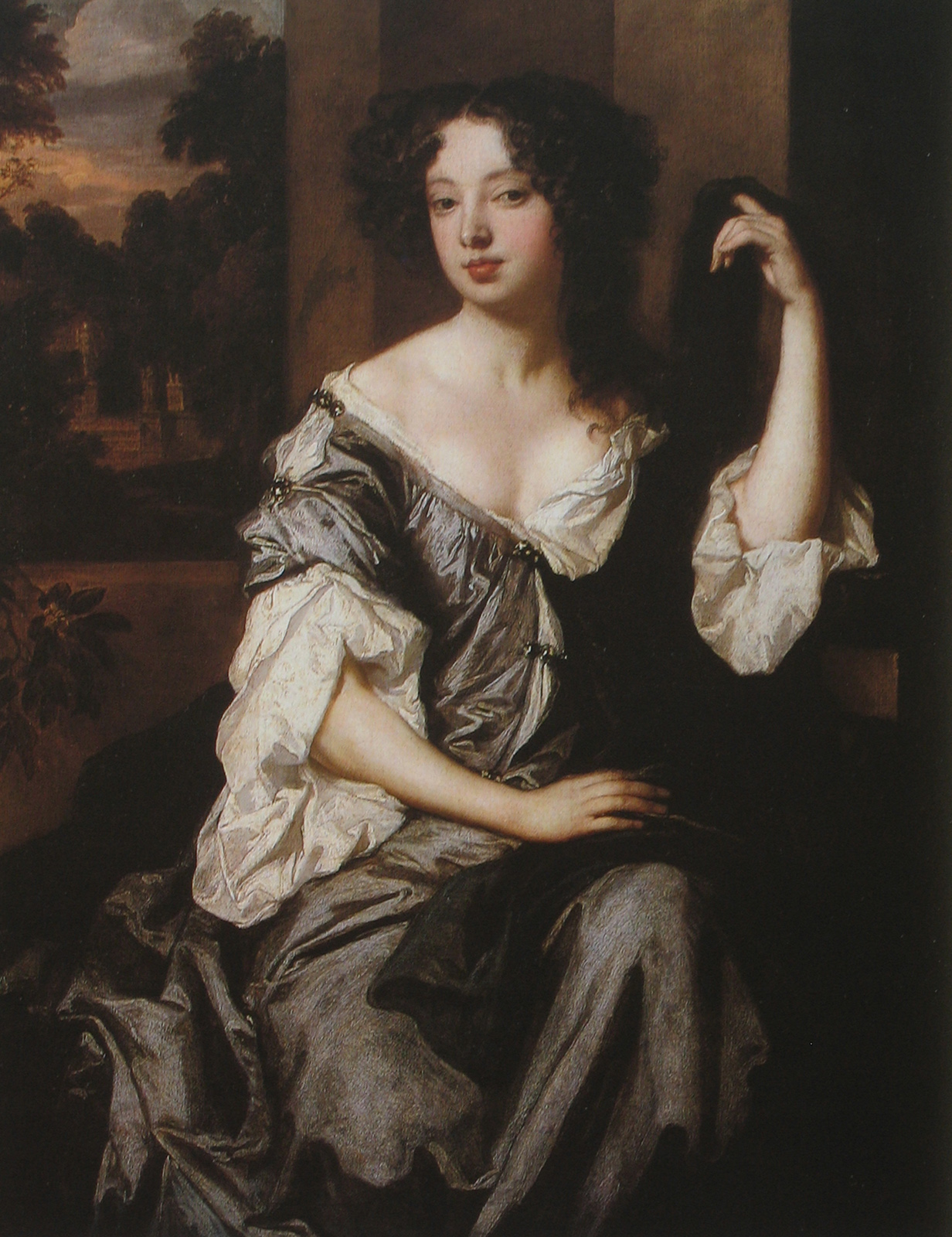
Louise, Duchess of Portsmouth and mistress of Charles II; Dryden hinted the play failed in part due to her objections

Dryden later claimed the play failed because it satirised the sin of 'keeping' too well and hinted it was 'stopped' due to objections from James, Duke of York and Charles' current mistress, the French Catholic Duchess of Portsmouth; in 1680, the Lord Chamberlain reportedly shut down The Female Prelate at her request.

Feminist Theory One theme is the limited control women have over their lives; without their own income, this is true even for wealthy or 'kept' women such as Mrs Brainsick or Ms Tricksy, while the money earned by servants and prostitutes goes to maintain their families. However, they can choose whom to have an affair with, a point emphasised by the fact that unlike the male characters, all the women are aware of Woodall's activities.

Materialist Theory Linked to this is the secondary theme of materialism and the importance placed by society on possessions; a chest of jewels briefly appears as one of the characters, which is stolen by a thief. The play's female characters exchange sexual favours (or 'jewels') for material reward, either explicitly, as with Tricksy and Limberham, or implicitly, with Woodall and Pleasance.

Other critics argue it follows a pattern common to other plays of this period; first promiscuity, then revulsion, finally conversion.

== Revisions ==
The play was so poorly received Dryden removed 'objectionable material' from it before publication; some of these changes can be tracked since an original copy of the text ended up in the library of Alexander Pope (1688-1744). They include jokes that were either dated or gave offence; in the original, one of the characters, a second generation prostitute, is referred to as 'Very punk (ie prostitute) of very punk,' a paraphrase of the Nicene Creed.

== Sources ==
- Dearing, Vinton (Commentary), Roper, Alan (Commentary) (1992). The Works of John Dryden; Volume XIV (2013 ed.). Hardpress. pp. 365–366. ISBN 978-1314579512.
- Dryden, John. "Annus Mirabilis". Archived from the original on 10 April 2012.
- Fortier, Mark (2002). Theory/Theatre: An Introduction. Routledge. ISBN 978-0415254373.
- Schneider, Ben Ross (1971). Ethos of Restoration Comedy. University of Illinois. ISBN 978-0252001512.
