= Carlos de Aragón de Gurrea, 9th Duke of Villahermosa =

Spanish nobleman, viceroy and governor

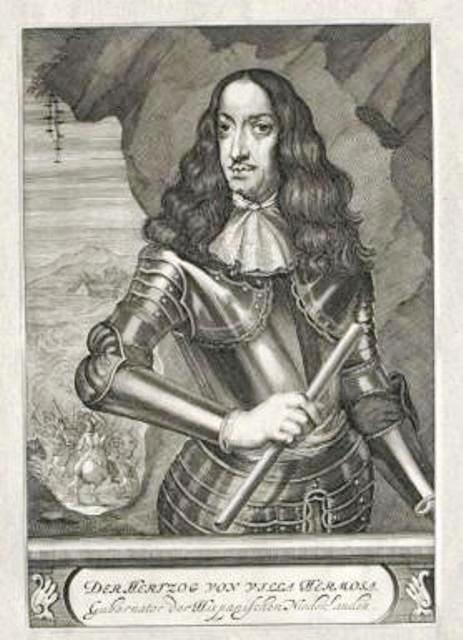
Carlos de Aragón de Gurrea y de Borja

Carlos de Aragón de Gurrea y de Borja, 9th Duke of Villahermosa (18 August 1634 – 14 April 1692) was a Spanish nobleman, viceroy and governor.

He was Governor of the Habsburg Netherlands between 1675 and 1677. During his reign Spanish authority over the Southern Netherlands was nominal. France and the Dutch Republic could fight the Battle of Cassel (1677) on its territory without any significant Spanish contribution, yet Spain did regain Ath and Charleroi with him as Governor in the War.

Around 1677, he received as reinforcements from the Spanish Governor of the Duchy of Milan, Gaspar Téllez-Girón, 5th Duke of Osuna, the military Tercio of Valladares commanded by Field Marshal Isidoro de la Cueva y Benavides.

Shortly after, he was replaced by Alessandro Farnese, Prince of Parma, who became Governor of the Habsburg Netherlands from 1678 until 1682.

Under his rule, the Brussels Military Academy (Royal and Military Academy of the Low Countries Army), was established; reinforced and directed by Sebastián Fernández de Medrano, who had among his students Flemish engineers as efficient as Prospero Jorge de Verboom.

In 1678, Carlos de Gurrea Aragon y Borja became a knight in the Order of the Golden Fleece.

He was appointed Viceroy of Catalonia between 1688 and 1690, dying two years later.

He had married in 1656 with Maria Enriquez de Guzman y Cordova (died 1695). They had no children.

Government offices
Preceded by Juan Domingo de Zuñiga y Fonseca	Governor of the Spanish Netherlands; 1675–1677	Succeeded by Alexander Farnese, Prince of Parma
Preceded by Juan Tomas Enriquez de Cabrera, 7th Duke of Medina de Rioseco	Viceroy of Catalonia; 1688–1690	Succeeded by Juan Claros Pérez de Guzmán, 11th Duke of Medina Sidonia
Spanish nobility
Preceded by Fernando Manuel de Aragon	Duke of Villahermosa	Succeeded by José Claudio de Aragón
