= Corsican Guard Affair =

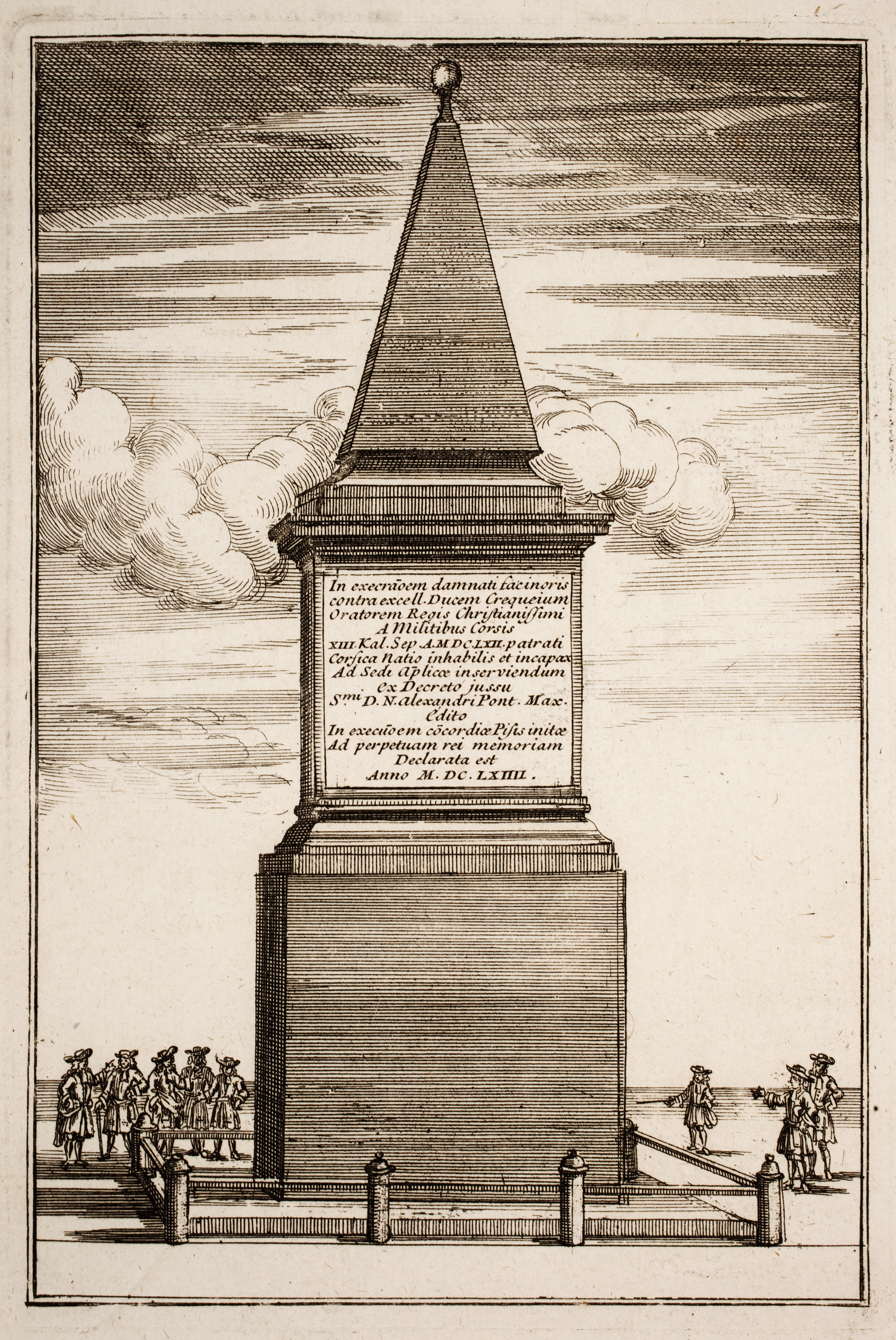
Monument in Rome at the location of the shooting of the French ambassador Charles III de Créquy by Pope Alexander's Corsican guards. Erected 1664, demolished 1668.

The Corsican Guard Affair in 1662 took place when the Papal Corsican Guard fired on the French ambassador's coach, leading to a two-year break in diplomatic relations between France and the Papacy and an eventual dissolution of the Corsican Guard. It was an example of Louis XIV of France's aggressive foreign policy.

== Background ==
The end of the Corsican Guard, triggered by an incident that occurred in Rome on August 20, 1662, gives an insight into the evolution of the geopolitical situation in Europe and on the growing French influence in Italy. Toward the middle of the 17th century, the presence in Rome of numerous diplomatic missions of the European states ended up creating a paradoxical situation in which the major powers – through over-extension of the concept of extraterritoriality, the so-called "liberty of quarters" – had in some cases provided their embassies with real military garrisons (whose soldiers were free to bear weapons throughout the city), leading to the transformation of entire areas of the city center into free zones, where criminals and killers could find refuge, untouchable by the law.

Pope Alexander VII Chigi (r. 1655–67) tried to limit these excesses and was soon satisfied by the actions of both Spain and the Holy Roman Empire. In contrast, Louis XIV of France (r. 1643–1715), who was hostile to the Pope, sent to Rome his cousin Charles III, Duke of Créqui, as Extraordinary Ambassador together with a reinforced military escort, in order to antagonize the Roman court and the Pope's family. The ambassador's task was apparently to sabotage the pope's effort to create an anti-Ottoman alliance. Regarding the liberty of quarters issue, Créqui demanded that the pope extend it well behind the limit of Palazzo Farnese, including via Giulia, which was part of the way along which the Corsican soldiers had to walk each day in order to reach the Carceri Nuove (the state prison) from their barracks at the Trinità dei Pellegrini. The commander of the Guard, Don Mario Chigi, reacted to that by ordering 150 soldiers to patrol the streets of Rome.

== Build up ==
Corsican guards had previously arrested a criminal in the gardens of cardinal Rinaldo d'Este's villa on the orders of Alexander's nephew cardinal Flavio Chigi. D'Este was very angry and appealed to foreign ministers to end arbitration. Charles III de Créquy was sent to Rome by Louis as ambassador extraordinary to put an end to the conflict between the cardinal and the papal guards and so he was accompanied by several soldiers.

The situation broke down when the duke's soldiers passed through a tobacco shop and reviled two Corsican guards in a Roman cabaret. The perpetrators were punished, but this did not satisfy Alexander or his guards, with the latter wanting to avenge the affront, leading to the incident on 20 August 1662. Pope Alexander VII did not react to the incident and Louis ordered the duke to leave Rome and summoned the papal nuncio to Paris - in effect, a breaking-off of diplomatic relations - while the parlement d'Aix decided that France should annex the papal possessions in Avignon.

== The Incident ==
On 20 August 1662, soldiers of the Corsican Guard gathered outside the Palazzo Farnese, the French ambassador's residence. The insults escalated into gunfire with shots fired at the ambassador's coach. This left several dead and wounded including one of the ambassador's pages.

== The Aftermath ==
On 12 February 1664 agreement was reached in the Treaty of Pisa. The governor of Rome was forced to come to Paris to explain the incident, the Corsican guard was dissolved and a pyramid built in Rome to mark the site of the incident. The papal legate, cardinal Chigi, appeared before Louis on 29 July 1664 and publicly apologised for the incident, on which France returned Avignon to the pope.

The incident was commemorated by a tapestry now on show at the château de Fontainebleau, a section of the ceiling of the Hall of Mirrors in Versailles, and a bronze medallion from a side lantern of the Louis XIV Victory Monument which is now kept at the Louvre.

== Sources ==
- Paita, Almo (1998). La vita quotidiana a Roma ai tempi di Gian Lorenzo Bernini (in Italian). Milan: Rizzoli. ISBN 8817172308.
