= Íñigo Melchor de Velasco, 7th Duke of Frías =

Spanish nobleman

The Most Excellent The Duke of Frías GE KOS
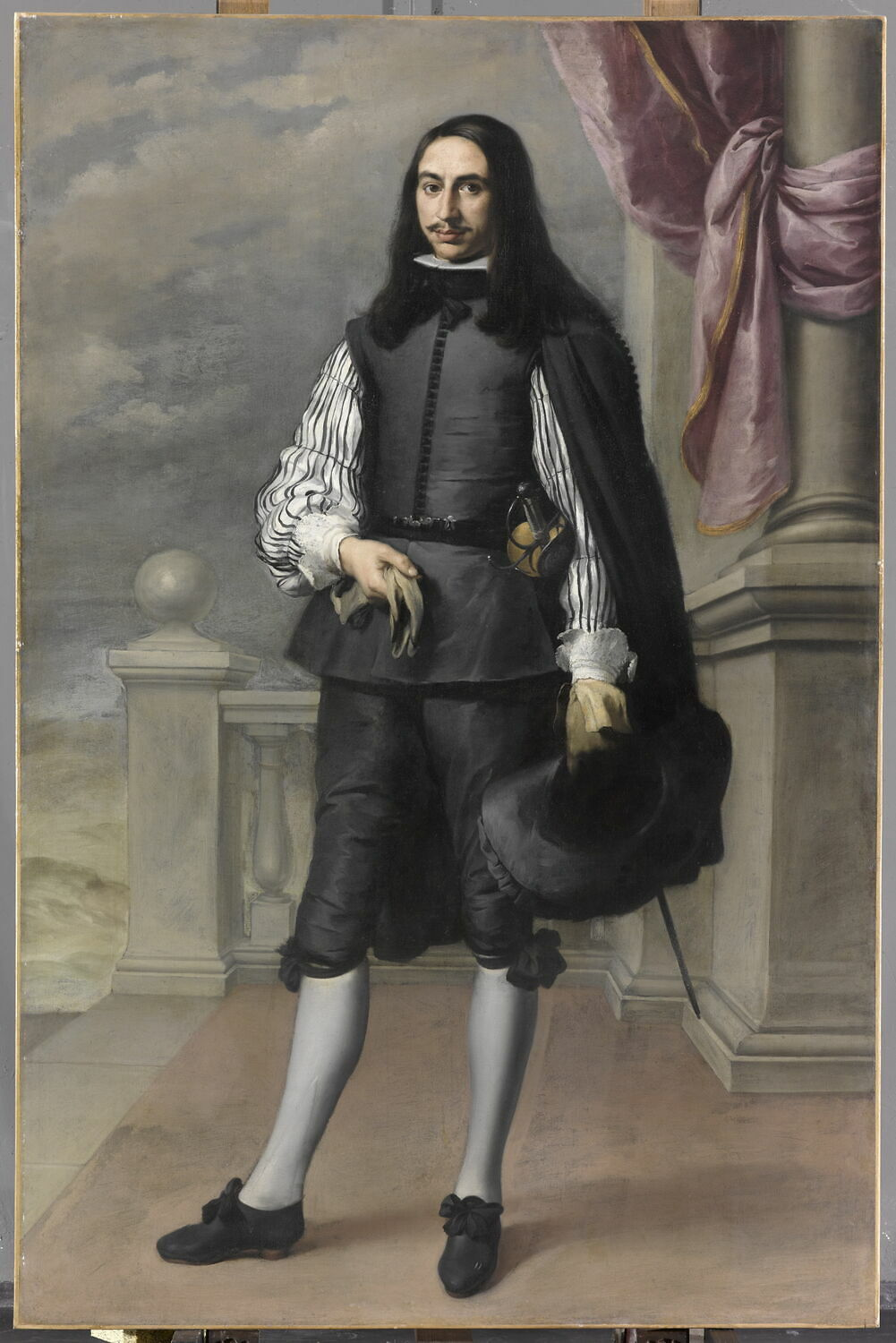
- Íñigo Melchor de Velasco (c.1658); Bartolomé Esteban Murillo

Governor-General of the Spanish Netherlands
- In office 1668–1670
- Monarch: Charles II
- Preceded by: The Marquis of Castel Rodrigo
- Succeeded by: Juan Domingo de Zuñiga

Personal details
- Born: 16 April 1629
- Died: 27 September 1696 (aged 67) Spain
- Spouse: María Teresa de Benavídes

Íñigo Melchor Fernández de Velasco, 7th Duke of Frías, GE, KOS (16 April 1629 – 27 September 1696), was a Spanish nobleman and Governor-General of the Spanish Netherlands.

== Biography ==
His father was Bernardino Fernández de Velasco, 6th Duke of Frías and his mother was Isabel Maria de Guzmán. King John IV of Portugal was his cousin.

He was a very influential political figure during the reign of Carlos II of Spain. He inherited the title of Constable of Castile from his father, was a member of both the State council and the War Council, Governor of Galicia, and became Governor of the Spanish Netherlands between 1668 and 1670. In 1676 he was appointed as Mayordomo mayor to the King, chief of his Household.

His painting by Murillo from 1659 can be seen in the Louvre.

=== Marriage and children ===
He married twice: first to Josefa Fernández de Córdoba and then to Maria Teresa de Benavídes Dávila y Corella, daughter of Diego de Benavides, 8th Count of Santisteban. They had one daughter :

- María Remigia, VII Marquesa de Berlanga (c. 1678 to 1734), married to Francisco Téllez-Girón, 6th Duke of Osuna.

He also had an illegitimate son :

- Francisco Fernández de Velasco y Tovar, marquis of Carvajal (1646–1716), Viceroy of Catalonia.

After his death in 1696, the title of Duke of Frías went to his nephew José Fernández de Velasco, 8th Duke of Frías (circa 1665 – 1704).

== Additional information ==
=== Sources ===
- Castro Pereira Mouzinho de Albuquerque e Cunha, Fernando de (1995). Instrumentário Genealógico - Linhagens Milenárias (in Portuguese). pp. 329–30.
- Instituto de Salazar y Castro. Elenco de Grandezas y Titulos Nobiliarios Españoles (in Spanish). periodic publication.
- "Genealogia" (in Portuguese). Archived from the original on March 8, 2007.
- "María Teresa de Benavides Dávila y Corella (in Spanish)". Fundacion Medinaceli.

Government offices
Preceded by The Marquis of Castel Rodrigo	Governor-General of the Spanish Netherlands; 1668–1670	Succeeded by Juan Domingo de Zuñiga
Military offices
Preceded by Bernardino; Fernández de Velasco	Constable of Castile; 1652–1696	Succeeded by José; Fernández de Velasco
Spanish nobility
Preceded by Bernardino; Fernández de Velasco	Duke of Frías; 1652–1696	Succeeded by José; Fernández de Velasco
