= Alexander Farnese, Prince of Parma =

Italian general and official (1635–1689)

Alexander Farnese
- Prince of Parma
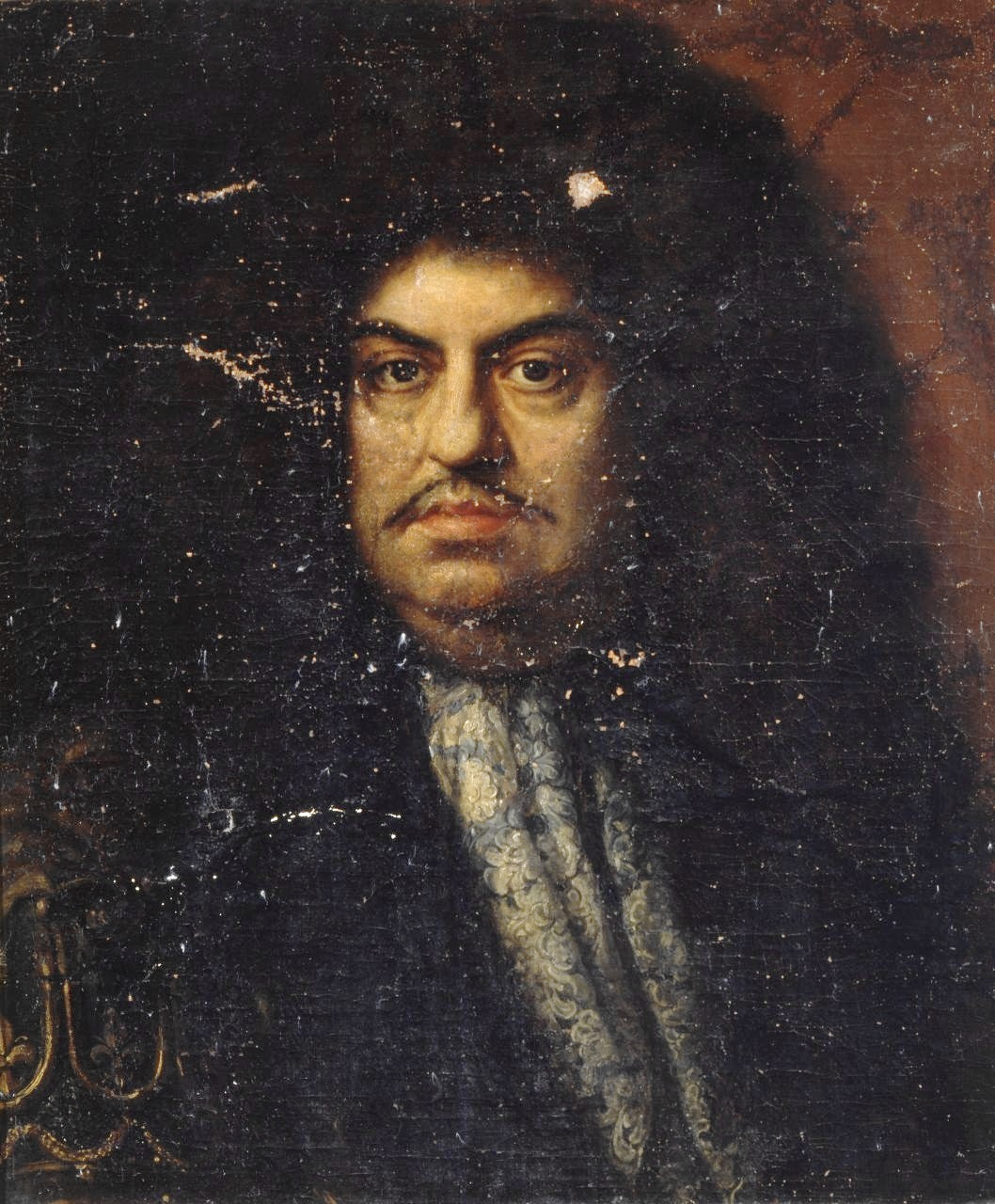

Viceroy of Navarre
- In office 15 April 1671 – 17 May 1676
- Monarch: Charles II
- Regent: Mariana of Austria
- Preceded by: Diego Caballero de Illescas y Cabeza de Vaca
- Succeeded by: Esteban Fermín de Marichalar y Eslava (as acting)

Viceroy of Catalonia
- In office 7 August 1676 – 9 July 1677
- Monarch: Charles II
- Preceded by: Juan Antonio Pacheco Osorio Toledo
- Succeeded by: Juan Domingo de Zuñiga y Fonseca

Governor-General of the Spanish Netherlands
- In office November 1678 – April 1682
- Monarch: Charles II
- Chief Minister: John Joseph of Austria; Juan Francisco de la Cerda, 8th Duke of Medinaceli
- Preceded by: Carlos de Aragón de Gurrea, 9th Duke of Villahermosa
- Succeeded by: Ottone Enrico del Caretto, Marquis of Savona
- Born: 10 January 1635; Parma, Duchy of Parma and Piacenza
- Died: 18 February 1689 (aged 54); Madrid, Spanish Empire
- Spouse: Maria de Lao y Carillo
- Issue: Alessandro Odoardo; Alessandro Maria; Margherita; Isabella
Names
- Alessandro di Odoardo
- House: Farnese
- Father: Odoardo Farnese, Duke of Parma
- Mother: Margherita de' Medici

Military service
- Allegiance: Republic of Venice; Spanish Empire
- Branch/service: Venetian Army; Spanish Navy
- Years of service: 1656–1682
- Rank: (Spanish Empire) Admiral (Republic of Venice) General
- Battles/wars: Cretan War (1645–1669)

Alessandro Farnese (10 January 1635 – 18 February 1689) was an Italian military leader who was governor of the Habsburg Netherlands from 1678 to 1682.

He is not to be confused with his better-known great-grandfather Alexander Farnese, Duke of Parma. This Alessandro was often called Alessandro di Odoardo (son of Odoardo). His elder brother Ranuccio II was the sixth duke of Parma and Piacenza .

== Biography ==
He was born in Parma, the second son of Odoardo Farnese, fifth duke of Parma, and Margherita de' Medici.

He was general in the army of Venice, fighting the Turks, and later admiral in the Spanish Navy. He became governor of the Southern Netherlands after the Franco-Dutch War.

Alexander died in Madrid in 1689.

== Family ==
By his mistress Maria de Lao y Carillo had the following children:

- Alessandro Odoardo (Badajoz, 12 April 1663 – Cacéres, 21 May 1666)
- Alessandro Maria (Badajoz, 30 October 1664 – 28 September 1726), Colonel in Spanish army
- Margherita (Badajoz, 5 June 1665 – Parma, November 1718), nun in Parma
- Isabella (Badajoz, 19 September 1666 – Parma, 27 December 1741), nun in Parma

Preceded by Carlos de Gurrea, Duke of Villahermosa	Governor of the Spanish Netherlands; 1678–1682	Succeeded by Otto Henry, Marquis of Caretto
