= Couvent des Jacobins de la rue Saint-Honoré =

Dominican monastery used by Jacobin Club

Coordinates: 48.867°N 2.332°E

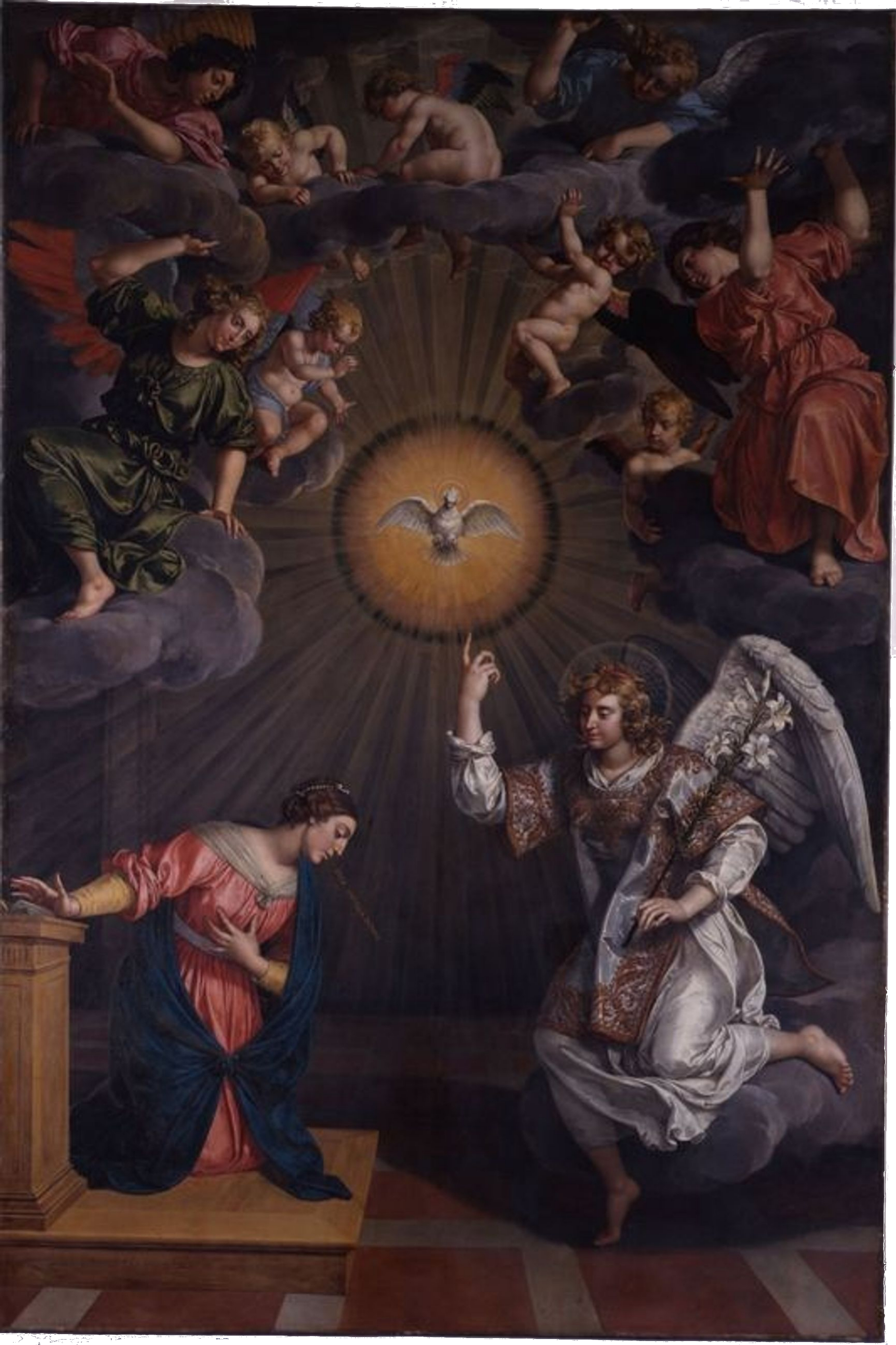
The Annunciation by Frans Pourbus the Younger, originally the altarpiece in the priory church

The Couvent des Jacobins de la rue Saint-Honoré or Couvent de l'Annonciation was a Dominican priory on rue Saint-Honoré in Paris. It was on the site of what is now Place du Marché-Saint-Honoré. It is notable as the meeting place of what became known as the Jacobin Club, during the French Revolution.

== History ==
The convent was founded in 1611 as Couvent de l'Annonciation by Father Sébastien Michaëlis, who had won permission from Louis XIII and his regent Marie de Medici to found a new monastery in Paris, despite opposition from the Chapter General of Michaëlis' order, the Dominicans. Thanks to active support from Henri de Gondi, bishop of Paris, who donated 50,000 livres to the project, the order was able to build the new monastery. Its library was founded in 1613 – by 1787 it was claimed to have 32,000 printed books and 132 original manuscripts.

The monastery was suppressed in 1790 and the library confiscated and moved to a depot in the former couvent des Capucins Saint-Honoré. The Couvent des Jacobins was thus rented to "the Friends of the Constitution", which became popularly known as the Jacobin Club. The Club closed in 1794 and the buildings were demolished in 1806.
