= French ship Lys (1671) =

Ship of the line of the French Navy

History

France
- Name: Lys
- Namesake: Fleur de Lys
- Builder: Toulon
- Laid down: September 1667
- Launched: 16 February 1669
- In service: 22 May 1670
- Stricken: 1691
- Fate: Broken up 1689

General characteristics
- Tonnage: 1,700
- Length: 46 m (150 ft 11 in)
- Beam: 12.9 m (42 ft 4 in)
- Draught: 6.5 m (21 ft 4 in)
- Complement: 450 to 500
- Armament: 70 guns

Lys was a 70-gun three-decker ship of the line of the French Navy, designed by Audibert. She was the first ship of the line to feature suspended lamps instead of candles for lighting.

As Ile de France, she was commissioned under Captain Bellisle to wage war against the Barbary corsairs. She was renamed Lys on 24 June 1671 as part of reforms laid down by the First Minister of State Jean-Baptiste Colbert. She took part in operations off Tripoli under Captain de La Fayette. In 1672, along with Dauphin, Juste and Reine, she battled corsairs from Algiers at the entrance of Rhône, destroying two of them. She was part of Abraham Duquesne's squadron in operations off Sicily. She took part in the Battle of Stromboli under Lieutenant-Général Marquis Guillaume d'Alméras, and in the Battle of Augusta, where she led the vanguard of the French fleet. She was in the rear-guard at the Battle of Palermo. She was eventually broken up in 1689.
