= Gerard Callenburgh =

Dutch States Navy officer (1642–1722)

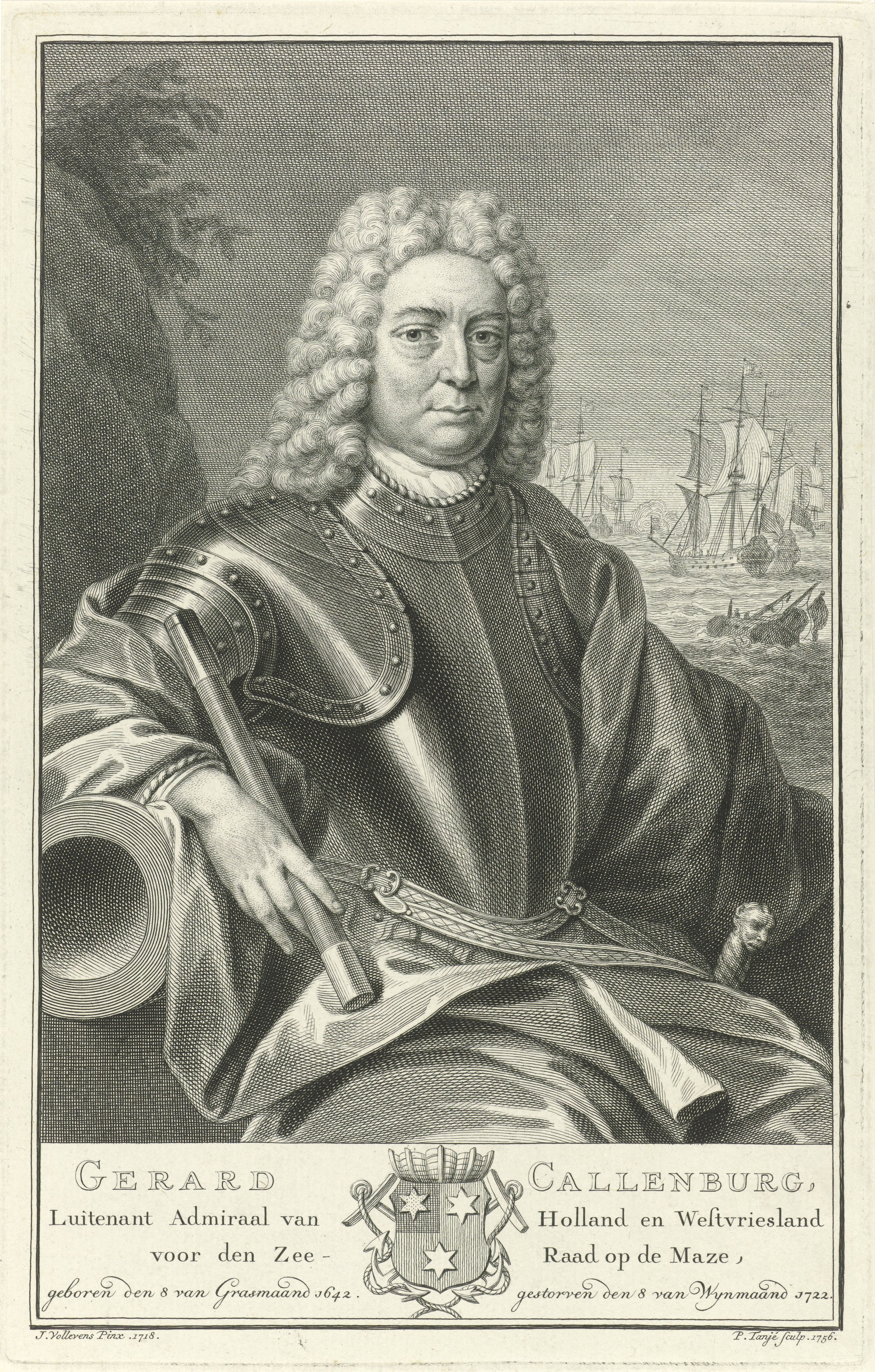
- Portrait of Callenburgh
- Born: 6 December 1642; Willemstad, Dutch Republic
- Died: 8 October 1722 (aged 79) Vlaardingen, Dutch Republic
- Allegiance: Dutch Republic
- Service: Navy
- Service years: 1661 to 1711
- Rank: Admiral
- Wars: Franco-Dutch War; Battle of Solebay; Battle of Texel; Invasion of Martinique; Battle of Stromboli; Battle of Augusta; Battle of Palermo; Nine Years' War; Glorious Revolution; Battle of Beachy Head; Battles of Barfleur and La Hougue; Action at Barfleur; War of the Spanish Succession; Battle of Cádiz; Battle of Vigo Bay; Landing at Barcelona; Capture of Gibraltar; Battle of Málaga
- Other work: Member of the vroedschap of Vlaardingen from 1678 to 1711

Gerard Callenburgh (6 December 1642 – 8 October 1722) was a Dutch States Navy officer.

Gerard was born in Willemstad, the son of a wood-trader, but chose to enter the Dutch navy in 1661 as a cadet, serving the Admiralty of the Maze. He was made second lieutenant in May 1666 during the Second Anglo-Dutch War. On 10 February 1671 he was promoted lieutenant. During the Third Anglo-Dutch War he served on Michiel de Ruyter's flagship, De Zeven Provinciën, in the Battle of Solebay. He was promoted to extraordinary captain on 15 March 1673, serving as second flagcaptain of De Zeven Provinciën in the Battle of Texel, below captain Pieter de Liefde. On 13 February 1674 he was made a full captain.

In 1676 he commanded the Eendragt, the flagship of De Ruyter in the Mediterranean. When De Ruyter was killed, he became acting Vice-Admiral as squadron leader of the van, bringing home the body of the Admiral.

In 1688 he was captain of the Maagd van Dordrecht in the invasion fleet of William III of Orange during the Glorious Revolution. Having excellent relations with the stadtholder he became Vice-Admiral of the Admiralty of the Northern Quarter on 16 April 1689. In 1690 he fought in the Battle of Beachy Head on the West-Friesland. On 18 April 1692 he returned to the Admiralty of de Maze in Rotterdam, using the new and fourth De Zeven Provinciën as flagship. However, on 20 November 1697 he again was relocated to the Admiralty of the Northern Quarter to be its Lieutenant-Admiral.

He achieved his greatest fame during the War of Spanish Succession. In 1702, the Beschermer (90 cannon) was his flagship in the Battle of Vigo Bay. In 1704 he participated in the Anglo-Dutch invasion of Gibraltar, and helped in its defense in the Battle of Vélez-Málaga as commander of the Rear Division, when his flagship was the Graaf van Albemarle (64). On 14 February 1709 he was relocated to the Admiralty of Amsterdam; on 19 February 1711 his last assignment was with his old Admiralty of the Maas, making him supreme operational commander of the Dutch fleet, though he never fought in that capacity. Such changes, very rare in the earlier 17th century, now became common as centralisation grew and provincial loyalty and strife diminished.

From 1678 to 1711 Callenburgh was a member of the vroedschap (town council) of Vlaardingen and often was chosen to be one of the burgomasters for a period of time. He died in Vlaardingen.

== Legacy ==
A Dutch type of destroyers was named after him: the Gerard Callenburgh class.

== Literature ==
- T. van Gent (2000), 17 Zeventiende eeuwse admiralen en hun zeeslagen, Plantijn Casparie Hilversum/Koninklijke Vereniging van Marineofficieren
