= Anne Hilarion de Tourville =

French Navy officer

Anne-Hilarion de Tourville KOSM
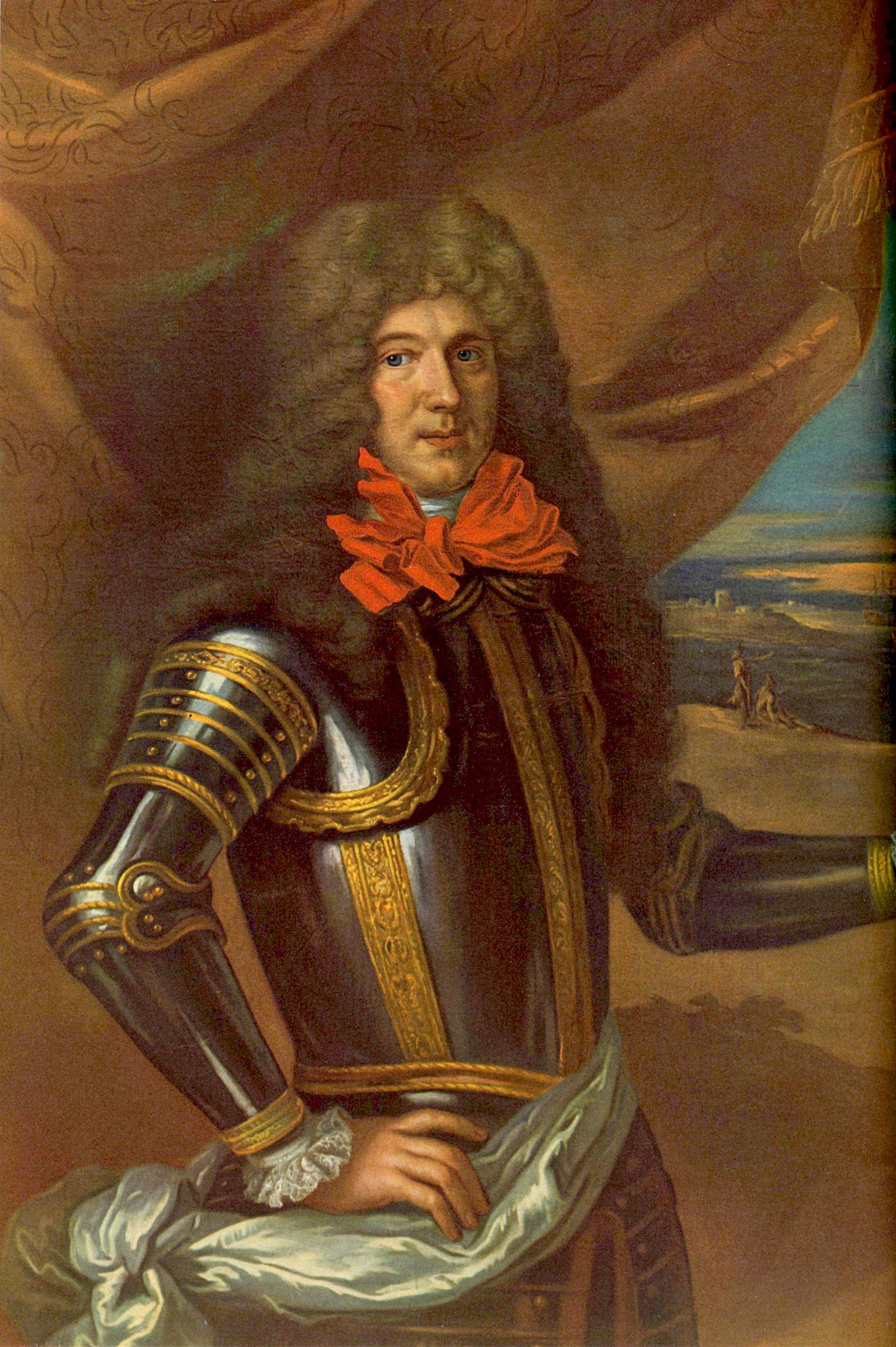
- Portrait of de Tourville
- Born: 24 November 1642; Paris, Kingdom of France
- Died: 23 May 1701 (aged 58); Paris, Kingdom of France
- Relatives: Louise-Françoise d'Hymbercourt
- Military career
- Allegiance: Knights Hospitaller; Kingdom of France
- Branch: Navy of the Order of Saint John; French Navy
- Service years: c.1660 (Malta); 1666–1693 (France)
- Rank: Marshal of France
- Units: Soleil Royal
- Commands: Levant Fleet
- Conflicts: Cretan War: Candia Expedition 1669; Franco-Dutch War: Battle of Solebay 1672; Battle of Augusta 1676; Nine Years' War: Battle of Beachy Head (1690); Raid on Teignmouth; Action at Cherbourg (1692); Battles of Barfleur and La Hougue; Battle of Lagos (1693)
- Awards: Order of Saint Michael

Anne-Hilarion de Costentin, Comte de Tourville (24 November 1642 – 23 May 1701) was a French Navy officer who served under King Louis XIV. Born in Paris, he was made a Marshal of France in 1693. Tourville is considered by some as one of the most talented naval officers in French military history.

Presented at the age of four to the Knights Hospitaller in Malta, he took part in several Mediterranean campaigns against the Barbary pirates and the Turks from a very young age. In 1666, he joined the French Royal Navy and was appointed ship’s captain the following year.

It was during the Franco-Dutch War that Tourville first made his mark, distinguishing himself in the Sicilian campaign at the battles of Stromboli, Augusta, and Palermo in 1676. After the peace, he commanded a squadron of four ships in 1679. Promoted to lieutenant-general of the naval forces in 1682, he was named vice-admiral of the Levant in 1689, a year after the death of the "Great Duquesne." During the Nine Years' War, he again stood out at the Battle of Beachy Head in 1690 and the Battle of Lagos in 1693. Made a Marshal of France, he retired at the end of the war and died in Paris in 1701 at the age of 58.

== Military career ==
At age 17, as a Knight of Malta, he fought his first naval battle on a frigate of the Order of Malta. At 25, he joined the French Royal Navy and began an active career, fighting the 1673 campaign of the Franco-Dutch War on the Sans-Pareil, at the Battle of Augusta where he was in command of the Syrene, and later in command of the Sceptre.

He served under Abraham Duquesne during the campaigns of 1676, and became a commander in 1690 during the Nine Years' War. He flew his personal flag on the Soleil Royal, where it would stay until the battles of Barfleur and La Hougue in 1692. At the Battle of Beachy Head in 1690, he defeated an Anglo-Dutch fleet, sinking, destroying or capturing seven enemy ships. Three days later he led a fleet of galleys which raided the town of Teignmouth but this proved controversial and Tourville was relieved of command by Louis XIV for failing to take advantage of the naval supremacy in the English Channel.

Tourville was eventually reinstated, and on 29 May 1692, at the action at Barfleur, with only 45 ships he fought against an Anglo-Dutch fleet of 97 ships, but was forced to retreat. His fleet suffered heavy losses after the battle when English and Dutch fire ships attacked several French ships of the line which were immobilized for repairs in port at Cherbourg-en-Cotentin. On 27 June 1693, he defeated an Anglo-Dutch convoy led by George Rooke during the Battle of Cape St. Vincent.

== Honours and tributes ==
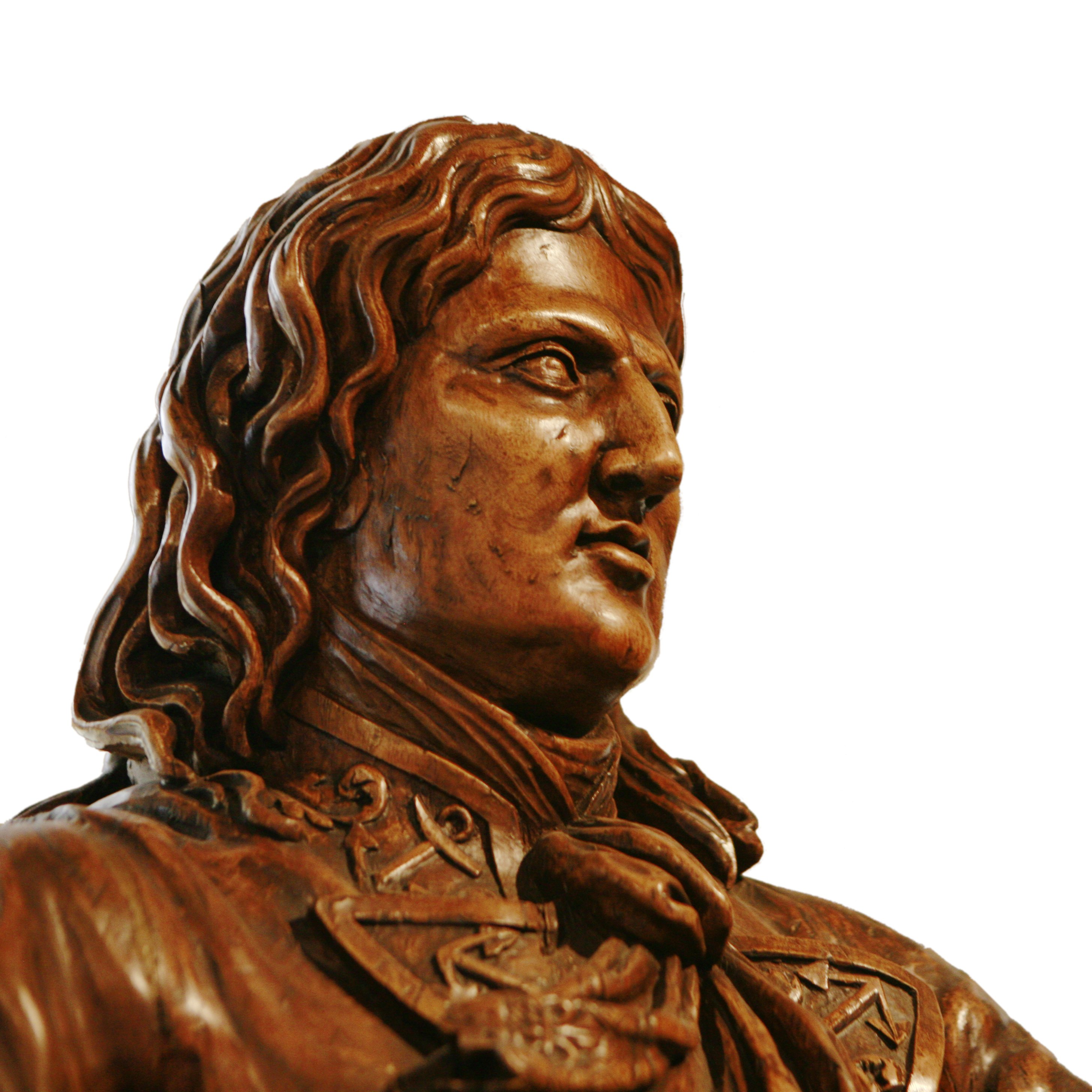
Wooden statue of Tourville, on display at Toulon naval museum

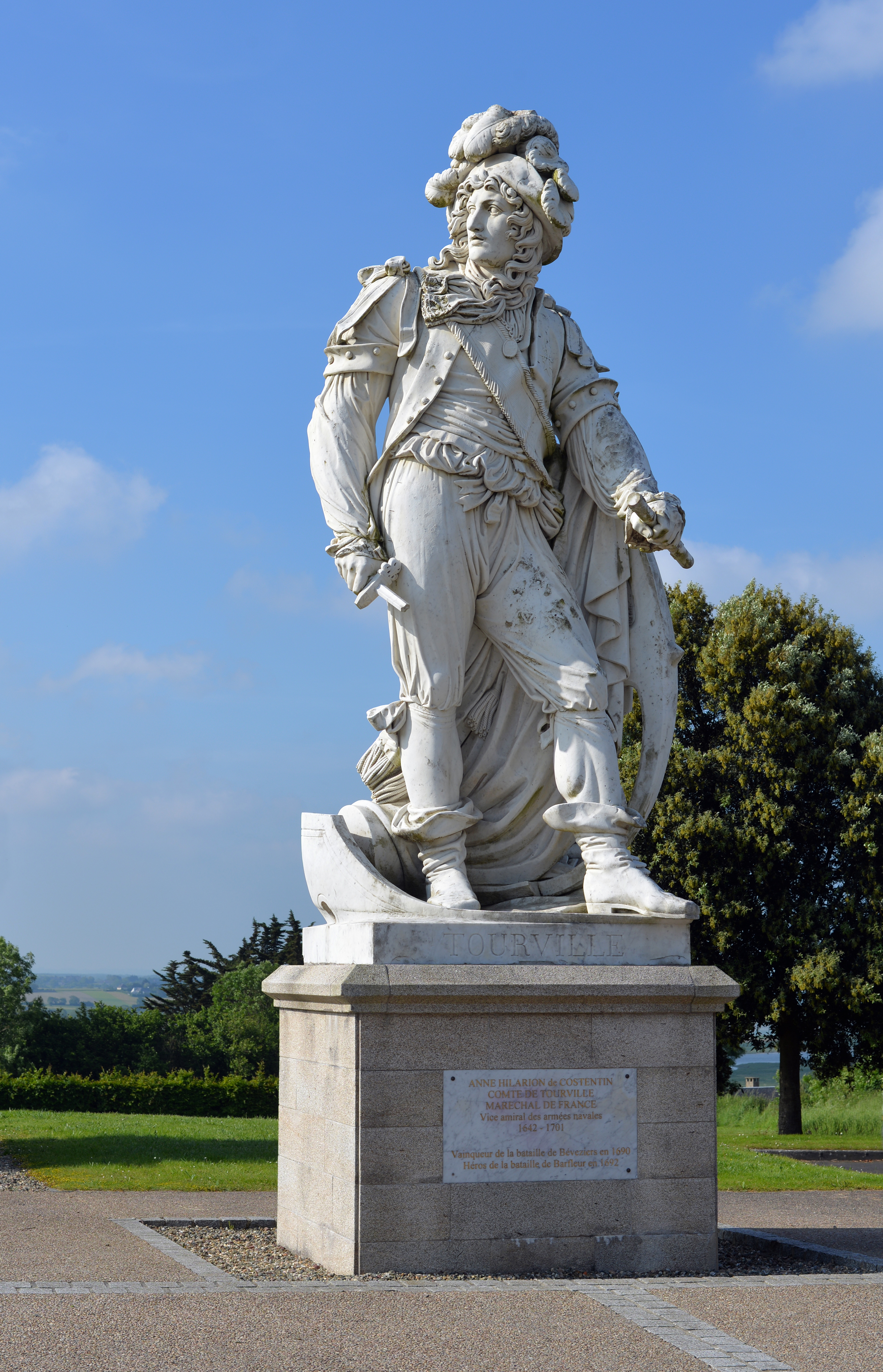
Marble statue of Tourville, by Joseph Charles Marin in Tourville-sur-Sienne

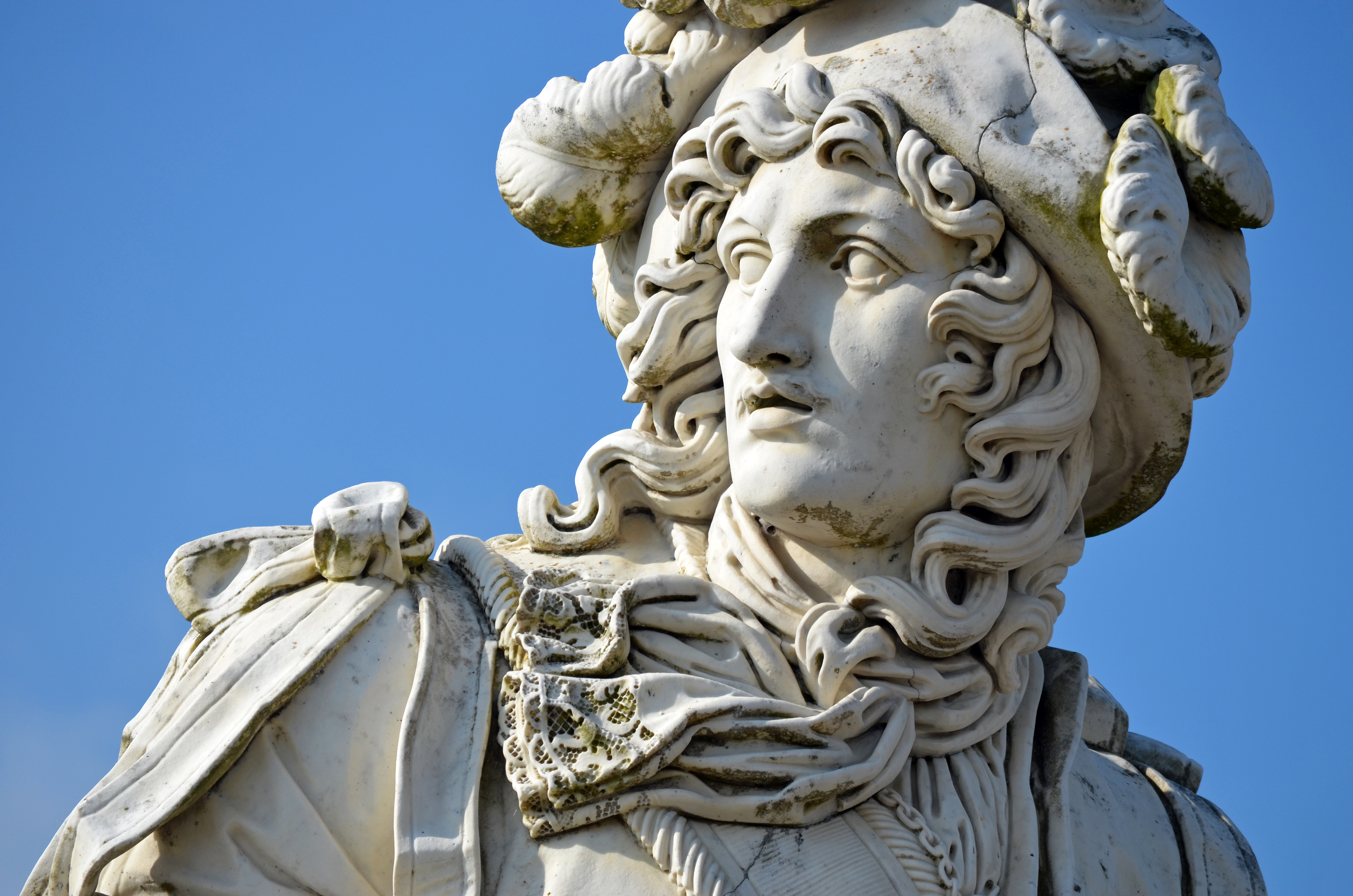
Marble statue of Tourville, by Joseph Charles Marin in Tourville-sur-Sienne

Tourville retired after the 1697 Peace of Ryswick and died in Paris on 23 May 1701, regarded as a national hero.

A number of French naval vessels from the 18th through 20th centuries were named in Tourville's honour. An 1816 marble statue of Admiral Tourville, by French sculptor Joseph Charles Marin, formerly in the Jardin de Versailles, features prominently in the Village of Tourville-sur-Seine (Normandy, Manche Département) hometown of Tourville ancestors, though Anne-Hilarion de Tourville himself was born in Paris and not in the ancestral castle of Tourville-sur-Sienne.

== See also ==
- Pierre Arnoul
