= Stopping the tide =

Stopping the tide (fr. Étaler les marées) was a manoeuver in use during the age of sail. In seas with a strong tide, such as those off the coasts of western Europe, particularly the Channel, the force of the tide on a ship could equal, or surpass, the power derived from sails. So for a ship moving along the Channel in light breezes, a favourable tide could double its speed; contrariwise, when the tide changed the ship could be slowed to a halt, or even be swept backwards. To cope with this, ships would anchor, "stopping the tide", to preserve their progress. The technique played an important role in the naval conflicts of the period.

In actions which lasted a long time (or, at least beyond a change of tide) and which took place in light winds or calm conditions, stopping the tide could be critical. At the battle of Barfleur, for example, when Shovell's squadron was caught by the flood and dropped anchor, the Sandwich, whose captain had failed to prepare for this, was swept by the tide towards, and through, the French line of battle, who had also anchored; she was exposed to their concentrated fire and suffered extensive damage.

As dropping and weighing anchor took time and effort, the decision to do so, and when, could be critical. At the battle of Beachy Head, when the tide changed the allied fleet was at a disadvantage; Torrington was able to anchor against the ebb before the French, who were carried away from him, gaining his fleet a respite. Later, he was able to use the flood to escape. At Barfleur Tourville in the same situation was able to escape by the same means.

A fleet at anchor, and stationary with a tide running past it, was highly vulnerable to attack by fireship; all fleets of the time included fireships for this purpose. The up-tide fleet would send fireships to drift down onto the enemy, whose only option, if they could not destroy them by gunfire, or fend them off using boats, would be to cut their anchor cables and flee.

Cutting and running could also be used to gain a time advantage when using the tide to escape, but involved the loss of an anchor; in a long engagement, where this could happen more than once, a ship could run out of anchors, leaving it helpless before the tide, or have to sacrifice its cannon to jury-rig a replacement. Dramatically, this happened to the French fleet during the pursuit after Barfleur; Tourville's squadron, unable to round Cap de la Hague with the rest of his fleet, and with anchors dragging in a strong flood, were forced to cut, leaving them to be swept along the Normandy coast to be beached at Cherbourg and La Hogue.

== Sources ==
- Aubrey P: The Defeat of James Stuart's Armada 1692(1979) ISBN 0-7185-1168-9
