= French ship Assuré =

Several ships of the French Navy have borne the name Assuré:

- French ship Assuré (1671), a 54-gun ship of the line
- French ship Assuré (1697), a 60-gun third-rate
