= Battle of Augusta =

1676 battle of the Franco-Dutch War

Coordinates: 37.2500°N 15.3500°E

- Part of the Franco-Dutch War
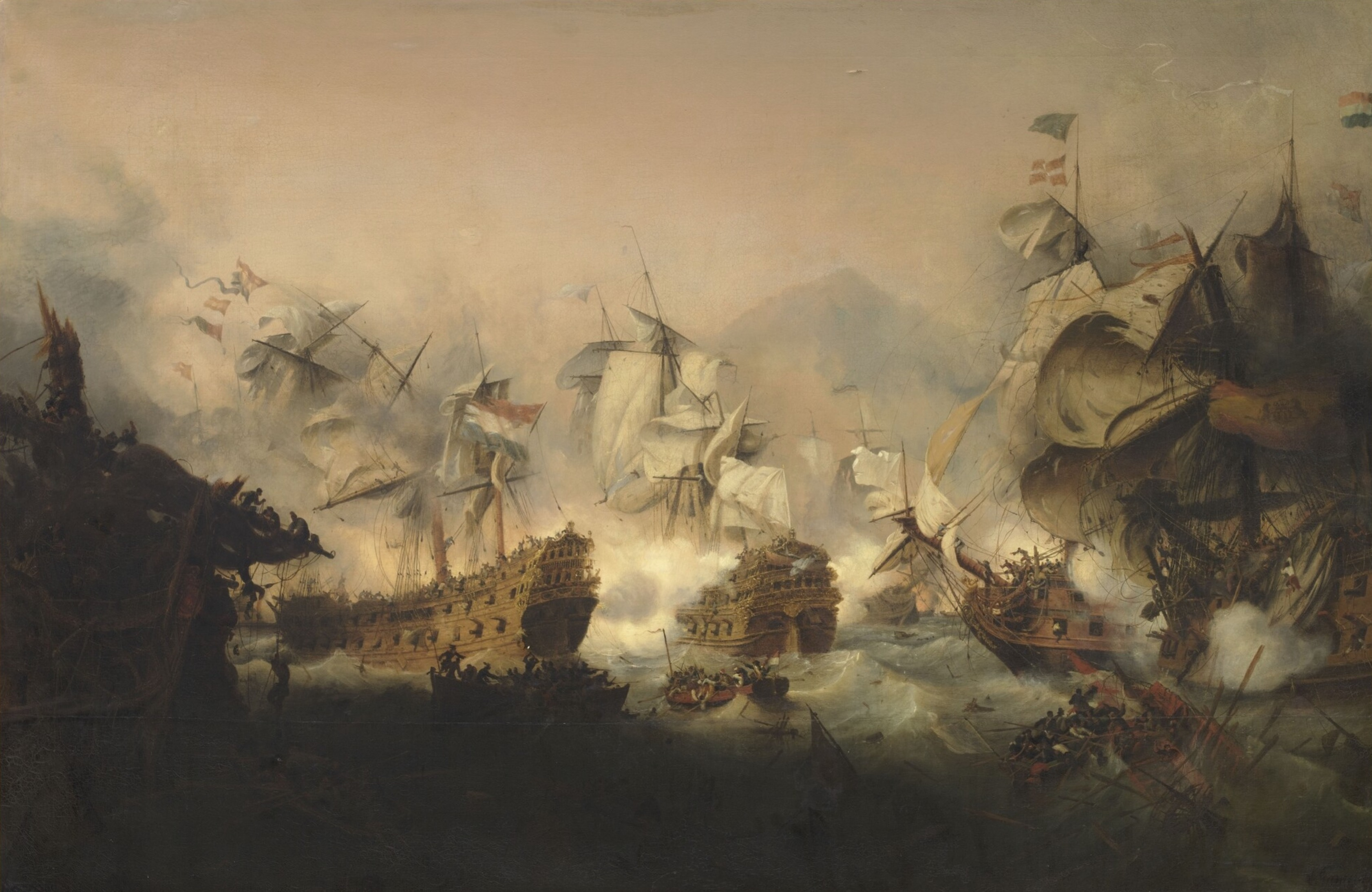
- Naval battle off Augusta in the Gulf of Messina, April 21, 1676; Ambroise Louis Garneray, 1836
Date	22 April 1676
Location	Off Augusta, Sicily
Result	Inconclusive

Belligerents
Dutch Republic; Spain	France

Commanders and leaders
(Spain) Francisco de la Cerda (Dutch Republic) Michiel de Ruyter †	(Kingdom of France) Abraham Duquesne

Strength
27 ships of the line and frigates 1,300–1,450 guns	34 ships of the line and frigates 1,760–2,200 guns

Casualties and losses
~2,000 killed or wounded	~2,000 killed or wounded

The Battle of Augusta (Note: Also known as the Battle of Agosta or Battle of Etna) took place near Augusta, Sicily on 22 April 1676 during the Franco-Dutch War. It featured a French fleet under Abraham Duquesne, and a combined Dutch-Spanish fleet, under the overall command of Francisco de la Cerda.

For much of the battle, only part of each fleet was engaged, and despite heavy casualties and severe damage, neither side lost any ships. It ended when the Dutch admiral, Michiel de Ruyter, extracted his squadron from being attacked by superior French numbers, although he was mortally wounded in doing so. The fleets separated next day without resuming the battle, and the result was inconclusive.

== Background ==
Since both Louis XIV of France and the Dutch Republic viewed control of the Spanish Netherlands as essential for security and trade, it was a contested area for much of the later 17th century. In the 1667-68 War of Devolution with Spain, France occupied much of the region before the Dutch-led Triple Alliance forced them to withdraw in the Treaty of Aix-la-Chapelle (1668). After this, Louis decided the best way to achieve his territorial ambitions was to first defeat the Dutch.

When the Franco-Dutch War began in May 1672, French troops quickly overran large parts of the Netherlands, but by July the Dutch position had stabilised. Concern at French gains brought the Dutch support from Brandenburg-Prussia, Emperor Leopold, and Charles II of Spain. In August 1673, Louis withdrew from the Netherlands, retaining only Grave and Maastricht. In January 1674, Denmark–Norway joined the anti-French coalition, while in February the Treaty of Westminster ended the Third Anglo-Dutch War, depriving Louis of a key ally against the Dutch.

The war expanded into Germany, while in July 1674, the Sicilian town of Messina expelled its Spanish garrison and asked for French protection. A small French squadron arrived in September, but had to withdraw in the face of a larger Spanish fleet. In January 1675, a reinforced French force of 20 ships escorted a supply convoy through the Spanish blockade, then defeated the Spanish fleet in a battle off the Aeolian Islands on 11 February 1675, ending the blockade of Messina.

The Spanish then asked for Dutch assistance. Michiel de Ruyter was sent to the Mediterranean with eighteen larger warships and a number of smaller vessels although, because Dutch resources had been strained by the continuing Franco-Dutch War, these ships were not fully manned. On 8 January 1676, de Ruyter fought a French fleet of roughly equal numbers but greater firepower in the inconclusive Battle of Stromboli, in which the Dutch lost one ship. Later in 1676, de Ruyter was joined by a Spanish squadron under Admiral de la Cerda, who assumed command of the combined force. The two agreed to attack Augusta and force the French fleet to leave Messina.

== Battle ==
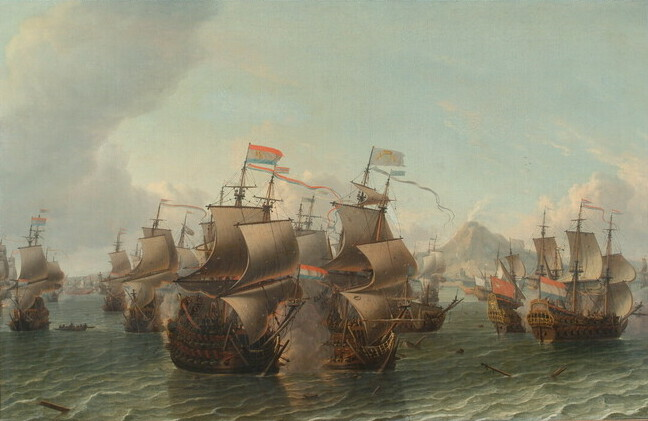
Battle of Augusta, by Abraham Storck

The attack on Augusta had the desired effect of drawing the French fleet out to sea and, on 22 April 1676, the two fleets met in the Bay of Catania north of Augusta. De la Cerda rejected de Ruyter's suggestion of mingling Dutch and Spanish ships, and the Spanish formed the combined fleet's centre squadron, with Dutch squadrons in the van, led by de Ruyter, and rear, under Jan de Haan. Both available sources agree that there were 29 French ships of the line and 13 Dutch warships, not all fit to fight in line. Jenkins mentions ten Spanish warships, Blackmore 14, besides several Dutch and Spanish frigates, and also five French frigates and eight fireships, and he also suggests that the French fleet was superior in firepower to its opponents.

Both fleets sailed in line ahead and were organised into three divisions. The battle was largely an intense fight between the two van squadrons, as de la Cerda kept the centre at long range from its French counterpart, possibly because his ships were short of gunpowder. Some ships in the rear of de Haan's squadron had engaged the tail of Gabret's squadron, but otherwise this squadron kept in line with the Spanish centre for most of the battle. The conduct of the Spanish centre enabled the leading ships of Duquesne's centre to join in the attack on de Ruyter's van squadron and engage his outnumbered ships on both sides.

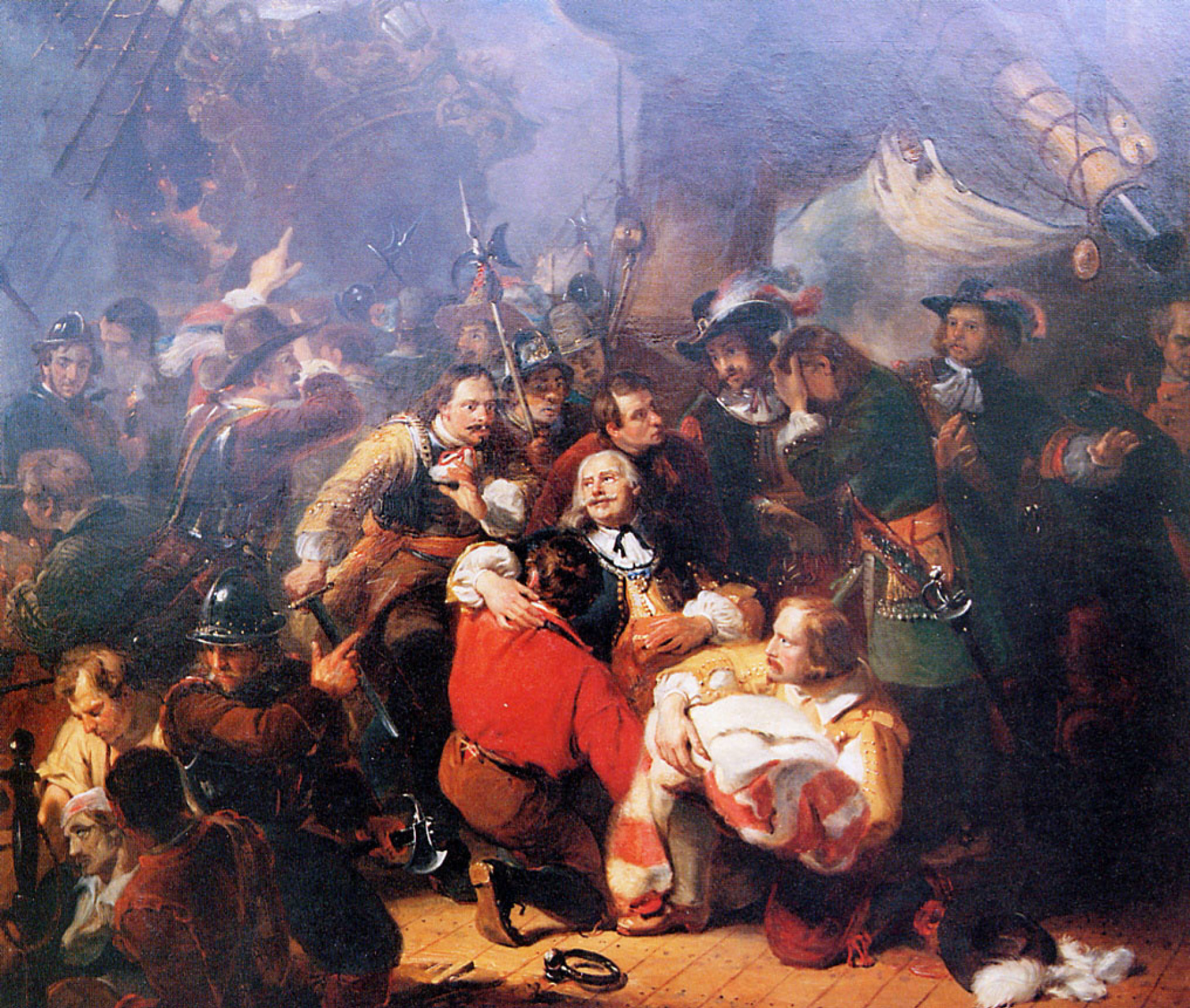
De Ruyter is mortally wounded, by Nicolaas Pieneman

In the fierce fighting between the two van divisions, the French ship Lys was forced out of line and the commander of the French van, Lieutenant-Général Alméras was killed. Towards the end of the day, de Ruyter in Eendracht attacked Duquesne in Saint-Esprit with the intention of boarding. but Tourville in Sceptre, aided by Saint Michel went to their admiral's aid.

Lack of Spanish support allowed the French to envelop de Ruyter's squadron. As a result, the Dutch van suffered more severely than their opponents, with three ships so badly damaged they had to be towed to port by Spanish galleys. Disaster was averted when de Haan moved to support de Ruyter, allowing him to extricate his ships. De la Cerda finally intervened by shielding the Dutch while they retreated from the battle, but de Ruyter was hit in the leg by a cannonball, and died a week later at Syracuse, Sicily.

== Aftermath ==
Next morning, the fleets separated without further fighting, and combined Dutch-Spanish fleet withdrew to Palermo to repair their battle damage, abandoning any attempt to attack Messina. A month later, on 28 May 1676, the French fleet attacked combined Dutch-Spanish fleet and a squadron of Spanish galleys, all at anchor in Palermo harbour in the naval Battle of Palermo and destroyed two Dutch warships by gunfire seven Spanish warships and two galleys and another Dutch ship by the use of fireships in the enclosed harbour. De Haan, who had assumed command of the Dutch fleet, was killed during the battle. Despite this significant victory, the French withdrew from Messina in 1678, and the Spanish regained control of the city.

== Order of battle ==
=== France (Abraham Duquesne) ===
==== Van Squadron (Alméras) ====
- Fidèle 56 (Chevalier de Cogolin)
- Heureux 54 (Monsieur de La Bretesche)
- Vermandois 50 (Chevalier de Tambonneau, killed)
- Pompeux 72 (Chevalier de Valbelle, chef d'escadre)
- Lys 74 (Lieutenant-Général Marquis Guillaume d'Alméras, killed; flag-captains Etienne Gentet and Chevalier de Montbron)
- Magnifique 72 (Monsieur de La Gravière)
- Parfait 60 (Monsieur de Chasteneuf)
- Apollon 54 (Chevalier de Forbin)
- Trident 38 (Chevalier de Bellefontaine)

Fireships

- Ardent
- Orage

==== Centre Squadron (Duquesne) ====
- Fortune 56 (Marquis d'Amfreville)
- Aimable 56 (Monsieur de La Barre)
- Joli 46 (Monsieur de Belle-Isle)
- Éclatant 60 (Monsieur de Coü, killed; replaced by Monsieur de Saint-Germen)
- Sceptre 80 (Comte Anne Hilarion de Tourville)
- Saint-Esprit 72 (vice-admiral Abraham Duquesne)
- Saint Michel 60 (Marquis de Preuilly d'Humiéres)
- Mignon 46 (Monsieur de Relingues)
- Aquilon 50 (Monsieur de Montreuil)
- Vaillant 54 (Monsieur de Septesme)

Fireships

- Salvador
- Imprudent
- Inquiet

==== Rear Squadron (Gabaret) ====
- Assuré 56 (Marquis de Villette-Mursay)
- Brusque 46 (Chevalier De La Mothe)
- Syrène 46 (Chevalier de Béthune)
- Fier 60 (Monsieur de Chabert)
- Agréable 56 (Monsieur d'Ailly)
- Sans-Pareil 70 (chef d'escadre Jean Gabaret, flag-captain Alain Emmanuel de Coëtlogon)
- Grand 72 (Monsieur de Beaulieu)
- Sage 54 (Marquis de Langeron)
- Prudent 54 (Monsieur de La Fayette)
- Téméraire 50 (Chevalier de Levy)

Fireships:

- Dangereux
- Hameson
- Dame-de-la-Mère

=== Netherlands/Spain (Michiel de Ruyter/Francisco De la Cerda) ===
==== De Ruyter Dutch squadron (van) ====
- Spiegel 70 (Gilles Schey)
- Groenwijf 36 (Jan Noirot)
- Leiden 36 (Jan van Abkoude)
- Leeuwen 50 (Frans Willem, Graaf van Limburg Stirum)
- Eendracht 76 (Lt-Admiral Michiel De Ruyter, died; flag-captain Gerard Callenburgh)
- Stad en Lande 54 (Joris Andringa)
- Zuiderhuis 46 (Pieter de Sitter)
- Damiaten 34 (Isaac van Uitterwijk)
- Oosterwijk 60 (Jacob Teding van Berkhout)
- Tonijn 8 (snauw, Philips Melkenbeek)
- Kreeft 8 (snauw, Wijbrand Barendszoon)
- Ter Goes 8 (snauw, Abraham Wilmerdonk)
- Salm 4 (fireship, Jan van Kampen)
- Melkmeisje 2 (fireship, Arent Ruyghaver)
- Zwarte Tas 4 (Jacob Stadtlander)

==== De la Cerda Spanish squadron (centre) ====
- Nuestra Señora del Pilar (Capitana Real) 64/74 (1000-1100 crew) Almirante Francisco Pereira Freire de La Cerda (or de La Zerda)
- Santiago (Nueva Real) 80
- San Antonio de Napoles 44/46 (500 crew)
- San Felipe 40/44
- San Carlo/Salvator delle Fiandre/San Salvador (Almiranta de Flandres) 40/42/48 (350 crew)
- San Joaquin/San Juan 80
- San Gabriel 40
- Santa Ana 54/60
- Nuestra Señora del Rosario 50
- Nuestra Señora de Guadalupe
- Nuestra Señora del Rosario y Las Animas

==== De Haan Dutch squadron (rear) ====
- Steenbergen 68 (Pieter van Middelandt)
- Wakende Boei 46 (Cornelis Tijloos)
- Edam 34 (Cornelis van der Zaan)
- Kraanvogel 46 (Jacob Willemszoon Broeder)
- Gouda 76 (Vice-Admiral Jan de Haan)
- Provincie van Utrecht 60 (Jan de Jong)
- Vrijheid 50 (Adam van Brederode)
- Harderwijk 46 (Mattheus Megang)
- Prinsen Wapen 8 (snauw, Hendrik Walop)
- Rouaan 8 (snauw, Willem Knijf)
- Roos 8 (snauw, Juriaan Baak)
- Sint Salvador 6 (fireship, Jan Janszoon Bont)
- Jakob en Anna 4 (fireship, Dirk Klaaszoon Harney)
- Witte tas 4 (supply ship, Adriaan van Esch)

== Commemoration ==
The French Navy (Marine Nationale) has commemorated the Battle of Augusta (French: Agosta) by naming both the Redoutable-class submarine Agosta (Q178) and the submarine Agosta (S620), lead ship of the successful Agosta class, after it.

== Sources ==
- Blackmore, David (2014). Warfare on the Mediterranean in the Age of Sail: A History, 1571-1866. McFarland. ISBN 978-0356041964.
- Bodart, Gaston (1908). Militär-historisches Kriegs-Lexikon (1618–1905).
- Carsten, F. L. (1961). The New Cambridge Modern History: Volume 5, The Ascendancy of France, 1648-88. McFarland. ISBN 978-0521045445.
- Hutton, Ronald (1989). Charles II King of England, Scotland and Ireland. Clarendon Press. ISBN 978-0198229117.
- Israel, J. I. (1995). The Dutch Republic: Its Rise, Greatness, and Fall, 1477–1806. MacDonald and Jane's. ISBN 978-0786457847.
- Jenkins, E. H. (1973). A History of the French Navy. MacDonald and Jane's. ISBN 978-0786457847.
- Lynn, John (1999). The Wars of Louis XIV, 1667–1714 (Modern Wars in Perspective). OUP. ISBN 978-0198730729.
- Macintosh, Claude Truman (1973). French Diplomacy during the War of Devolution, the Triple Alliance and the Treaty of Aix-la-Chapelle (PhD). Ohio State University.
- Rommelse, Gijs (2006). The Second Anglo-Dutch War (1665–1667). Verloren. ISBN 978-9065509079.
- Sweetman, Jack, ed. (1997). The great admirals: command at sea, 1587-1945. Naval Institute Press. ISBN 978-0-87021-229-1.
- De Jonge, Johannes Cornelis (1859). Geschiedenis van het Nederlandsche zeewezen Deel 2 (PDF) (in Dutch). A.C. Kruseman.
- Blok, P.J. (1928). Michiel de Ruyter (PDF) (in Dutch). Martinus Nijhof.
