= French ship Duquesne =

Nine ships of the French Navy have been named in honour of Abraham Duquesne:

- Duquesne (1788), a 74-gun ship of the line
- Duquesne (1811), a captured Russian 73-gun ship, used as a school ship
- Duquesne (1813) a Bucentaure-class 80-gun ship of the line
- Duquesne (1853), a steam and sail ship of the line
- Duquesne (1876) an unprotected cruiser
- Duquesne (1914), an unbuilt Lyon-class battleship
- Duquesne, a heavy cruiser (1924–1955)
- Duquesne, a Suffren-class frigate
- A Barracuda-class submarine is scheduled to bear the name

== See also ==
- Montebello, a Téméraire-class 74-gun ship of the line, was started as Duquesne before being renamed.
