= Raid on Teignmouth =

1690 raid of the Nine Years' War

- Part of the Nine Years' War
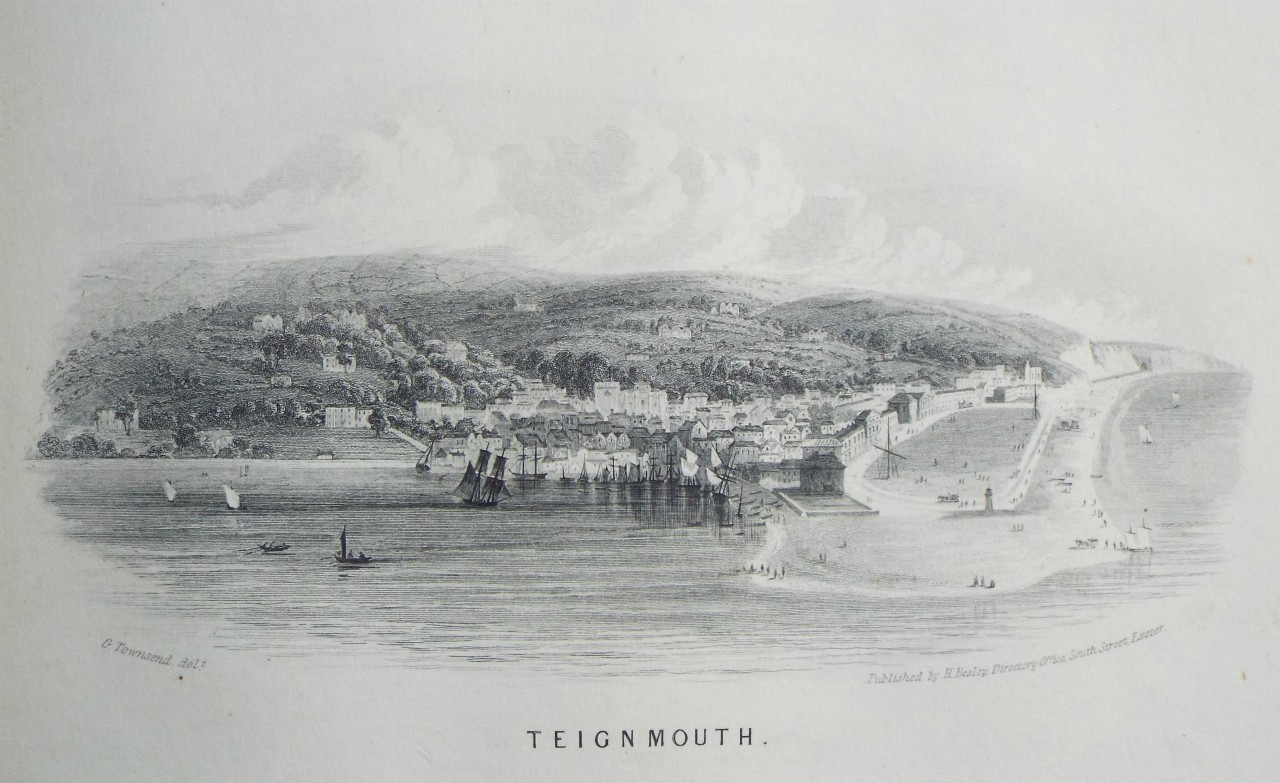
- Eighteenth century print of Teignmouth
Date	13 July 1690
Location	Off Teignmouth
Result	French victory

Belligerents
France	England

Commanders and leaders
(Kingdom of France) Tourville (Kingdom of France) D'Estrées	unknown

Strength
7 galleys 2,800 sailors and troops	100 militia

Casualties and losses
unknown	10 ships captured Teignmouth burned

The Raid on Teignmouth was a military action by French forces that took place during the Nine Years' War on 13 July 1690. French naval forces having control of the English Channel after their victory at the Battle of Beachy Head, attacked the small of town of Teignmouth. After a naval bombardment, French troops were landed, who then ransacked and burned the place, before leaving unmolested.

== Background ==
With the beginning of the Nine Years War, the French under King Louis XIV, supported the deposed Catholic King James II in the fight against the Protestant King William III. On June 23, 1690, the French admiral, Anne Hilarion de Tourville, sailed the combined Atlantic and Mediterranean fleets out of Brest with orders to destroy the Anglo-Dutch fleet led by the Earl of Torrington.

The French fleet which outnumbered the allied English and Dutch fleet met in the English Channel off Beachy Head. Torrington sailed towards the French with the Dutch in the vanguard, but the French managed to surround the Dutch ships which were badly mauled, with the English unable to help them. After hours of fighting, Torrington broke off the fight abandoning the Dutch ships too damaged to follow. Torrington was then imprisoned and court-martialed; he was cleared of failing to support the Dutch, but lost his post. Tourville, meanwhile having now gained control of the English Channel was able to roam without hindrance, heading towards the Devon coast.

== Raid ==
Anne Hilarion de Tourville intended to sail the fleet to Ireland to cut Williams lines of communication. However, they diverted into Torbay and decided to raid the place. Tourville’s ships dropped anchor and with the presence of the French close to shore, beacons were lit along the coast which roused up spirits of the memory of 1588. On observing Torbay's strong defences along with a strong force of militia lined up, he decided to leave his ships of the line where they were and sent several galleys Eastwards towards Teignmouth instead. The galleys were rowed by slaves carrying in total 2,800 sailors and troops which were designed for inshore work.

At Torbay a small French detachment made a false attack onshore to occupy the militia force. Meanwhile as the French galleys approached the town the ships opened up a bombardment. Firing nearly 200 shot which set fire and also damaged parts of the towns, the French then landed around 700 troops under Victor-Marie d'Estrées. The inhabitants managed to escape, and the only defences that could stop them was a small force of around 100 poorly armed militia but they were easily swept aside. After this the French then ransacked the town for twelve hours and destroyed eleven ships. After examining 'creditable persons' the Justices of the Peace concluded that:

by the late horrid invasion there were within the space of 12 houres burnt downe and consumed 116 dwelling houses ... and also 172 dwelling houses were rifled and plundered and two parish churches much ruined, plundred and defaced, besides the burning of ten saile of shipps with the furniture thereof, and the goods and merchandise therein ...

== Aftermath ==
The defeat of Beachy Head and the attack on Teignmouth caused panic in England. The diarist John Evelyn wrote, The whole nation now exceedingly alarmed by the French fleet braving our coast even to the very Thames mouth. With the French having command of the Channel an invasion was now feared, only 6,000 troops, along with the militia, were prepared by the Earl of Marlborough. For the French however the raid proved controversial - it was seen as a failure to exploit the success of Beachy Head. This was compounded even more when William decisively defeated James II, at the Battle of the Boyne in Ireland. Subsequently Louis XIV saw to it that Tourville was relieved of his command.

The inhabitants returned and the vast majority were left homeless. As a result, the Crown issued a church brief that authorised the collection of £11,000 for the aid of Teignmouth. Churches from as far afield as Yorkshire contributed, and the collections enabled the further development of the port. The attack on Teignmouth was the last successful foreign invasion of England.

=== Legacy ===
The town's 'French Street' with its museum is named in memory of the occasion.
