= French ship Assuré (1671) =

Ship of the line of the French Navy

History

France
- Name: Assuré
- Builder: Brest
- Launched: 1667
- Commissioned: 1668
- Fate: Broken up 1689

General characteristics
- Tonnage: 950
- Propulsion: Sail
- Armament: 54 guns

Assuré was a 54-gun ship of the line of the French Navy, designed by Hubac.

She was named Lys in 1667 and renamed Assuré on 24 June 1671. From 3 March 1674, she was fitted as a fireship under Captain du Mesny des Vaux. She took part in the Battle of Stromboli under Vilette Marsay, and in the Battle of Palermo. She was part of Jean Bart's fleet in 1681. She was broken up around 1689.
