= Joris Andringa =

Governor of New Netherland
- In office December 15, 1673 (Commissioned) – Never entered upon his duties.
- Preceded by: Anthony Colve

Personal details
- Born: c. 1635; Groningen ?
- Died: 28 May 1676; Mediterranean Sea
- Profession: Naval Officer

Joris Andringa (c. 1635 – May 28, 1676) was a Dutch naval officer.

== Career ==
Andringa served the Admiralty in Friesland and Amsterdam. In 1664 and from 1665 to 1666 he served as Secretary to Michiel de Ruyter in the Mediterranean Sea and West Indies. In 1673 he was wounded in the battle of Texel and was promoted to captain.

On December 15, 1673, the States General of the Netherlands voted, in a Secret Resolution, to appoint Joris Andringa Governor of New Netherland to succeed Anthony Colve. Before Andringa could arrive in New Netherland, the Treaty of Westminster of 1674 was signed, ending the Third Anglo-Dutch War and handing New Netherland to England. Colve remained in control until November 10, 1674, when power was formally transferred.

On 17 June 1675 Andringa married De Ruyter's niece Margaretha van Gelder in Sloten near Amsterdam. At this event he was written to be "from Groningen".

Andringa's first (and only) command was of the Stad en Lande (50 pieces) in De Ruyter's fleet, and in 1675 he was sent to the Mediterranean Sea. In 1676, he fought the French navy in the battles near Sicily, including the Battle of Stromboli and Battle of Augusta, where De Ruyter perished. He died a month after De Ruyter, and four days before the Battle of Palermo, of dysentery in an epidemic that prevailed in the fleet.

== See also ==
- New Netherland
- Director of New Netherland

== Literature ==
- Geeraert Brandt, Het leven en bedryf van den heere Michiel de Ruiter, hertog, ridder, &c. l. admiraal generaal van Hollandt en Westvrieslandt. Amsterdam, 1687.
- J.R. Bruijn, De oorlogvoering ter zee in 1673 in journalen en andere stukken. Groningen, 1966.
- J.C. Mollema, Geschiedenis van Nederland ter Zee. Amsterdam, 1939-1942 (4 delen); hier in dl. 2.
- Biographical portal (Dutch)
