= Gilles Schey =

Dutch States Navy officer

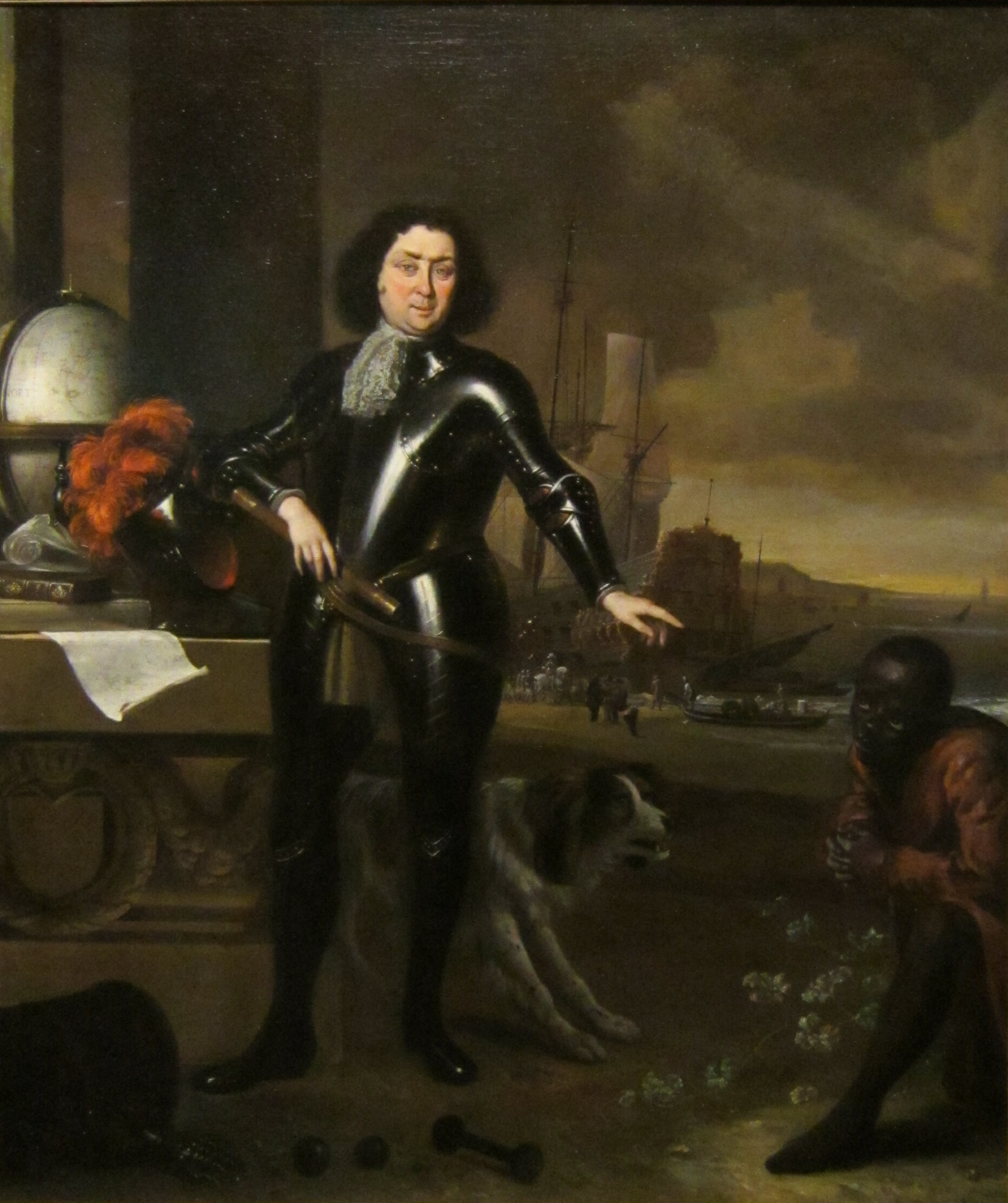
Portrait by Jan Weenix, 1693

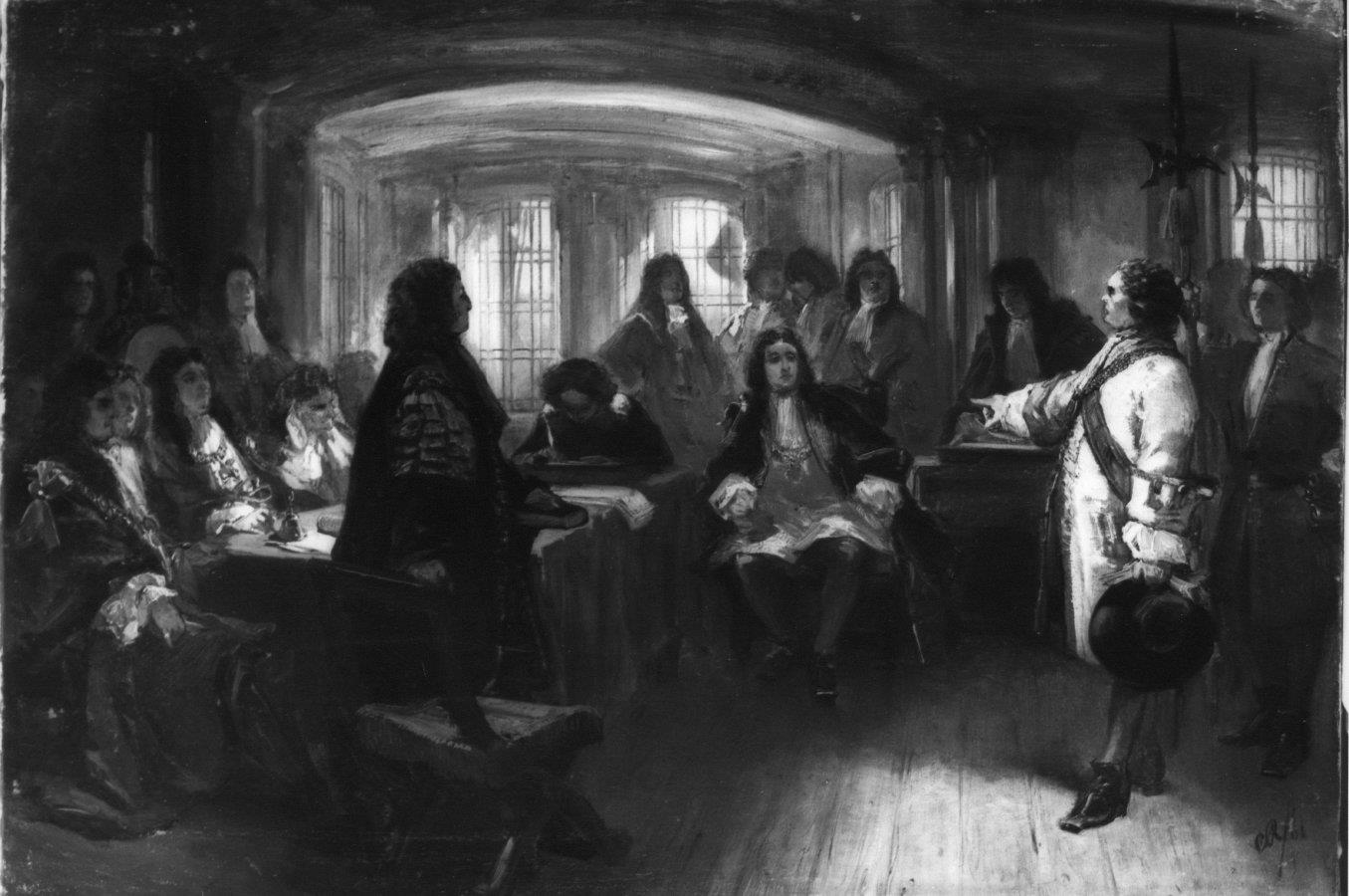
Painting of Schey blaming Lord Torrington for the defeat at Beachy Head before the post-battle court-martial

Gilles Schey (August 1644 – 15 June 1703) was a Dutch States Navy officer. Schey was born in Arnhem, the oldest of 12 children of captain Dirk Schey and Maria van Rijsselenburgh (also Maria van Iselborgh). A midshipman in 1656, he was in 1659 commander of a unit of marines during Michiel de Ruyter's liberation of Funen in the Dano-Swedish War (1658–1660). Schey continued from 1661 as a lieutenant in the marines and participated in almost every battle that the Dutch fleet fought in those years. He was present at the Battle of Lowestoft in 1665 and in actions of Lieutenant-Admiral Willem Joseph van Ghent in West Africa against the Barbary pirates in 1670.

In 1669 Schey became extraordinary captain in the Admiralty of Amsterdam. During the Third Anglo-Dutch War, Gilles was captain of the Tijdverdrijf. In 1674 he joined the squadron of Cornelis Tromp in action against France. In 1675 he was made a full captain. He was captain of the Essen at the Battle of Stromboli, and of the Spieghel at the Battle of Agosta and the Battle of Palermo. In 1678 he fought under Cornelis Evertsen the Younger. On 6 December 1683 he became Rear-Admiral under William Bastiaensz Schepers during actions in the Baltic Sea.

In 1688 he commanded the Wapen van Utrecht in the fleet with which William III of Orange invaded the British Isles. In 1690, he commanded the flagship the Princess Mary in the Battle of Beachy Head. On 1 April 1692 he became vice admiral and fought that year in the Battle of La Hougue. In the following years he performed many actions against the Dunkirk Raiders. He died in Amsterdam. Schey is best remembered because he was invited by Tsar Peter the Great, during his visit to the Republic, to come to work for him in the Russian navy, but Schey declined. On 1 September 1697 Schey had in fact organised a mock battle on the IJ, which had made a great impression on the Tsar.
