= French submarine Agosta (S620) =

French attack submarine

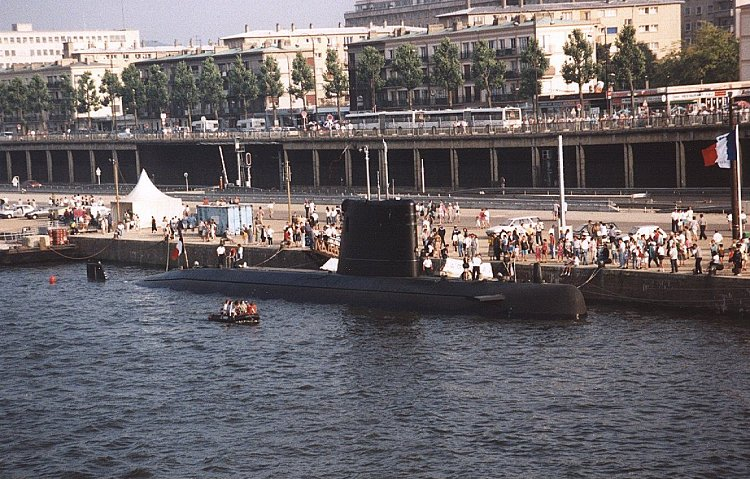
- Agosta at Rouen, 1994

History

France
- Name: Agosta
- Namesake: Battle of Augusta
- Builder: Cherbourg Naval Base
- Laid down: 1 November 1972
- Launched: 19 October 1974
- Commissioned: 28 July 1977
- Fate: Scrapped, 2021

General characteristics
- Class & type: Agosta-class submarine
- Displacement: Surfaced: 1,450 tons; Submerged: 1,725 tons
- Length: 67.6 m (221 ft 9 in)
- Beam: 6.8 m (22 ft 4 in)
- Draft: 5.5 m (18 ft 1 in)
- Installed power: Surfaced: 3,600 bhp (2,700 kW); Submerged: 4,600 shp (3,400 kW)
- Propulsion: 2 × SEMT-Pielstick diesel engines; Electric motors; 1 shaft
- Speed: Surfaced: 12 knots (22 km/h; 14 mph); Submerged: 20 knots (37 km/h; 23 mph)
- Complement: 54
- Armament: 4 × bow-mounted 550 mm (22 in) torpedo tubes; 16 × torpedoes

Agosta (S620) was the lead Agosta-class diesel-electric attack submarine of the French Navy. Launched in 1974, she served as a prototype for her class and primarily operated throughout the Mediterranean Sea during the Cold War. After several refits, she left service in 2003 and was scrapped in 2021.

== Development and design ==
In 1972, the French Navy proposed Plan Bleu to modernize the fleet and deemphasize ballistic missile submarines. The plan, among other elements, called for 20 fleet submarines by 1985. Consequently, the loss of many French colonies reduced emphasis on French ships operating in Asia and Africa. Compared to the previous Narval-class submarines designed in the 1950s, the Agosta class incorporated two decades of improved technology, a similar displacement, and a smaller size and range.

The Agosta-class attack submarines measured 67.6 metres (221 ft 9 in) overall in length, with a beam of 6.8 metres (22 ft 4 in) and a draught of 5.5 metres (18 ft 1 in). The boats displaced 1,450 tons surfaced and 1,725 tons submerged and carried a complement of 54. Propulsion was provided through a single shaft powered by two SEMT-Pielstick diesel engines and electric motors, which produced 3,600 brake horsepower (2,700 kW) when surfaced and 4,600 shaft horsepower (3,400 kW) submerged. This machinery enabled a maximum speed of 12 knots (22 km/h; 14 mph) surfaced and 20 knots (37 km/h; 23 mph) submerged. Armament consisted of four bow-mounted 550 mm (22 in) torpedo tubes and 16 torpedoes carried onboard. Onboard sonars included the DUUA-2, DSUV-2, and DUUX-2.

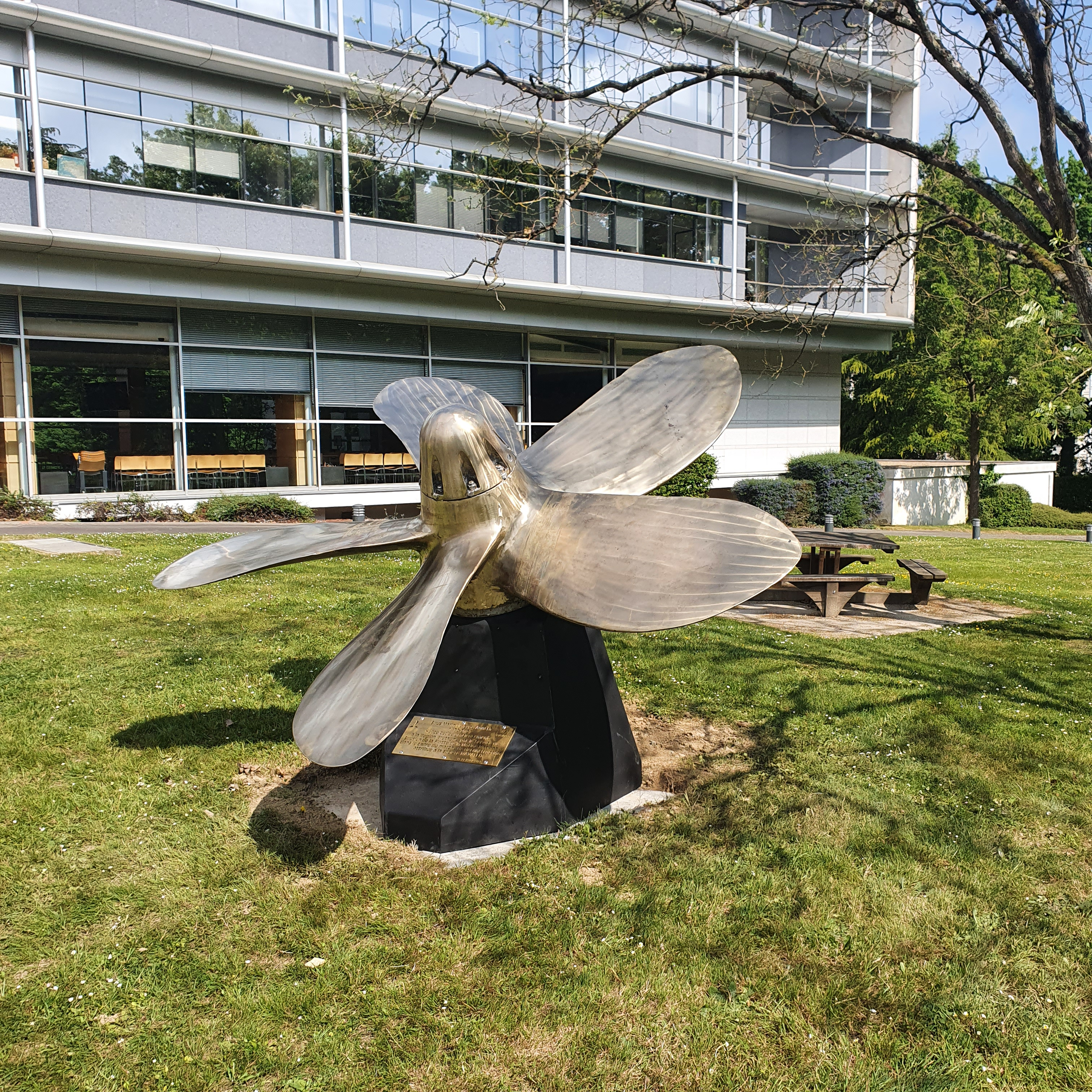
Agosta's propeller displayed in Rennes, 2022

== Service history ==
Agosta was laid down at the Cherbourg Naval Base on 1 November 1972, launched on 19 October 1974, and commissioned on 28 July 1977. She was named after the 1676 Battle of Augusta off Sicily.

Between 1974 and 1977, the submarine operated out of Brest to test the new design in the Atlantic. Following her commissioning, she was reassigned to the French Mediterranean Fleet and performed 45-day patrols during the Cold War. Other duties included embarking forces, military exercises in the Atlantic, and international port visits. By 1987, the class was retrofitted to launch SM 39 Exocet missiles out of the torpedo tubes, and Agosta was refitted to allow her to continue operating until 2003.

In 2003, the submarine was redesignated Q739 and assigned to Toulon in 2003. There, the boat was used as a target in shock tests to evaluate the effectiveness of digital simulations. In 2021, she was loaded onto the heavy load carrier Jumbo Kinetic and transported to Brest for scrapping. The next year, her salvaged propeller was donated to the government of Brittany to symbolize the region's ties to the Navy. The propeller now on display in front of the Brittany Regional Council in Rennes.
