= Battle of Beachy Head (1690) =

1690 battle of the Nine Years' War

- Part of the Nine Years' War
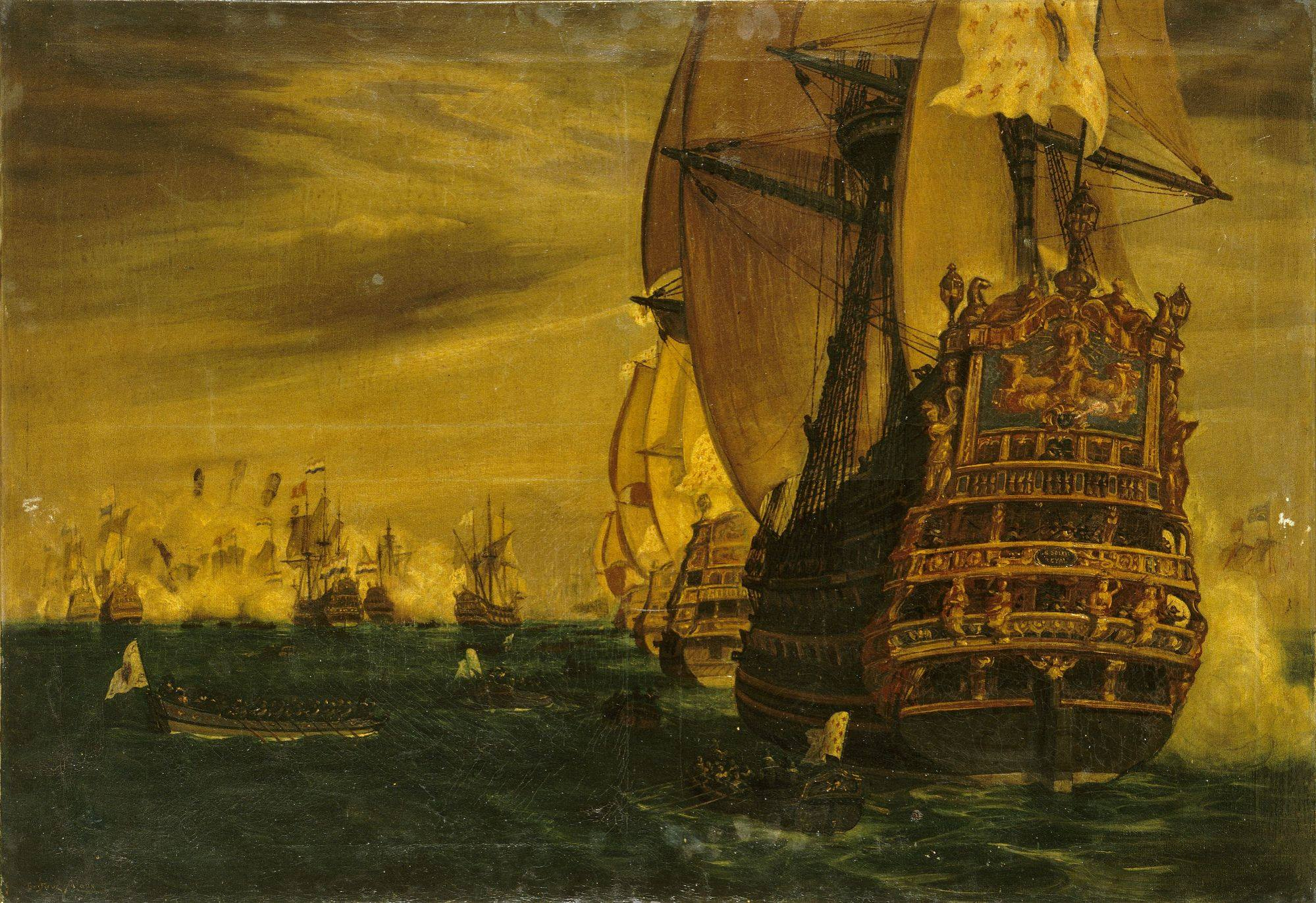
- 1928 painting of the battle
Date	10 July 1690
Location	Off Beachy Head, English Channel 50.73743°N 0.24768°E
Result	French victory

Belligerents
France	England; Dutch Republic

Commanders and leaders
(Kingdom of France) Anne de Tourville (Kingdom of France) Châteaurenault (Kingdom of France) D'Estrées (Kingdom of France) Claude de Forbin	(Kingdom of England) Earl of Torrington (Kingdom of England) Ralph Delaval (Dutch Republic) Cornelis Evertsen

Strength
75 ships 28,000 crewmen	56 ships 23,000 crewmen

Casualties and losses
Unknown	2,350–4,000 killed or wounded 1 ship of the line captured 1 ship of the line sunk 6 ships of the line scuttled 2 fire ships sunk 1 fire ship scuttled

The Battle of Beachy Head, also known as the Battle of Béveziers, was a fleet action fought on 10 July 1690 during the Nine Years' War. The battle was the most significant French naval victory over their Grand Alliance opponents during the war. The Dutch lost seven ships of the line and three fire ships. Their English allies also lost one ship of the line, whereas the French did not lose a single vessel. Control of the English Channel temporarily fell into French hands but French Vice-Admiral Anne Hilarion de Tourville failed to pursue the Anglo-Dutch fleet with sufficient vigour, allowing it to fall back to the Thames.

Tourville was criticised for not following up his victory and was relieved of his command. English Admiral Arthur Herbert, 1st Earl of Torrington, who had advised against engaging the superior French fleet but had been overruled by Queen Mary II and her ministers, was court-martialled for his performance during the battle. Although he was acquitted, King William III dismissed him from the service.

== Background ==
The deposed James II of England fled to Ireland as a first step to regain the throne following his deposition after the Glorious Revolution. In August 1689, Marshal Frederick Schomberg had been sent from England to bolster the forces loyal to King William but after the Siege of Carrickfergus his army had stalled through the winter of 1689–90, suffering from sickness and desertion. As early as January 1690, it was clear to William that he would have to sail to Ireland, with substantial reinforcements, to salvage the situation.

The main Allied fleet under Admiral Herbert, Earl of Torrington, was stationed in the English Channel. A substantial part of the fleet was in the Mediterranean under Vice Admiral Henry Killigrew, which the Earl of Nottingham, William's Secretary of State and chosen naval advisor, hoped would neutralize the French Toulon squadron. Sir Cloudesley Shovell remained in the Irish Sea but his squadron was much too small to stop the French controlling these waters if they chose to do so. The French decided not to use their fleet as a subsidiary to the Irish campaign; King Louis XIV instead directed his navy against Torrington in the Channel. Although 6,000 French troops under the command of the Comte de Lauzun were ferried across to Ireland to aid James on 17 March, the French fleet under the Comte de Tourville returned to Brest on 1 May and there remained inactive during May and June, whilst the grand fleet was assembling.

This French inaction had provided William with the opportunity he desired. On 21 June, he embarked his forces at Chester on board 280 transports, escorted by only six men-of-war commanded by Shovell. On 24 June, unmolested by the French fleet, William landed in Carrickfergus with 15,000 men for his Irish campaign, much to the consternation of James's chief lieutenant in Ireland, the Earl of Tyrconnel, who later wrote: "The want of a squadron of French men-of-war in St George's Channel has been our ruin ... "

== Prelude ==
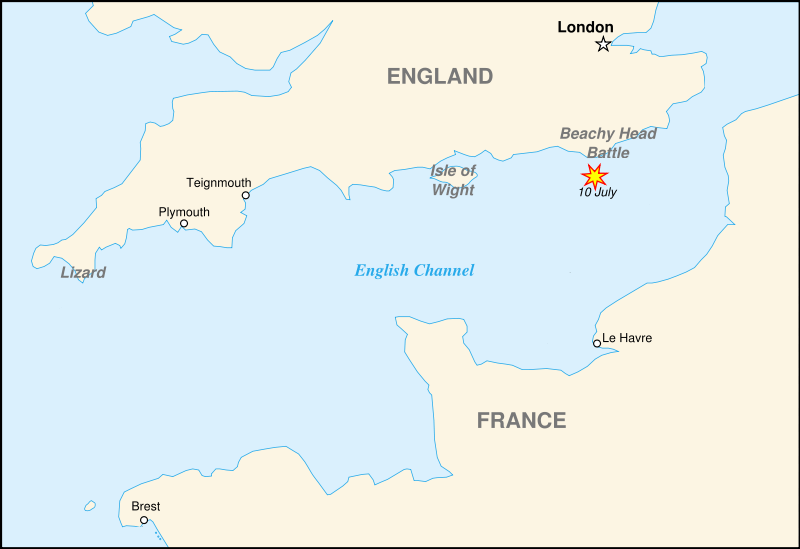
Battle of Beachy Head, 10 July 1690. Tourville had won a clear victory but failed to exploit the success.

After evading Killigrew off Cádiz, the Toulon squadron (Château-Renault) joined Tourville's fleet on 21 June. Tourville, commanding the combined Brest and Mediterranean fleets, with 75 ships of the line and 23 fire ships, sailed on 23 June into the Channel. By 30 June, the French were off the Lizard. Torrington sailed from the Nore, already convinced the French would be stronger – much of the Royal Navy had been diverted to protect their maritime commerce from privateers and the Allied fleet had only 56 English and Dutch ships of the line, with 4,153 guns, against the French fleet of 4,600 guns.

Torrington's fleet reached the Isle of Wight and was joined by a Dutch squadron, consisting of 22 ships, under the command of Cornelis Evertsen. On 5 July, Torrington sighted the French fleet, calculating their strength at almost 80 ships of the line. Unable to proceed to the westward to link up with Shovell and Killigrew (who was on his way home), Torrington announced his intention of retreating before the superior French fleet to the Straits of Dover, believing that the risk to the fleet in being would be too great.

In William's absence, Queen Mary II and her advisors – the 'Council of Nine' – hastened to take measures for the defence of the country. Carmarthen thought that it was advisable to fight, as did Nottingham and Admiral Russell, who were unconvinced that the French were as strong as Torrington reported and considered that only the admiral's pessimism, defeatism or treachery could account for his reports. As the two fleets moved slowly up the channel (with Torrington keeping carefully out of range), Russell drafted the order to fight. Countersigned by Nottingham, the orders reached the admiral on 9 July whilst he was off Beachy Head. Torrington realised that not to give battle was to be guilty of direct disobedience and to give battle was, in his judgment, to incur serious risk of defeat. Torrington called a council of war with his flag-officers, who concluded that they had no option but to obey.

== Battle ==
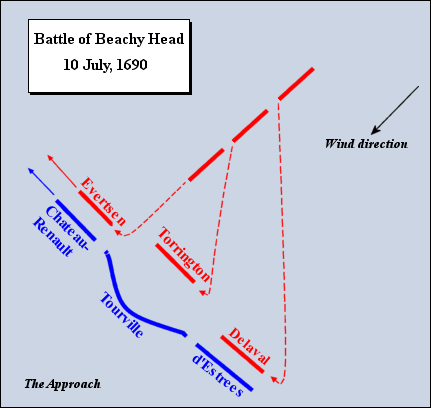
The French fleet bearing NNW towards the English coast. The French centre sagged exactly where the Comte de Tourville was stationed.

The following day, 10 July, off Beachy Head near Eastbourne, Torrington advanced towards the French in line of battle. He placed the Dutch white squadron with 21 ships – commanded by Cornelis Evertsen – in the van. Torrington was in the centre red squadron; the rear blue squadron, commanded by Vice-Admiral Ralph Delaval, comprised English and Dutch ships.

The French admiral divided his force of 70 ships of the line into the customary three squadrons, with white, blue, and white and blue pennants respectively. Tourville, aboard the Soleil Royal, commanded the centre, white squadron. The blue squadron in the French van was commanded by Châteaurenault; Victor-Marie d'Estrées commanded the rear white and blue squadron. In each fleet the squadron commanders were in the centre of their respective squadrons and the division flag officers in the centre of their divisions.

At about 08:00 the Allies, who had the weather gage, ran down together in line abreast, elongated in order to cover the whole French fleet and prevent doubling at either end. The Dutch squadron bore down on the leading French squadron to engage on a parallel course but left the leading division of Châteaurenault's squadron unmarked. This division cut across Evertsen's path and doubling on the Dutch squadron, was able to inflict much loss.

Vice Admiral Ashby of the red squadron failed to help the Dutch, as the Marquis de Villette succeeded in tacking ahead, placing Ashby between two fires. When Torrington brought the remainder of the red squadron into action, he found difficulty in getting close enough because of the sag in the French line and came no closer than twice gunshot range. Admiral Tourville, finding himself with few adversaries in the centre, pushed forward his own leading ships, which Torrington's dispositions had left without opponents, further strengthening the French attack in the van. The Dutch were now opposed by the whole of Châteaurenault's squadron and the van and centre divisions of Tourville's squadron.

Delaval's greatly outnumbered blue squadron fought a desperate battle with d'Estrées in the rear. Evertsen in the van, having lost his second-in-command and many other officers, was forced to withdraw. The Dutch had maintained the unequal contest with very little assistance from the rest of the Allied fleet; he left two Dutch fire ships sunk (Suikermolen and Kroonvogel), one shattered and dismasted vessel captured (Friesland of 68 cannon which was later burnt by the French) and many badly damaged. Outmatched, Torrington ended the battle late in the afternoon. Evertsen prevented further Dutch losses by taking advantage of the tide and the drop in wind. He ordered his ships to drop their anchors while in full sail, the French – who were not sufficiently alert – were carried off by the current and out of cannon range.

The eight-hour battle was a victory for the French but far from decisive. When the tide changed at 21:00, the Allies weighed anchor. Tourville pursued, but instead of ordering a general chase, he maintained the strict line-of-battle, reducing the speed of the fleet to that of the slower ships. Torrington burnt six more badly damaged Dutch ships (Noorderkwartier, Gekroonde Burg, Maagd van Enkhuizen, Elswout, Tholen and the fire ship Maagd van Enkhuizen) and one English ship (the third rate 70-gun Anne) to avoid their capture before gaining the refuge of the Thames. The Wapen van Utrecht sank by herself. As soon as Torrington was in the safety of the river, he ordered all the navigation buoys removed, making any attempt to follow him too dangerous.

== Aftermath ==
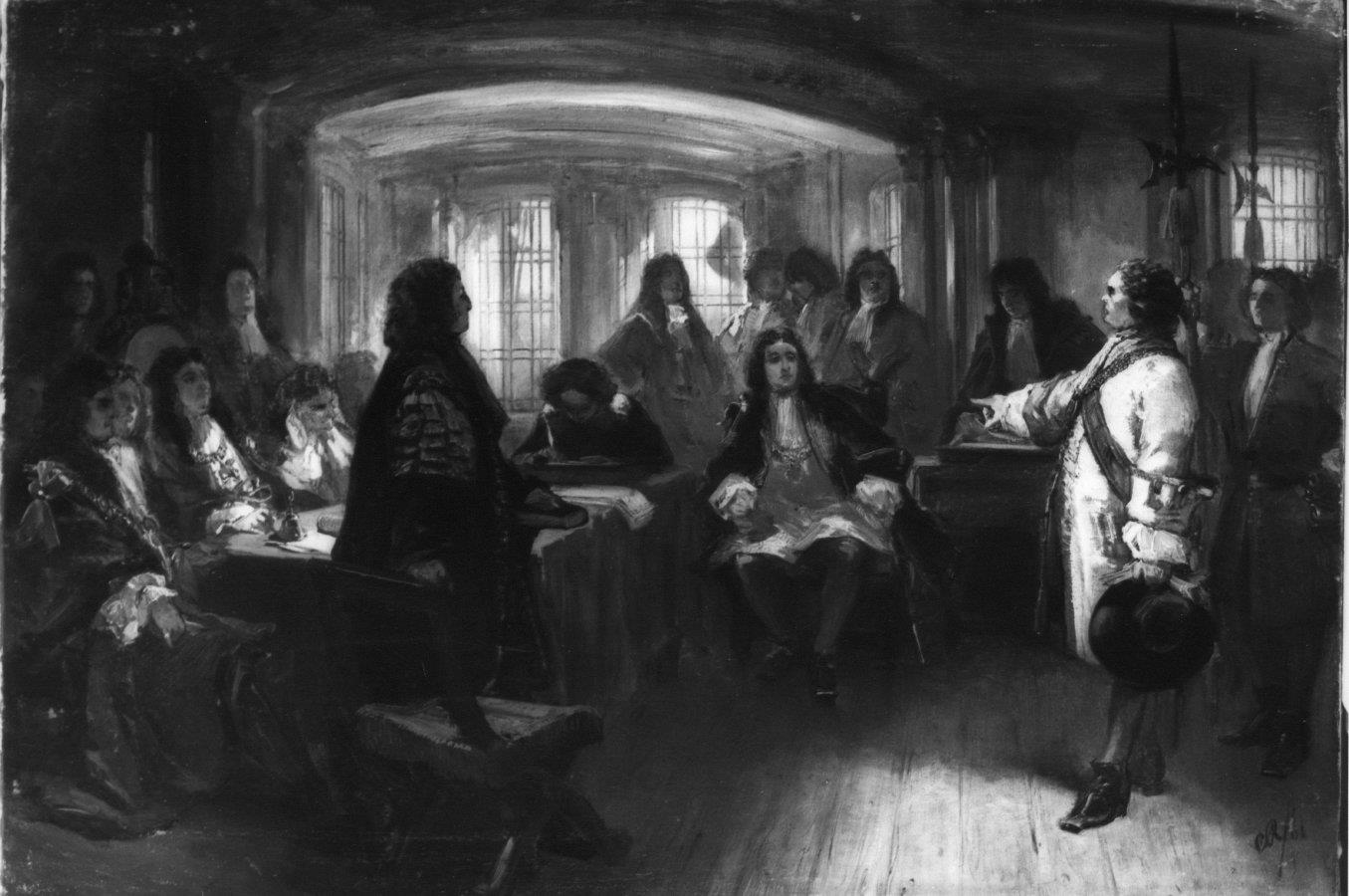
Painting of Gilles Schey blaming Torrington before a post-battle court-martial

The defeat of Beachy Head caused panic in England. Tourville had temporary command of the English Channel. It seemed that the French could at the same time prevent William from returning from Ireland across the Irish Sea and land an invading army in England. Diarist John Evelyn wrote – "The whole nation now exceedingly alarmed by the French fleet braving our coast even to the very Thames mouth", a fear compounded by news from the Continent of French victory at the Battle of Fleurus on 1 July. To oppose the threatened invasion, 6,000 regular troops, together with the hastily organised militia, were prepared by the Earl of Marlborough for the country's defence.

In the prevailing atmosphere of panic, no-one attributed the defeat to overwhelming odds. Evertsen said that Torrington had intentionally deserted the Dutch. Nottingham accused Torrington of treachery, informing William on 13 July "In plain terms ... Torrington deserted the Dutch so shamefully that the whole squadron had been lost if some of our ships had not rescued them." Nottingham was anxious to shift blame but no one disputed his interpretation. "I cannot express to you", wrote William to the Grand Pensionary Anthonie Heinsius in the Dutch Republic, "how distressed I am at the disasters of the fleet. I am so much the more deeply affected as I have been informed that my ships did not properly support those of the Estates, and left them in the lurch.

There was some good news for the Allies. The day after Beachy Head, 11 July, William decisively defeated Louis' ally, James II, at the Battle of the Boyne in Ireland. James fled to France but appeals to Louis for an invasion of England were not heeded. The Marquis de Seignelay, who had succeeded his father Colbert as naval minister, had not planned for an invasion and had thought no further than Beachy Head, writing to Tourville before the engagement – " ... I shall be content if you will let me know as soon as possible after the battle your thoughts on the employment of the fleet for the rest of the campaign". Tourville anchored off Le Havre to refit and land his sick. The French had failed to exploit their success. To the fury of Louis and Seignelay, the sum of Tourville's victory was the symbolic and futile burning of the English coastal town of Teignmouth in July. Tourville was relieved of command.

The English squadrons rallied to the main fleet. By the end of August the Allies had 90 vessels cruising the Channel and temporary French control had come to an end. Torrington had been sent to the Tower of London to await a court-martial at Chatham. The substance of the charge was that he had withdrawn and kept back, had not done his utmost to damage the French and to assist his own and the Dutch ships. Torrington blamed the defeat on the lack of naval preparations and intelligence – he had not been informed that the Brest fleet had been reinforced with the Toulon squadron. He also contended that the Dutch had engaged too early, before they had reached the head of the French line. To the outrage and astonishment of William and his ministers – and the delight of the Englishmen who regarded him as a political sacrifice to the Dutch – the court-martial acquitted him. Torrington took up his seat in the House of Lords but William refused to see him and dismissed him from the service on 12 December (O.S). Torrington was temporarily replaced by a triumvirate of Sir Henry Killigrew, John Ashby and Sir Richard Haddock. These were in turn replaced by Admiral Russell as sole commander of the English fleet.
