= Battle of Palermo =

1676 naval battle of the Franco-Dutch War

- Part of the Franco-Dutch War
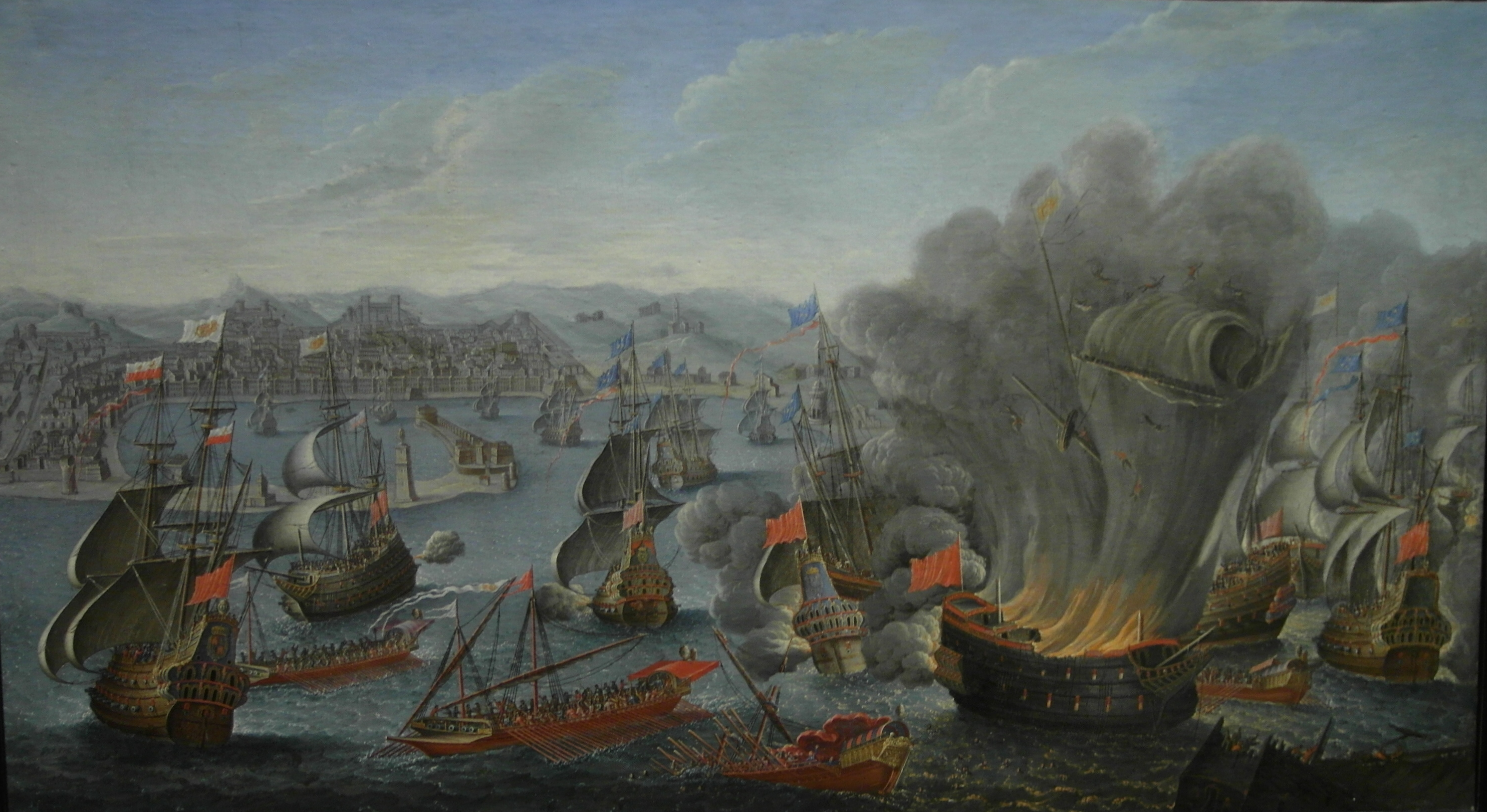
- A painting of the battle by Pierre Puget
| Date | June 2, 1676 |
| Location | Off Palermo, Mediterranean Sea 38°07′30″N 13°23′06″E |
| Result | French victory |

Belligerents
| France | Dutch Republic; Spain |

Commanders and leaders
| (Kingdom of France) Duke of Mortemart (Kingdom of France) Abraham Duquesne | Jan den Haen †; Diego de Ibarra † |

Strength
| 24 ships of the line 5 frigates 25 galleys 9 fireships | 14 ships of the line 13 frigates 19 galleys 4 fireships |

Casualties and losses
| ~200 killed and wounded 9 fireships destroyed | ~1,960 killed and wounded 3 ships of the line destroyed 4 frigates destroyed 2 galleys destroyed |

The Battle of Palermo took place on 2 June 1676 during the Franco-Dutch War, between a French force sent to support a revolt in the city of Messina against the Spanish rule in Sicily, and a Spanish force supported by a Dutch maritime expedition force.

== Background ==
The Dutch and Spanish ships were at bay making repairs from an earlier Battle of Augusta where Dutch Lt. Admiral General de Ruyter suffered lethal injuries. His death caused a severe impact on morale of the Dutch. The command of their fleet was transferred to Vice Admiral den Haen while the general command was assumed by Spanish admiral Don Diego de Ibarra. The French fleet under nominal command of Duke of Mortemart arrived from Messina. The actual planning of the battle belonged to Vice Admiral Duquesne, Rear Admiral de Tourville and Rear Admiral Gabaret. The Dutch were inclined to meet the French at sea, but they were disappointed greatly by the Spanish conduct in the previous battle. The Dutch and Spanish ships of the line and frigates were springed in a battle line order across the bay with the Spanish galleys in front of them to protect from enemy fireships. The French fleet was larger and more powerful. Many Spanish ships were of older designs equipped with low calibre cannons and incomplete untrained crews. The Dutch crews were very well trained, though also incomplete due to irrecoverable losses in the previous battles and a dysentery epidemic. The French plan was to engage in combat with the Spanish ships first, continue with the Dutch ships and coastal batteries until the bay got covered with gunpowder smoke under which the fireships should attack.

== Battle ==
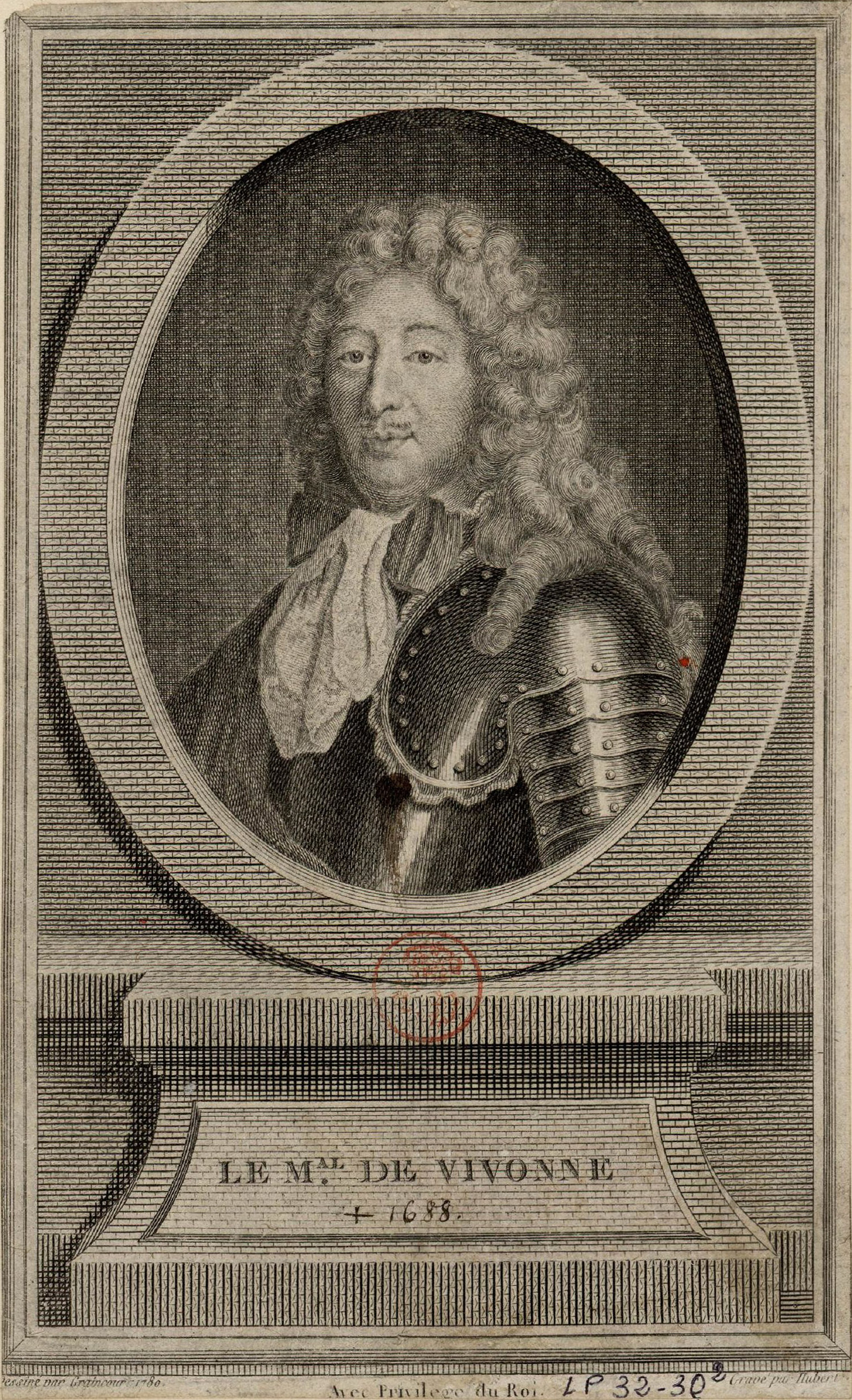
A portrait of the Duke of Mortemart

The Spanish ships couldn't maintain the battle order for a long time. Many of them cut spring ropes and left the line without order. Three Spanish frigates were burnt due to a French fireship attack. Two Spanish galleys were destroyed by artillery fire with Admiral de Villaroel killed. When Spanish resistance on the right side of the line collapsed, the French attacked the left side and centre consisting of the Dutch ships mostly with all their force. The Spanish flagship, 70-gun Nuestra Señora del Pilar, was attacked by four French fireships, caught fire and exploded with 200 sailors and both Spanish admirals, de Ibarra and de La Cerda, killed. The majority of Dutch losses could be attributed to another successful French fireship attack on the 68-gun Steenbergen which collided with two other Dutch ships, 50-gun Vrijheid and 36-gun Leiden, in a failed evasive manoeuvre. All three Dutch ships caught fire and exploded, though most of their crews escaped successfully. Rear Admiral van Middelandt was killed on board Steenbergen. The Dutch continued to resist though. Vice Admiral den Haen was killed by a cannonball while commanding his flagship, 76-gun Gouda. With all Dutch and Spanish admirals killed, a flag officer of late de Ruyter, Captain Callenburgh of 76-gun Eendracht, assumed general command. One of Spanish coastal batteries exploded and the town caught fire. The Dutch and Spanish were in a dire position, though the French lost all their fireships by this time and Vivonne ordered a return to Messina.

== Aftermath ==
It could be argued the French would have been able to achieve a complete destruction of the allied Dutch and Spanish fleet at the cost of higher French losses. However, Vivonne decided the battle had been won already and it was better to return without losing a single warship. The French victory achieved little, and the French forces in Sicily were recalled on 1 January 1678. As in the Franco-Spanish War of 1635–1659, in the Franco-Dutch War Spain retained its position in Italy and proved able to thwart French hopes of major gains.

== Order of battle ==
=== France ===
- 24 ships of the line (50 to 80 guns)
- 5 frigates (38 to 46 guns)
- 25 galleys
- 9 fireships

==== Vanguard (Duquesne) ====
- Fortune 56 (Marquis d'Amfreville)
- Aimable 56 (Monsieur de La Barre)
- Saint-Esprit 72 (Vice Admiral Duquesne)
- Grand 72 (Monsieur de Beaulieu)
- Joli 46 (Monsieur de Belle-Isle)
- Éclatant 60 (Marquis de Coëtlogon)
- Mignon 46 (Monsieur de Relingues)
- Aquilon 50 (Monsieur de Montreuil)
- Vaillant 54 (Monsieur de Septesme)
- Parfait 60 (Monsieur de Chasteneuf)

==== Main force (Vivonne) ====
- Sceptre 80 (Duke of Mortemart, Rear Admiral Count de Tourville)
- Pompeux 72 (Chevalier de Valbelle)
- Saint Michel 60 (Marquis de Preuilly d'Humiéres)
- Agréable 56 (Monsieur d'Ailly)
- Téméraire 50 (Chevalier de Lhery)
- Syrène 46 (Chevalier de Béthune)
- Assuré 56 (Marquis de Villette-Mursay)
- Brusque 46 (Chevalier de La Motte)
- Sage 54 (Marquis de Langeron)
- Fier 60 (Monsieur de Chabert)

==== Rearguard (Gabaret) ====
- Lys 74 (Rear Admiral Gabaret)
- Heureux 54 (Monsieur de La Bretesche)
- Apollon 54 (Chevalier de Forbin)
- Trident 38 (Chevalier de Bellefontaine)
- Sans-Pareil 70 (Monsieur de Châteauneuf)
- Magnifique 72 (Monsieur de La Gravière)
- Vermandois 50 (Monsieur de La Porte)
- Prudent 54 (Monsieur de La Fayette)
- Fidèle 56 (Chevalier de Cogolin)

=== Netherlands ===
- Vrijheid 50 (Adam van Brederode) – blown up
- Stad en Lande 54 (Joris Andringa)
- Spiegel 70 (Gilles Schey)
- Provincie van Utrecht 60 (Jan de Jong)
- Steenbergen 68 (Rear Admiral Pieter van Middelandt, killed) – blown up
- Kraanvogel 46 (Jacob Willemszoon Broeder)
- Zuiderhuis 46 (Pieter de Sitter)
- Gouda 76 (Vice Admiral Jan den Haen, killed)
- Leeuwen 50 (Frans Willem, Graaf van Stierum)
- Damiaten 34 (Isaac van Uitterwijk)
- Edam 34 (Cornelis van der Zaan)
- Groenwijf 36 (Juriaan Baak)
- Eendracht 76 (Gerard Callenburgh)
- Oosterwijk 60 (Jacob Teding van Berkhout)
- Harderwijk 46 (Mattheus Megang)
- Leiden 36 (Jan van Abkoude) – blown up
- Wakende Boei 46 (Cornelis Tijloos)

=== Spain ===
- Nuestra Señora del Pilar (Capitana Real) 64/74 (1000–1100 crew) Almirante Don Diego de Ibarra (killed) – blown up
- Santiago (Nueva Real) 80
- San Antonio de Napoles 44/46 (500 crew) – burnt
- San Felipe 40/44 – burnt
- San Carlo/Salvator delle Fiandre/San Salvador (Almiranta de Flandres) 40/42/48 (350 crew) – burnt
- San Joaquin/San Juan 80
- San Gabriel 40
- Santa Ana 54/60 – probably burnt and salvaged
- Nuestra Señora del Rosario 50
- Nuestra Señora de Guadalupe, probable
- Nuestra Señora del Rosario y Las Animas, probable
- 19 galleys, including San Jose (Almirante Juan de Villaroel, killed), sunk, and San Salvador, sunk
