= Abraham Duquesne =

French naval officer

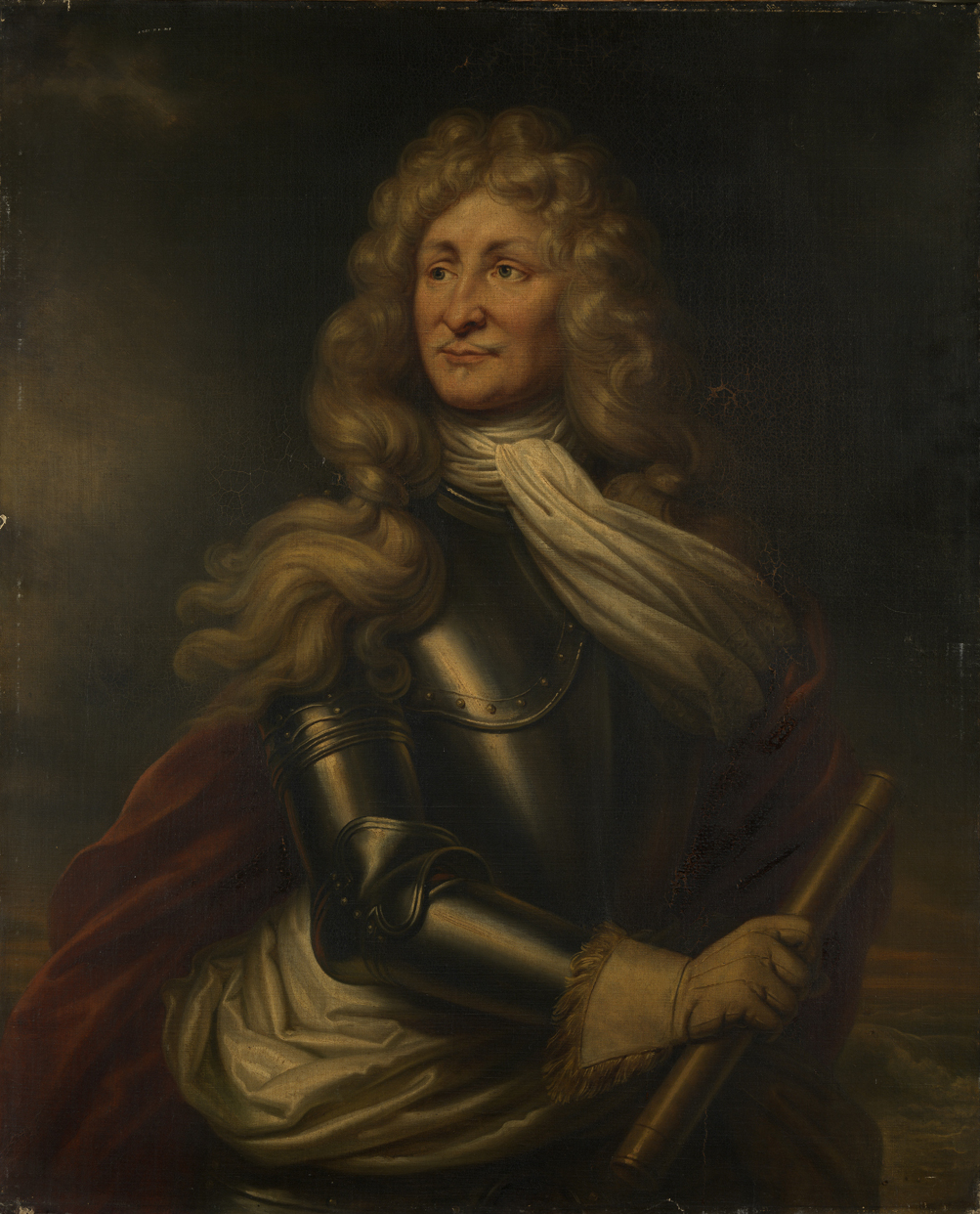
- 1838 portrait by Alexander Joseph von Steuben
- Born: 1610; Dieppe, Normandy
- Died: 2 February 1688 (aged 77–78); Paris, France
- Military career
- Allegiance: France; Sweden (1643 – 1645)
- Branch: French Navy; Swedish Navy
- Rank: Vice admiral
- Conflicts: Franco-Spanish War; Battle of Guetaria; Battle of Tarragona; Battle of Barcelona; Torstenson War; Battle of Colberger Heide; Battle of Fehmarn Belt; Franco-Dutch War; Battle of Solebay; Battle of Stromboli; Battle of Agosta; Battle of Palermo; War of the Reunions; Bombardment of Genoa; Franco-Algerian war (1681–1688)

Vice-Admiral Abraham Duquesne, marquis du Bouchet (French pronunciation: [abʁa.am dykɛn]; c. 1610 – 2 February 1688) was a French naval officer, who also saw service as an admiral in the Swedish navy. He was born in Dieppe, a seaport, in 1610, and was a Huguenot. He was the son of a naval officer and therefore became a sailor himself, spending his early years in merchant service.

Born into a Huguenot family in the early 17th century, he first went to sea under his father’s command, a ship’s captain. He served under King of France Louis XIII during the Thirty Years’ War and distinguished himself on several occasions, particularly in the battles of Tarragona and Cartagena, but was forced to leave the navy in 1644 after losing a ship.

During the turbulent early regency of Louis XIV, who would later be known as the Sun King, he secured Cardinal Mazarin’s permission to serve in the Swedish Royal Navy alongside his brother. He fought in the Torstenson War between Sweden and Denmark and made his mark at the Battle of Fehmarn, capturing the flagship of the Danish commander Pros Mund.

Returning to France, he rejoined the French Royal Navy and was sent in 1669 to relieve Candia, then under siege by the Turks. He took part in the Franco-Dutch War (1672–1678), fighting at the battles of Solebay (1672) and Stromboli (January 1676). But it was at the battles of Augusta (April 1676) and Palermo that he truly stood out. He ended his career as a lieutenant general of the naval forces, his advancement hindered by his refusal to renounce his Protestant faith despite pressure from the Sun King and his advisors, including Colbert and Bossuet.

== Service in the French navy ==
In 1635, he became a capitaine de vaisseau (captain) in the French navy. He was appointed to the "Neptune" squadron in 1636. In May 1637, he gained some fame for capturing the island of Lerins from Spain. Around this time, his father died in a conflict with the Spanish, which permanently increased his animosity towards them and he sought revenge. He fought them viciously at the Battle of Guetaria in 1638, during the expedition to Corunna in 1639, and in the battles at Tarragona in 1641, Barcelona and the Cabo de Gata (also called in English battle of Cartagena).

== Service in the Swedish navy ==
Duquesne then left to join the Swedish Navy in 1643. He fought the Danish fleet personally commanded by King Christian IV at the Battle of Colberger Heide in the frigate Regina 34. Later, in the Battle of Fehmarn Belt, the Danes were decisively defeated, their admiral Pros Mund killed and his ship taken. After a peace had been reached between the Danes and the Swedes in 1645, he returned to France.

== Return to French service ==
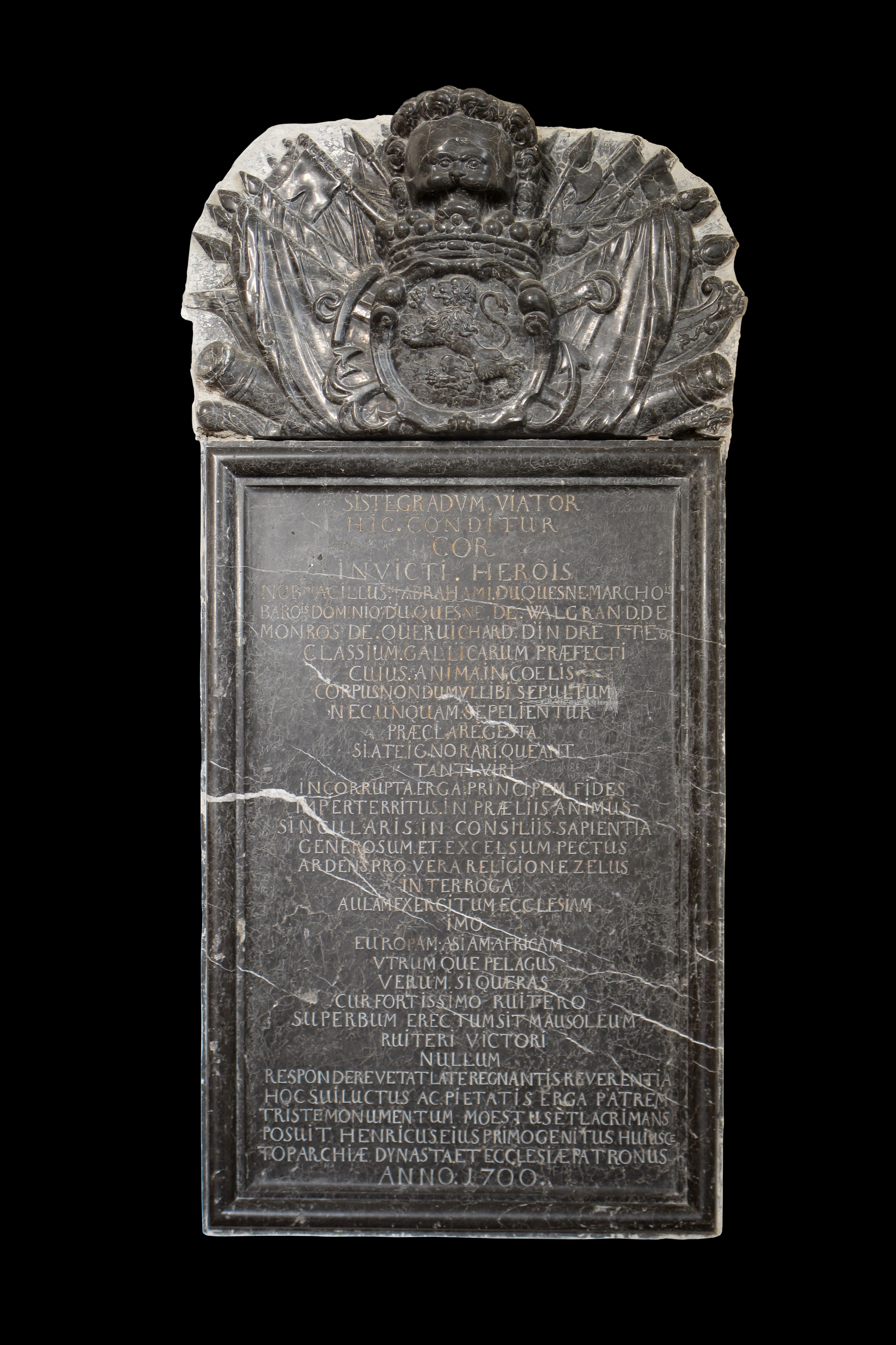
Plaque and heart of Admiral Duquesne

He suppressed a revolt at Bordeaux (which was materially supported by his most hated foe, the Spanish) in 1650, during the Fronde outbreaks. During that same year, he created at his own expense a squadron with which he blockaded the Gironde, forcing that city to surrender. This earned him a promotion in rank to chef d'escadre (Rear-Admiral), a castle, and a gift of the entire isle of Indre, Loire-Atlantique. The French and the Spanish made peace in 1659, which left him to fight pirates in the Mediterranean Sea. In 1667 he was promoted 'Lieutenant-Général (Vice-Admiral). He distinguished himself in the Third Dutch War, fighting as second in command of the French squadron at the Battle of Solebay and later supporting the insurgents in the revolt of Messina from Spain, fighting Admiral Michel Adriaanzoon de Ruyter, who had the united fleets of Spain and the United Provinces under his command. He fought the combined Dutch-Spanish fleet at the Battle of Stromboli and the Battle of Augusta where De Ruyter was mortally wounded. On 2 June he was present as second in command when the French fleet under Comte and Vivonne attacked and partly destroyed the combined Spanish-Dutch fleet at the Battle of Palermo, which secured French control of the Mediterranean. For this accomplishment he received a personal letter from Louis XIV and was given, in 1681, the title of marquis along with the estate of Bouchet, even though he was a Protestant.

Duquesne also fought the Barbary pirates in 1681 and bombarded Algiers between 1682 and 1683. In response the Algerians tied the French consul Jean Le Vacher to their huge Baba Merzoug cannon and blasted him towards the French fleet in July 1683. Another French consul received the same treatment in 1688, and the cannon became known as La Consulaire. Duquesne bombarded Genoa in 1684.

== Last years ==
In that same year, 1684, he retired from poor health. He may have foreseen the revocation of the Edict of Nantes in 1685, though he was exempted from the proscription. He died in Paris on 2 February 1688.

Abraham's heart was placed in a silver box and sent to Aubonne, Switzerland after his death. More than a hundred years later in 1894 the box was discovered and moved to his birthplace in Dieppe.

== Legacy ==
The Marquis Duquesne de Menneville, another famous mariner, was his grandnephew. Eight vessels of the Royal French Navy have been named in his honour, see French ship Duquesne

Duquesne has been played on screen by Filip Peeters in the film Michiel de Ruyter (film) (2015)
