= Battle of Stromboli =

1676 battle during Franco-Dutch War

Coordinates: 38.5375°N 14.4239°E

- Part of the Franco-Dutch War
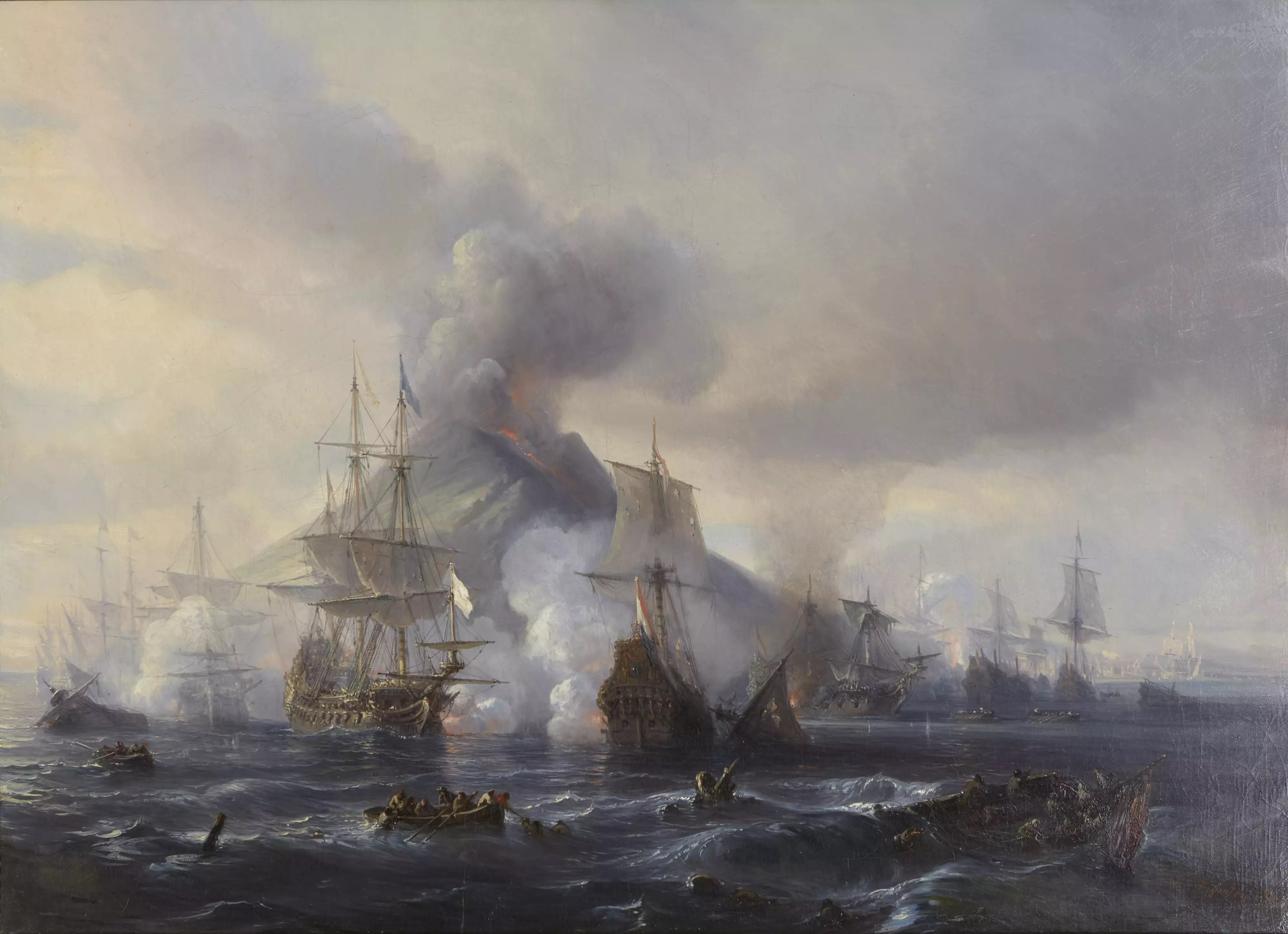
- Painting of the battle by Théodore Gudin
Date	8 January 1676
Location	Off Stromboli, Mediterranean Sea
Result	Indecisive

Belligerents
Dutch Republic; Spain	France

Commanders and leaders
Michiel de Ruyter	Abraham Duquesne

Strength
19 ships of the line or frigates 6 snows 5 fire ships 1,200 guns 4,800 men	20 ships of the line 6 fireships 1,500 guns 7,200 men

Casualties and losses
240 killed or wounded 1 ship of the line sunk	400 killed or wounded

The Battle of Stromboli, also known as the Second Battle of Stromboli or the Battle of Alicudi, took place on 8 January, 1676, during the Franco-Dutch War. The battle occurred between a French fleet of 20 ships under Abraham Duquesne and a combined fleet of 19 allied ships (18 Dutch and one Spanish ship) under Lieutenant-Admiral-General Michiel de Ruyter. It lasted eight hours and ended inconclusively. The fleets fought again several months later at the Battle of Augusta in April.

== Background ==
At the end of the Franco-Spanish War, the Treaty of the Pyrenees in 1659 provided for Louis XIV to marry Maria Theresa, the eldest daughter of Philip IV of Spain, who was to bring a substantial dowry to Louis and who renounced her right to inherit the Spanish throne. The dowry was never paid. On the death of Philip IV in September 1665, his infant son Charles II of Spain the child of Philip's second wife Mariana of Austria was proclaimed king. Mariana's nearest male relative, the Emperor Leopold might therefore have had a claim to the Spanish throne if Charles died childless, so Louis therefore claimed that, since Maria Theresa's dowry had not been paid, her renunciation was invalid, and under an obscure Netherlands law, that as child of Philip IV's she rather than Charles II should have inherited, and that Maria Theresa's rights "devolved" to him as her husband. The French invasion of the Spanish Netherlands in 1667 in the War of Devolution was initially very successful, with the ending of the Second Anglo-Dutch War, the Dutch began discussions with England and Sweden on creating a diplomatic alliance to protect Spain against France. The subsequent the Treaty of Aix-la-Chapelle signed in May 1668 gave Louis XIV much less Spanish territory than he had expected, and his resentment of the Dutch intervention decided him to detach England and Sweden from their alliance with the Dutch and prepare for war against the United Netherlands.

France then invaded the United Netherlands in May 1672, initiating the Franco-Dutch War. Louis however refused a Dutch offer of very favourable peace terms made in June 1672, and the Dutch retreated behind the Dutch Water Line, a barrier of inundations, and prepared to resist the French by land and sea. In July 1674, the city of Messina in Sicily had revolted against Spanish rule and then asked for French protection. A small French squadron with a few troops and limited food supplies was sent to Messina in September 1674, but it withdrew before the year end in the face of a Spanish fleet of 22 ships and numerous galleys. A stronger French force of 20 ships, including nine ships of the line, and supply convoy managed to break through the Spanish blockade and defeat the more numerous Spanish fleet in a battle off the Lipari Islands on 11 February 1675, capturing one Spanish warship, and it brought the Spanish blockade of Messina to an end and provided considerable food supplies to the city. This battle is sometimes referred to as the First Battle of Stromboli.

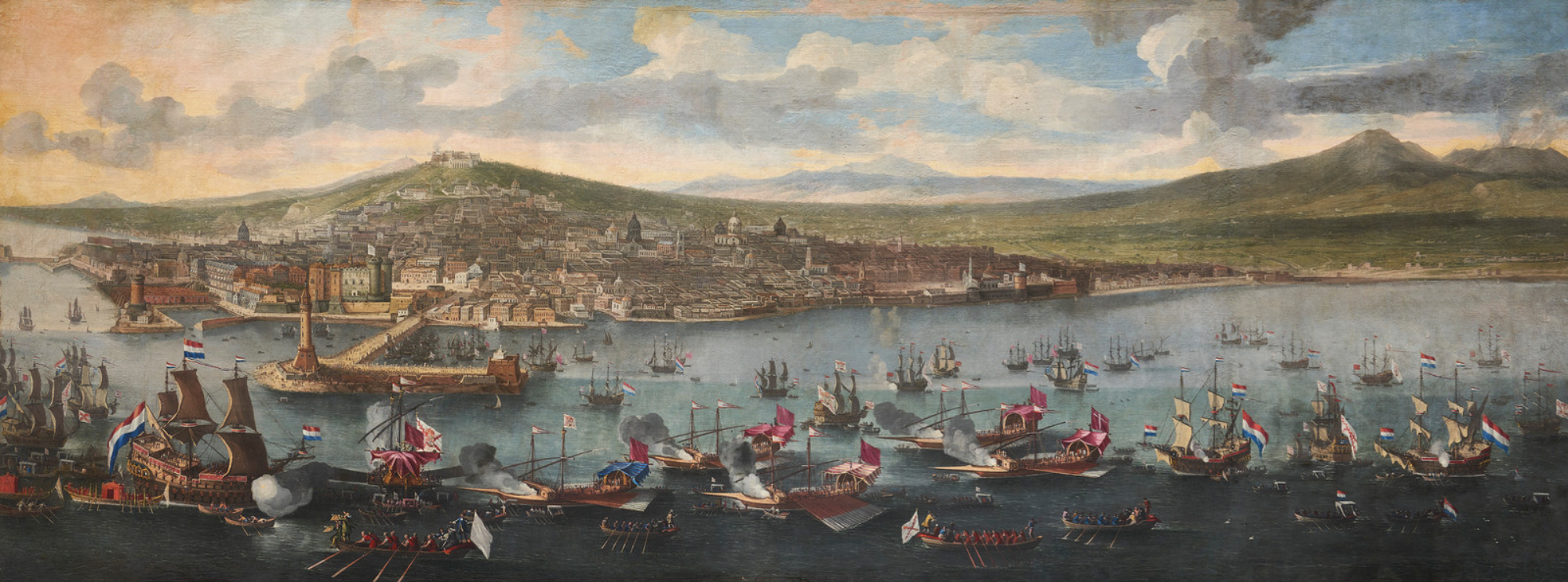
The Viceroy of Naples paying tribute to de Ruyter's fleet in the port of Naples, by Jan van Essen, 1676

The Spanish then asked for Dutch assistance. Michiel de Ruyter was sent to the Mediterranean with eighteen larger warships and a number of smaller vessels although, because Dutch resources had been strained by the continuing Franco-Dutch War, these were not fully manned and de Ruyter thought the force was insufficient. After waiting for two months on the Spanish coast for the supplies promised by the Spanish authorities and for a Spanish squadron to join him, de Ruyter sailed for Sicily at the year end with only one Spanish ship added to his fleet. This delay may have saved Messina, as its food supplies were short and, had de Ruyter not been delayed, the Dutch fleet may have prevented its reprovisioning. The news that de Ruyter was on his way prompted the French viceroy of Messina, firstly to send a force to attack Augusta by land and sea, as its capture would deny the Dutch a suitable harbour near Messina and, secondly, to send Duquesne to France to escort a convoy that would reprovision Messina.

At the time of de Ruyter arrival in Sicily in early January 1676, most of the larger French warships were absent from Messina with Duquesne, who was escorting the convoy to Sicily, and only the smaller ones remained at Messina under Lieutenant-Général Guillaume d'Alméras. However, de Ruyter was unable to attack Messina because of contrary winds and, on 7 January 1676, while cruising near the Lipari Islands, he encountered the French fleet led by Duquesne and the convoy it was escorting.

== Battle ==
The French aimed to bring the convoy into Messina intact and to preserve their fleet as a fighting force whereas the Dutch wished to prevent the fleet and convoy reaching Messina or to do as much damage to them as possible. Although ship numbers on both sides were similar, the French fleet was more powerful, with 1,500 guns against 1,200 for the Dutch On 7 January, de Ruyter had held the weather gauge, but either he did not attack on that day, or Duquesne foiled his attack by remaining out of range. However, during the night the wind veered to a west-southwesterly direction and, as both fleets were heading almost due south, it now favoured the French. The wind had also strengthened overnight, so the Spanish galleys had taken refuge in the lee of the Lipari Islands: Duquesne therefore sent the convoy ahead and prepared to attack the Dutch. Each fleet comprised three squadrons with its commander in the centre. The French van was commanded by Marquis de Preuilly d'Humières, a chef d'escadre and the rear by Louis Gabaret, another chef d'escadre. The Dutch Third Squadron led the Dutch fleet, commanded by its Schout-bij-nacht, Nikolaas Verschoor, with Vice-Admiral Jan den Haan commanding the First squadron in the rear.

From about 9am, Duquesne's ships steered obliquely towards the Dutch fleet, a tactic that exposed them to Dutch broadside fire to which they could only respond with a few guns. De Ruyter's van and centre reacted by gradually giving way so that their French opponents could not get close to them and remained at a disadvantage, subject to full Dutch broadsides. The two French ships at the front of Preuilly d'Humières, van, Prudent and Parfait suffered most severely from heavy Dutch fire during their oblique approach, and both had to pull out of the line of battle, disordering the van, masking the fire of some if its ships and causing their commander in Saint Michel to be exposed to the simultaneous fire of several Dutch warships. Although Duquesne was wounded, he managed to restore order to the van and tried several times to break the Dutch line with the French van and centre, although de Ruyter's close linear formation, his manoeuvering and the weight of Dutch broadsides prevented this.

To the rear, some vessels in Gabaret's squadron were mishandled and ran into one another and the French rear as a whole failed to close with den Haan's ships. Den Haan's squadron, which had initially been a greater distance from Gabaret's squadron than the rest of the Dutch fleet was from its opponents, maintained a steady course instead of giving way, so a gap developed between it and de Ruyter's centre. However, as the wind had become very light during the day, the French could not exploit this gap. After about six hours of fighting, the two fleets were on parallel courses, sailing south-southwest in a very light breeze, and firing ceased in the van and centre, although it continued between the two rear squadrons for some hours longer. Three badly damaged Dutch ships were towed by Spanish galleys into Milazzo, and de Ruyter disengaged and took his fleet into Milazzo as well. He had successfully defended his inferior fleet in a tactically disadvantageous leeward position and inflicted significant damage on the French fleet.

== Aftermath ==
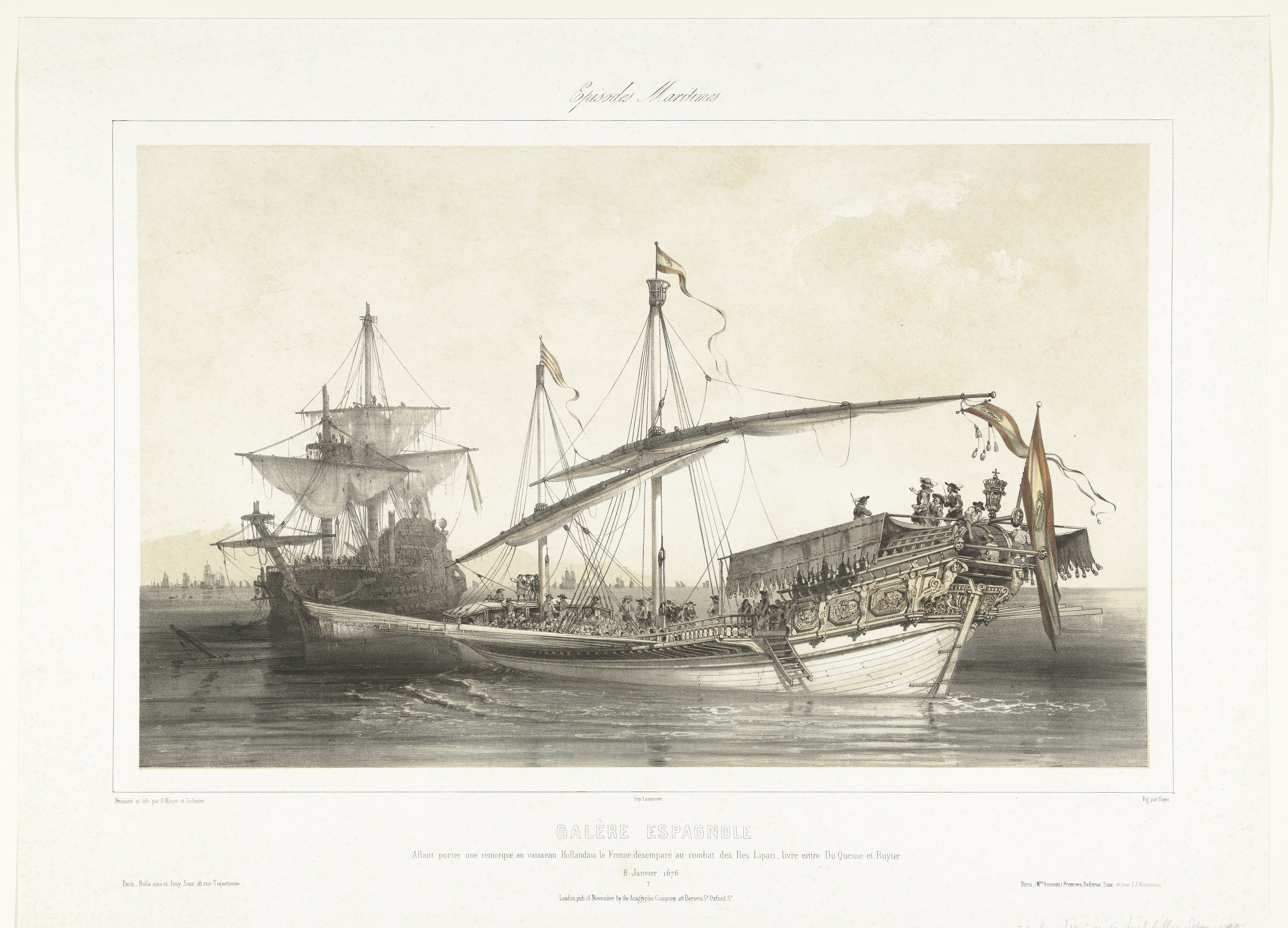
19th century depiction of a Spanish galley towing a rudderless Dutch ship after the battle.

Both sides had suffered significant damage to many ships and the Dutch Essen from Verschoor's Third Squadron sank the next day. However, the Dutch had inflicted more casualties on the French during their oblique approach. During the night, the wind strengthened, and Duquesne was joined by d'Alméras with eight ships from Messina, but the next day the Spanish squadron was sighted and Duquesne did not wish to fight an action against superior numbers in the Strait of Messina encumbered by a convoy, so he took his convoy right around Sicily, but succeeded in bringing it into Messina without further fighting. The combined Dutch-Spanish fleet sailed to Palermo for repairs, and there were no further fleet actions for several months.

== Order of battle ==
France (Duquesne)

=== Avant-garde (Preuilly d'Humières) ===
- Prudent 54 (Chevalier de La Fayette)
- Parfait 60 (Monsieur de Chasteneuf)
- Saint Michel 60 (Marquis de Preuilly d'Humières, chef d'escadre)
- Fier 48 (Monsieur de Chabert)
- Mignon 46 (Monsieur de Relingues)
- Assuré 56 (Philippe Le Valois, Marquis de Villette-Mursay)

=== Corps de bataille (Duquesne) ===
- Sage 54 (Marquis de Langeron)
- Syrène 46 (Chevalier de Bèthune)
- Pompeux 72 (Chevalier de Valbelle, chef d'escadre)
- Saint Esprit 72 (Lt-general Abraham Du Quesne, commander-in-chief)
- Sceptre 80 (Chevalier de Tourville)
- Éclatant 60 (Monsieur de Coux)
- Téméraire 54 (Chevalier de L'Hery)
- Aimable 56 (Monsieur de La Barre)

=== Arriere-garde (Gabaret) ===
- Vaillant 54 (Monsieur de Sptesme)
- Apollon 52 (Chevalier de Forbin)
- Grand 72 (Monsieur de Beaulieu)
- Sans Pareil 70 (Louis Gabaret, chef d'escadre, captain Allain Emmanuel de Coëtlogon)
- Aquilon 50 (Monsieur de Villeneuve-Ferrieres)
- Magnifique 72 (Monsieur De La Gravier)

=== Attached fireships (names unknown) ===
- fireship (Chevalier de Beauvoisis)
- fireship (Chevalier de La Galissonière)
- fireship (cpt. Champagne)
- fireship (cpt. Honorat)
- fireship (cpt. Despretz)
- fireship (cpt. Serpaut)

Netherlands/Spain (Michiel de Ruyter)

=== First Squadron (De Haan) ===
- Provincie van Utrecht 60 (Jan de Jong)
- Vrijheid 50 (Adam van Brederode)
- Gouda 76 (Vice-Admiral Jan de Haan)
- Wakende Boei 46 (Cornelis Tijloos)
- Edam 34 (Cornelis van der Zaan)
- Kraanvogel 46 (Jacob Willemszoon Broeder)
- Rouaan 8 (snow, Willem Knijf)
- Roos 8 (snow, Juriaan Baak)
- Sint Salvador 6 (fireship, Jan Janszoon Bont)
- Zwarte Tas 4 (fireship, Jacob Stadtlander)
- Witte Tas 4 (supply ship, Adriaan van Esch)

=== Second Squadron (De Ruyter) ===
- Steenbergen 68 (Pieter van Middelandt)
- Leeuwen 50 (Frans Willem, Graaf van Stierum)
- Eendracht 76 (Lt-Admiral Michiel De Ruyter)
- Stad en Lande 54 (Joris Andringa)
- Zuiderhuis 46 (Pieter de Sitter)
- Leiden 36 (Jan van Abkoude)
- Tonijn 8 (snow, Philips Melkenbeek)
- Kreeft 8 (snow, Wijbrand Barendszoon)
- Salm 4 (fireship, Jan van Kampen)
- Melkmeisje 4 (fireship, Arent Ruyghaver)

=== Third Squadron (Vershoor) ===
- Oosterwijk 60 (Jacob Teding van Berkhout)
- Harderwijk 46 (Mattheus Megang)
- Spiegel 70 (Nikolaas Verschoor, killed)
- Essen 50 (Gilles Schey) - Sunk on 9 June
- Damiaten 34 (Isaac van Uitterwijk)
- Groenwijf 36 (Jan Noirot)
- Ter Goes 8 (snow, Abraham Wilmerdonk)
- Prinsen Wapen 8 (snow, Hendrik Walop)
- Jakob en Anna 4 (fireship, Dirk Klaaszoon Harney)
- Nuestra Señora del Rosario 50 (Spanish. Capt. Mateo de Laya y Cabex)

The combined fleet was also accompanied by a number of Spanish galleys.

== Bibliography ==
=== References ===
- Blackmore, David (2014). Warfare on the Mediterranean in the Age of Sail: A History, 1571–1866. McFarland. ISBN 978-0786457847.
- Carsten, F. L. (1961). The New Cambridge Modern History: Volume 5, The Ascendancy of France, 1648-88. McFarland. ISBN 978-0521045445.
- Israel, J. I. (1995). The Dutch Republic: Its Rise, Greatness, and Fall, 1477–1806. MacDonald and Jane's. ISBN 978-0786457847.
- Jenkins, E. H. (1973). A History of the French Navy. MacDonald and Jane's. ISBN 978-0356041964.
- Lynn, John (1996). The Wars of Louis XIV, 1667–1714 (Modern Wars in Perspective). OUP. ISBN 978-0198730729.
- Rommelse, Gijs (2006). The Second Anglo-Dutch War (1665–1667). Verloren. ISBN 978-9065509079.
- Winfield, Rif; Roberts, Stephen (2017). French Warships in the Age of Sail 1626–1786: Design, Construction, Careers and Fates. Seaforth Publishing. ISBN 978-1473893511.
- Sweetman, Jack, ed. (1997). The great admirals: command at sea, 1587-1945. Naval Institute Press. ISBN 978-0-87021-229-1.
- Blok, P.J. (1928). Michiel de Ruyter (PDF) (in Dutch). Martinus Nijhof.
