= Philips van der Goes =

Dutch military officer

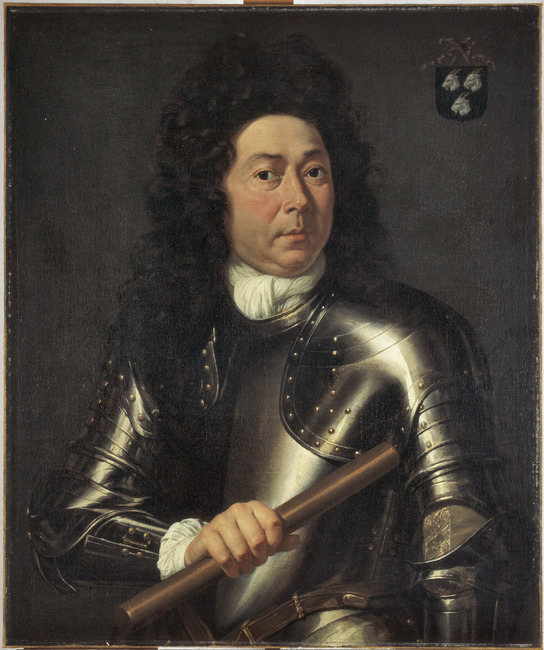
- Philips van der Goes

Schout-bij-nacht of Rotterdam
- In office 1691–1697

Vice Admiral of Rotterdam
- In office 1697–1707

Personal details
- Born: 1651 Delft, Dutch Republic
- Died: 7 July 1707 (aged 55–56) Var, Savoy

Military service
- Allegiance: Dutch Republic
- Rank: Admiral
- Battles/wars: Franco-Dutch War; Nine Years' War; Battle of Beachy Head; Battle of La Hogue; Battle of Lagos; War of the Spanish Succession; Battle of Vigo Bay

Philips van der Goes (1651 – 9 July 1707) was a Dutch military officer during the 17th and 18th centuries. He took part in the Nine Years' War and the War of the Spanish Succession and ended his military career at the rank of vice-admiral.

== Biography ==
Van der Goes became captain in the Dutch States Army before joining the Dutch States Navy in 1678. In that year he became a captain of the Admiralty of Amsterdam. He commanded the 68-gun ship of the line Friesland at the Battle of Beachy Head on 10 July 1690, where the ship was captured and burned by the French. In the following year he was given command of the 92-gun ship of the line Keurvorst van Brandenburg, and was promoted to rear-admiral in the Admiralty of Rotterdam. In 1697 he was promoted to vice-admiral. He participated in the Nine Years' War and distinguished himself in the Battle of La Hougue on 29 May 1692. His ship had to endure a fierce fire and was badly damaged while Van der Goes himself was slightly injured. The following year, he commanded the Dutch squadron in the Allied fleet under English Admiral Sir George Rooke, which escorting a convoy of merchant ships, was attacked at the Battle of Lagos by a far bigger French fleet under Anne Hilarion de Tourville. In 1694, under Philips van Almonde, he took part in naval operations against the French and in 1695 he commanded the North Sea squadron.

During the War of the Spanish Succession, he took part in the Battle of Vigo Bay on 23 October 1702, in which the Anglo-Dutch fleet destroyed the Franco-Spanish fleet, which was protecting the Spanish silver fleet. He played an important part in the battle. His 92-gun ship, Zeven Provinciën, broke into the bay second only to the ship of Thomas Hopsonn and captured the 68-gun Bourbon. His flagship in 1703 was the 90-gun ship of the line Beschermer. In 1704 he again assumed command of the North Sea Squadron which protected the Dutch herring fleets and defeated the Dunkirk Privateers. In 1706, he was transferred to the command of the Dutch Mediterranean squadron, again sailing in Beschermer, but soon died aboard his ship on 9 July 1707 at the mouth of the Var River, aged 56. He was buried in Nice.

== Sources ==
- Van der Aa, Abraham Jacob (1852). "Philips van der Goes". Biographisch woordenboek der Nederlanden. Deel 7.
- Bender, James; Davies, J. D. (2014). Dutch Warships in the Age of Sail 1600–1714. Barnsley, South Yorkshire: Seaforth. ISBN 9781473852877.
- Blok, P.J.; Molhuysen, P.C. (1921). "GOES, Philips van der". Nieuw Nederlandsch biografisch woordenboek. Deel 5.
- De Jonge, Cornelis (1861). Geschiedenis van het Nederlandsche zeewezen deel 4. A.C. Kruseman.
- De Jonge, Cornelis (1860). Geschiedenis van het Nederlandsche zeewezen deel 3. A.C. Kruseman.

Media related to Philips van der Goes at Wikimedia Commons
