= List of ship launches in 1692 =

The list of ship launches in 1692 includes a chronological list of some ships launched in 1692.

Date	Ship	Class	Builder	Location	Country	Notes
24 February	Vainqueur	Second rate	Laurent Coulomb	Lorient	Kingdom of France	For French Navy.
5 April	Devonshire	Third rate	Wyatt	Bursledon	England	For Royal Navy.
21 April	Royal William	First rate	Robert Lee, Chatham Dockyard	Chatham	England	For Royal Navy.
23 April	Breda	Third rate	Lawrence, Woolwich Dockyard	Woolwich	England	For Royal Navy.
23 April	Cornwall	Third rate	Winter	Southampton	England	For Royal Navy.
April	Fleur de Lis	Unrated galley	Jean-Baptiste Chabert	Marseille	Kingdom of France	For French Navy.
21 May	Boyne	Third rate	Harding, Deptford Dockyard	Deptford	England	For Royal Navy.
3 June	Russell	Third rate	Stigant, Portsmouth Dockyard	Portsmouth	England	For Royal Navy.
22 September	Royal Louis	First rate	François Coulomb	Toulon	Kingdom of France	For French Navy.
September	Capable	Fourth rate	Rene Levasseur	Dunkerque	Kingdom of France	For French Navy.
7 October	Phénix	Third rate	François Coulomb	Toulon	Kingdom of France	For French Navy.
22 October	Indien	Fifth rate	Pierre-Blaise Coulomb	Lorient	Kingdom of France	For French Navy.
October	Dannebroge	First rate	H. Span	Copenhagen	Denmark	For Royal Danish Navy.
17 November	Bourbon	Second rate	François Coulomb	Toulon	Kingdom of France	For French Navy.
23 November	Magnifique	Second rate	Honoré Mallet	Rochefort	Kingdom of France	For French Navy.
5 December	Ambitieux	First rate	Arsenal de Rochefort	Rochefort	Kingdom of France	For French Navy.
10 December	Saint Louis	Second rate	Philippe Cochois	Le Havre	Kingdom of France	For French Navy.
23 December	Admirable	First rate	Lorient Dockyard	Lorient	Kingdom of France	For French Navy.
24 December	Soleil-Royal	First rate	Étienne Hubac	Brest	Kingdom of France	For French Navy.
25 December	Prompt	Second rate	René Levasseur	Dunkerque	Kingdom of France	For French Navy.
Unknown date	Batavia	Sixth rate	Amsterdam Naval Yard	Amsterdam	Dutch Republic	For Dutch Republic Navy.
Unknown date	Batavier	Sixth rate		Dunkerque	Kingdom of France	For Dutch Republic Navy.
Unknown date	Beschutter	Fifth rate frigate	Hendrik Cardinaal, Amsterdam Naval Yard	Amsterdam	Dutch Republic	For Dutch Republic Navy.
Unknown date	Bizarre	Second rate	Félix Arnaud	Bayonne	Kingdom of France	For French Navy.
Unknown date	Bommel	Sixth rate frigate	Hendrik Cardinaal, Amsterdam Naval Yard	Amsterdam	Dutch Republic	For Dutch Republic Navy.
Unknown date	Bredrlijke Leifde	Galiot			Dutch Republic	For Dutch Republic Navy.
Unknown date	Dordrecht	Second rate	van Leeuwen	Rotterdam	Dutch Republic	For Dutch Republic Navy.
Unknown date	Drakestein	Fourth rate	Hendrik Cardinaal, Amsterdam Naval Yard	Amsterdam	Dutch Republic	For Dutch Republic Navy.
Unknown date	Gouda	Second rate		Amsterdam	Dutch Republic	For Dutch Republic Navy.
Unknown date	Groningen	Fourth rate			Dutch Republic	For Dutch Republic Navy.
Unknown date	Heusden	Fourth rate	van Leeuwen	Rotterdam	Dutch Republic	For Dutch Republic Navy.
Unknown date	Hollandia	Second rate	van Leeuwen	Rotterdam	Dutch Republic	For Dutch Republic Navy.
Unknown date	Favori	Fifth rate frigate	François Arnaud	Bayonne	Kingdom of France	For French Navy.
Unknown date	Reigersbergen	Second rate			Dutch Republic	For Dutch Republic Navy.
Unknown date	Roeigalei	Fourth rate			Dutch Republic	For Dutch Republic Navy.
Unknown date	Rozendaal	Fifth rate frigate	van Leeuwen	Rotterdam	Dutch Republic	For Dutch Republic Navy.
Unknown date	Slot van Muiden	Third rate	Hendrik Cardinaal, Amsterdam Naval Yard	Amsterdam	Dutch Republic	For Dutch Republic Navy.
Unknown date	Unie	First rate	Hendrik Cardinaal, Amsterdam Naval Yard	Amsterdam	Dutch Republic	For Dutch Republic Navy.
Unknown date	Wakende Boei	Sixth rate		Dunkerque	Kingdom of France	For Dutch Republic Navy.
Unknown date	Wassenaar	Second rate	van Leeuwen	Rotterdam	Dutch Republic	For Dutch Republic Navy.
Unknown date	Wolf	Fifth rate	Hendrik Cardinaal, Amsterdam Naval Yard	Amsterdam	Dutch Republic	For Dutch Republic Navy.
Unknown date	Zeerijp	Sixth rate		Dunkerque	Kingdom of France	For Dutch Republic Navy.
