= Châteaurenault =

Châteaurenault may refer to:

- François Louis Rousselet de Châteaurenault (1637–1716), French admiral and marshal
- French ship Châteaurenault, several French naval vessels named after the admiral
- Château-Renault, a commune in Indre-et-Loire, France
