= Battle of Vigo Bay =

1702 battle of the War of the Spanish Succession

- Part of the War of the Spanish Succession
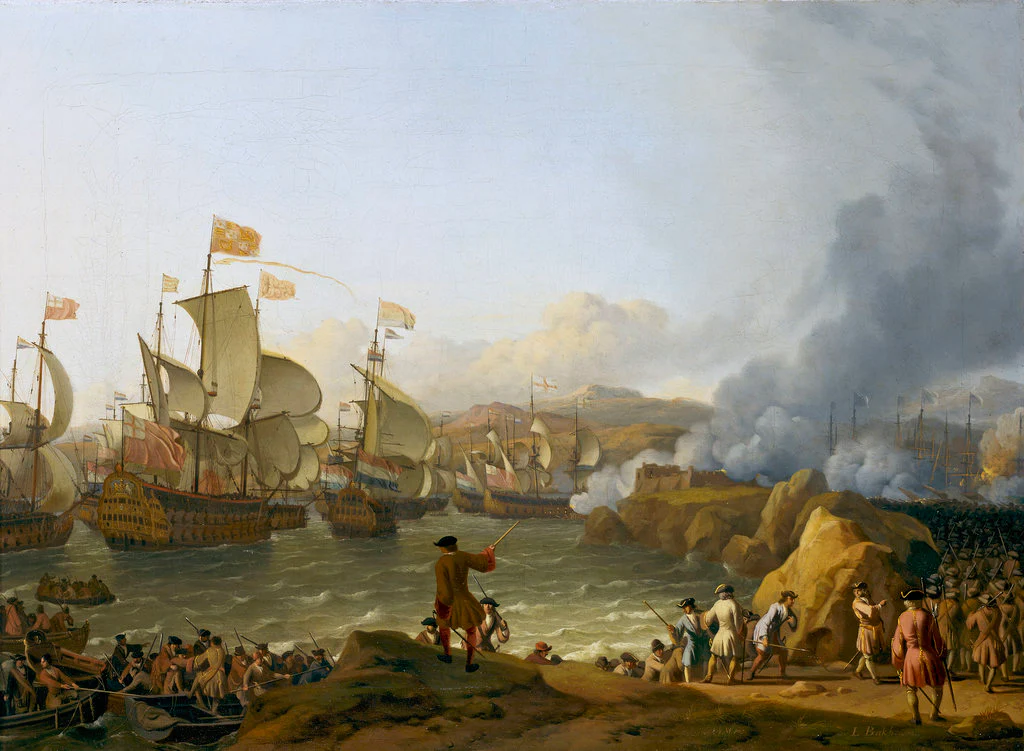
- The Battle of Vigo Bay; Ludolf Bakhuizen, c. 1702
Date	23 October 1702
Location	Ria of Vigo, Galicia, Spain 42.275°N 8.675°W
Result	Anglo-Dutch victory

Belligerents
England; Dutch Republic	France; Spain

Commanders and leaders
George Rooke; Philips van Almonde	Châteaurenault; Manuel de Velasco

Strength
25 ships of the line + frigates and fireships	15 French ships of the line 3 Spanish galleons + frigates, fireships, and transports

Casualties and losses
~800 killed	All ships burnt or captured ~2,000 killed

The Battle of Vigo Bay, also known as the Battle of Rande (Galician: Batalla de Rande; Spanish: Batalla de Rande) or sometimes as the Battle of Redondela Bay, was a naval engagement fought on 23 October 1702 during the opening years of the War of the Spanish Succession. The engagement followed an Anglo-Dutch attempt to capture the Spanish port of Cádiz in September in an effort to secure a naval base in the Iberian Peninsula. From this station the Allies had hoped to conduct operations in the western Mediterranean Sea, particularly against the French at Toulon.

The amphibious assault, however, had proved a disaster, but as Admiral George Rooke retreated home in early October, he received news that the Spanish treasure fleet from America, laden with silver and merchandise, had entered Vigo Bay in northern Spain. Philips van Almonde convinced Rooke to attack the treasure ships, despite the lateness of the year and the fact that the vessels were protected by French ships-of-the-line.

The Franco-Spanish fleet sought safety in Redondela Bay behind a boom with twin batteries. However, Allied marines captured the harbour batteries while an Allied ship broke the boom. The main Anglo-Dutch fleet then attacked the outnumbered and immobilized French fleet. The French surrendered six ships-of-the-line (five to the English and one to the Dutch), and others were destroyed.

The engagement was an overwhelming naval success for the Allies: the entire French escort fleet, under the command of François Louis Rousselet de Châteaurenault, together with the Spanish galleons and transports under Manuel de Velasco, had either been captured or destroyed. Yet because most of the treasure had been off-loaded before the attack, capturing the bulk of the silver cargo had eluded Rooke. Nevertheless, the victory was a welcome boost to Allied morale and helped persuade Peter II of Portugal to abandon his earlier treaty with France and join the Grand Alliance.

== Background ==
The accession of the Bourbon Philip V to the Spanish throne in 1700 had aroused little opposition in Spain. In the Spanish American empire, however, officials and colonists resisted French attempts to take over their trade. Dutch and English traders, though officially illegal, were accepted by the Spanish, but in the Caribbean, French admirals who had come to "protect" Spanish silver home to Europe were regarded with intense suspicion. The first French squadron sailed in April 1701 under the Marquis de Coëtlogon, but the Spanish governors would not even permit him to buy victuals, and he returned empty handed. Nevertheless, the weakness of the Spanish navy left the government in Madrid little choice but to rely on French warships for escort duty. Every effort was made to ensure that the bullion was landed in Spain rather than France, from where it might never return.

The naval campaign of 1702 was therefore played out in two distant theatres of America and Spain, linked together by the trail of the Spanish treasure ships across the Atlantic. The American theatre became a scene long remembered in popular English tradition following Admiral Benbow's running battle in August off Santa Marta. However, the Royal Navy's main effort was not off the Spanish Main, but off the Spanish coasts in Europe. Under the leadership of King William III, the Maritime Powers, England and the Dutch Republic, had resolved upon a Mediterranean strategy for the Allied fleets, a policy continued under William's successors following his death in March 1702. It was hoped that this strategy would encourage Portugal to join the Allies, open the Strait of Gibraltar, and secure English naval power in the Mediterranean. Their allies, the Austrians, were also clamouring for a naval presence in the Mediterranean to assist them in achieving their own primary ambitions, the capture of Spain's provinces in Italy. To meet these ends, the Anglo-Dutch fleets would first need to seize a port in the Iberian Peninsula from which their ships could operate. The Allies, therefore, resolved upon an expedition, led by Admiral George Rooke, to capture the southern Spanish port of Cádiz, and at a stroke cut off Spain's transatlantic trade.

== Prelude ==
=== Silver fleet from America ===
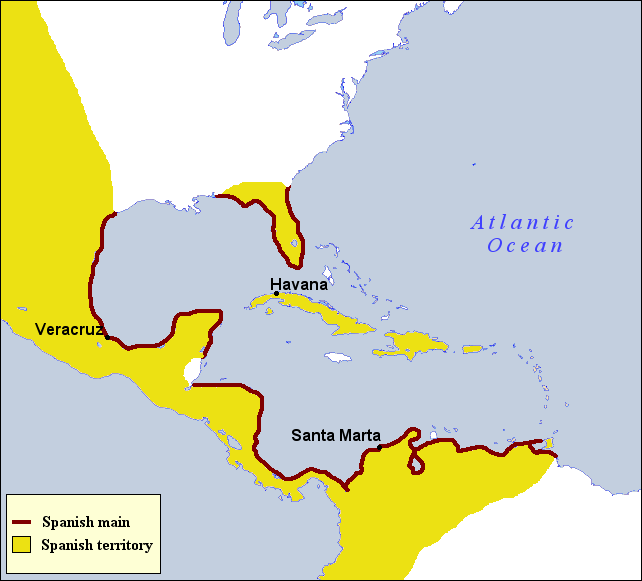
The Spanish Main.

On 11 June 1702, the Spanish silver fleet from New Spain left Veracruz under escort of a French squadron commanded by Admiral François Louis Rousselet de Châteaurenault. The Spanish vessels were commanded by Manuel de Velasco in his armed galleon, the Jesús María y José, one of three ships forming the Armada de Barlovento whose task it was to protect the fleet. The whole convoy arrived at Havana on 7 July, before striking out across the Atlantic on the 24th. The fleet comprised 56 vessels: 22 were Spanish, the rest French, including a large number of merchantmen which, by the end of the voyage, had sailed for France as soon as their safety across the Atlantic had been assured.

When Châteaurenault had set out for the Caribbean in 1701, war between France and the Maritime Powers had not yet been declared, but the convoy had since received news of the outbreak of hostilities and of Rooke's blockade of Cádiz, the usual destination of the silver fleet from America. It was clear, therefore, a new harbour would be needed. Velasco considered the small port of Los Pasajes, but Châteaurenault favoured Brest, La Rochelle or even Lisbon. A compromise was put forward, and on 23 September the Franco-Spanish fleet entered Vigo Bay in Galicia. There was, however, considerable delay in unloading the cargo. The whole administrative apparatus normally present at unloading (inspectors, valuers, royal officials, etc.), was in Seville and Cádiz, and had to be awaited before anything could be put ashore. When the unloading eventually began, it was found that means of transporting the goods were lacking. As a result, priority was given to the silver, which was unloaded first and despatched inland to Lugo.

=== Allied pursuit ===
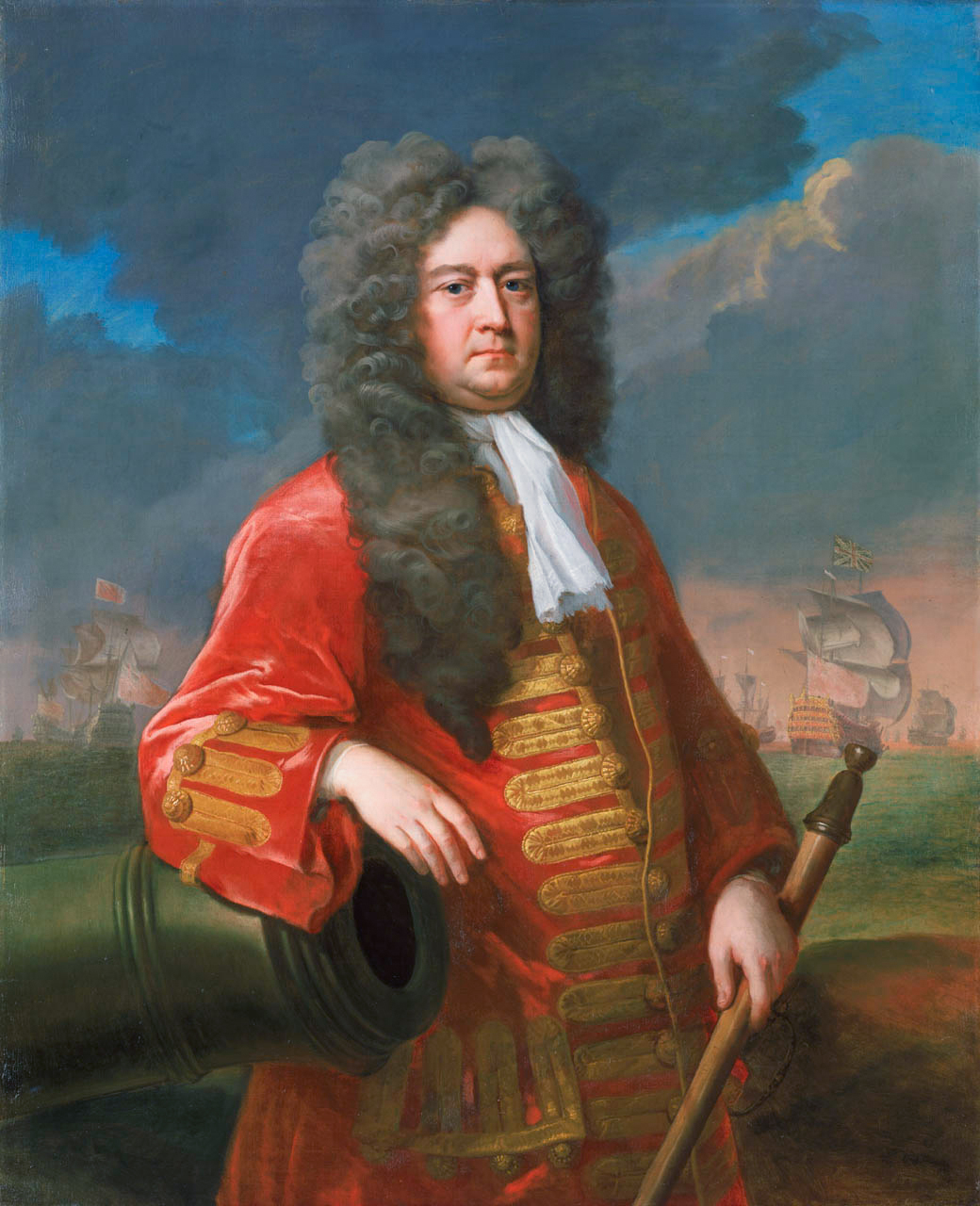
Admiral George Rooke (1650–1709) by Michael Dahl.

By mid-October the English government had learnt of the Spanish presence in Vigo Bay, and immediately sent off messengers to scour the seas for Rooke and Admiral Cloudesley Shovell, the latter of whom had been cruising with his squadron off Ushant. By now Rooke was returning home from the disastrous campaign against Cádiz, which, due to ill-discipline and poor co-operation, had forced the admiral to abandon the enterprise at the end of September. Fortuitously, however, Rooke had already learnt the news of the Spanish convoy from one of his own ships – Captain Thomas Hardy in the Pembroke who had stayed behind to water in the Portuguese port of Lagos. Pembroke's chaplain, a Jersey man named Beauvoir, had learned from the boastful French consul of the treasure ships in the harbour, news of which had been confirmed to Beauvoir by a messenger from the Imperial Embassy in Lisbon. At once, Hardy gave chase, and caught Rooke on 17 October in time to prevent him crossing the Bay of Biscay. Admiral Rooke recorded in his journal:

Under consideration of the intelligence brought to Captain Hardy of the Pembroke ... It is resolved that we make best our way to the port of Vigo, and insult them immediately with our whole line, if not by such detachments as shall render the attempt most effectual.

Rooke sent ships to explore the mouth of Vigo Bay. A landing party had gleaned information from a captured friar that King Philip's part of the treasure had already been landed, but that much wealth was still left on board the Spanish vessels.

== Battle ==
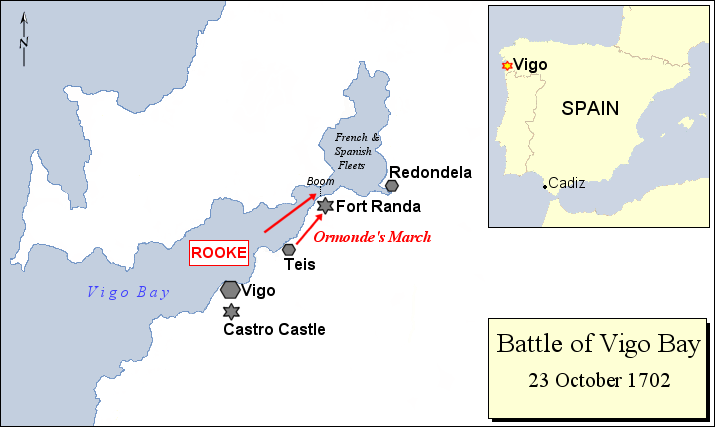
Battle of Vigo Bay 1702. The walled town of Vigo sits about halfway down the bay.

On the evening of 22 October the Anglo-Dutch fleet entered the Ria de Vigo, and sailed past the two forts of the city of Vigo that fired at them as they passed by. At the end of the bay the French fleet and Spanish treasure ships lay in the harbour of Redondela, surrounded by the Galician mountains. Châteaurenault had taken charge of the defensive measures, and had blocked the narrow entrance, across the Rande Strait, with a boom made largely of timber and chain tightly bound together. At the north end of the boom was positioned a gun battery which, according to Rooke's journal, comprised "fifteen or sixteen" guns; at the south end sat Fort Rande sitting a little way up from the sea, consisting of a strong stone tower with platforms constructed for cannon. The space between the tower and the water's edge consisted of a fortified enclosure, at the bottom of which stood a battery commanding the straits. In total, the Rande fortifications had been armed with more than 30 guns. To supplement the French troops from the fleet, a number of levies were raised by the Prince of Barbançon, governor and captain-general of Galicia.

Aboard the Royal Sovereign an Allied council of war discussed the options for the attack. The plan was to destroy the boom with English and Dutch ships, whilst the troops from the fleet would silence the shore defences. But the naval encounter would not be a conventional line-of-battle engagement: Vigo Bay allowed no room for the deployment of a battle line, so Rooke had to adapt his tactics to the exigencies of the situation. Rooke recorded in his journal:

Upon consideration of the present position of Monsieur Châteaurenault's squadron... and in regard the whole fleet cannot, without great hazard of being in a huddle, attempt them where they are: it is resolved to send in a detachment of fifteen English and ten Dutch ships of the line of battle with all the fireships, to use their best endeavours to take or destroy the aforesaid ships of the enemy ...

=== Breaking the boom ===
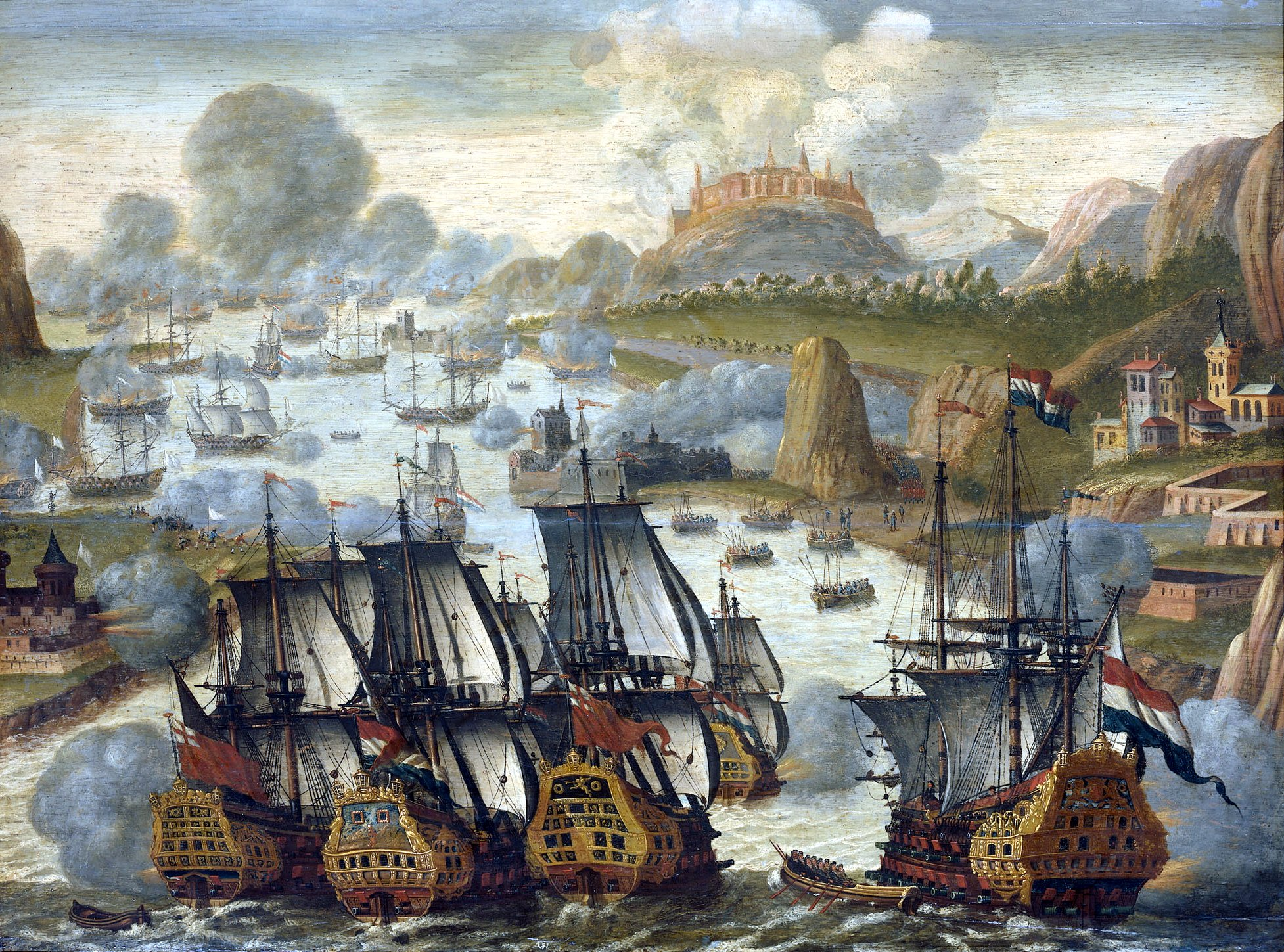
Sea Battle of Vigo bay, 23 October 1702. Episode in the War of the Spanish Succession, anonymous.

Early in the morning on 23 October, Vice Admiral Thomas Hopsonn in the Torbay led the attack on the boom, closely followed by a strong squadron of his English ships, and of Dutch vessels under Vice Admiral Philips van der Goes. Near each end of the boom Châteaurenault had moored two of his largest men-of-war: the Bourbon, and the Esperance. Within the boom he had moored five other large men-of-war with their broadsides bearing upon the entrance.

Meanwhile, Ormonde with some 2,000 men, had landed on the shore near Teis and marched on Fort Rande. Ormonde sent Lord Shannon with the vanguard of grenadiers to assault the position, defended by several hundred troops. The wall enclosing the outer ward was stormed, and the seaward battery silenced in time to assist the breaking of the boom by the ships. The tower, defended by approximately 300 Franco-Spanish troops, held out a little longer, but this also fell to the Allied grenadiers. As the southern shore guns were being assailed by Ormonde's men, the 90 gun Association attacked and silenced the smaller northern battery on the other side of the bay.

The Torbay, favoured by a breath of wind, crashed at the boom. It cracked, and the ship floated through in amongst the French squadron beyond. However, a sudden drop in the breeze prevented any other Allied vessel following, and Hopsonn found himself temporarily outnumbered. A fireship was laid alongside the Torbay, setting it alight. Fortunately for Hopsonn the fireship, laden with snuff from the Spanish Indies, suddenly blew up, and a great cloud enveloped the English vessel, partly extinguishing the flames thus enabling the crew to control the blaze. According to Rooke's journal 53 men were drowned in the incident, but as the breeze picked up the other Allied ships managed to traverse the boom and engage with the enemy.

With the boom broken, and the forts silenced, the Franco-Spanish fleet was lost. Offering little resistance, Châteaurenault's men set fire to their own ships in the harbour, and sought safety on shore. The Allied seamen worked throughout the night to save their prizes, and by morning there was not a single French or Spanish vessel that had not been either captured or destroyed.

== Aftermath ==
=== Losses and gains ===
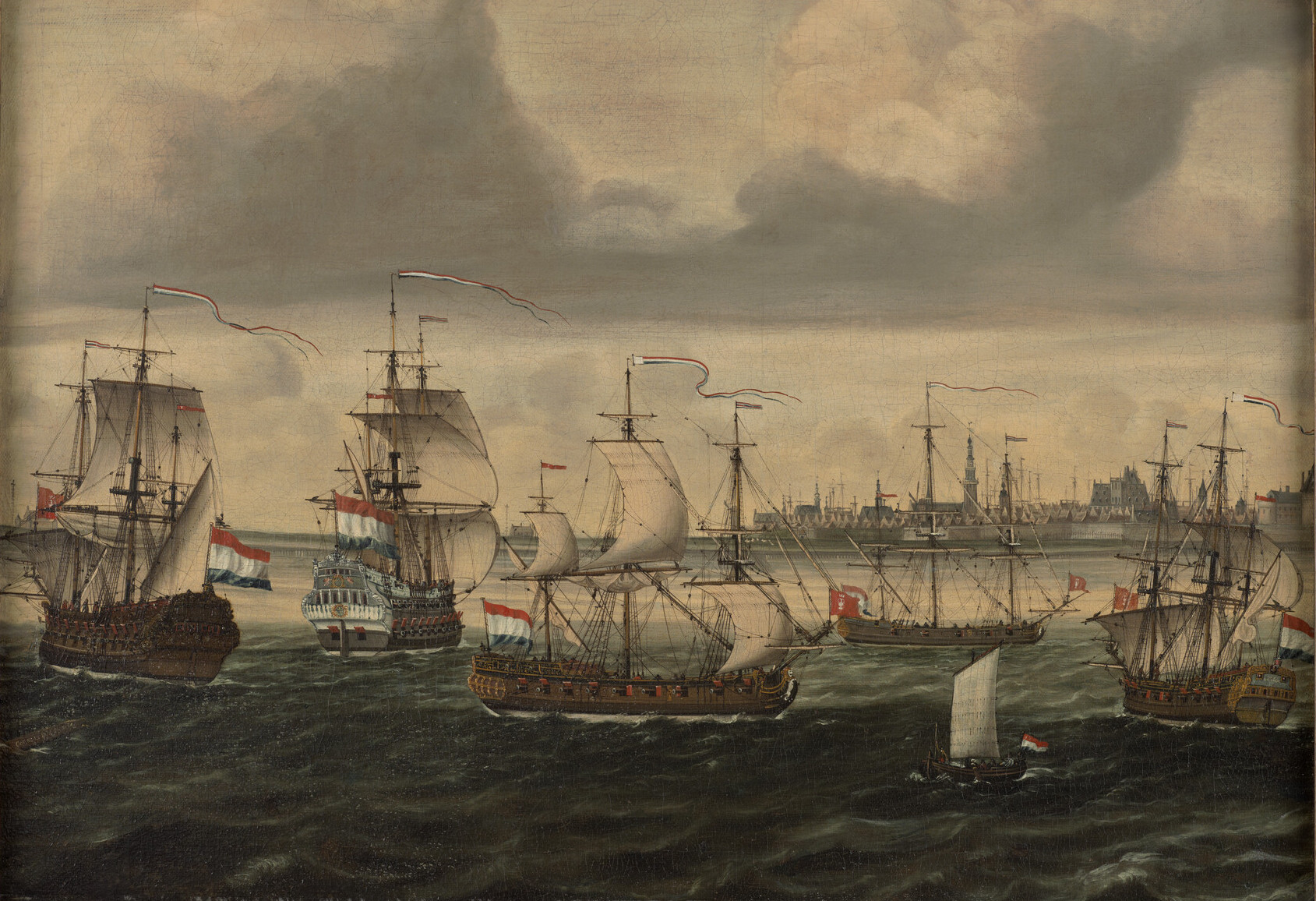
French ship of the line Bourbon being brought into the Vlissingen roadstead after the battle

Vigo Bay was a major naval disaster for the French: of the 15 ships of the line, 2 frigates and one fireship, not a single vessel escaped. Five ships were captured by the English, and one by the Dutch. The rest were burnt, either by the Allies or the French themselves. (See table below). The Spanish suffered as badly: of the three galleons and 13 trading vessels in their fleet, all were destroyed, save five which were taken by the Allies (at least three of these were captured by the English). By 24 October most of the damage was complete. What remained of the ships and the fortifications were destroyed by Admiral Shovell's squadron on 27 October.

Spanish naval losses meant a total dependence on the French navy to keep up communications with the Americas. However, the Spanish government felt no financial blow: it owned only two of the three large galleons, and none of the trading vessels. Those who suffered most, not just from the losses of the ships but also from the immense merchandise on board (pepper, cochineal, cocoa, snuff, indigo, hides, etc.) were the private traders. The news that the treasure fleet had got safely to Vigo was initially the cause of celebration for the merchants of Holland but the subsequent reports of the battle were received with mixed feelings in Amsterdam as the wealth captured or destroyed belonged as much to the English and Dutch traders as it did to the Spanish. What the Spanish government did own was the silver, most of which had already been unloaded from the ships before the Allied attack, and was ultimately deposited in the castle of Segovia.

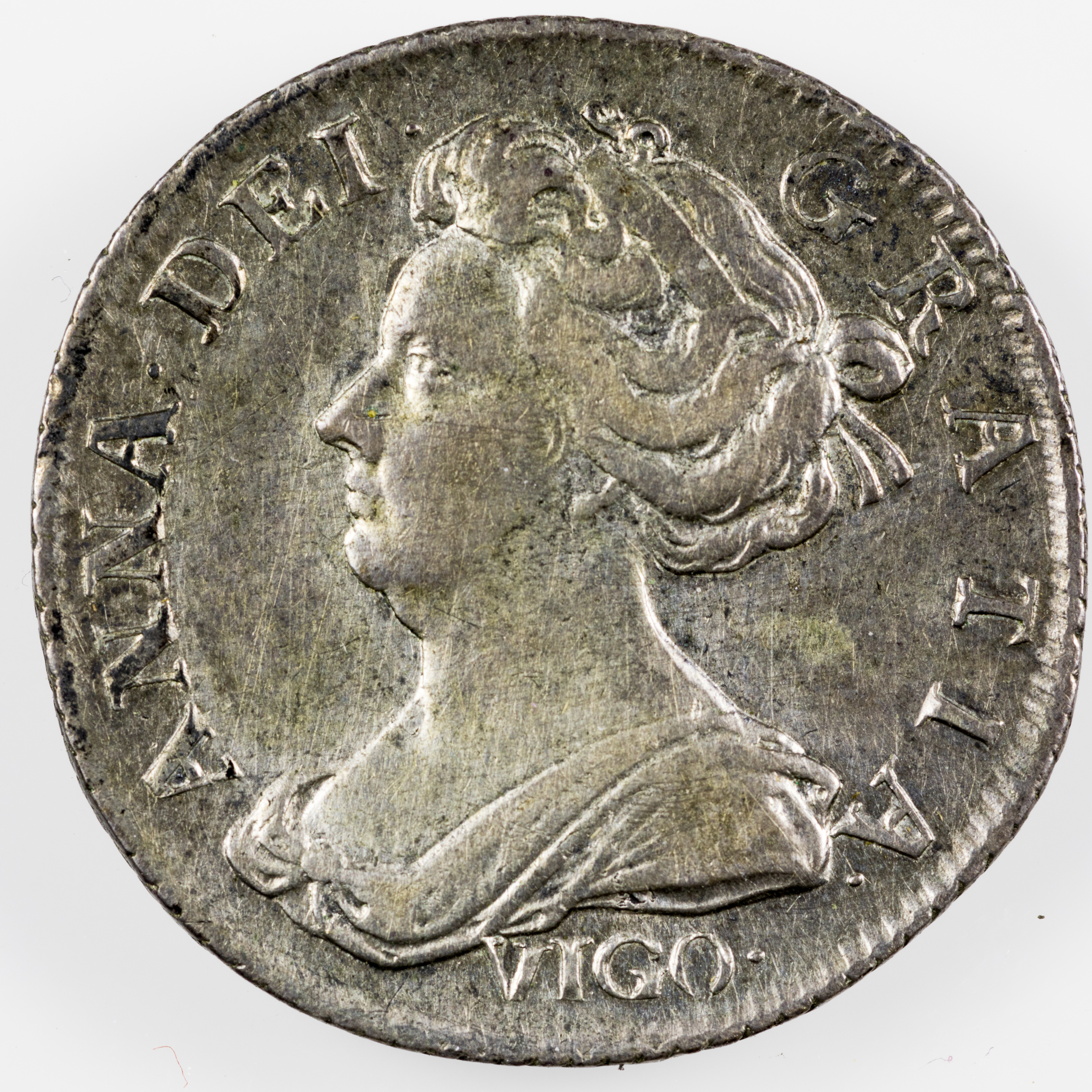
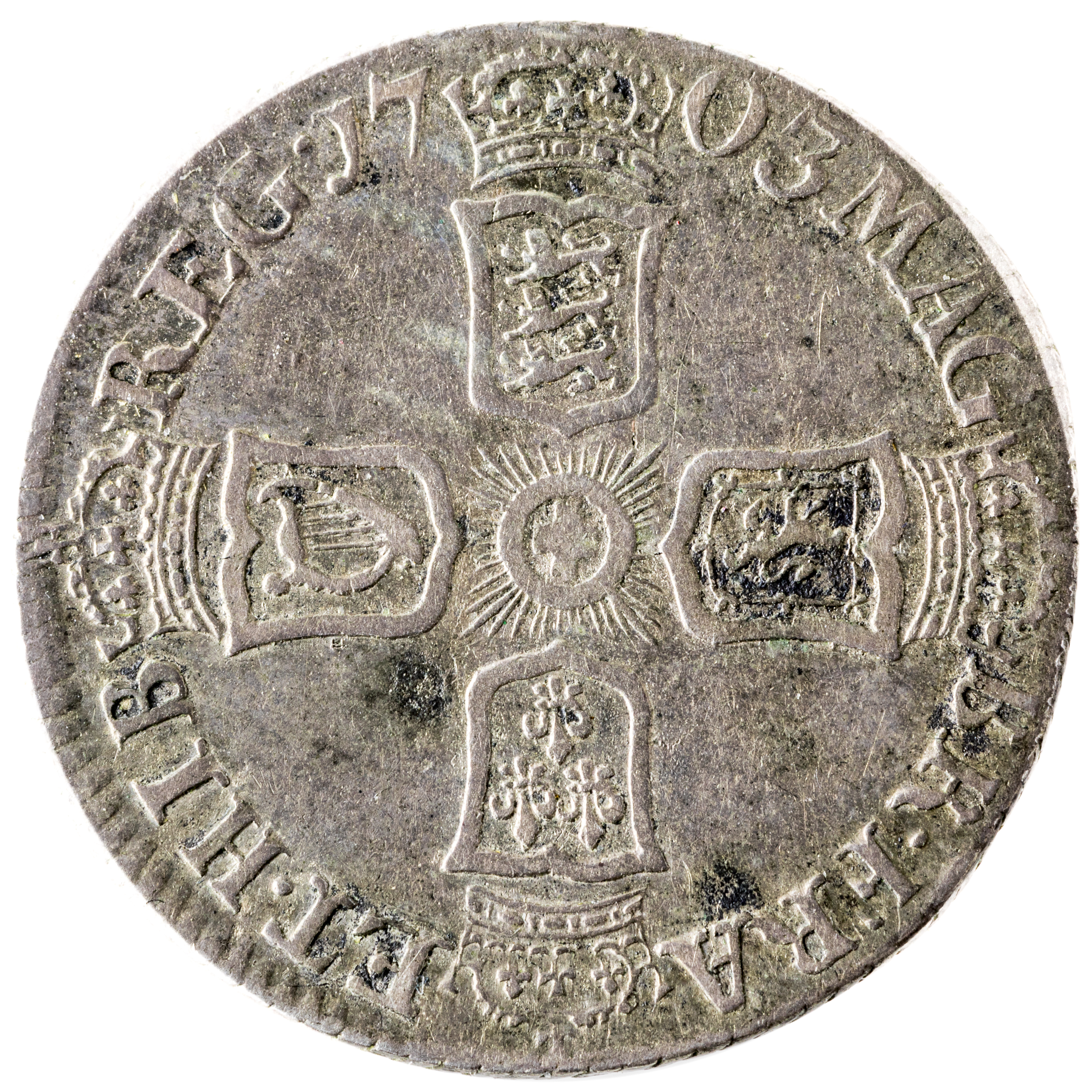
English Sixpence dated 1703 with bust of Queen Anne and inscription VIGO

The Allies, therefore, did not capture as much silver for themselves as was often supposed. The Master of the Mint, Isaac Newton, stated in June 1703 that the total metal handed in to him by that date was 4504 lb 2 oz of silver (~2,043 kg), and 7 lb 8 oz and 13 dwt of gold (~3.4 kg), estimated at a value of just £14,000. Coins subsequently struck from these metals bore the word VIGO below Anne's bust, and are rare and valuable.

In February 1703, Philip V issued a decree, by way of reprisal, to confiscate all the silver that had come with the treasure fleet belonging to the English and Dutch, totalling four million pesos. In addition, the King decided to borrow two million pesos from what had come for the Spanish traders and the Consulate of Seville. In total, Philip managed to keep nearly seven million pesos, representing over half the silver from the fleet, amounting to the biggest sum in history obtained from the American trade by any Spanish king. The result was an immense financial windfall for Philip V.

=== Methuen Treaties ===
The naval success at Vigo had considerable implications for the Grand Alliance. On the accession of the Bourbon Philip V to the Spanish throne, King Peter II of Portugal, anxious to remain friends with his more powerful neighbour, had signed an alliance with France in June 1701. But it was the security of Portugal's overseas empire that was more important than its inland frontier. To protect Portugal's trade routes from South America, the ministers in Lisbon knew the importance of aligning themselves with the dominant naval power in the Atlantic. After Rooke's success at Vigo, it was clear that that naval strength reposed in the Maritime Powers.

In May 1703, the Portuguese signed the Methuen Treaties with England. "The preservation of our overseas colonies makes it indispensable for us to have a good intelligence with the powers which now possess the command of the sea," commented José da Cunha Brochado, the Portuguese minister in London, "the cost is heavy, but for us such an understanding is essential." It was an Allied triumph to detach Portugal from her French alliance: with Lisbon as a base the Allied fleet could dominate the Strait of Gibraltar and cripple French action in the Mediterranean. But the alliance with Portugal forced a major change in Allied strategy: the Maritime Powers now found themselves committed to extensive campaigning in Spain, with one army based in Lisbon, another based to the east in Catalonia. The policy was ultimately to prove a heavy burden and the cause of a disastrous campaign in the peninsula, but in the long term, the commercial provisions of the treaties were to prove an essential component of Britain's wealth. The naval victory at Vigo, therefore, made an indirect but powerful contribution to Britain's 18th century prosperity.

=== Sunken treasure ===
Efforts to recover the sunken treasure began almost immediately and continued for centuries. After their initial attempts failed, the Spanish government hired private contractors to recover the treasure, but these also proved unsuccessful. In 1728, a Frenchman named Alexandre Goubert managed to bring a ship almost completely to shore, but abandoned his efforts when it became apparent that it was a French battleship without treasure. An English expedition in 1825 led by William Evans utilized a diving bell, and over the course of a year managed to recover small amounts of silver, cannonballs, and other items. Around the same period, a group calling itself The American Vigo Bay Treasure Company made an ill-fated attempt to raise a ship, tearing it apart. Decades later, Cavalier Pino, using his invention the hydroscope, scanned the location and mapped out several ships, and with a series of careful experiments managed to recover several cannons and preserved wood.

On 10 August 1990 after being surveyed by sonar side scan on behalf of 5º Centenario (Spanish Government 500th anniversary of America's discovery) remains of the wreckage Santo Cristo de Maracaibo were found off the Cíes Islands by R.O.V submarine at 79 metres depth. The Contractor was Hidrografic S.A., Tarragona, Surveyor and R.O.V. Pilot: Olaf Hingst, Vessel: 'Potela Seis', Vigo.

== In popular culture ==
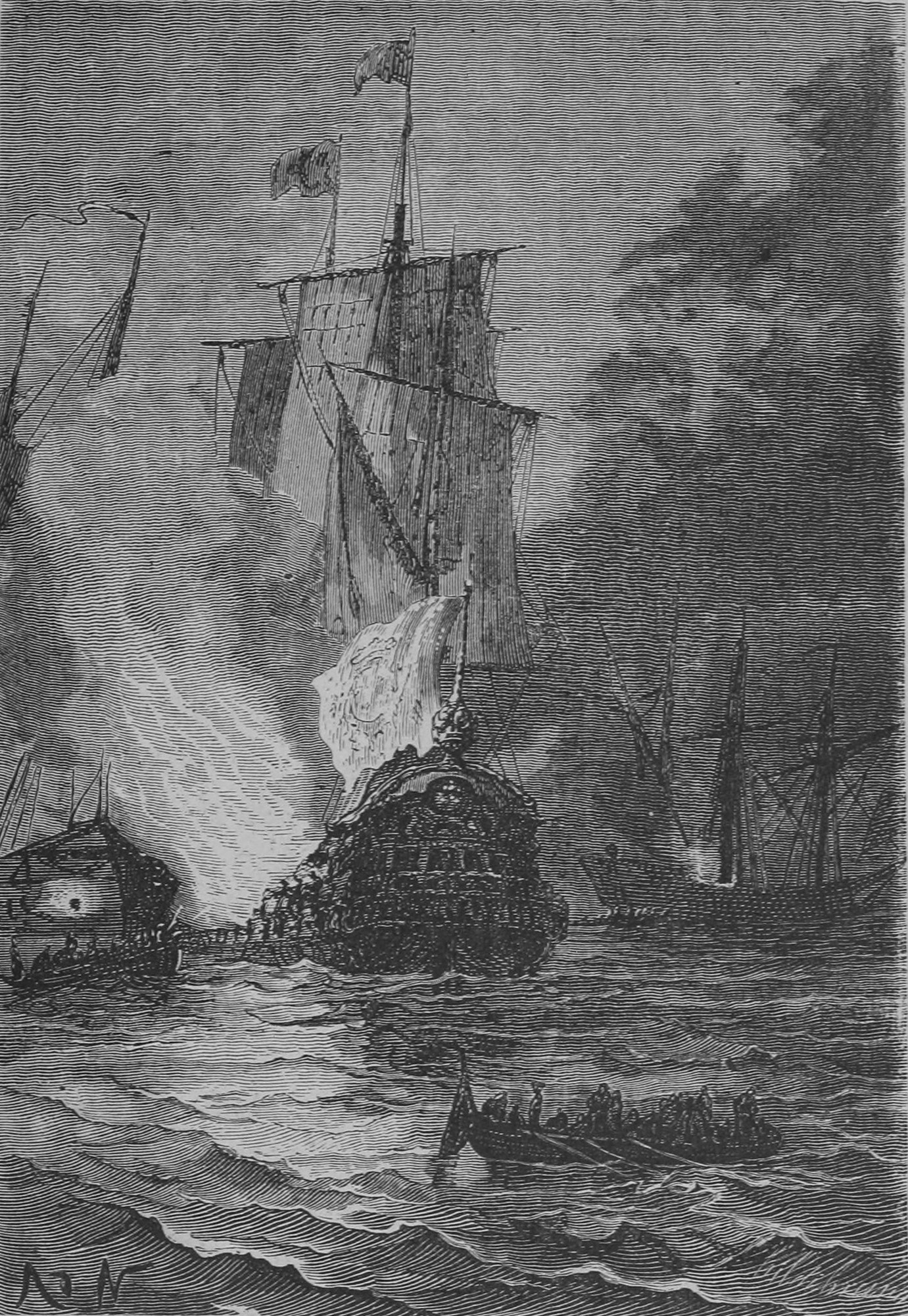
The Battle of Vigo Bay as depicted by Alphonse de Neuville in Twenty Thousand Leagues Under the Seas.

In the Netherlands, the battle, and more specific the capture of the Spanish treasure, was referred to in a popular broadside ballad Een Nieuw Lied van den Spaensche Zilvervloot ("A New Song on the Spanish Silver Fleet"), published in subsequent publications during the 18th century.

The battle is referred to in Jules Verne's 1870 novel Twenty Thousand Leagues Under the Seas. The book's protagonist, Captain Nemo, draws his wealth and the funding for his submarine Nautilus from the cargoes of the ships sunk by the Grand Alliance fleet during the battle, which are depicted as never having offloaded their treasure and as being easily accessible to divers.

== Fleets ==
Anglo-Dutch – Rooke
Ship	Guns	Commander	Notes
Mary	62	Captain Edward Hopson	Accompanied by Phoenix (fireship)
Grafton	70	Captain Thomas Harlowe	Accompanied by Vulture (fireship), Captain Thomas Long
Torbay	80	Vice-Admiral Thomas Hopsonn; Captain Andrew Leake	
Kent	70	Captain John Jennings	
Monmouth	70	Captain John Baker	
Dordrecht	72	Captain Barend van der Pott	
De Zeven Provinciën	92	Vice-Admiral Philips van der Goes; Captain Starrenburgh	Accompanied by one fireship
Veluwe	64	Captain Baron van Wassenaer	
Berwick	70	Captain Richard Edwards	Accompanied by Terrible (fireship), Captain Edward Rumsey
Essex	70	Rear-Admiral Sir Stafford Fairborne; Captain John Hubbard	Accompanied by Griffin (fireship), Captain William Scaley
Swiftsure	70	Captain Robert Wynn	
Ranelagh	80	Captain Richard Fitzpatrick	
Somerset	80	Admiral Sir George Rooke; Captain Thomas Dilkes	Accompanied by Hawk (fireship), Captain Bennett Allen
Bedford	70	Captain Henry Haughton	Accompanied by Hunter (fireship), Commander Sir Charles Rich
Slot van Muiden	72	Captain Schrijver	
Holland	72	Lieutenant-Admiral Gerard Callenburgh	Accompanied by one fireship
Unie	94	Vice-Admiral Baron J. G. van Wassenaer	
Reigersbergen	74	Captain Lijnslager	
Cambridge	70	Captain Richard Lestock	
Northumberland	70	Rear-Admiral John Graydon; Captain James Greenaway	Accompanied by Lightning (fireship), Captain Thomas Mitchell
Orford	70	Captain John Norris	
Pembroke	60	Captain Thomas Hardy	
Gouda	64	Captain François van Aerssen	
Wapen van Alkmaar	72	Vice-Admiral Anthonij Pieterson	Accompanied by one fireship
Catwijk	72	Captain Cornelis Beeckman	
Association	90	Captain William Bokenham	Attacked forts at mouth of harbour
Barfleur	90	Captain Francis Wyvill	Attacked forts at mouth of harbour

French – Châteaurenault
Ship	Guns	Commander	Notes
Fort	70	Lt-Gen le Marquis de Châteaurenault	Burnt
Prompt	76	Admiral Beaujeu	Captured by the English, became HMS Prompt
Assuré	66	d'Aligre	Captured by the English, became HMS Assurance
Espérance d'Angleterre	70	Gallissonnière	Captured, but run ashore and bilged
Bourbon	68	Montbault	Captured by the Dutch
Sirène	60	Mongon	Captured, but run ashore and bilged
Solide	50	Champmeslin	Burnt
Ferme	72	Beaussier	Captured by the English, became HMS Firm
Prudent	60	Grandpré	Burnt
Oriflamme	64	Edme-Elie Certaines de Fricambault †	Burnt
Modéré	56	L'Autier	Captured by the English, put in service as HMS Moderate
Superbe	70	Botteville	Captured, but run ashore and bilged
Dauphine	40	Duplessis	Burnt
Volontaire	46	Sorel	Captured, but run ashore and destroyed
Triton	42	Claude-Élisée de Court de La Bruyère	Captured by the English, became HMS Triton
Entreprenant	22		Burnt
Choquante	8		Burnt
Favori	14		Fireship, burnt
Jesus Maria José	70		Captured and destroyed
Bufona	54		Captured and destroyed
Capitana de Assogos	54		Captured and destroyed

== See also ==
- Francis Drake's descent on Vigo
- Capture of Vigo
