= French ship Ambitieux (1691) =

Ship of the line of the French Navy

History

France
- Name: Ambitieux
- Builder: Rochefort Dockyard
- Laid down: July 1691
- Launched: December 1691
- Commissioned: April 1692
- Fate: Burnt at La Hougue in June 1692

General characteristics
- Tonnage: 1,600
- Length: 158 French feet (Note: The French (pre-metric) foot was 6.575% longer than the equivalent English foot.)
- Beam: 44½ French feet
- Draught: 20 - 24½ French feet
- Depth of hold: 20 French feet
- Complement: 850 men (650 in peacetime), + 16 officers
- Armament: 92 guns

The Ambitieux was a First Rank three-decker ship of the line of the French Royal Navy. She was armed with 92 guns, comprising twenty-eight 36-pounder guns on the lower deck, twenty-eight 18-pounder guns on the middle deck, and twenty-six 8-pounder guns on the upper deck, with ten 6-pounder guns on the quarterdeck.

Designed and built by Honoré Malet, she was begun at Rochefort Dockyard in July 1691 and launched on December of the same year. On completion in April 1692, she joined the Ponant fleet and took part in the Battle of Barfleur on 29 May 1692. Following that action, she was destroyed by an English attack at La Hougue in June 1692. A replacement ship of the same name was promptly built at Rochefort.
