= French ship Ambitieux (1692) =

Ship of the line of the French Navy

History

France
- Name: Ambitieux
- Builder: Rochefort Dockyard
- Laid down: June 1692
- Launched: 5 December 1692
- Commissioned: May 1693
- Out of service: March 1713
- Fate: Broken up in 1713

General characteristics
- Tonnage: 1,650
- Length: 155 French feet (Note: The French (pre-metric) foot was 6.575% longer than the equivalent English foot.)
- Beam: 45 French feet 4 inches
- Draught: 24½ French feet
- Depth of hold: 20 French feet 2 inches
- Complement: 850 men (650 in peacetime), + 11 officers
- Armament: 92 (later 96) guns

Ambitieux was a First Rank three-decker ship of the line of the French Royal Navy. She was initially armed with 92 guns, comprising twenty-eight 36-pounder guns on the lower deck, twenty-eight 18-pounder guns on the middle deck, and twenty-six 8-pounder guns on the upper deck, with ten 6-pounder guns on the quarterdeck. By 1706 an additional pair of 8-pounders were added on the upper deck, and an extra pair of 6-pounders was added on the quarterdeck, raising the ship to 96 guns; she briefly received four 100-pounders to replace four 36-pounders, but the latter were restored soon after.

Designed and begun by Honoré Malet, and completed after Malet's death by Jean Guichard, she was begun at Rochefort Dockyard in June 1692 and launched on January 1693. She was a replacement for the previous ship of the same name, destroyed by an English attack at La Hougue in June 1692. She took part in the Battle of Lagos on 28 June 1693. She was sold and broken up at Brest in 1713.

== See also ==
- First-rate
- Ship of the line
- French Royal Navy
- French ship Ambitieux (1691)
- Battle of Lagos (1693)
- Battle of La Hougue
- Arsenal de Rochefort
