= Thomas Hopsonn =

Royal Navy officer and politician (1643–1717)

Vice-Admiral Sir Thomas Hopsonn
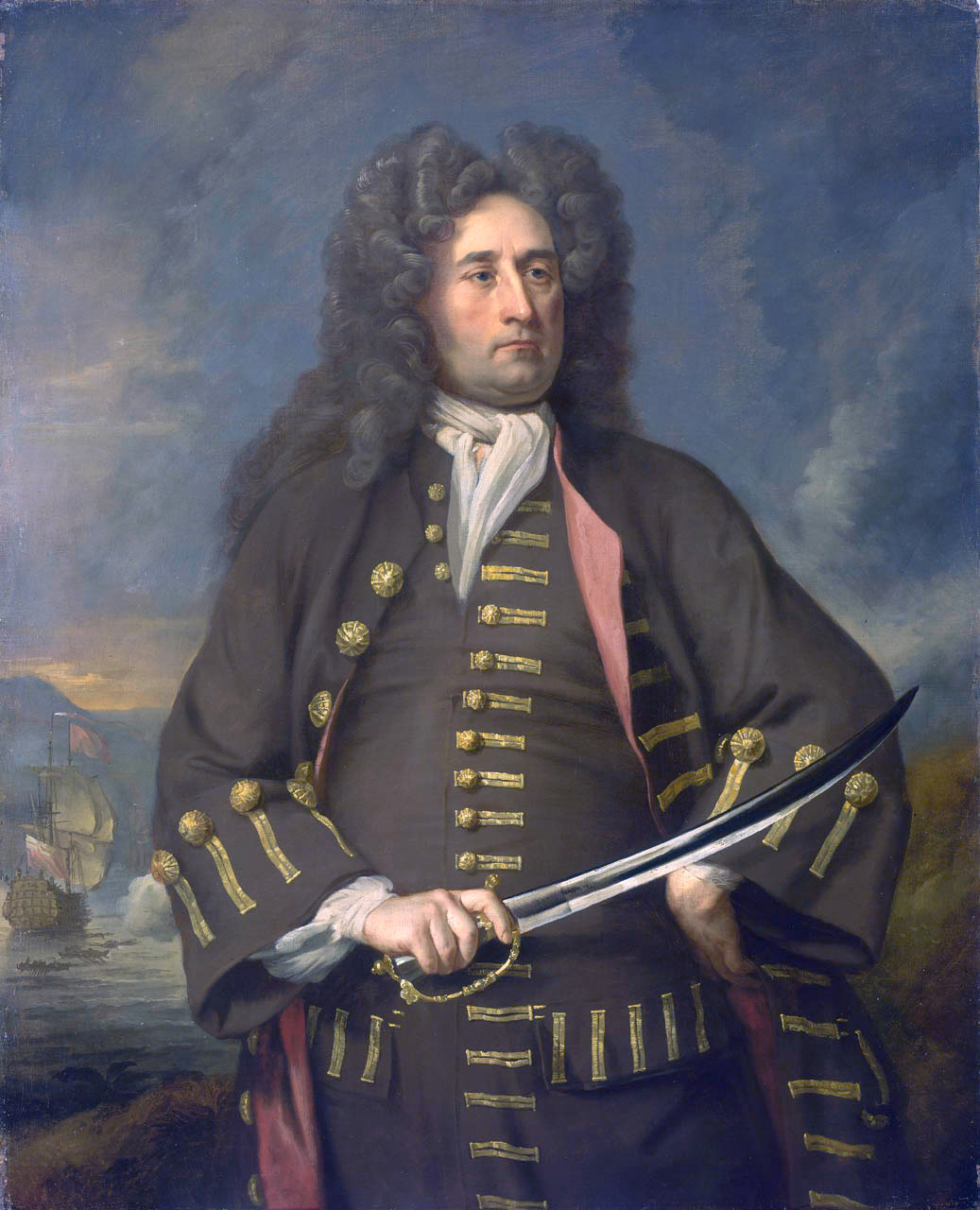
- Portrait by Michael Dahl, 1705–1708
- Born: April 1643
- Died: 12 October 1717 (aged 74); Weybridge, Surrey
- Relatives: Peregrine Hopson (son); Edward Hopson (nephew)
- Military career
- Allegiance: England
- Branch: Royal Navy
- Service years: 1662–1702
- Rank: Vice admiral
- Commands: Tiger (prize); Swann; Bonaventure; York; Royal Katherine; St Michael
- Conflicts: Third Anglo-Dutch War: Battle of Solebay; Nine Years' War: Battle of Beachy Head (1690); Battles of Barfleur and La Hogue; Battle of Lagos (1693); War of the Spanish Succession: Battle of Vigo Bay

Vice-Admiral Sir Thomas Hopsonn (April 1643 – 12 October 1717) was a Royal Navy officer and politician. His most famous action was the breaking of the boom during the battle of Vigo Bay in 1702. After retiring from active service, he became a Navy Commissioner and the governor of Greenwich Hospital.

== Early life and career ==
Hopsonn was born in Shalfleet on the Isle of Wight, where he was baptised on 6 April 1643, the second son of Captain Anthony Hopson (d. 1667) and his wife Anne Kinge. His great grandfather was the Elizabethan explorer Anthony Jenkinson. According to local tradition, he was orphaned early in life and apprenticed to a tailor in Bonchurch, near Ventnor, before running off to sea. Samuel Smiles tells the tale thus in Self Help:

He was working as a tailor's apprentice near Bonchurch, in the Isle of Wight, when the news flew through the village that a squadron of men-of-war was sailing off the island. He sprang from the shopboard, and ran down with his comrades to the beach, to gaze upon the glorious sight. The boy was suddenly inflamed with the ambition to be a sailor; and springing into a boat, he rowed off to the squadron, gained the admiral's ship, and was accepted as a volunteer.

According to John Knox Laughton in the Dictionary of National Biography, this colourful story "rests on no historical foundation".

However it happened, Hopsonn seems to have joined the navy by 1662, and was mentioned as a "particular friend" of Samuel Pepys' brother-in-law, Balthazar St Michel, in 1666. He was given his first commission, as second lieutenant of the Dreadnought, on the outbreak of the Third Anglo-Dutch War in 1672. He fought in the Battle of Solebay aboard this vessel, and in all the other battles of the war.

On 10 December 1676, he was appointed first lieutenant on the Dragon, and sailed to the Mediterranean under Sir Roger Strickland. During this time, whilst in combat aboard a Barbary Corsair, he wrenched a nimcha from the hand of one of his assailants and ran him through with it. The sword remains in the collection of the National Maritime Museum. On 5 November 1677, he followed Strickland to the Centurion, and then to the Mary on 10 December 1677. On 21 March 1678, vice admiral Herbert gave him his first command: the Tiger, which had been taken as a prize. Returning to Britain in 1679, he spent some time ashore, and had become an ensign in a foot company of the Portsmouth garrison by 1682.

== Captain ==
On 10 January 1682, he was recalled to sea and given command of the Swann. After serving initially on the coast of Ireland, his ship was part of the fleet led by George Legge to conduct the evacuation of Tangier. But, after returning home in this vessel in September 1684, he resumed his army career, becoming a Lieutenant in the 1st Foot Guards on 30 April 1685. He was finally given another naval command on 18 May 1688, when James II appointed him to the Bonaventure. This ship was part of the fleet sent to The Nore under Strickland to prevent the Dutch invasion. However, Hopsonn was one of the conspirators within the fleet who supported William of Orange in the Glorious Revolution.

Following the revolution, Hopsonn retained command of the Bonaventure and was part of the squadron that relieved the siege of Derry in June 1689. On 28 October 1689, he was posted to the York, and commanded that vessel during the battle of Beachy Head the following year. Hopsonn's immediate commander in the battle was Sir George Rooke, who formed a high opinion of his gallantry and was afterwards much associated with him. He commanded Royal Katherine for two months starting in August 1690, before moving to command the St Michael. It was aboard the latter that he followed Rooke in the battle of Barfleur on 19 May 1692. In the same year, he was promoted to become a captain in the foot guards on the recommendation of admiral Edward Russell.

== Admiral ==
In May 1693, he was made Rear Admiral of the Blue, and hoisted his flag aboard the Breda. His first mission was as second-in-command to Rooke conducting a large convoy of merchantmen to Smyrna. The convoy was attacked and scattered by the French admiral Comte de Tourville at the Battle of Lagos, but no blame was attached to Hopsonn in the subsequent inquiry.

He was promoted to Vice Admiral of the Blue and sailed for the Mediterranean under Sir Francis Wheler with the Russell as his flagship. In February 1694 he sailed home, conducting a convoy of nearly a hundred ships from Cádiz to England without incident. He spent the next two years in the Channel and off Dunkirk, attempting to trap the French privateer Jean Bart. In 1696 he gave up his commission in the Foot Guards, and in 1698 he was elected, thanks to the influence of Lord Cutts, to the rotten borough of Newtown on the Isle of Wight. He would represent the constituency until 1705.

He spent 1699 off the coasts of Ireland and France, with his flag aboard the Kent, in 1700 he went to the Baltic with Rooke to encourage Denmark to withdraw from the Great Northern War. The following summer, his squadron transported troops from Ireland to the Netherlands.

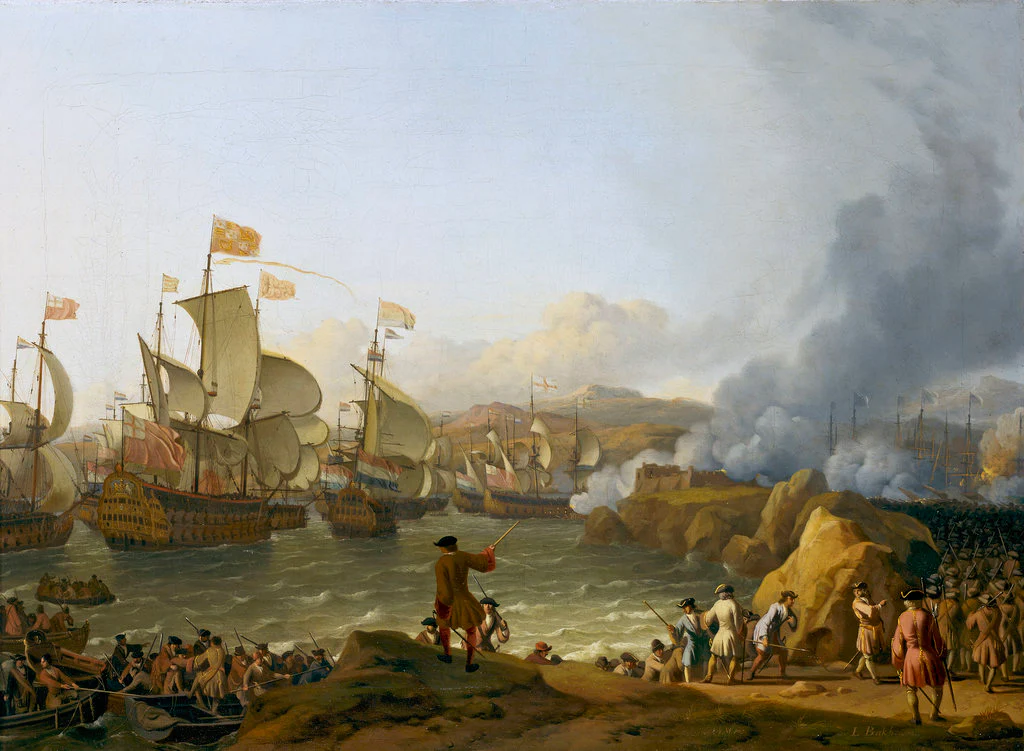
Painting of the Battle of Vigo Bay by Ludolf Bakhuizen

In 1702, Hopsonn was once more under the command of Sir George Rooke, as part of the fleet detailed to capture Cádiz. After a month of operations the attack came to nothing, but on the way home Rooke learned of the Spanish treasure fleet lying in Vigo Bay in Northern Spain. The ships were protected by a boom formed of ship's masts chained together overlooked by forts, together with French warships commanded by the Marquis de Châteaurenault. Hopsonn was chosen to lead the attack aboard his flagship the Torbay. In the early hours of 23 October 1702, Hopsonn crashed through the boom whilst under a heavy fire. A merchantman hastily repurposed as a fire ship was laid alongside Torbay, but she had not been unloaded of her cargo of snuff, which was thrown into the air when the ship exploded and partly extinguished the flames. The remainder of the fleet followed Hopsonn into the harbour and the Franco-Spanish fleet were heavily defeated. The French and Spanish lost 34 ships, and much silver and other cargo."

On returning to England, Hopsonn was knighted by Queen Anne for his actions at Vigo Bay and retired from active service. He was made an Extra Commissioner of the Navy and served as governor of Greenwich Hospital from 1704 to 1708.

He retired to Weybridge in Surrey, where he built a house called Vigo House (demolished in 1928 to make way for a hospital). Hopson died there on 12 October 1717.

== Marriage and family ==
Hopsonn married Elizabeth Timbrell (1660–1740), the daughter of John Timbrell and Ann Benett of Portsmouth, on 1 June 1680 at Brading on the Isle of Wight. The couple had eight children:

- Mary (1682–1715)
- Elizabeth (1686–1758)
- Charles (born 1688)
- Ann (1692–1763)
- Grace (1693–1768)
- Peregrine Thomas (1696–1759)
- James (born 1700)
- Martha (born 1702)

His nephew, erroneously supposed by some sources to have been his younger brother, Edward Hopson (1671–1728) also went into the navy and rose to the rank of vice-admiral of the white.

Parliament of England
Preceded by Thomas Done; Sir James Worsley	Member of Parliament for Newtown; 1698–1705; With: Sir James Worsley 1698–1701; Joseph Dudley 1701–1702; John Leigh 1702–1705	Succeeded by Sir James Worsley; Henry Worsley
Military offices
New post	Governor, Greenwich Hospital; 1704–1708	Succeeded by William Gifford
