= Sea salt aerosol =

Natural aerosol deriving from sea spray

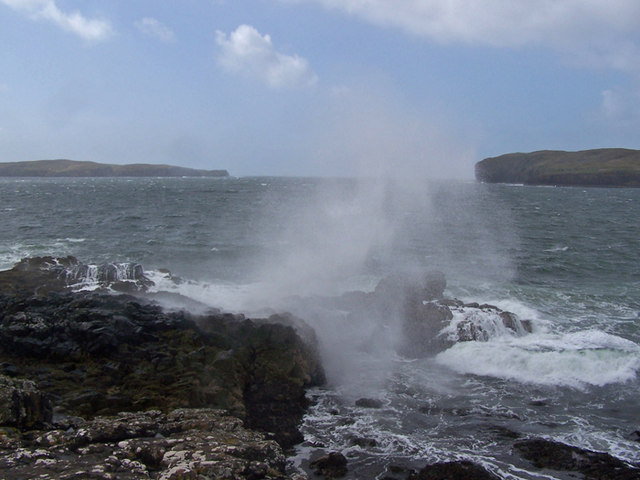
Sea salt aerosols are generated by sea spray.

Sea salt aerosol, which originally comes from sea spray, is one of the most widely distributed natural aerosols. Sea salt aerosols are characterized as non-light-absorbing, highly hygroscopic, and having coarse particle size. Some sea salt dominated aerosols could have a single scattering albedo as large as ~0.97. Due to the hygroscopy, a sea salt particle can serve as a very efficient cloud condensation nuclei (CCN), altering cloud reflectivity lifetime, and precipitation process. According to the IPCC report, the total sea salt flux from ocean to atmosphere is ~3.3 trillion kilograms per year.

== Formation ==
Many physical processes over ocean surface can generate sea salt aerosols. One common cause is the bursting of air bubbles, which are entrained by the wind stress during the whitecap formation. Another is tearing of drops from wave tops. Wind speed is the key factor to determine the production rate in both mechanisms. Sea salt particle number concentration can reach 50 cm^{−3} or more with high winds (>10 m s^{−1}), compared to ~10 cm^{−3} or less under moderate wind regimes. Due to the dependence on wind speed, it could be expected that sea-salt particle production and its impacts on climate may vary with climate change.

== Characteristics ==
=== Chemical compounds ===
Sea salt aerosols are mainly constituted of sodium chloride (NaCl), but other chemical ions which are common in sea water, such as K^{+}, Mg^{2+}, Ca^{2+}, SO_{4}^{2−} and so on, can also be found. A recent study revealed that sea salt aerosols also contain a substantial amount of organic matter. Mostly, organic materials are internally mixed due to the drying of air bubbles at the organic-rich sea surface. The fraction of organic components increases with the decreasing particle size. The contained organic materials change the optical properties of sea salt as well as the hygroscopicity, especially when some insoluble organic matter is induced.

=== Sizes ===
Size of sea salt aerosols ranges widely from ~0.05 to 10 μm in diameter, with most of masses concentrated in super-micron range (coarse mode), and highest number concentration in sub-micron range. Correspondingly, sea salt aerosols have a wide range of atmospheric lifetimes. As the sea salt aerosols are hygroscopic, their particle sizes may vary with humidity by up to a factor of 2. Sea salt aerosols influence the sulfate aerosol formation in different ways due to the different sizes. Very small sea salt aerosols, which are below the critical diameter for droplet activation at low supersaturations, can serve as nuclei for the growth of sulfate particles, while larger sea salt particles serve as a sink for gaseous hydrogen sulfate (H_{2}SO_{4}) molecules, reducing the amount of sulfate available for the formation of accumulation mode particles.

== Impacts ==
=== Altering Earth radiation budget ===
Sea salt aerosols can alter the Earth radiation budget through directly scattering solar radiation (direct effect), and indirectly changing the cloud albedo by serving as CCN (indirect effect). Different models give different predictions of annual mean radiative forcing induced by sea salt direct effect, but most of the previous studies give a number around 0.6-1.0 W m^{−2}. Radiative forcing caused by indirect effects show even greater variations in model prediction because of the parameterization of aerosol indirect effect. However, model results present a stronger indirect effect on the Southern Hemisphere. The aerosols might be used for marine cloud brightening.

=== Influencing precipitation process ===
Like all other soluble aerosols, increasing normal-sized sea salts suppresses the precipitation process in warm clouds by increasing cloud droplet number concentration and reducing the cloud droplet size. Also, they invigorate precipitation in mix-phase clouds because once the suppressed smaller cloud droplets are lifted above freezing level, more latent heat content would be released due to the freezing of cloud drops. Besides that, adding giant sea salt aerosols to polluted clouds can accelerate the precipitation process because giant CCNs could be nucleated into large particles which collect other smaller cloud drops and grow into rain droplets. Cloud drops formed on giant sea salt aerosols may grow much more rapidly by condensation that cloud drops formed on small soluble aerosol particles, as giant sea salt cloud drops may remain concentrated solution drops for long times after they are carried into cloud. Such drops may have condensational growth rates more than two times faster than drops formed on small aerosol particles, and unlike normal cloud drops, drops formed on the largest of the giant sea salt aerosols may even grow by condensation in otherwise subsaturated cloudy downdrafts.
