= André, marquis de Nesmond =

André, marquis de Nesmond (Bordeaux, 17 November 1641 – Havana, 11 June 1702) was a French naval commander from the seventeenth century.

He was the second son of Henri de Nesmond (1600–1651). Henri de Nesmond (1655–1672) was his younger brother. In 1658 he became a member of the Order of Malta. In 1662 he entered in the service of the French Navy and was wounded in 1663 in a battle with 3 Algerian corsairs. in 1667 he was promoted to captain and fought under François, Duke of Beaufort in the Siege of Candia in 1669.

In the Franco-Dutch War he commanded the Vaillant in the Battle of Solebay in 1672, the Conquérant in the Battle of Schooneveld in 1673 and again the Vaillant in the Battle of Texel.

In 1674–1675 he commanded the Actif and defeated Engel de Ruyter near The Lizard. In 1677–1678 he commanded the Belliqueux in the Caribbean, where he was implicated in the foundering of the fleet of Jean II d'Estrées, in the disaster of the Las Aves Archipelago.

During the War of the Grand Alliance, on the Content he escorted French troop ships to Ireland in 1690. He fought in the Battle of Beachy Head (1690) as captain of the Souverain.
During the Battle of Barfleur on board the Monarque, he commanded a division, and held off the Dutch vanguard until the end of the battle. In the lost Battle of La Hogue, he saved part of his division and passed with the remaining 2 ships Monarque and Aimable, through the Straits of Dover and led them north-about round Britain.

The Marquis of Nesmond then gained a reputation as a formidable raider, capturing many ships and their valuable cargos. In the Battle of Lagos (1693) he captured two Dutch warships and several merchant ships from the Smyrna Convoy.

In 1695 he captured the English warship Espérance (72) and later that year, two merchant ships from the East India Company. In 1696 he captured his greatest prize: two English merchant ships coming from India, with a cargo that was sold for 3,150,000 pounds. Later that year he also captured a merchant fleet of 9 ships from Ostende. In 1697 he operated in North America.

At the beginning of the War of Spanish Succession he was sent to the Caribbean to protect the Spanish treasure fleet but in June 1702 he got sick and died on board the Ferme in the harbor of Havana, Cuba.

== Sources ==
Bordeaux et la marine de guerre: XVIIe-XXe siècles, by Silvia Marzagalli
