= Thomas Hopson =

Thomas Hopson may refer to:

- Peregrine Hopson (1685-1759), British army officer, Governor of Nova Scotia.
- Sir Thomas Hopsonn (1642-1717), British naval officer.
