= French ship Prompt (1692) =

Ship of the line of the French Navy

History

France
- Name: Prompt
- Ordered: June 1692
- Builder: Dunkirk
- Laid down: September 1692
- Launched: 25 December 1692
- Commissioned: March 1693
- Fate: Captured at the Battle of Vigo in October 1702

General characteristics
- Tonnage: 1,200
- Length: 154 French feet (Note: The French (pre-metric) foot was 6.575% longer than the equivalent English foot.)
- Beam: 40 French feet
- Draught: 22-24½ French feet
- Depth of hold: 15 French feet 8 inches
- Complement: 500 men (380 in peacetime), + 10 officers
- Armament: 70, later 76 guns

Prompt was a second rank two-decker ship of the line of the French Royal Navy. She was armed with 70 guns, comprising twenty-eight 24-pounder guns on the lower deck and thirty 12-pounder guns on the upper deck, with twelve 6-pounder guns on the quarterdeck and the forecastle.

Designed and built by René Levasseur, she was begun at Dunkirk in September 1692 as one of the replacements for the ships destroyed by an English attack at La Hougue in June 1692. She was launched on 25 December 1692 and completed in March 1693.

Prompt took part in the Battle of Lagos on 28 June 1693. In 1698 she was substantially rebuilt at Brest Arsenal and emerged shorter by 9 feet, but now armed with 76 guns, comprising twelve 36-pounder and fourteen 24-pounder guns on the lower deck and twenty-eight 12-pounder guns on the upper deck, with twelve 6-pounder guns on the quarterdeck and six more on the forecastle, as well as four smaller 4-pounder guns on the poop.

She was captured by Edward Hopsonn's squadron during the attack on Vigo on 22 October 1702 and added to the English Navy as HMS Prompt Prize. She saw little service under her new ownership, being condemned on 20 May 1703 and taken to pieces at Chatham during the following month.
