= Henri de Nesmond =

French churchman

Henri de Nesmond (27 January 1655, Bordeaux – 27 May 1727, Toulouse) was a French churchman, bishop of Montauban, archbishop of Albi and archbishop of Toulouse.

== Biography ==
Nesmond was a son of Henri de Nesmond (1600–1651). André, marquis de Nesmond was his elder brother. He was in turn abbot of Chézy in 1682, bishop of Montauban in 1687, councillor to the parlement de Toulouse in 1695, archbishop of Albi in 1703, and finally archbishop of Toulouse in 1719. He was elected a member of the Académie Française in 1710 and mainteneur of the Académie des Jeux floraux in 1721.

"According to d'Alembert, "his revenue was really that of the poor; he divided it with them, abandoning it to them" [...] His speeches and his sermons shone with little literary qualities; they were generally written negligently; they nevertheless did not lack a certain simplicity and a certain noble grace particular to men of fashion who had a pique for fine letters."

== Works ==
- Discours et sermons (1734)
- Œuvres de Monsieur de Nesmond, archevêque de Toulouse, de l'Académie française (1754)
