= French ship Assuré (1697) =

60-gun third rate of the French Navy

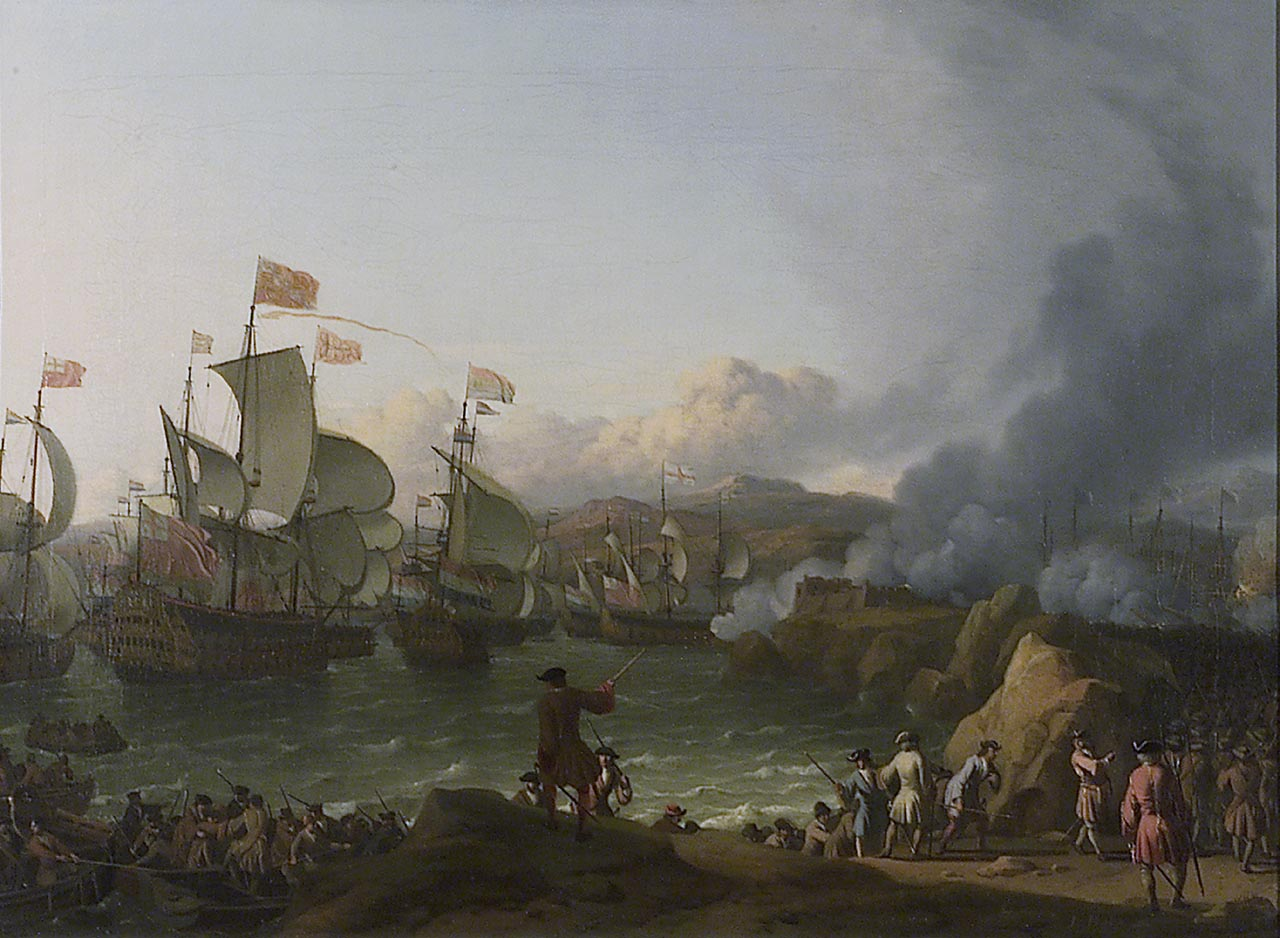
The Battle of Vigo Bay, where Assuré was captured by the combined Anglo-Dutch navy

Assuré was a 60-gun third-rate of the French Navy, launched in 1697. She was first commissioned in 1697. She was purpose-built by the Toulon-Provence yard, and was ship-rigged. After being captured at the Battle of Vigo Bay while under the command of Captain d'Aligre, she was commissioned in the Royal Navy as HMS Assurance. She was broken up in April 1712.
