= Manuel de Velasco y Tejada =

Manuel de Velasco y Tejada was a Spanish Navy officer and colonial administrator commanded the Spanish fleet during the Battle of Vigo Bay in 1702 during the War of Spanish Succession. In 1708 he bought the title of Governor of the Río de la Plata for 3,000 pesos but was apprehended there and sent to Spain, with all his belongings taken.
