= French ship Fort (1693) =

Ship of the line of the French Navy

History

France
- Name: Fort
- Ordered: June 1692
- Builder: Rochefort
- Laid down: July 1692
- Launched: February 1693
- Commissioned: May 1693
- Fate: Burnt at Battle of Vigo in October 1702 to avoid capture

General characteristics
- Tonnage: 1,200
- Length: 142 French feet (Note: The French (pre-metric) foot was 6.575% longer than the equivalent English foot.)
- Beam: 41 French feet
- Draught: 20½-24½ French feet
- Depth of hold: 17¾ French feet
- Complement: 450 men (350 in peacetime), + 8 officers
- Armament: 68 guns

Fort was a second rank two-decker ship of the line of the French Royal Navy. She was armed with 68 guns, comprising twenty-six 24-pounder guns on the lower deck and twenty-eight 12-pounder guns on the upper deck, with eight 6-pounder guns on the quarterdeck (two more were added from 1699) and six 6-pounder guns on the forecastle.

Designed and built by Pierre Masson, she was begun at Rochefort in July 1692 as one of the replacements for the ships destroyed by an English attack at La Hougue in June 1692. She was launched in February 1693 and completed in May 1693.

Fort took part in the Battle of Lagos on 28 June 1693 and was burnt to avoid capture by the English and Dutch squadron during the attack on Vigo on 22 October 1702.
