= Thomas Harlowe =

British Royal Navy captain

Captain Thomas Harlowe
- Died: 1741
- Occupation: Royal Navy captain

Thomas Harlowe (died 1741) was a British Royal Navy captain.

== Biography ==
Harlowe was on 19 March 1689–90 appointed to command the Smyrna Merchant, hired ship, and took post from that date. In the following year he commanded the Burford of 70 guns, in the grand fleet under Admiral Russell; and again in 1692, when he took part in the battle of Barfleur, being then in the division of Sir Ralph Delavall, vice-admiral of the red. In the Burford, in the Humber, and afterwards in the Torbay of 80 guns, he continued serving with the grand fleet during the war; and on 14 August 1697, while in command of a small squadron cruising in the Soundings, he fell in with and engaged a somewhat superior French squadron, under the command of M. de Pointis, homeward bound from the West Indies and laden with the spoils of Cartagena. The French were to windward, and after a three hours' contest, finding they gained no advantage, and probably unwilling to risk their very rich cargo, they hauled their wind and made sail. The English followed as they best could, but, being to leeward, were not able to prevent the enemy's retreat. After his return to England Harlowe was charged with having, by his misconduct of the action, permitted the French to escape. He was accordingly tried by court-martial on 29 November, and, after a very full investigation, was pronounced to be 'not guilty of the charge laid against him,' and was therefore acquitted. The court-martial is noticeable both for the dignity and the number of its members, Sir George Rooke, the admiral of the fleet, being president, and Shovell, Aylmer, Mitchell, and Benbow among its members, who numbered in all no less than sixty-one. It is noticeable also as being in the main an inquiry into tactical principles, the charge virtually amounting to an assertion that Harlowe might and should have cut through the enemy's line and so forced the fighting. He had not attempted to cut through it, and he was held to have done rightly by all the senior officers of the navy. Still more is it noticeable for the furious passions which raged over it, arising probably from anger that the rich prize should have escaped; even the finding of the court-martial did not still these; and for many months Harlowe would seem to have been subjected to a series of virulent attacks. Charnock is, however, wrong in saying that he had no further employment during the reign of King William. He was appointed to the Grafton on 14 February 1700–1. In 1702, still in the Grafton, he took part in the expedition to Cadiz, and was prominently engaged at Vigo in support of Vice-admiral Hopsonn. He returned to England with Sir Clowdisley Shovell [q. v.] in November, and the following April was appointed master-attendant at Deptford dockyard. In February 1704-5 he was appointed a commissioner of victualling, and continued in that office till November 1711. In May 1712 he was again appointed master-attendant of Deptford dockyard. The date of his retirement is unknown. He died 'at a very advanced age' in 1741, having been for several years the senior captain on the list.
