= Ralph Delaval =

Royal Navy officer

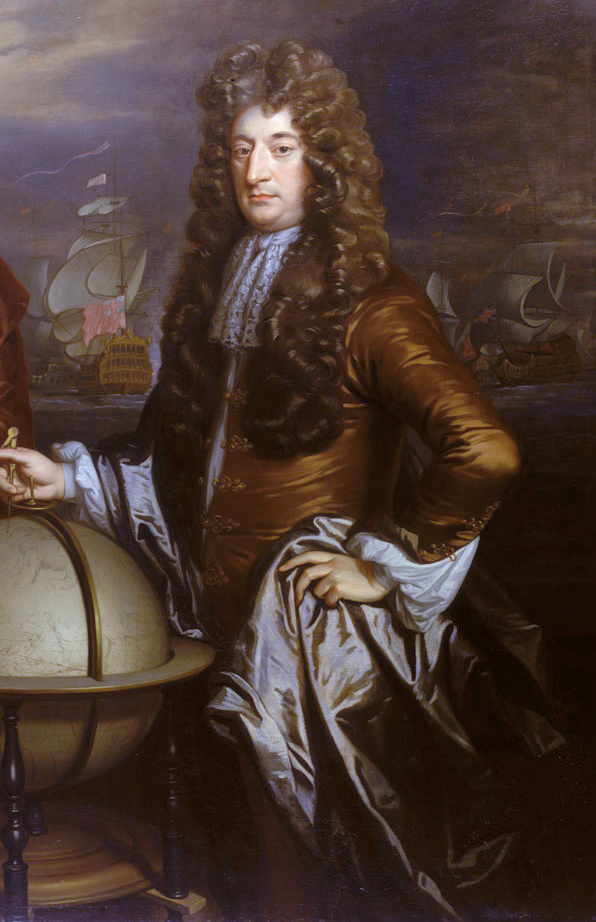
c. 1692 portrait of Delaval

Admiral Sir Ralph Delaval (c. 1641 – c. 1707) was a Royal Navy officer. He was a member of a junior branch of the Delaval family of Seaton Delaval, Northumberland. Delaval was born at Dissington Hall, Ponteland, an estate he ultimately inherited and sold to Edward Collingwood of Byker in 1673. He enlisted in the navy at a young age and progressed under the patronage of the Duke of York to become captain of the third-rate ship of the line HMS York.

He was knighted and raised to Vice-Admiral of the Blue on the accession of William III of England and led the Blue Squadron in the rear division in the Battle of Beachy Head against the French Navy on 10 July 1690. Delaval was promoted to Vice-admiral of the Red in 1692. At the battles of Barfleur and La Hogue on 9 May 1692, he personally commanded HMS Royal Sovereign and was responsible for the destruction of the French flagship Soleil Royal and two others at Cherbourg. His Royal Sovereign log books, written from 1691 to 1693, are preserved in the archives of the New York Public Library.

In 1693, Delaval, along with Henry Killigrew and Cloudesley Shovell replaced Edward Russell, 1st Earl of Orford as commander-in-chief. However, in the summer the French isolated and inflicted severe damage on the Smyrna convoy near Lagos, Portugal, for which Delaval, Killigrew and Shovell were severely criticised. A censure motion was laid in the English House of Commons alleging 'notorious and treacherous mismanagement'. William was forced to dismiss his naval advisor, the Earl of Nottingham, and appointed Russell as the new commander-in-chief. Shortly thereafter, Delaval was involved in intrigue at the royal court where he was regarded as a possible Jacobite sympathiser and he lost his command. He retired to Northumberland, and died in 1707. Delaval is buried in Westminster Abbey.
