= French cruiser Châteaurenault =

Châteaurenault has been the name of a number of ships of the French Navy, in honour of François Louis de Rousselet, Marquis de Châteaurenault:

- French cruiser Châteaurenault (1868) - second-class cruiser, present at Battle of Fuzhou (1884)
- French cruiser Châteaurenault (1898), a protected cruiser
- French cruiser Châteaurenault (D 606), the rebuilt Italian cruiser Attilio Regolo, a Capitani Romani-class cruiser.
