= French ship Bourbon (1692) =

Ship of the line of the French Navy

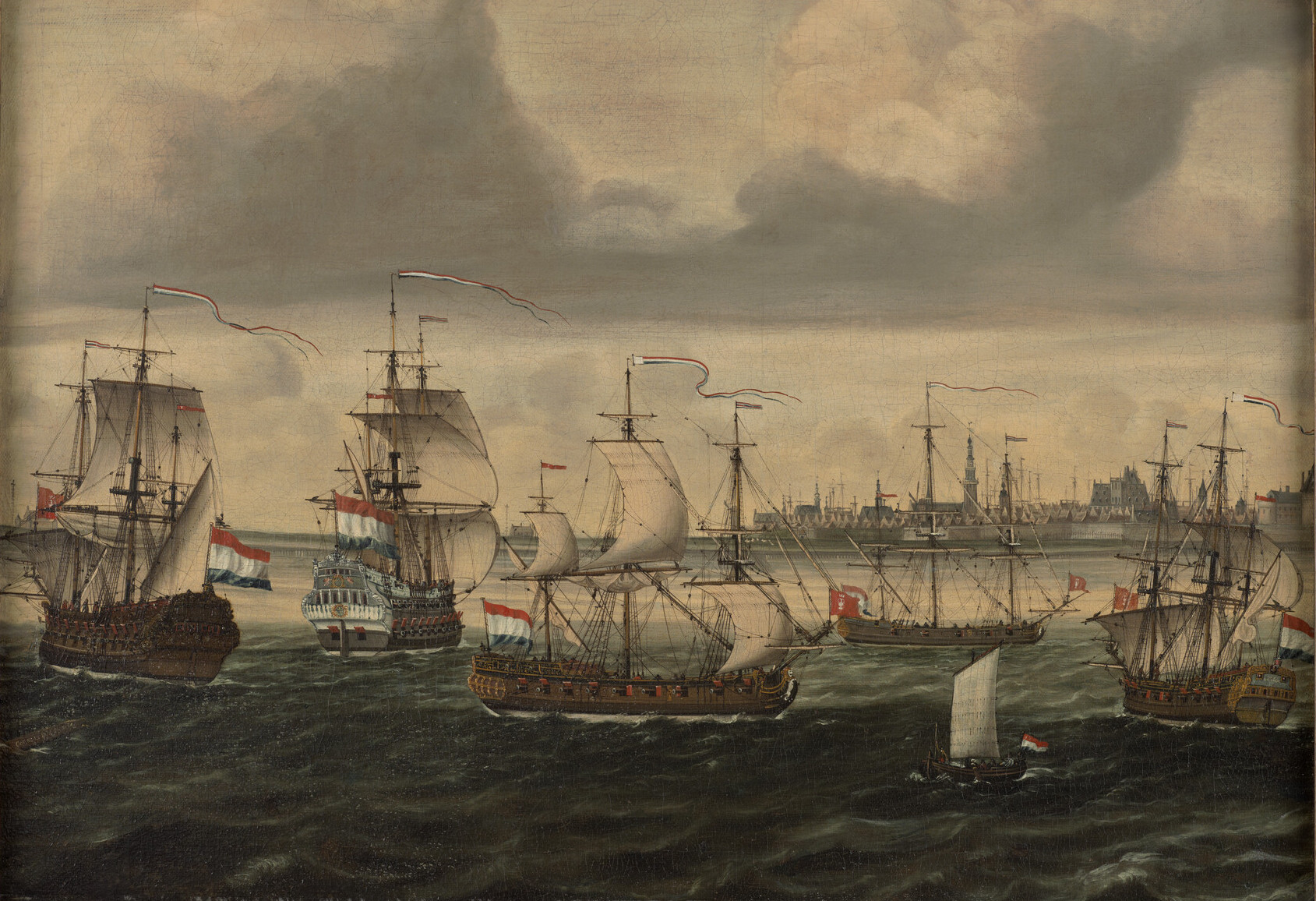
- Bourbon (second from left) being brought into the Vlissingen roadstead by the Dutch privateers Neptunus and Concordia in October 1702

History

France
- Name: Bourbon
- Ordered: 19 June 1692 (contract)
- Builder: Toulon arsenal
- Laid down: June 1692
- Launched: 17 November 1692
- Commissioned: February 1693
- Fate: Captured at the Battle of Vigo Bay on 23 October 1702 and burnt on 30 October

General characteristics
- Tonnage: 1,200
- Length: 140 French feet (Note: The French (pre-metric) foot was 6.575% longer than the equivalent English foot.)
- Beam: 38 French feet 4 inches
- Draught: 20-24½ French feet
- Depth of hold: 18 French feet
- Complement: 450 men (350 in peacetime), + 8 officers
- Armament: 68 guns

Bourbon was a ship of the line of the French Navy. She was armed with 68 guns, comprising twenty-six 24-pounder long guns on the lower gun deck and twenty-eight 12-pounder long guns on the upper gun deck, with eight 6-pounder long guns on the quarterdeck and six 6-pounder long guns on the forecastle.

Designed and built by François Coulomb, Bourbon was laid down at the Toulon arsenal in June 1692 as one of the replacements for the ships destroyed by an Anglo-Dutch attack at battles of Barfleur and La Hogue in June 1692. She was launched in November 1692 and commissioned into the French navy in February 1693.

Bourbon was captured by the Dutch warship De Zeven Provinciën at the battle of Vigo Bay on 23 October 1702 and burnt a week later.
