= François Louis Rousselet de Châteaurenault =

French Navy officer (1637–1716)

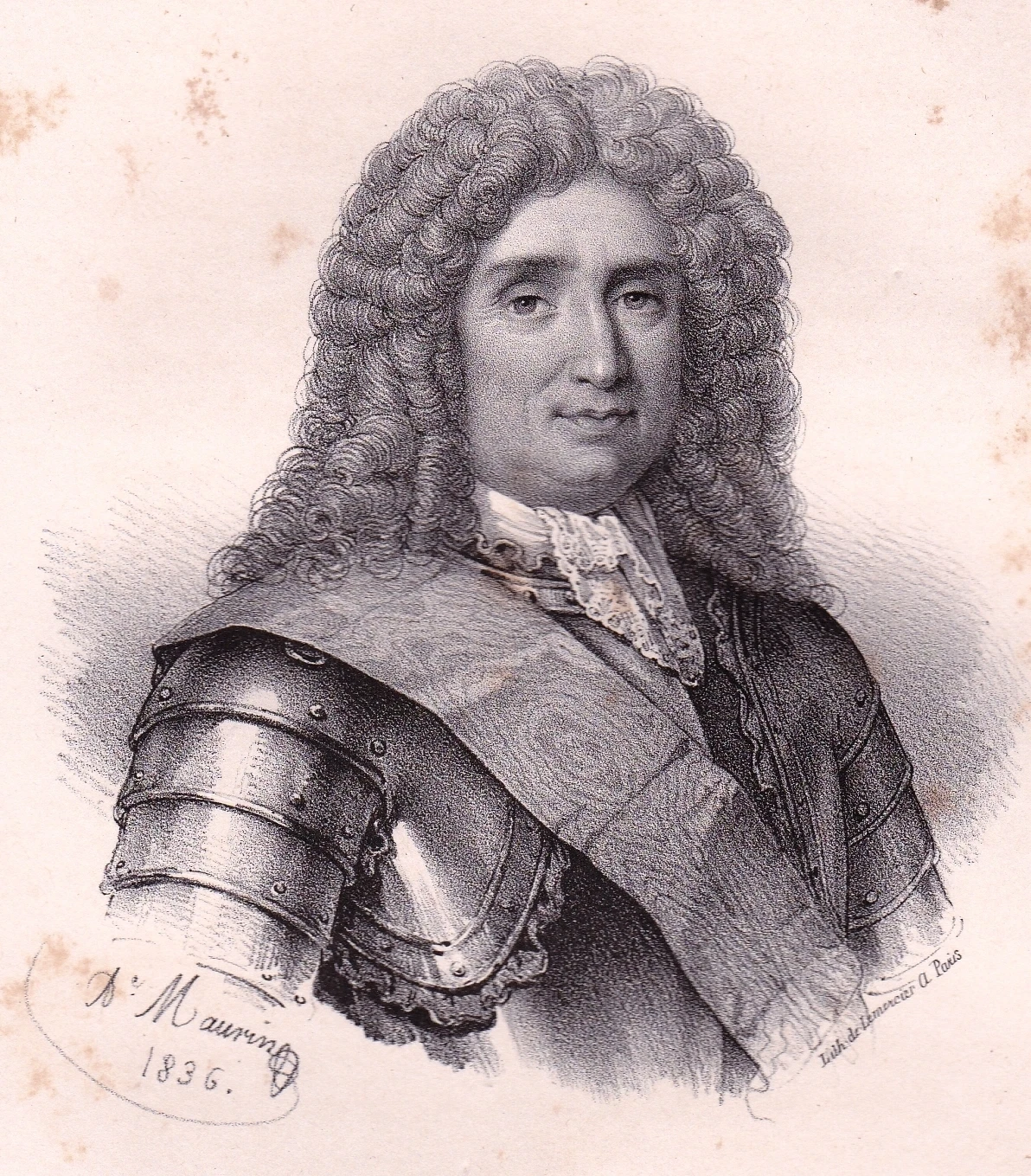
- Portrait by Antoine Maurin, 1836
- Born: 1637; Paris, France
- Died: 15 November 1716 (aged 78–79)
- Military career
- Allegiance: France
- Branch: French Navy
- Service years: 1661–1716
- Rank: Vice admiral
- Commands: Levant Fleet
- Conflicts: Franco-Spanish War (1635–1659); Battle of the Dunes (1658); Franco-Dutch War; Battle of Ushant; Nine Years' War; Battle of Bantry Bay; Battle of Beachy Head (1690); Battle of Lagos (1693); War of the Spanish Succession; Battle of Vigo Bay
- Awards: Order of the Holy Spirit; Order of Saint Louis; Order of Saint Lazarus

Vice-Admiral François-Louis Rousselet, marquis de Châteaurenault (1637 – 15 November 1716) was a French Navy officer who served in the Nine Years' War and War of the Spanish Succession.

== Biography ==
In his youth, he fought in the Battle of the Dunes (1658) against the Spanish. In 1661 he joined the French navy and distinguished himself in the conquest of Jijel under François de Vendôme, duc de Beaufort (23 July 1664). In 1672 he became captain of his own ship and fought in the Mediterranean against the pirates from Salé. In 1673 he led a squadron in the North Sea and fought against Michiel de Ruyter's Dutch fleet.

On 17 March 1678, Châteaurenault encountered a Dutch squadron of nine warships under Vice-Admiral Cornelis Evertsen the Younger while commanding six larger French warships. The Dutch were sailing to Cádiz to support Spain against France. The fleets engaged approximately 30 miles west of Ushant, where heavy seas prevented the use of their lower gun decks. After several hours of fighting, the French withdrew. The Dutch suffered 22 killed and 68 wounded and reached Cádiz on 26 March. Both sides claimed victory.

During the War of the Grand Alliance (War of the League of Augsburg), he landed a French army in Ireland after beating Admiral Herbert in the Battle of Bantry Bay. One year later, after the failure of this expedition, he evacuated the French army as well as 18.000 Irish. He then fought in the naval Battle of Beachy Head (1690) and the Battle of Lagos (1693). He was made vice-admiral in 1701, and commanded the French fleet during the Battle of Vigo Bay on 22 October 1702; his flagship there was the 70-gun Fort, which was burnt during the battle to avoid capture by the English.

He became a Marshal of France on 14 January 1703 and governor of Brittany in 1704. He was made a member of the Order of the Holy Spirit on 2 February 1705.

A number of ships of the French navy have been named Châteaurenault in his honour. Further, a street in Rennes has been named after him.

=== Marriage and children ===
On 7 September 1684 he had married Marie Anne de La Porte, vicomtesse d'Artois and dame de Crozon (1661–1696). They had :

- François-Louis-Ignace, killed in the Battle of Málaga (1704).
- Anne-Albert, Knight Hospitaller, died young in 1708.
- Louis Emmanuel, also pursued a career in the French Navy.
- Andrée-Marie-Dreuse, married Louis-Jean-Baptiste de Matignon, comte de Gacé.

== Sources ==
- Jonge, Johannes Cornelis de (1859). Geschiedenis van het Nederlandsche zeewezen Deel 2 (PDF) (in Dutch). A.C. Kruseman.
