= Hydroscope =

A hydroscope is any of several instruments related to water:

- One kind is an instrument for making observations below the surface of water, such as a long tube fitted with various lenses arranged so that objects lying at the bottom can be reflected upon a screen on the deck of the ship that carries it. These are built with a large tire tube that supports the screen and covered by an acrylic dome for protection.
- Another kind detects subsurface water through nuclear magnetic resonance using the surface nuclear magnetic resonance technique.
- An instrument (likely a hydrometer) described by Synesius in his Letter 15 to Hypatia, written in 402 AD. There are references to such instruments as early as the fourth century.
- Another ancient Greek instrument: a water clock or clepsydra.
