= Battle of Lagos (1693) =

1693 battle of the Nine Years' War

Coordinates: 37.0000°N 8.6667°W

- Part of the Nine Years' War
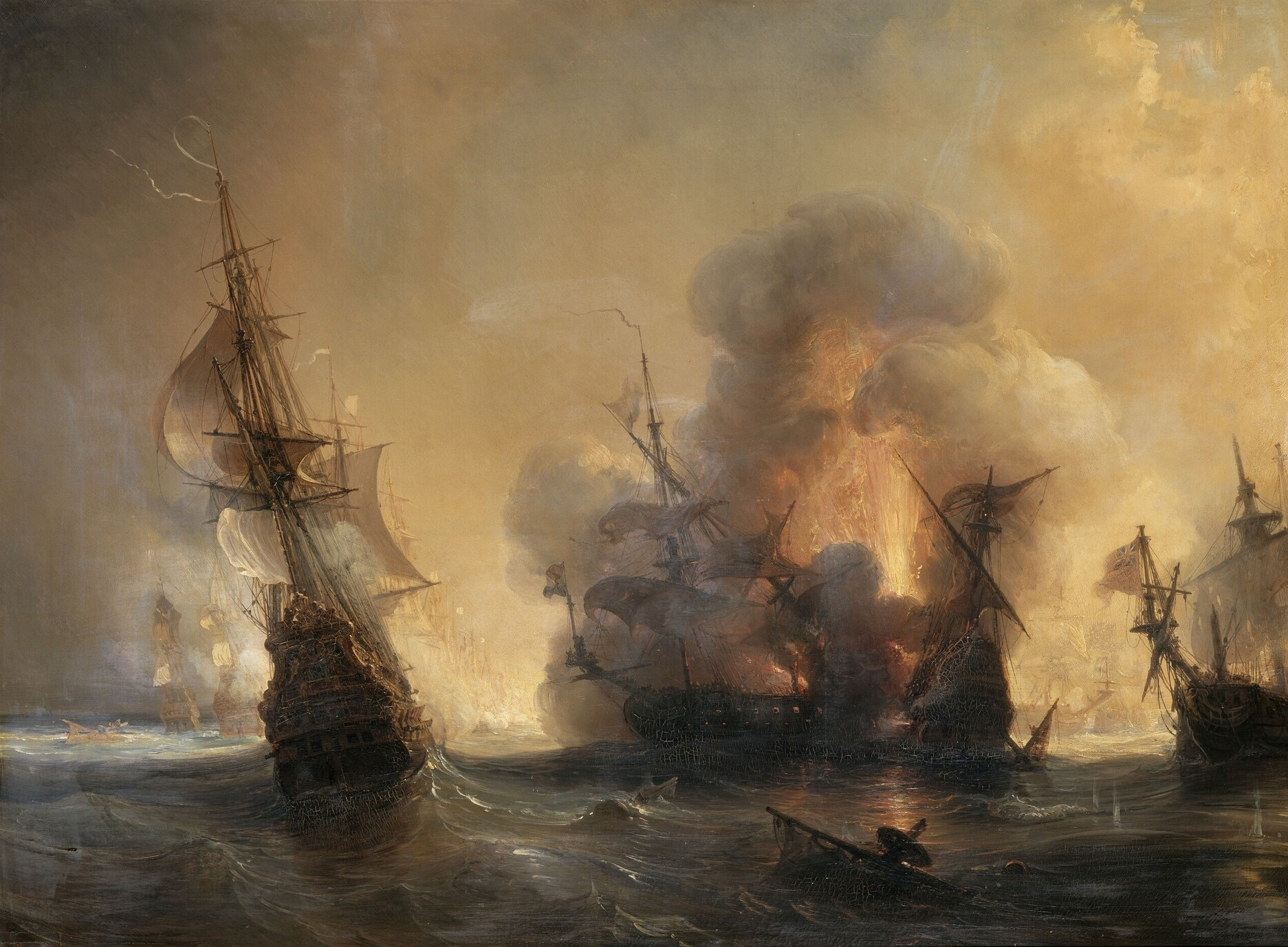
- Painting of the battle by Théodore Gudin
Date	27 June 1693 (17 June 1693 O.S.)
Location	Off Lagos, Atlantic Ocean
Result	French victory

Belligerents
France	England; Dutch Republic

Commanders and leaders
(Kingdom of France) Anne Hilarion de Tourville	(Kingdom of England) George Rooke (Dutch Republic) Philips van der Goes

Strength
70 ships of the line 30 smaller warships 30,000 crewmen	21 ships of the line 1 frigate 5 smaller warships 15,000 crewmen 200 merchant ships

Casualties and losses
500 killed or wounded	2,500 killed or wounded 2,000 captured 2 ships of the line captured 1 ship of the line destroyed 40 merchant ships captured 50 merchant ships destroyed

The Battle of Lagos was fought during the Nine Years' War on 27 June 1693 (17 June 1693 O.S.), when a French fleet under Anne Hilarion de Tourville defeated an Anglo-Dutch fleet under George Rooke near Lagos Bay in Portugal. Rooke's squadron was protecting the Smyrna convoy, and it is by this name that the action is sometimes known.

== Background ==
In the spring of 1693, a large convoy was organized to transport English and Dutch merchant ships which were bound for Spain and the Mediterranean; they had been held back by the threat of attack by the French fleet, or by commerce raiders.

The convoy, consisting of upwards of 200 sail, was to be escorted by a strong squadron of eight English and five Dutch ships of the line, with fireships, scouts and other auxiliaries, under the command of Vice-Admiral George Rooke and Rear Admiral Philips van der Goes. This squadron was bound for the Mediterranean, to take up station there. The convoy was to be covered by the combined allied fleet for its passage across the Channel, until it was past the port of Brest, to guard against attack by the French stationed there. The fleet, which was also charged with protecting England from the threat of invasion, would then double back to cover the Channel.

The French, however, whilst they had made good their losses of the previous year, had abandoned the intent to invade in favour of a guerre de course, a war against the allies' trade and commercial interests.

To this end, Louis XIV had dispatched the French fleet under Tourville, his most able commander, to set an ambush for the convoy before it entered the Straits of Gibraltar. By the end of May, Tourville had assembled a fleet of 70 ships of the line, plus fireships, stores vessels and other auxiliaries, about 100 sail in total; and taken up station near Lagos Bay in Portugal.

The convoy sailed at the end of May, with the allied fleet of 24 Dutch warships under Philips van Almonde and 45 English under a leadership committee of Admirals Henry Killigrew, Ralph Delaval and Cloudesley Shovell.

By 7 June (O.S) the convoy was about 150 miles southwest of Ushant, and the main allied fleet had turned back, leaving Rooke and the convoy to proceed south. The allies had made no move to check where the French fleet was, and received no news of its whereabouts until 17 June (O.S). By this time Rooke and the convoy were in action off Lagos, having been sighted by the French on the morning of 17 June (O.S).

== Battle ==
1848–1855 engraving of the battle

Rooke could not avoid battle, but held the advantage of being to windward. Ordering the merchant ships to disperse, his squadron took up battle positions, while withdrawing. The battle started around 8 pm. when the rear of his squadron was overtaken by the French van, led by Jean Gabaret. At the rear were two Dutch 64-gun ships: the Zeeland, commanded by Captain Philips Schrijver, and the Wapen van Medemblik, commanded by Captain Jan van der Poel.

When the French vanguard caught up with them, Schrijver and Van der Poel decided to sacrifice their ships. They turned towards the coast, drawing the pursuing French away from the fleeing convoy. The Zeeland initially managed to beat off the 66-gun Ardent, after which Admiral Gabaret joined the fight aboard the 92-gun Victorieux. Meanwhile, the Wapen van Medemblik took on the 100-gun Dauphin Royal. Eventually, around ten French warships descended upon the two Dutch ships.

After about an hour and a half, both heavily battered ships were forced to surrender, but their plan had worked. They had held up the French vanguard and given the remaining warships and much of the convoy time to escape. Rooke later called their manoeuvre “one of the best judged things I ever saw in action.” The French were equally impressed. When Schrijver was brought before Tourville as a prisoner, the French admiral embraced him and asked “whether he was a devil or a man,” saying that he had never seen anyone fight like that before.

The next day Rooke, with 54 merchant ships in company, was standing west. In pursuit were just four French warships. As they closed, Rooke's flagship, the Royal Oak (100) guns, turned to face them. After a short exchange they abandoned the chase and drew off. Rooke and his group were able to reach Madeira without further incident, where he found Monck (60) with one of the Dutch warships, and 40 or 50 merchant ships in company. With this party and stragglers collected en route, Rooke was able to reach Ireland on 30 July.

== Aftermath ==
While over half of the convoy was saved, some 90 ships were lost, the majority Dutch. 40 ships were taken as prizes by the French, the remainder destroyed. The two main goals of the convoy: first, to deliver the traders to their destinations in the Mediterranean and second, to establish a naval presence there, were defeated. For the French there was a huge gain, with prizes valued at 30 million livres. The City of London judged it the worst financial disaster since the Great Fire, 27 years previously.
