= Battles of Barfleur and La Hougue =

Battles of the Nine Years' War

- Part of the Nine Years' War
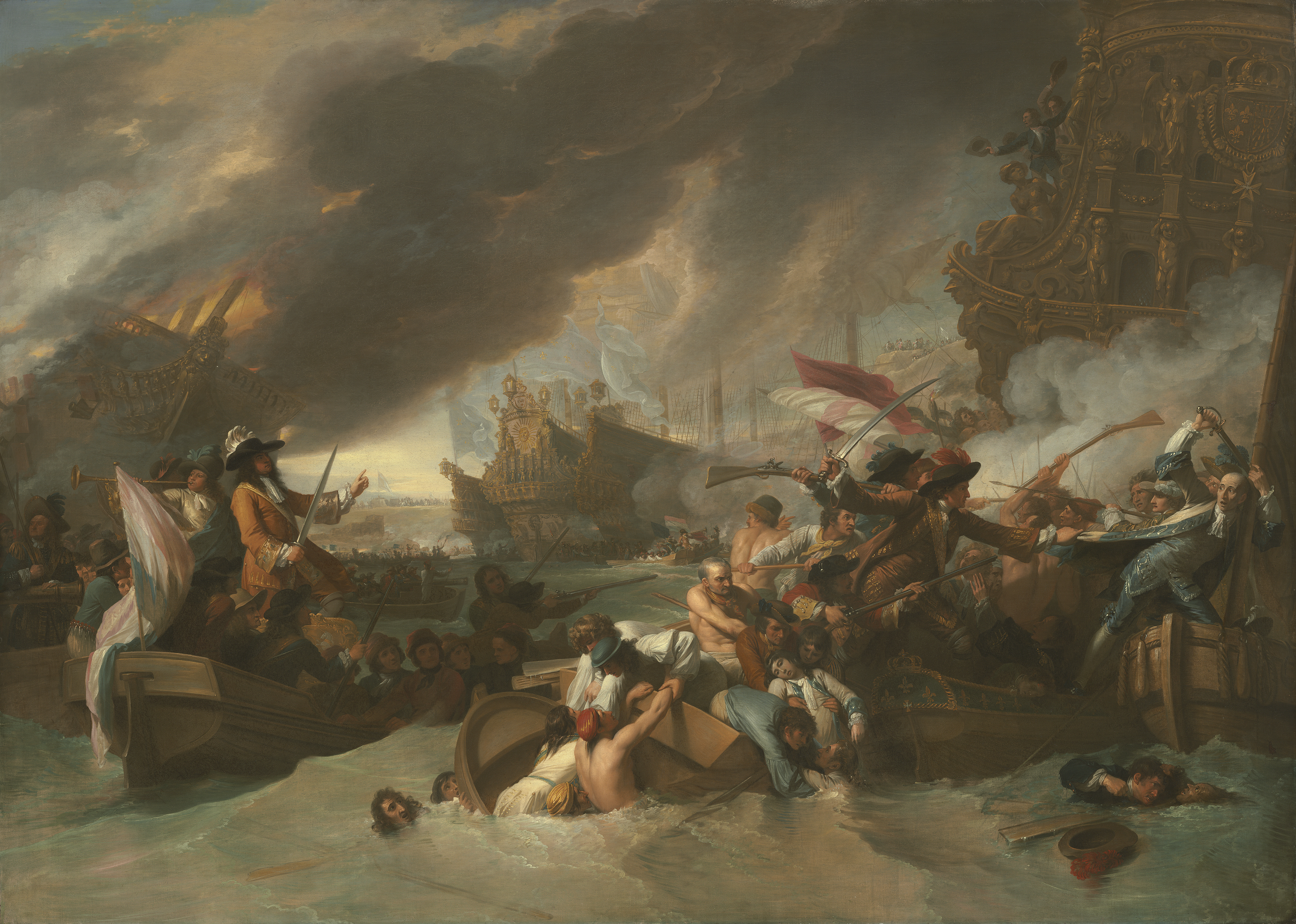
- The Battle of La Hogue; Benjamin West, 1778
Date	29 May – 14 June 1692
Location	English Channel and Normandy 49.6711°N 1.2633°W
Result	Anglo-Dutch victory

Belligerents
England; Dutch Republic	France

Commanders and leaders
(Kingdom of England) Edward Russell (Dutch Republic) Philips van Almonde	(Kingdom of France) Anne Tourville (Kingdom of France) Bernardin Bellefonds

Strength
82 ships of the line 3 fireships 39,000 men	44 ships of the line 2 frigates 1 fireship 21,000 men

Casualties and losses
5,000 killed or wounded 3 fireships destroyed	5,000 killed or wounded 15 ships of the line destroyed 2 frigates destroyed 1 fireship destroyed

The Battles of Barfleur and La Hougue took place during the Nine Years' War, between 19 May O.S. (29 May N.S.) and 4 June O.S. (14 June N.S.) 1692. The first was fought near Barfleur on 19 May O.S. (29 May N.S.), with later actions occurring between 20 May O.S. (30 May N.S.) and 4 June O.S. (14 June N.S.) at Cherbourg and Saint-Vaast-la-Hougue in Normandy, France.

The French attempt to restore James II to the English throne—the Williamite War in Ireland—ended in defeat in October 1691. Instead, a fleet of 44 ships of the line under Admiral de Tourville was to transport an invasion force commanded by Bernardin Gigault de Bellefonds. The Anglo-Dutch ships wintered in separate ports, and Tourville was ordered to put to sea as early as possible, hoping to intercept them before they could combine. However, when he finally did so in late May, the two fleets under Admiral Edward Russell had already met up and were 82 strong when they encountered the French off Cape Barfleur.

Following his instructions, Tourville attacked and inflicted numerous casualties to the Anglo-Dutch crews, but, after a clash that left many ships on both sides damaged, he ultimately disengaged. The Anglo-Dutch fleet pursued the outnumbered French into the harbours of Cherbourg and La Hougue, destroying a total of fifteen ships and ending the threat to England.

== Background ==
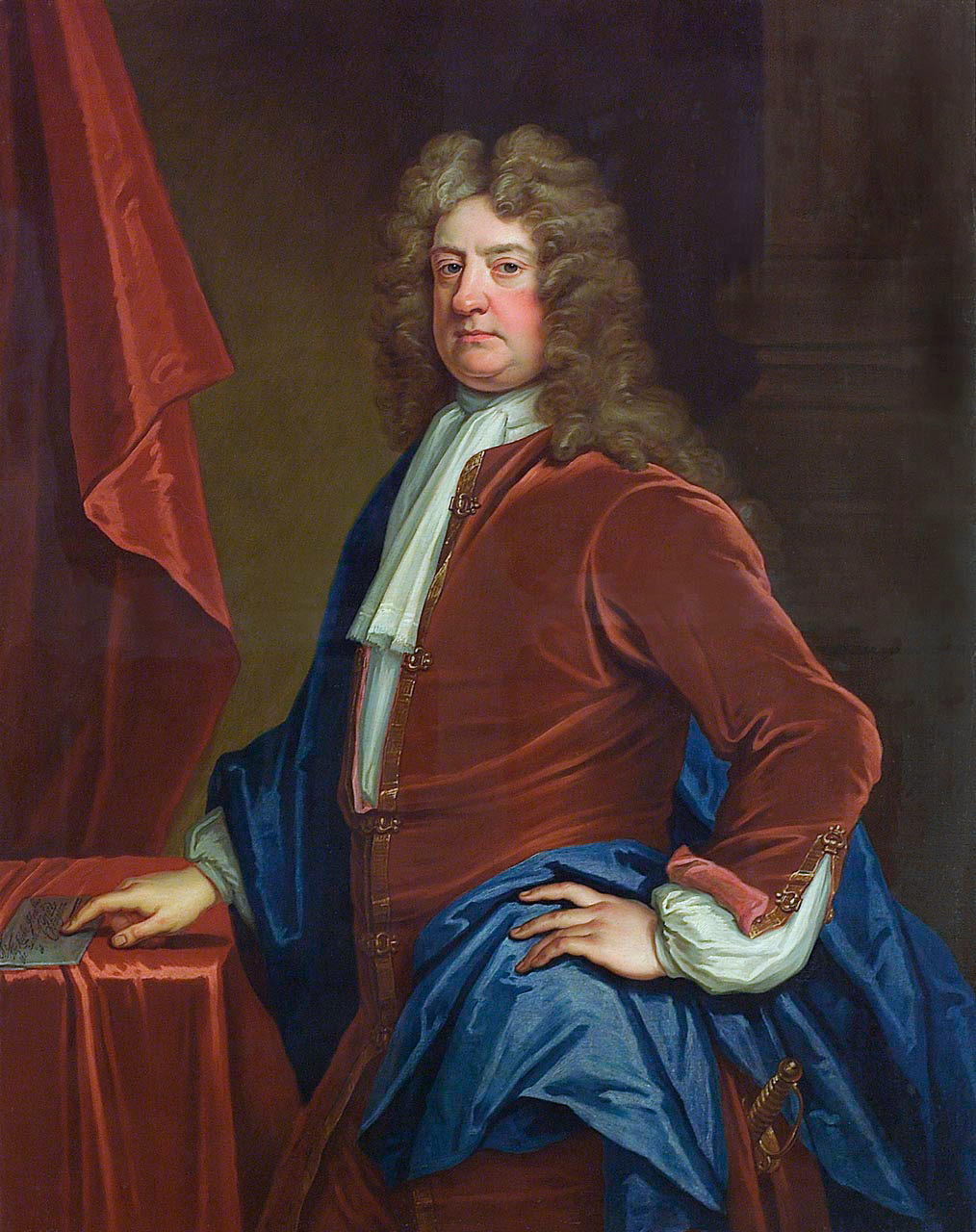
Portrait of Edward Russell by Thomas Gibson

The French victory at the Battle of Beachy Head two years earlier, in June 1690, had opened up the possibility of destroying a significant part of the Anglo-Dutch fleet and landing an invading army in England. King Louis XIV and his naval minister Louis Phélypeaux planned to land an army in England and restore James II to the throne. They planned to launch the invasion in April 1692, which was earlier than the separate English and Dutch fleets were expected to put to sea and combine. Much of the invasion force was to be made up of the Irish Royal Army which had gone into exile in the Flight of the Wild Geese after the siege of Limerick in 1691.

Troops were collected at Saint-Vaast-la-Hougue. The cavalry and guns were to be loaded into transports at Le Havre. The French commander Admiral Anne Hilarion de Tourville was to bring the French fleet up from Brest, collect the transports and the troops, then fight off the English fleet and land the army in England. Despite Tourville being in command of the fleet, strategic decisions were to be taken by James II, François d'Usson de Bonrepaus and Bernardin Gigault de Bellefonds.

However, the French fleet was unable to concentrate in time. D'Estrees and the Toulon fleet were beaten back at the Strait of Gibraltar, losing two ships in a storm, and Villette Mursay with the Rochefort squadron was delayed. Tourville's Brest fleet was undermanned, and when he sailed, on 4 May [O.S. 29 April], he was forced to leave 20 ships under François Louis Rousselet de Châteaurenault behind. His fleet was further delayed by adverse winds, and did not clear Berteaume Roads until 12 May.

Tourville entered the English Channel with 37 ships of the line, accompanied by seven fireships, plus frigates, scouts, and transports. He was joined on 15 May by Villette and the Rochefort squadron, seven ships of the line and attendant vessels, giving Tourville a combined fleet of 44 ships plus attendant vessels, 70 or 80 sail altogether. Meanwhile, the allied fleet was assembling at St Helens on the Isle of Wight. Vice Admiral of the Red Sir Ralph Delaval arrived on 8 May. Next day he was joined by Richard Carter, who had been in the western channel guarding a convoy, and delivering troops to Guernsey. The Dutch had despatched a fleet, under Philips van Almonde, from the Texel in April, which was making its way south. Admiral of the Blue Sir John Ashby sailed from the Nore on 27 April.

Admiral of the Fleet Edward Russell was delayed until 29 April, but gained time by making a risky passage through the Gull channel. He met Almonde at the Downs and a further Dutch squadron at Dungeness, arriving at St Helens in the second week of May. More detachments joined over the next few days, and by 14 May, Russell had a force of over 80 ships of the line, plus auxiliaries. Thus by 14 May, the allied fleet was fully assembled and the French strategic aim of acting with a concentrated force while the allies were scattered was already lost. However, Louis XIV had furnished Tourville with strict orders to seek battle, strong or weak (fort ou faible), and this he proceeded to do.

== Battle ==
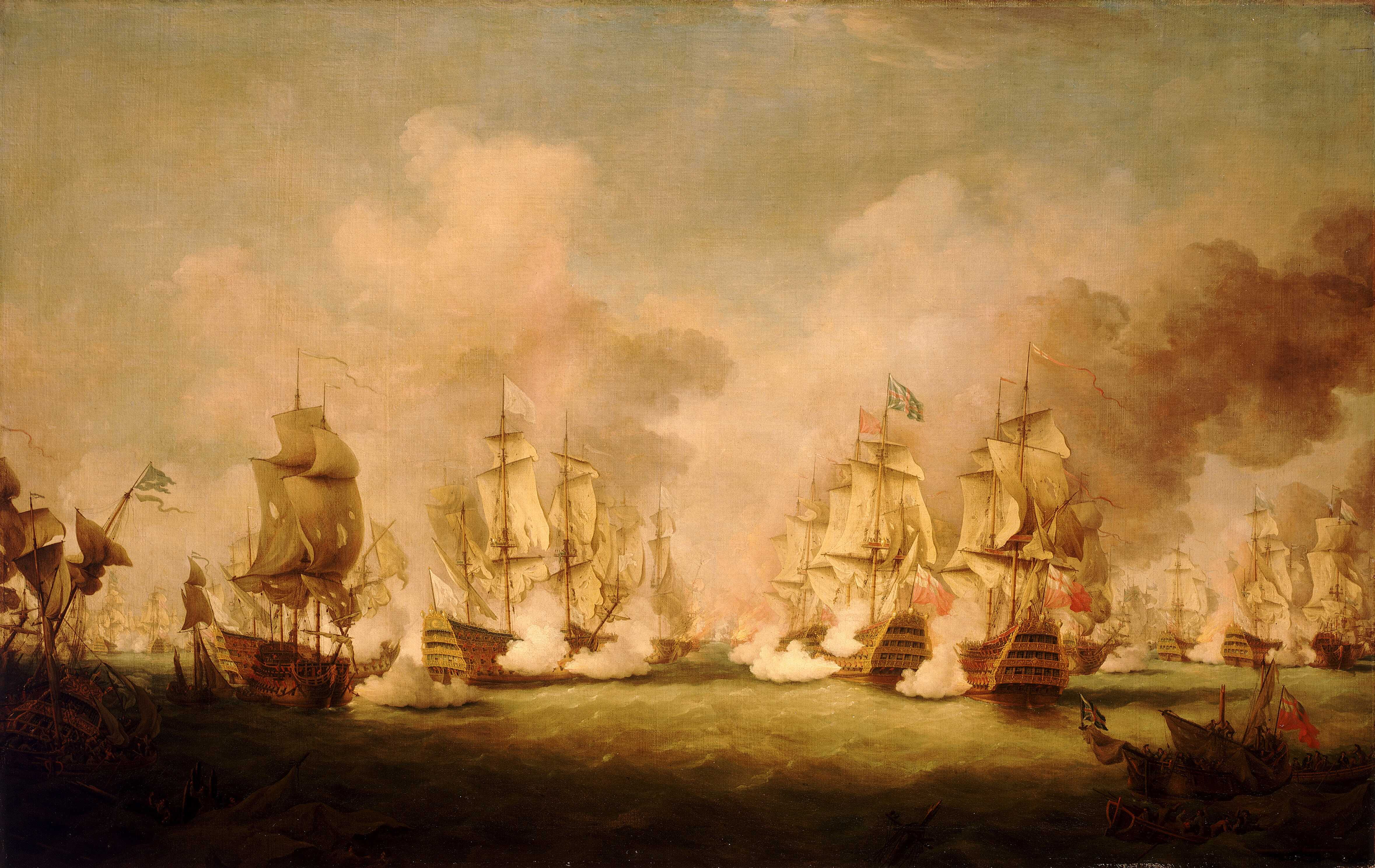
The Battle of Barfleur, 29 May 1692, painted by Richard Paton.

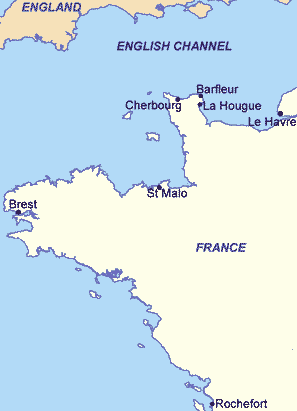
A map of Northern France, with the battle locations highlighted.

The fleets sighted each other at first light on 19 May, off Cap Barfleur. The story that Tourville then held a conference with his officers, whose advice, and his own opinion, was against action seems inaccurate in view of Tourville's strict orders from the king to engage. He had also been advised by James II's envoys to expect some defections by English captains with Jacobite sympathies, though none in fact did so. The fleets slowly closed in the light southwesterly breeze: Russell from the northeast, and Tourville, who had the weathergage, from the south, on a starboard tack to bring his line of battle into contact with Russell's. Both fleets were in three squadrons, each split into three divisions and commanded by a flag officer.

Owing to the calm conditions, it was not until after 10:00, four hours after first sighting each other, that the two fleets engaged. As long as he held the weathergage Tourville was able to break off the engagement when he had carried out his orders to damage the enemy. He had reinforced his centre, the White squadron under his own command, in order to engage Russell's Red squadron with close to equal numbers. Elsewhere, he sought to minimise damage by extending and refusing the van, to avoid them being turned and overwhelmed, while the rear was held back to keep the weathergage. Russell countered by holding fire as long as possible, to allow the French to come closer. Almonde, in the van, extended to try to overlap the French line, while Ashby, with the rear and some way off, sought to close and bring his Blue squadron into action. From around 11:00, and for the next few hours, both fleets bombarded each other, causing considerable damage.

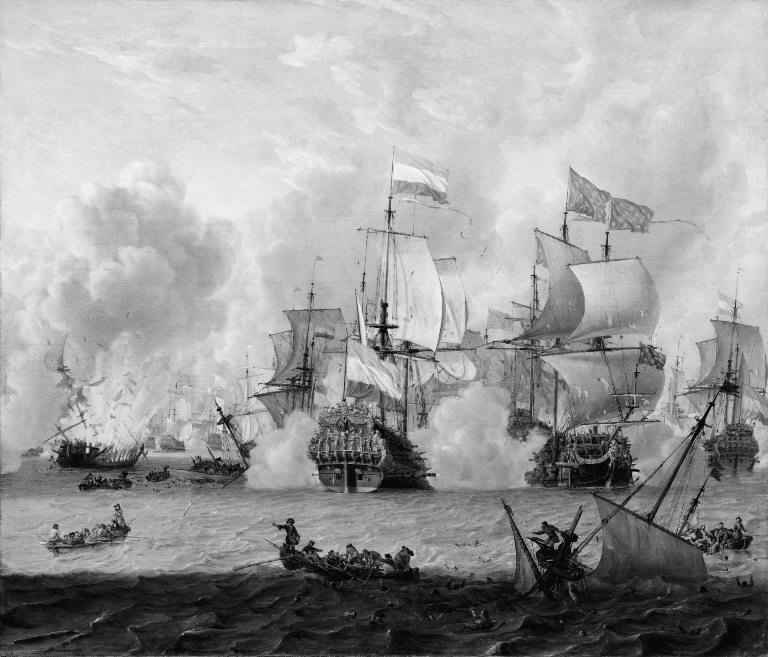
Dutch and French ships at Barfleur, by Abraham Storck.

The battle continued for the rest of the day and into the night, and was full of incident. At 13:00, a change in the wind allowed Rear Admiral of the Red Sir Cloudesley Shovell to break the French line and the Dutch to start enveloping the French van. A flat calm descended at 16:00, leaving both fleets in a fog. At 18:00, Tourville was able to use the tide to gain a respite, and Shovell used the same tide at 20:00 for a fireship attack.

By 18:00, the battle was almost over. Surprisingly, though most ships on both sides were damaged, some severely, no ships from either battle line were lost. At the turn of the tide, Tourville again took advantage of this to cut cables and be carried down channel on the ebb, away from the scene of battle. Russell also cut when he realised what had happened, in order to give chase into the night. On 30 May, the French withdrawal was hampered by wind and tide and by the fact that, due to cost concerns by the French Naval Ministry, many of the ships had anchors inadequate to withstand the strong tidal races in the region. The nearest French port, Cherbourg was not fortified.

=== Pursuit ===
The Battle of Barfleur, by Ludolf Bakhuizen

First light on 20 May saw the French fleet scattered into groups across a wide area. To the north of the battle scene, and heading northward, were Gabaret and Langeron, with four ships between them. They skirted the English coast later that day, and headed out into the Atlantic. Eventually they would arrive safely at Brest. To the south, Nesmond was heading south-east towards the Normandy coast with six ships. Two of these would be beached at Saint-Vaast-la-Hougue, while another two would later put into Le Havre, one of which, L’Entendu, was wrecked at the harbour entrance. Nesmond, with the remaining two ships Monarque and Aimable, passed through the Strait of Dover, went north around Britain and finally arrived safely at Brest. Heading west was the main body in three groups: Villette leading with fifteen ships, followed by d’Amfreville with twelve, and Tourville bringing up the rear with seven. The French were able to close up during the day, but Tourville was hampered by his efforts to save his flagship, Soleil Royal, which was in a pitiable condition. He recognised this later that day, and transferred his flag to L’Ambiteux.

On 21 May, the French fleet was anchored against the tide off Cap de la Hague. The leading contingent, twenty-one ships, now under Pannetier, had rounded the cape and was in the Alderney Race, while the remainder, thirteen with Tourville and the other flag officers, were to the east. As the weather deteriorated, these ships began to drag their anchors and were forced to cut and run before the wind and tide. Russell pursued Tourville eastward along the Cotentin coast. Tourville, without anchors, was unable to do more than beach his ships. Three of the most badly damaged were forced to beach at Cherbourg. The rest, ten ships, reached St Vaast la Hougue where they too were beached, joining the two of Nesmond's division that were already there. Russell and the ships with him, together with some of Ashby's Blue squadron, also cut to pursue him, while Ashby and Almonde continued to shadow Pannetier's group.

Pannetier, in order to escape the pursuing allied fleet, sought to make the hazardous passage through the Alderney Race. In this he was helped by finding in his crew a local man, Hervé Riel, to act as pilot when his navigators demurred. Almonde and Ashby did not try to follow him. They were criticised later by Russell for not doing so, although the only flag officer who knew the waters, Carter, had died of his wounds. Almonde attempted pursuit by taking his squadron west of Alderney, but the delay allowed Pannetier to pull too far ahead, and Almonde abandoned the chase. Pannetier later reached Saint-Malo and safety, while Almonde and Ashby turned east to rejoin Russell at La Hougue.

The Soleil Royal, Admirable, and Triomphant were in such bad shape they had to be beached at Cherbourg. They were destroyed there the next day, 23 May, by Vice-Admiral Delaval, attacking from long boats and with fireships. Meanwhile, Russell had turned on the remaining ships. These had sought refuge at La Hougue where they would be under the protection of the assembled land forces and a battery. On 3 June and 4 June, the Dutch and English attacked with long boats. By this time, the French crews were exhausted and disheartened. The allies successfully deployed shore parties and fireships that burnt all twelve French ships of the line which had sought shelter there. This last action became celebrated in England as the Battle of La Hougue.

== Aftermath ==
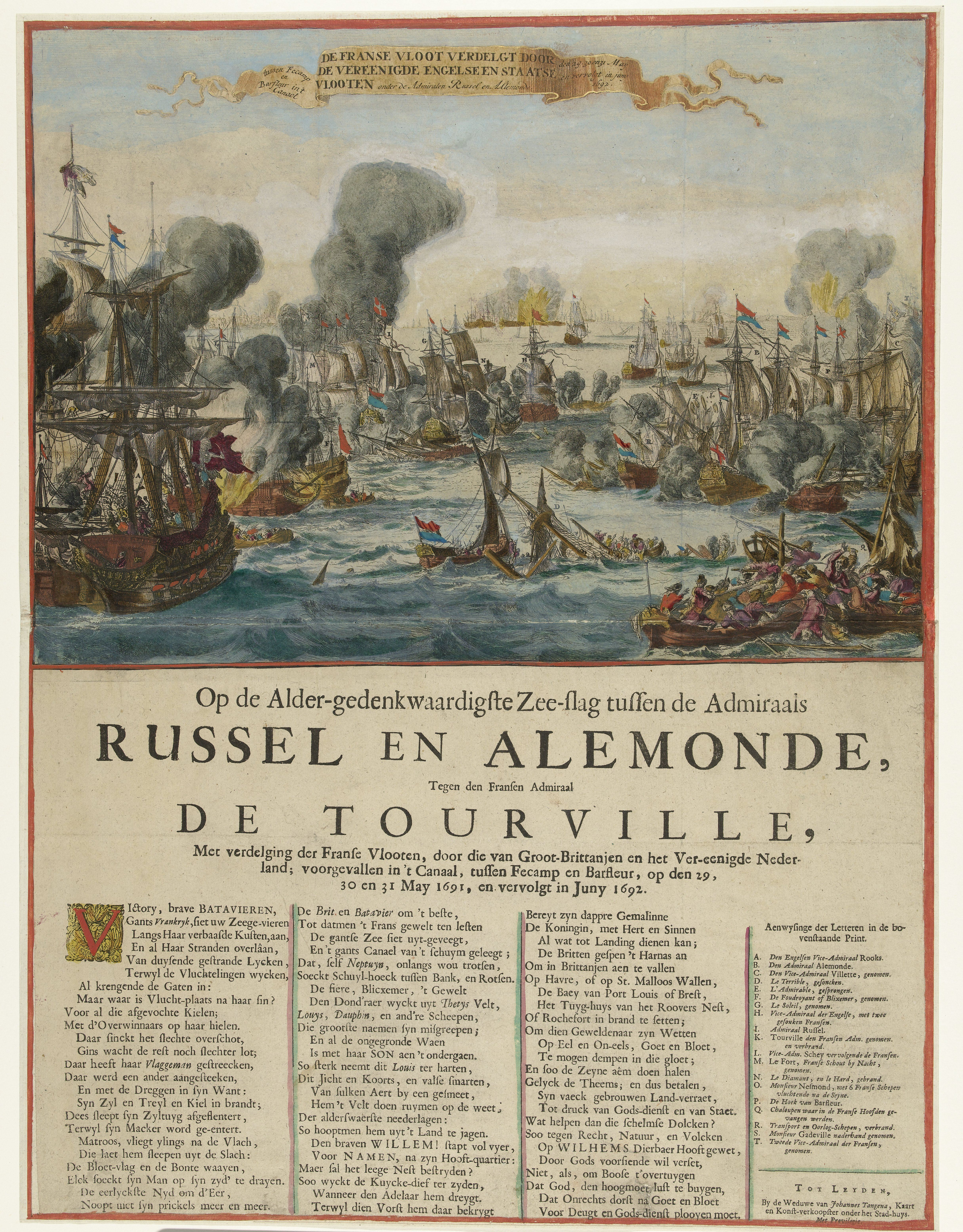
Dutch news pamphlet about the battle, by Romeyn de Hooghe.

The dispersal of the French fleet put an end to the invasion plans, and the Allied victory was commemorated in England by a fleet review. Following the battle, the French abandoned the idea of seeking naval superiority for its own sake, adopting instead a continental strategy on land and pursuing a war against trade at sea. The battle is seen differently on either side of the English Channel. The English have seen the action as a single action over six days; it has often been referred to as the battle of La Hougue, or simply Hougue. On the other hand, the French have seen the various actions as separate battles, of Barfleur, Cherbourg and La Hougue. However, more neutral observers, such as Mahan, have also seen the action as a whole, as does Pemsel, and naval actions over a period of days were not unusual for the time.

Each side regards the outcome differently. The English claim this as an outright victory. The French, while acknowledging La Hougue and Cherbourg as defeats, prefer to claim Barfleur as a victory. The English view of this as an out-and-out victory, while plausible tactically, is flawed strategically. In earlier times it was widely celebrated, though by Mahan's time it was seen as less important. The French invasion plan was foiled, but La Hougue was not the devastating blow to the French Navy it was once thought. French losses were quickly made good, and by the following year Tourville was able to inflict a defeat on the Allies in the battle of Lagos. Although the French dropped their invasion plans for the rest of the conflict and switched to a guerre de course, this was a matter of policy rather than necessity.

However, the French view of the action at Barfleur as a victory is similarly flawed. The actions at Cherbourg and La Hougue can only be seen as defeats, but the view of the action at Barfleur as a victory is not tenable. The strategic aim, to concentrate the fleet and seize control of the channel before the allied fleet had assembled, had already failed by 14 May, and the chance for invasion was lost even if the battle had never taken place. Tactically Tourville made the best he could of a difficult situation. He made skilled use of the tides, first to disengage his fleet and, later to escape, but with no ships lost on either side and the action ending with Russell in hot pursuit, it can be seen at best as inconclusive. Nevertheless, historians have generally acknowledged the skill, bravery, courage and ferocious fighting ability of the French in this action. Barfleur remains an action which is celebrated in France, while the English complained of a lack of spirit among their captains and two lieutenants were court martialled and dismissed from the navy for retreating from the battle after their captains were incapacitated.

Winston Churchill stated that:

The battle of Cape La Hougue, with its consequential actions ... broke decisively for the whole of the wars of William and Anne all French pretensions to supremacy at sea. It was the Trafalgar of the seventeenth century.

— Winston Churchill

== Sources ==
- Aubrey, P. (1979). The Defeat of James Stuart's Armada, 1692. Leicester University Press. ISBN 0-7185-1168-9.
- Castex, R. (1994). Strategic Theories. Naval Institute Press. ISBN 9781557501004.
- Churchill, Winston S. (2014) [1933]. "Chapter Twenty-four: The Tower 1692–1693". Marlborough: His Life and Times. Vol. 1. Rosetta Books. ISBN 9780795329883.
- Harding, R. (2002). Seapower and Naval Warfare, 1650–1830. Abingdon: Routledge. ISBN 9781135364861.
- Jenkins, E.H. (1973). A History of the French Navy. ISBN 0-3560-4196-4.
- Rodger, N.A.M. (2004). The Command of The Ocean. Allen Lane. ISBN 0-7139-9411-8.
- Mahan, A.T. (1980). The Influence of Sea-Power upon History, 1660–1805. Hamlyn. ISBN 0-600-34162-3.
- Pemsel, Helmut (1977). Atlas of Naval Warfare. Arms and Armour Press. ISBN 0-85368-351-4.
- de Jonge, Johannes Cornelis (1860). Geschiedenis van het Nederlandsche zeewezen Deel 3 (PDF) (in Dutch). A.C. Kruseman.
- Bodart, Gaston (1908). Militär-historisches Kriegs-Lexikon (1618–1905).
