= Roquefeuil =

Roquefeuil may refer to:

- Roquefeuil, Aude, a commune in Aude, France.
- House of Roquefeuil-Anduze, a noble family which appeared in 1150.
- House of Roquefeuil-Blanquefort, a noble family from Languedoc, France which succeeded to the Roquefeuil-Anduze family in 1383.
