= French ship Royal Louis =

It was a tradition in the French Royal Navy to name the largest ship Royal Louis after the French monarch; all Kings of France were named "Louis" from 1610 until the end of the French monarchy. At least six ships bore this name:

- French ship Royal Louis (1668)
- French ship Royal Louis (1692)
- French ship Royal Louis (1743)
- French ship Royal Louis (1759)
- French ship Royal Louis (1780)
- French ship Impérial of 1811 was renamed Royal Louis in April 1814 (when Napoléon was reinstated, she reverted to Impérial in March 1815, but was again renamed Royal Louis in July 1815).
