= List of French explorers =

The following is a list of French people known as explorers.

== Before 1500 ==
- Jean de Béthencourt (Canary Islands)
- Gadifer de la Salle (Canary Islands)

== 16th century ==
- Thomas Aubert (Newfoundland)
- Jacques Cartier (North America)
- Philippe de Corguilleray (Brazil)
- Joseph de La Roche Daillon (North America)
- François Le Grout du Closneuf (Indian Ocean)
- Jean Ribault (North America)

== 17th century ==
- Michel Aco (Mississippi River)
- Philippe Avril (Near East, Russia)
- Jean Barbot (West Africa)
- Nicolas Barré (Brazil)
- Augustin de Beaulieu (Sumatra)
- Étienne Brûlé (North America)
- François Caron (Indonesia, Japan)
- François Cauche (Indian Ocean, Madagascar)
- René-Robert Cavelier, Sieur de La Salle (North America)
- François Gravé Du Pont
- Samuel de Champlain (North America)
- Jean Chardin (Iran, India)
- Daniel de la Rivardière (South America)
- Simon François Daumont de Saint-Lusson (North America)
- Nicolas Denys (North America)
- Sieur Dubois (Indian Ocean, Madagascar, Réunion)
- Médard Chouart des Groseilliers (North America)
- Henri Joutel (North America)
- François de La Boullaye-Le Gouz (Iran)
- Jacques Marquette (North America)
- Jean Nicolet (North America)

== 18th century ==
- Jeanne Baré (circumnavigation)
- Nicolas Baudin (Indian Ocean, Australia)
- Jean-Baptiste Bénard de la Harpe (North America)
- Louis Blanchette (North America)
- Joseph Hugues Boissieu La Martinière (Pacific Ocean)
- Louis Antoine de Bougainville (circumnavigation)
- Étienne de Veniard, Sieur de Bourgmont (North America)
- Antoine Bruni d'Entrecasteaux (Indian Ocean, Pacific Ocean)
- Pierre Carré de Luzançay (Indian Ocean, Pacific Ocean)
- Pierre Céloron de Blainville (North America)
- Charles Pierre Claret de Fleurieu (oceans, New Guinea)
- Philibert Commerson (circumnavigation, Indian Ocean)
- Julien Crozet (Indian Ocean, Antarctic)
- Joachim Darquistade (South America)
- Michel Dubocage (Pacific Ocean)
- Abraham Duquesne-Guitton (Australia)
- Louis Feuillée (Antilles, South America)
- Paul Antoine Fleuriot de Langle (Pacific Ocean)
- Alexandre d'Hesmivy d'Auribeau (Pacific Ocean)
- Louis de l'Isle (Siberia, North America)
- Jean Gilbert Nicomède Jaime (West Africa)
- Charles Marie de La Condamine (South America)
- Charles Joseph Lambert (Egypt, Sudan)
- Jean-François de La Pérouse (Pacific Ocean)
- Francis de Laporte de Castelnau (South America)
- Antoine-Simon Le Page du Pratz (North America)
- Lazare Picault (Indian Ocean)
- Jean-François de Surville (Pacific Ocean)

== 19th century ==
- Antoine Thomson d'Abbadie (Ethiopia)
- Alexandre d'Albéca (Bénin)
- Jacques Arago (circumnavigation)
- Léonie d'Aunet (Spitsbergen)
- Charles Babin (Iran)
- Francis Barrallier (Australia)
- Ferdinand de Béhagle (Central Africa)
- Joseph René Bellot (Arctic)
- Paul Blanchet (Sahara)
- Jules de Blosseville (Arctic)
- Charles Eudes Bonin (East Asia)
- Aimé Bonpland (South America)
- Gabriel Bonvalot (Central Asia, Tibet)
- Ismaël Bou Derba (Sahara)
- Édouard Bouët-Willaumez (West Africa)
- Jules Braouezec (West Africa, Central Africa)
- Frédéric Cailliaud (Egypt, Sudan, Ethiopia)
- René Caillié (West Africa)
- Ernest Carette (Algeria)
- Edmond Caron (West Africa)
- Jean Chaffanjon (South America, Central Asia)
- Paul Du Chaillu (Central Africa, Scandinavia)
- Désiré Charnay (Mexico)
- Alfred Le Chatelier (Africa)
- Victor de Compiègne (Central Africa)
- Henri Coudreau (South America)
- Paul Crampel (Central Africa)
- Jules Crevaux (South America)
- Armand David (East Asia)
- Louis Delaporte (Southeast Asia)
- Georges Destenave (West Africa, Central Africa)
- Ernest Doudart de Lagrée (Southeast Asia)
- Francis Garnier (Southeast Asia)
- Pierre-Médard Diard (Southeast Asia)
- Albert Dolisie (Central Africa)
- Ernest Doudart de Lagrée (Southeast Asia)
- Camille Douls (North Africa)
- Jean Duchesne-Fournet (Ethiopia)
- Jules Dumont d'Urville (Pacific Ocean, Antarctic)
- Auguste Duhaut-Cilly (Canary Islands, California)
- Louis Isidore Duperrey (Pacific Ocean)
- Abel Aubert du Petit-Thouars (Pacific Ocean)
- Paul Flatters (Sahara)
- Charles de Foucauld (North Africa)
- Fernand Foureau (Africa)
- Alfred Fourneau (Central Africa)
- Louis de Freycinet (Pacific Ocean)
- Joseph Paul Gaimard (Arctic)
- Émile Gentil (Central Africa)
- Henri Grout de Beaufort (West Africa)
- Charles Guillain (East Africa, Indian Ocean)
- Jules Harmand (Southeast Asia)
- Xavier Hommaire de Hell (Russia, Iran)
- Évariste Huc (China, Mongolia)
- François-Joseph-Amédée Lamy (Africa)
- Jean-Baptiste Marchand (Africa)
- Parfait-Louis Monteil (Africa)
- Joseph Nicollet (North America)
- Camille de Roquefeuil (circumnavigation, Pacific Ocean)
- Auguste Pavie (Southeast Asia)

== 20th century ==
- Jean Alt (Antarctica)
- Louis Audouin-Dubreuil (Sahara)
- Louis Brusset (Sahara)
- Jean-Baptiste Charcot (Arctic, Antarctic)
- Norbert Casteret (Caves)
- Pierre Chevalier (caver) (Caves)
- Raymond Coche (Sahara)
- Alexandra David-Néel (East Asia)
- Jean-Louis Étienne (Arctic, Antarctic)
- Bertrand Flornoy (South America)
- Édouard-Alfred Martel (Caves)
- Raymond Maufrais (South America)
- Théodore Monod (Sahara)
- Paul Pelliot (Central Asia)
- Haroun Tazieff (Volcanos and caves)
- Paul-Émile Victor (Arctic, Antarctic)

== See also ==
- List of explorers
