= Levant Fleet =

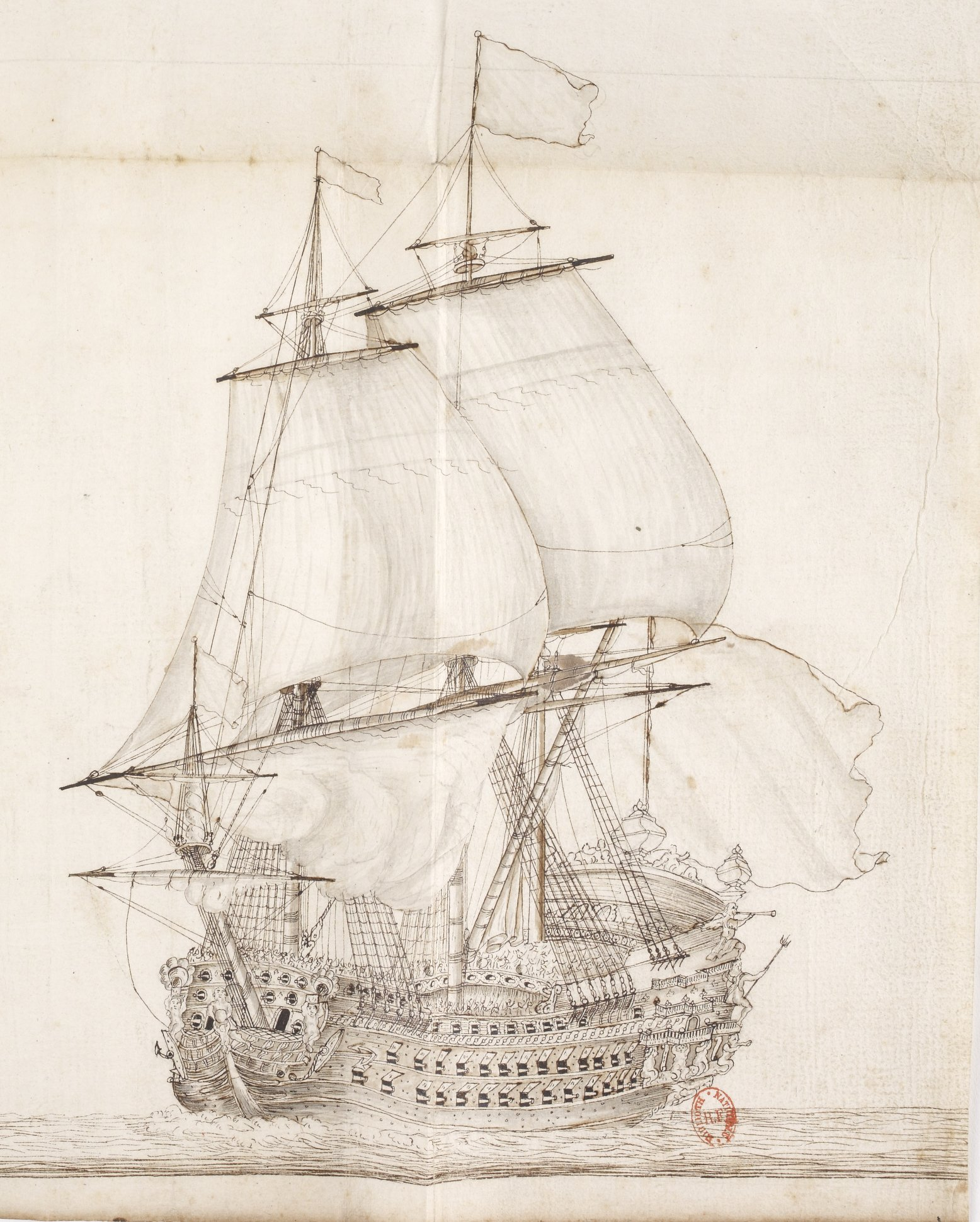
- Royal Louis, flagship of the Levant Fleet under Louis XIV
- Active: 1689–1792
- Country: Kingdom of France
- Branch: (Kingdom of France) Royal French Navy
- Type: Naval fleet
- Role: Naval operations in the Mediterranean
- Garrison/HQ: Arsenal of Toulon; Arsenal of Galères
- Engagements: Franco-Dutch War; Nine Years' War; War of the Spanish Succession; War of the Austrian Succession; Seven Years' War; American War of Independence

The Levant Fleet (French: Flotte du Levant) was the designation under the Ancien Regime for the naval vessels of the Royal French Navy in the Mediterranean. The fleet carried out operations such as asserting naval supremacy and protecting convoys. Its counterpart was the Ponant Fleet, which saw service in the English Channel and in the Atlantic Ocean.

== Arsenals ==
At first based in Fréjus, from the beginning of the 17th century the fleet was based at two specialized arsenals:

- At Marseille, for galleys (from 1665 to 1750)
- At Toulon, for the sailing ships

== Flagships ==
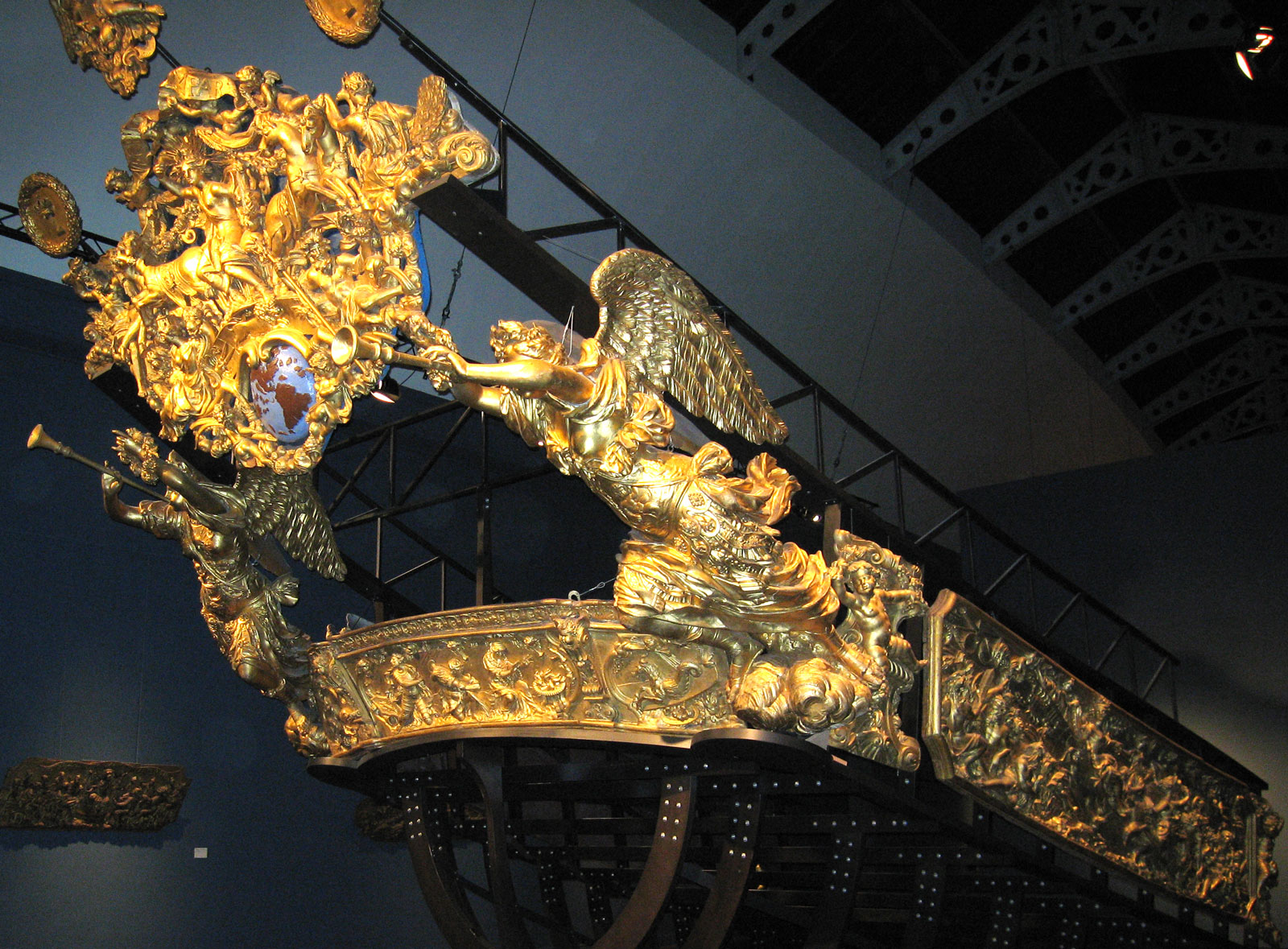
The stern of Louis XIV's Réale.

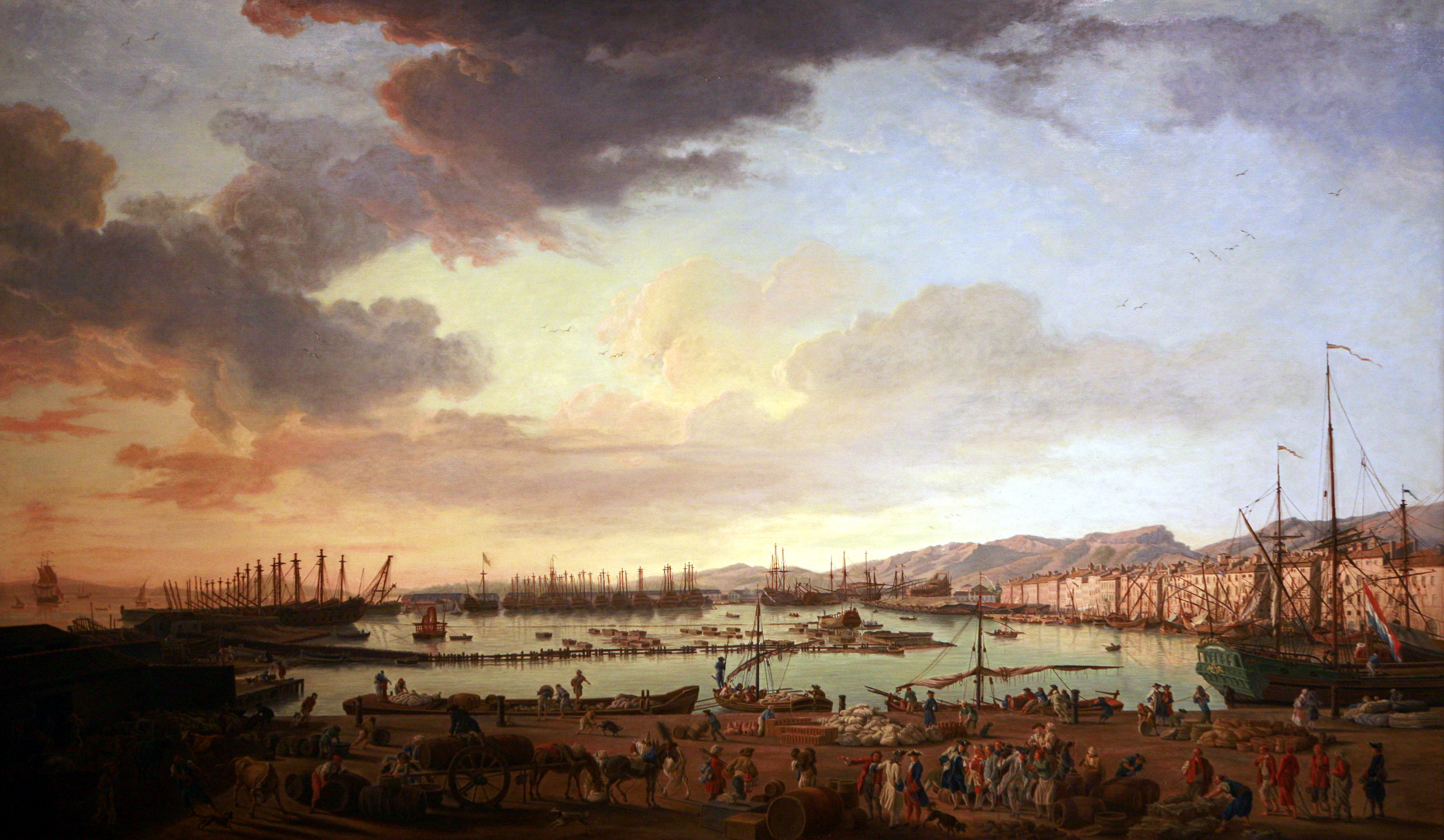
General view of the port of Toulon in the middle of the 18th century.

The fleet's flagship was traditionally the Réale, flying the flag of général des galères (a grand-officer of the crown of France), as seen at the Musée national de la Marine.

The flagship was always the most powerful ship present in Toulon. Under Louis XIV this was the either 110-gun Royal Louis constructed in 1667 and destroyed in 1690 or her successor, also named Royal Louis, constructed in 1692. The gun decks of these vessels were painted red, upper decks in blue, picked out with gilding. Under Louis XVI the flagships were the 110-gun Majestueux constructed in 1780 and then the 118-gun Océan-class Commerce de Marseille constructed in 1788.

== Vice admirals ==
The command of the Levant and the Ponant fleets were entrusted on 12 November 1669 to two vice-admirals. The first vice-admiral of the Levant was Anne Hilarion de Costentin, Comte de Tourville, designated as such in 1669. Louis XIV had intended to appoint Abraham Duquesne to share the post, but he died in 1688, and the Comte de Tourville continued in the post until 1701.

Name	Portrait	Tenure	Note
Anne Hilarion de Costentin, Comte de Tourville (1624–1701)		1669–1701	Tenure at age 45 until 1701
François Louis Rousselet de Châteaurenault (1637–1716)		1701–1716	Tenure at age 63 until 1716
Alain Emmanuel de Coëtlogon (1646–1730)		1716–1730	Tenure at age 70 until 1730
Charles de Sainte-Maure, Marquis d'Augé; Marquis d'Augé (1655–1744)	-	1730–1744	Tenure at age 75 until 1744
Gaspard de Goussé de La Roche-Allard (1664–1745)	-	1745-1745	Tenure at age 81 and died one week later
Vincent de Salaberry de Benneville (1663–1750)	-	1750	Tenure at age 86
Pierre de Blouet de Camilly (1666–1753)		1751–1753	Tenure at age 85 until 1753
Jean-André Barrailh (1672–1762)	-	1753–1762	Tenure at age 82 until 1762
Emmanuel-Auguste de Cahideuc, Comte Dubois de la Motte; Count Dubois de la Motte (1683–1764)	-	1762–1764	Tenure at age 79 until 1764
Claude Louis d'Espinchal, Marquis de Massiac (1686–1770)	-	1764–1770	Tenure at age 78 until 1770
Anne Antoine, Comte d'Aché de Maubeuf (1701–1780)	-	1770–1780	Tenure at age 69 until 1780
Charles-Alexandre Morel, Comte d'Aubigny; Count d'Aubigny (1699–1781)	-	(1780–1781)	Tenure at age 81 until 1781
Aymar Joseph de Roquefeuil et du Bousquet; Count of Roquefeuil and du Bousquet (1714–1782)		1781–1782	Tenure at age 67 until 1782
Henri-François de La Rochefoucauld (1716–1784)	-	1782–1784	Tenure at age 64 until 1784
Louis-Armand-Constantin de Rohan, Prince de Montbazon (1732–1794)		1784–1792	Tenure at age 52 until 1792

Although Tourville commanded the fleet during the battles of the reign of Louis XIV, his successors were too old to have likely served at sea. In practice, the squadrons at sea were under officers with the rank of Lieutenant général des Armées navales.

== Administration ==
The Fleet of the Levant was renamed the "Mediterranean Squadron" (escadre de la Méditerranée, fr:Escadre de la Méditerranée) after the French Revolution. The fleet was successively almost annihilated during the Siege of Toulon in 1793 and during the battles of the Nile in 1798 and Trafalgar in 1805.

The term "Fleet of the Levant" was temporary readopted after the French Restoration and the July Monarchy.
