= Antoine-Jean-Marie Thévenard =

French admiral (1733–1815)

Vice-amiral Antoine-Jean-Marie Thévenard
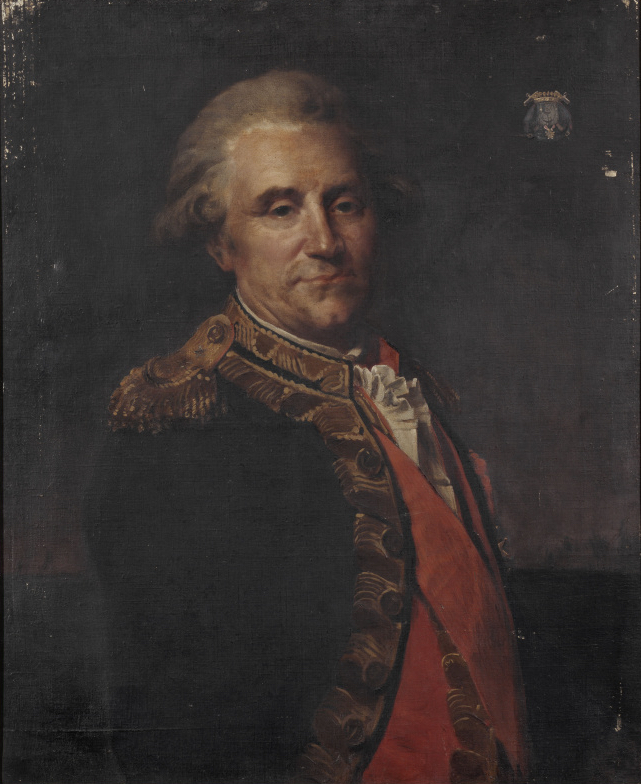

Minister of the Navy
- In office 17 May 1791 – 18 September 1791
- Monarch: Louis XVI
- Preceded by: Charles Pierre Claret de Fleurieu
- Succeeded by: Claude Antoine de Valdec de Lessart

Personal details
- Born: 7 December 1733 Saint-Malo, France
- Died: 9 February 1815 (aged 81) Paris, France
- Resting place: Panthéon, Paris
- Relations: Antoine René Thévenard (son)
- Awards: Count of the Empire; Grand Officer of the Legion of Honour; Commander of the Order of Saint Louis; Buried at the Panthéon

Military service
- Allegiance: Louis XVI; French First Republic; First French Empire
- Branch/service: French Navy
- Years of service: 1745–1816
- Rank: Vice-amiral

Antoine Jean Marie Thévenard, comte de Thévenard (French pronunciation: [ɑ̃twan ʒɑ̃ maʁi tevnaʁ]; 7 December 1733 – 9 February 1815) was a French politician and vice admiral. He served in the French ruling regimes of Louis XVI, those of the Revolution, Napoleon and Louis XVIII; he was made a count in 1810 and given a seat in the Senate, which he retained in the Chamber of Peers in 1814. He is buried at the Panthéon in Paris.

His son Capitaine de vaisseau Antoine René Thévenard was killed at the Battle of the Nile whilst commanding the 74-gun Aquilon. Thevenard Island off the coast of Western Australia bears his name.

== Career ==
Thévenard was born to Antoine Thévenard, a senior officer in the merchant navy, and Jeanne Moinet. He began sailing as a lieutenant in 1747 on merchantmen captained by his father, and went on to sail for the Compagnie des Indes.

Aged 12 he embarked on a Compagnie des Indes ship and fought in several battles. He became a lieutenant in 1754 and destroyed the English establishments on the Newfoundland coast and took part in François Thurot's expedition to Ireland in 1759. He earned the rank of Capitaine de vaisseau in the French Indies Company in 1764, and earned his first command of an East Indiaman in 1768.

Thévenard enlisted in the French Royal Navy in 1770, where his rank in the Compagnie des Indes earned him the rank of Commander. He was appointed Knight of the Order of Saint Louis and rose to captain in 1773, commanded the Lorient fleet from 1779, was promoted to Brigadeer of the naval armies in 1784, and eventually to Chef d'escadre in 1783. (Note: Arnault (p.426) says in 1784.)

In May 1791, Thévenard replaced Fleurieu as ministre de la Marine under Louis XVI, but resigned in September 1791, fallen out of favor because of his political opinions against the French Revolution.

Promoted Vice-admiral in 1793, he commanded the fleets at Brest, then Toulon, then Rochefort, and became Préfet maritime of Lorient then Toulon in 1801, where he remained until 1815.

In October 1799, Thévenard presided at the court-martial of Rear-Admiral Perrée, to examine the events of the action of 18 June 1799, in which he had lost his ships. He similarly presided at the court-martial following the capture of the Guillaume Tell in 1800, and the enquiry on the conduct of Rear-Admiral Dumanoir le Pelley at the Battle of Trafalgar. In 1809, he investigated the capitulation of Flessingen.

On 5 February 1810 he was made a comte d'Empire and member of the Sénat conservateur. In this capacity, he voted for the dismissal of Napoléon in 1814, which earned him an appointment to the Chambre des Pairs by Louis XVIII after the Bourbon Restoration in 1814. On 27 December 1814, he was promoted Commandeur in the Order of Saint-Louis.

Thévenard died on 9 February 1815 and was interred in the Panthéon in Paris.

== Memberships ==
- 1771: Member of the Académie de Marine
- 1787: Member of the Académie des Sciences

== Honours ==
- 1773: Knight of the Ordre de Saint-Louis. He was promoted to Commander on 27 December 1814, under the Bourbon Restoration.
- 1804: Grand officer of the Légion d'honneur
- buried in the Panthéon

=== Works ===
By Antoine-Jean-Marie Thévenard

- Rapports à l'Académie de Marine
- Services militaires des officiers de l'ancienne Compagnie des Indes
- Sur une École de marine à Lorient
- Sur le Commerce des Indes-Orientales
- Calculs pour tirer un vaisseau à terre
- Comparaison des courbes de fer à celles de bois
- Observations sur l'ordonnance de la marine du 27 Septembre 1776
- Projet de guerre contre les Anglais
- Mesurer avec précision la profondeur de la mer en sondant
- Nouvelle édition du Neptune oriental
- Sur l'établissement d'un port de secours à Pontrieux
- Expérience sur l'air dans les vaisseaux désarmés
- Essai sur les phares
- Observations météorologiques
- Sur le doublage en cuivre des vaisseaux, les toiles à voiles, la circulation du sang, la pêche à la sardine, la conservation des gens de mer, le commerce entre la France et les États-Unis
- Sur l'Île de la Trinité
- Sur l'enduit nommé galgale
- Sur le magnétisme animal
- Sur les Volcans, l'Artillerie, la Mécanique, la Lumière, le Nivellement de la Mer Rouge, la Résistance des Fluides, le Passage du raz de Sein ou de Fontenay

All the above were later re-printed in four volumes as Mémoires relatifs à la marine.

== Notes and references ==
=== Bibliography ===
- Arnault, Antoine-Vincent (1827). Biographie nouvelle des contemporains [1787-1820] (in French). Vol. 19. (San-Thou)
- Cunat, Charles (1857). Saint-Malo illustré par ses marins (in French). Imprimerie de F. Péalat.

External links

- Archives nationales (2011). "Fonds Marine, sous-série B/4: Campagnes, 1571-1785" (PDF).
- Académie de Marine. "THÉVENARD" (PDF).

Military offices
Preceded by Charles Pierre Claret de Fleurieu	Minister of the Navy and the Colonies; 17 May 1791 – 18 September 1791	Succeeded by Claude Antoine de Valdec de Lessart
