= Planned French invasion of Britain (1744) =

1744 cancelled French invasion of Britain

- Part of the War of the Austrian Succession
- c. 1740 map of the English Channel
Date	January – March 1744
Location	English Channel
Result	French failure

Belligerents
Great Britain; Dutch Republic	Jacobites; France

Commanders and leaders
George Wade; John Norris	Maurice de Saxe; Jacques Bousquest

Strength
7,000 regulars	6,000–15,000 regulars

Casualties and losses
Unknown	12 transports lost

An invasion of Great Britain was planned by France in 1744 shortly after the declaration of war between them as part of the War of the Austrian Succession. A large invasion force was prepared and put to sea from Dunkirk in February 1744, only to be partly wrecked and driven back into harbour by violent storms. Deciding that circumstances were not favourable to an invasion, the French government suspended the attempt, and deployed their forces elsewhere. The failure of the 1744 invasion attempt played a major role in the planning of the next French attempt to invade Britain, in 1759, which also proved unsuccessful.

== Background ==
Britain had been at war with France's ally Spain since 1739, but despite widespread expectations France had not entered the war on Spain's side. Sporadic fighting in the Americas had broken down into a stalemate. A separate war had broken out on continental Europe regarding the Austrian Succession in which Britain and Spain were also on opposite sides and in which France remained initially neutral. It was clear to many in both countries that war between them could not be far off, and the British had been particularly alarmed by extensive fortifications in the French port of Dunkirk.

British and French troops had already fought in Europe at battles such as Dettingen and the two countries were in a state of de facto war by late 1743. In January 1744 the French King Louis XV formally declared war on Britain. His Ministers were convinced that a strong, immediate strike was needed against Britain and began advocating an invasion of the British Isles. British financial subsidies were essential to keeping its continental allies Austria, Hanover and the Dutch Republic afloat. France believed that by invading Britain and knocking them out of the war, they could pave the way to an easy victory over their enemies to the east. Preparations for the invasion had been ongoing for some time before the declaration of war and Minister of the Marine Maurepas had detailed his trusted and highly competent First Commissioner Joseph Pellerin to prepare for it. Many flat-bottomed troop ships were built and provisioned in the northern ports under the Pellerin's direction. The King strongly approved this plan.

== Preparations ==
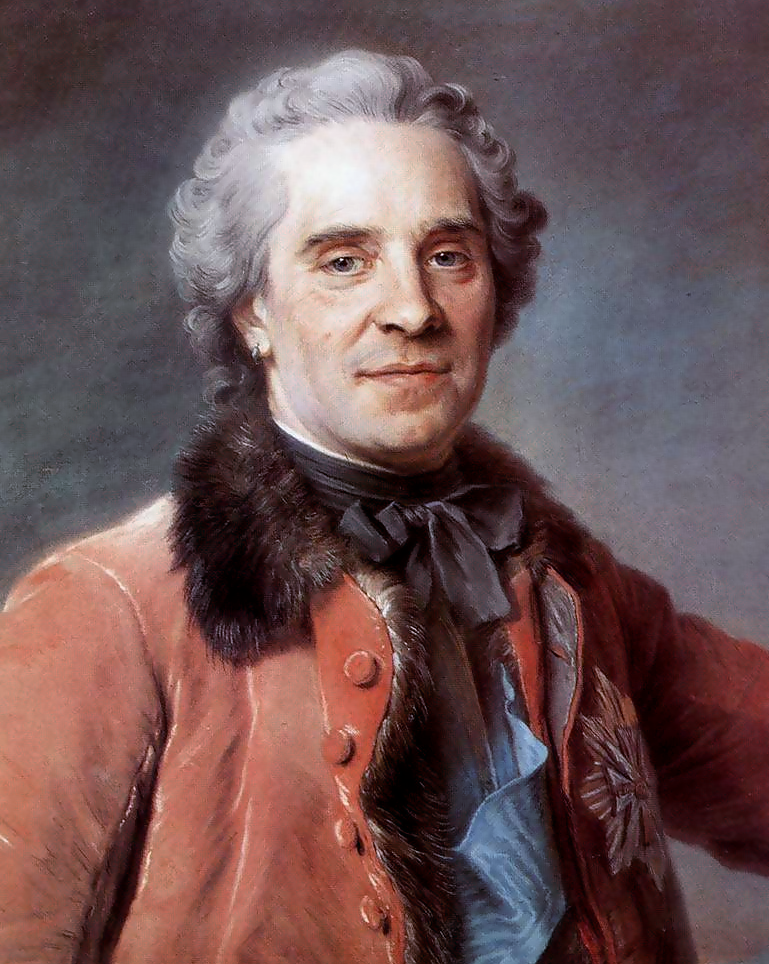
The experienced Maurice de Saxe was given command of French land forces for the invasion.

The French planned to install the Jacobite James Edward Stuart in London as James III. He would end Britain's involvement in the war, and would turn Britain into a client state of Louis XV's government. The Anglo-Austrian Alliance would be terminated, as would Britain's alliance with the Dutch. This would reverse Britain's past successful policy of forming Grand Alliances against France on the continent through military support and financial subsidies.

James, who was living in exile in a French palace in Paris, was made aware of these plans. It was hoped that Jacobite supporters in the British navy and army would assist the French. In some cases this proved wildly optimistic, as the officers listed as being committed Jacobites were often not or had already deceased. France now gathered a force estimated at somewhere between 6-15,000 in size at Dunkirk under the command of Marshal Saxe. Britain had been expecting a French invasion since as far back as 1740, when there had been an invasion scare, but the country was wary of the concept of standing armies and had limited regular forces to defend Great Britain.

The French planned for a landing at Maldon in Essex. A squadron under Roq would sail from Brest, checking that the Channel between Dunkirk and the English coast was clear of the British fleet. A message would then be sent to Saxe's invasion force at Dunkirk, informing them that the crossing was feasible. British agents in Rome and Paris got word of these preparations, and steps were taken to prepare. Of the 10,000 active troops in Britain, 7,000 were deployed to defend London and South East England. The Dutch Republic promised another 6,000 men in defence of Britain in early February. This act of Dutch support caused Robert Trevor, the British envoy in the Dutch Republic, to write that he did not believe that "His Majesty can have amongst his own natural subjects a million of persons more zealously and firmly attached to His Majesty's government and family, than the inhabitants of Holland". It would however take until 22 March for the Dutch to arrive, and by then the threat was already over.

== Invasion attempt ==
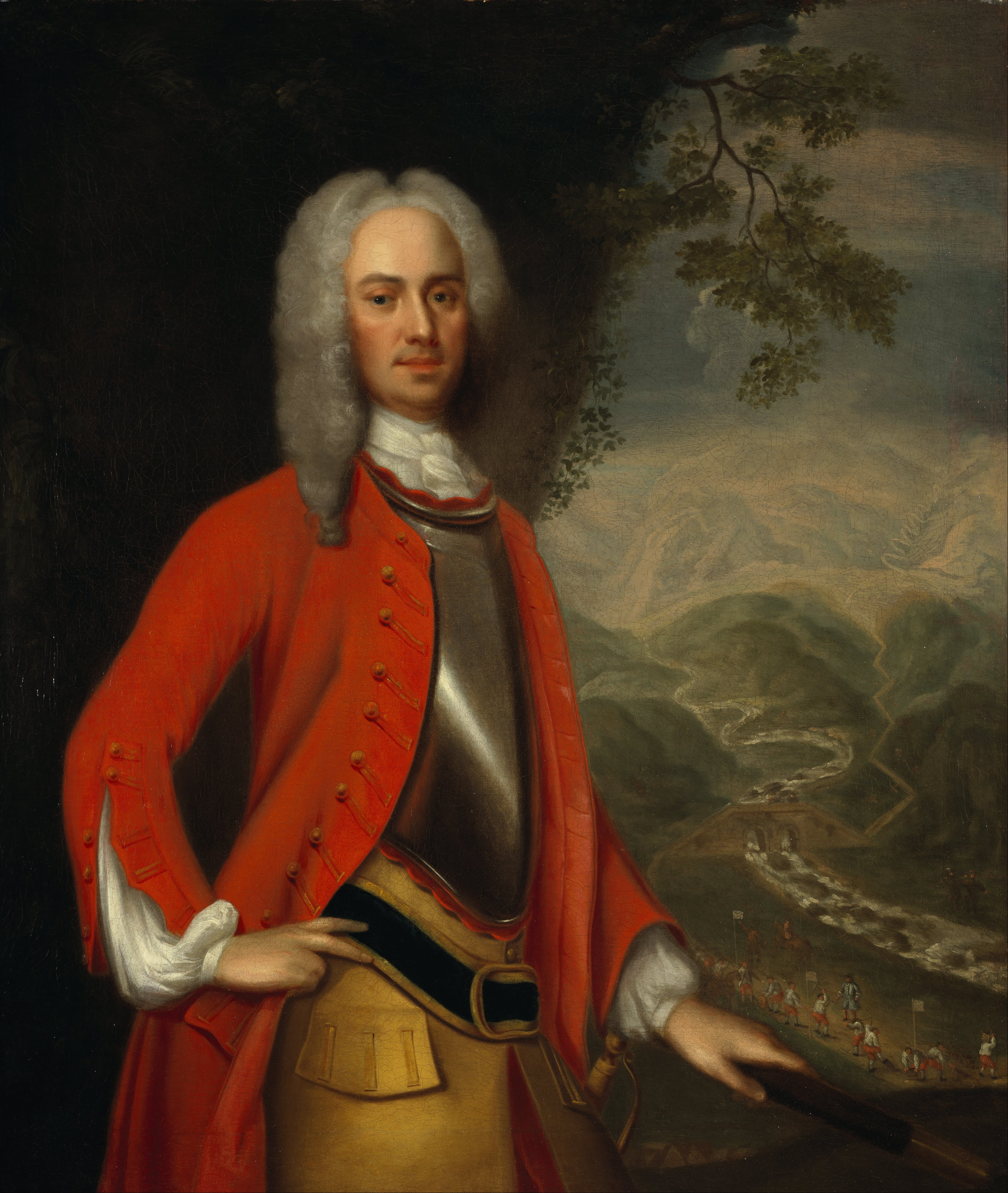
George Wade was to have commanded British troops resisting the invasion.

The covering squadron under Rocquefeuil sailed from Brest on 26 January. The French had made a mistake, believing that Norris's larger British fleet was in Portsmouth when it was in fact sitting off The Downs. When Rocquefeuil arrived off Dungeness on the 27 February he spotted Norris' fleet and hastily retreated. Norris pursued, but a violent storm suddenly descended – saving Rocquefeuil's squadron, which managed to avoid total destruction, although it was caught in the middle of the worst of the storm.

The main invasion fleet had sailed days before, made up mostly of transport ships. This expedition soon ran into a fierce storm. Twelve French transport ships were sunk, seven of which went down with all hands. The others were severely damaged and forced to limp back into Dunkirk. A week later the French fleet arrived in Brest severely battered by the storms. The British ships had been able to run swiftly into nearby harbours, and had escaped the storms' worst damages. The French government could not see any immediate prospect of a successful second attempt, and the troops were badly needed elsewhere.

Saxe's force were removed from the expedition, and instead marched into Flanders to fight the Dutch and Hanoverians. Many were happy to return to what they saw as a more conventional form of soldiering, after the terrors of their seaborne voyage.

== Aftermath ==
The following year a much smaller force was landed by France in northern Scotland to support the Jacobite rising which had broken out, led by Charles Edward Stuart. When Stuart reached Derby, France agreed to send a much larger invasion force to support them – but this decision was taken too late. By the time such an expedition was ready, Stuart had withdrawn to Scotland and the rebellion was ended with the Battle of Culloden in 1746 after which the French invasion plans were shelved for the remainder of the war.

In 1759 the Duc de Choiseul became captivated with the idea of a single strike to knock Britain out of the war. He revisited the plans for an invasion on the south coast of England with other landings across the British Isles. He became convinced that the 1744 invasion had failed, like the Spanish Armada, partly because of the complex attempt to combine both a large fleet of warships, with the invasion force carried in transports. His plan was to move an invasion force swiftly from Le Havre to Portsmouth, without fleet protection, and end the Seven Years' War. He rejected Dunkirk as the site of the invasion partly because of the experiences of 1744. Ultimately this attempt failed, as did further French planned invasions in 1779 and 1804.

== Bibliography ==
- Browning, Reed. The Duke of Newcastle. Yale University Press, 1975.
- Longmate, Norman. Island Fortress: The Defence of Great Britain, 1603–1945. Harper Collins, 1993
- McLynn, Frank. 1759: The Year Britain Became Master of the World. Pimlico, 2005.
- Rodger NAM. Command of the Ocean: A Naval History of Britain, 1649–1815. Penguin Books, 2006.
- Simms, Brendan. Three Victories and a Defeat: The Rise and Fall of the First British Empire. Penguin Books (2008)
- Jonathan Oates, DUTCH FORCES IN EIGHTEENTH-CENTURY BRITAIN: A BRITISH PERSPECTIVE, Journal of the Society for Army Historical Research, Vol. 85, No.341 (Spring 2007), pp. 20-39
