= Château de Gavaudun =

French castle

Coordinates: 44°33′37″N 0°53′18″E

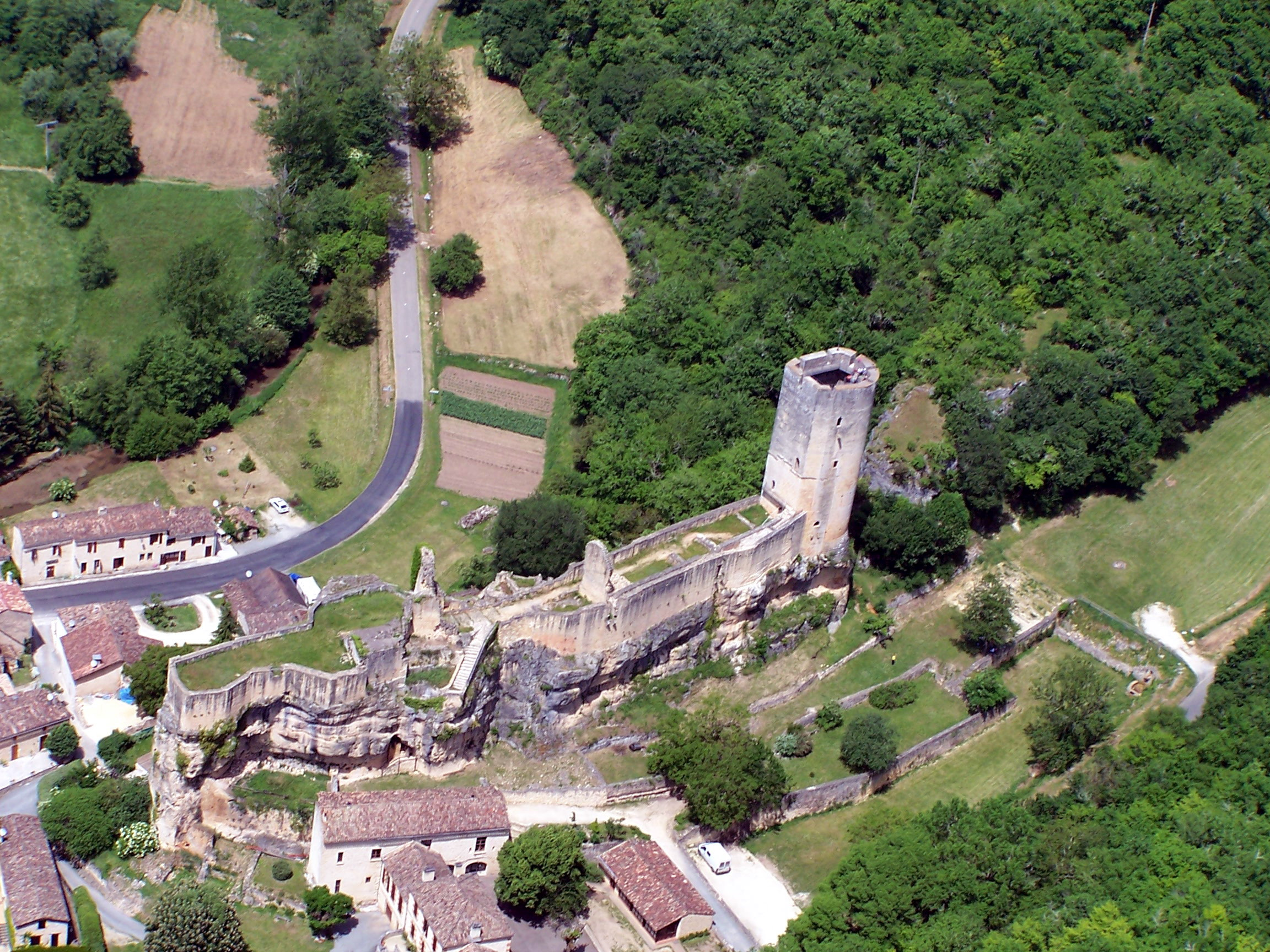
Château and village of Gavaudun

The Château de Gavaudun is a castle in the village of Gavaudun (Lot-et-Garonne, France) on the river Lède, near the Périgord noir region. It was built on a rocky spur and overhangs the river. The lofty 13th century keep rises 25m above the level of the rock.

In the vicinity are the Château de Bonaguil and the Château de Biron.

== History ==
The castle was built during the 12th and the 13th centuries, on the main road between Périgord and Agenais.

The bishop of Périgueux besieged it and destroyed it for the first time in 1165.

During the Hundred Years' War it was of central importance in the conflict between England and France.

The Château de Gavaudun has been listed by the French Ministry of Culture as a monument historique since 1862.

== See also ==
- List of castles in France
