= House of Roquefeuil-Blanquefort =

de Roquefeuil-Blanquefort Family
- Country: France
- Founded: 1393; 633 years ago
- Founder: Jean de Blanquefort
- Titles: Marquess du Bousquet
- Motto: Honour me resto, resto m'a basto!
- Cadet branches: Roquefeuil du Bousquet; Roquefeuil Montpeyroux; Roquefeuil Cahuzac

The House of Roquefeuil-Blanquefort is an old French noble family originating in the late 14th century through the union of the Roquefeuil and Blanquefort families. Proven filiation began in 1393 when Jean of Blanquefort married Catherine de Roquefeuil. Established in the region of Rouergue and Guyenne, the family gained prominence through military leadership, naval service, and regional governance. Notably, they are associated with the construction of the Château de Bonaguil, one of the last and largest medieval fortresses in France. Over the centuries, members of the family have held high-ranking positions such as vice-admirals of France, governors, and royal chamberlains, and their noble status was confirmed multiple times during the Ancien Régime. The Roquefeuil-Blanquefort family is a member of the Society of the Cincinnati.

== Origin ==
The House of Roquefeuil-Blanquefort originated in 1380 from the marriage of Jean de Blanquefort, lord of Blanquefort, and Catherine de Roquefeuil-Anduze, daughter and heiress of Arnaud IV de Roquefeuil-Anduze. Their son, Antoine de Roquefeuil, took his mother's surname, founding the Roquefeuil-Blanquefort branch, which combined the heritage and titles of both families.

According to genealogist Aubert de La Chesnaye-Desbois, Jean de Blanquefort may have descended from a younger son of the Roquefeuil family who acquired the lordship of Blanquefort; however, this remains unproven due to the existence of several lordships named Blanquefort in the Guyenne region. Louis de La Roque noted in 1879 that the multiplicity of lordships called Blanquefort complicates precise determination of the family's origins^{,}.

== History ==
The eldest branch of the family is notably associated with Bérenger, lord of Roquefeuil and Blanquefort, who initiated the construction of the Château de Bonaguil in the late 15th century. The castle, completed after more than forty years of construction, is considered the last and largest medieval fortress built in France. It exemplifies the military architecture of the time and symbolizes the power and influence of the family in the region^{,}.

A cadet branch was founded by Antoine de Roquefeuil, brother of Jean II de Roquefeuil. This branch took the surname of Roquefeuil-Padies and later Roquefeuil du Bousquet or Roquefeuil-Montpeyroux and distinguished itself in naval service. Prominent members include Jacques Aymar de Roquefeuil, hereditary governor of Rodez and lieutenant general of the French Navy, and Aymar Joseph de Roquefeuil, governor of Brest and vice-admiral of France commanding the Levant Fleet^{,}.

The Cahuzac branch produced Camille de Roquefeuil, a naval officer and governor of Réunion Island, credited with completing the first circumnavigation of the globe after the French Revolution.

== Branches ==
Eldest branch (extinct):

- Antoine I de Roquefeuil, son of Jean de Blanquefort and Catherine de Roquefeui married Delphine d'Arpajon, he inherited of the baronies of Roquefeuil and Blanquefort.
  - Jean II de Roquefeuil and his brother Antoine (author of the Padiès branch) took part in the League of the Public Weal but received Louis XI's pardon in February 1478.
    - Bérenger de Roquefeuil (1448–1530) built Bonaguil, the last and largest castle erected in France. Its construction took place in Saint-Front-sur-Lémance and lasted over 40 years. Bérenger married Anne de Tournel.
      - Charles de Roquefeuil married Blanche of Montpezat sister of Antoine, Marechal of France
        - Antoine II married Claude de Peyre in 1555.
          - Antoine III de Roquefeuil became knight of the Order of Saint Michael in 1570 and the barony of Roquefeuil was erected as marquisate in 1618
            - Antoine-Alexandre de Roquefeuil died without male descendance.

Branches of Padiès, Bousquet and Montpeyroux:

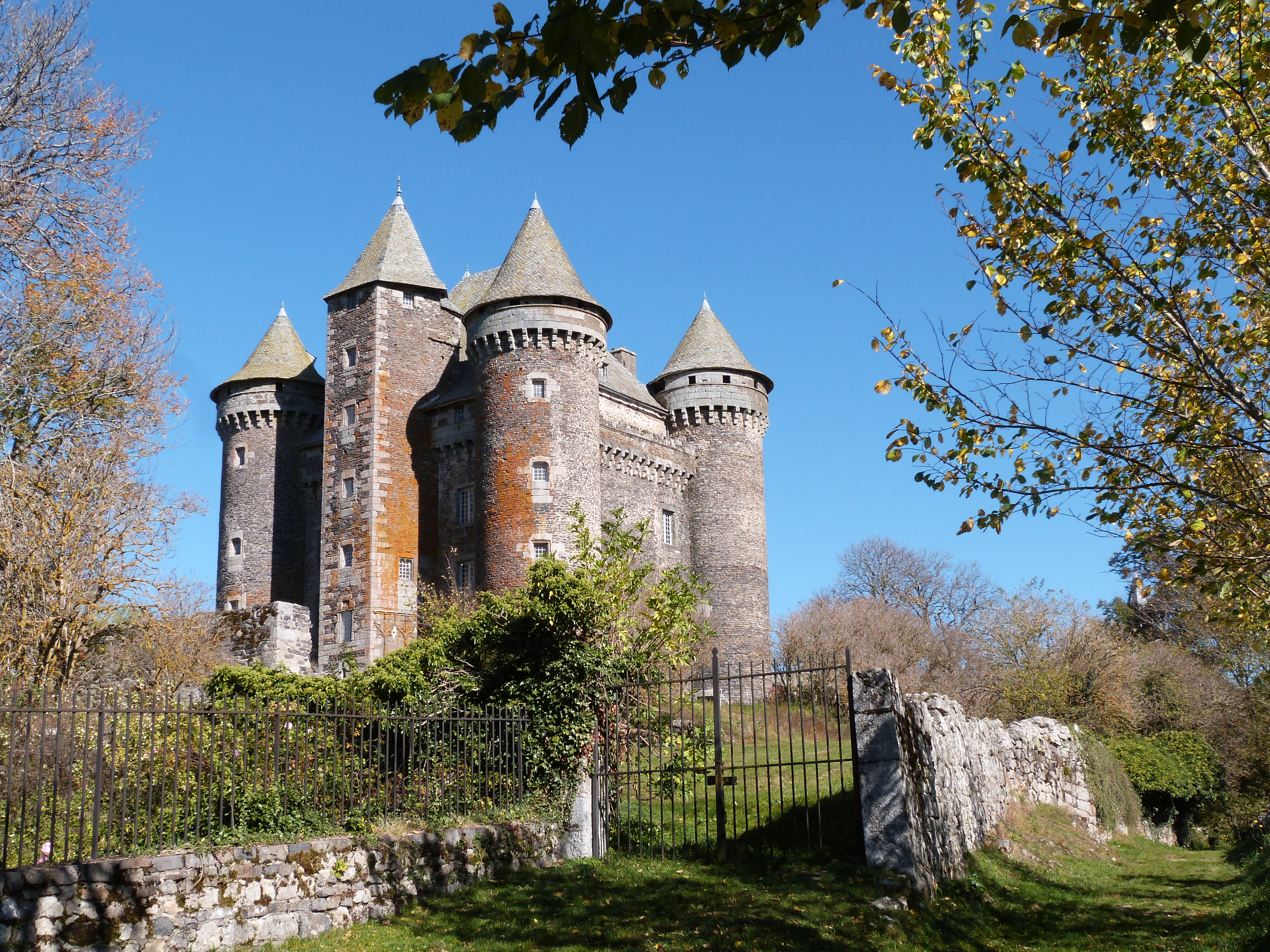
Castle du Bousquet

This cadet branch was created by Antoine de Roquefeuil, brother of Jean II de Roquefeuil and became the main branch after Antoine-Alexandre de Roquefeuil's death. Settled in Montpeyroux the branch owned the castle du Bousquet and included several officers and sailors.

- Jacques Aymar de Roquefeuil was hereditary governor of Rodez and lieutenant general of the French Navy
  - Aymar Joseph de Roquefeuil was governor of Brest, and later vice-Admiral of France in charge of the Levant Fleet
    - Innocent de Roquefeuil was colonel of the Roquefeuil regiment and took part in the Armée des émigrés
  - René et du Bousquet, chef d'escadre

Pierre de Roquefeuil-Montpeyroux took part in the American Revolutionary War through the battle of Ushant and the battle of the Saintes. He was member of the Society of the Cincinnati with two of his cousins.

Branch of Cahuzac :

- Camille of Roquefeuil was a navy officer and a marine governor in the Reunion island. He retired from navy to accomplish the first world circumnavigation after the French Revolution.

Ancestry from Roquefeuil to the Rockefeller family are suggested, via Goddard Rockenfeller (born 1590)

== Titles and honors ==
The family was granted the title of Marquis in 1618.

During the Ancien Régime, family members held prestigious positions such as

- Chamberlain to King Charles VI,
- Seneschal of Périgord,
- Captain of the Comtat Venaissin,
- Director of the French Naval Academy,

Also, they also achieved military ranks including:

- Vice-Admiral of France,
- Lieutenant General of the Naval Armies,
- Maréchal de camp,
- Commodore,
- Captains and colonels...

The noble status of the Roquefeuil-Blanquefort family was officially confirmed multiple times: in Languedoc in 1701, in Guyenne in 1704, and again in Guyenne in 1786. These confirmations were based on documentation proving noble lineage dating back to the early 15th century.

== See also ==
- House of Roquefeuil-Anduze
- Bonaguil
- Society of the Cincinnati

== Bibliography ==
- Grand Armorial de France Supplément (PDF) (in French). Vol. 6. Paris: Société du Grand Armorial de France. 1948. p. 58 : de Roquefeuille-Blanquefort genealogy.
