= Château de Bonaguil =

Castle in Nouvelle-Aquitaine, France

Coordinates: 44°32′18″N 1°00′51″E

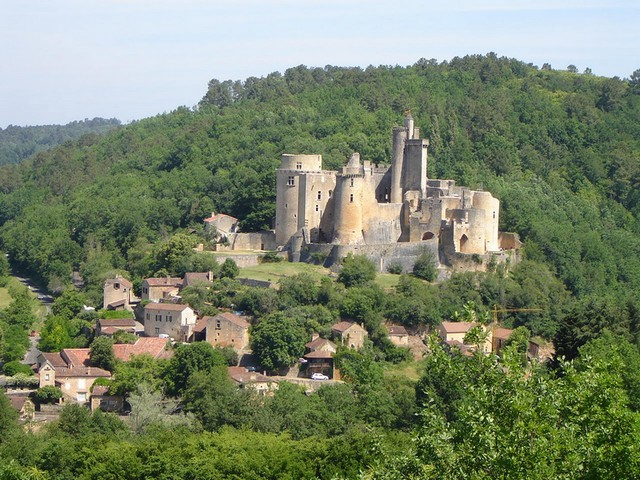
A view of the Château de Bonaguil

The Château de Bonaguil (French pronunciation: [ʃato d(ə) bɔnaɡil]; "Castle of Bonaguil"; Occitan: Castèl de Bonaguil) is a castle in the French commune of Saint-Front-sur-Lémance, Lot-et-Garonne, owned by the neighbouring commune of Fumel. It has been classified a monument historique (historic monument) since 1862.

It was built in the 13th century, but was entirely restructured at the end of the 15th and beginning of the 16th centuries by Bérenger de Roquefeuil, who added all of the defensive improvements of the end of the Middle Ages. A marvel of military architecture covering 7,500 m^{2}, incorporating the latest developments in artillery (both for defence and in adapting the defences for protection against it), it was, however, obsolete when completed. It was never attacked.

The name derives from bonne aiguille (good needle) and refers to the defensive site: a steep, rocky promontory perfectly suited to the siting of a castle.

== First stage ==
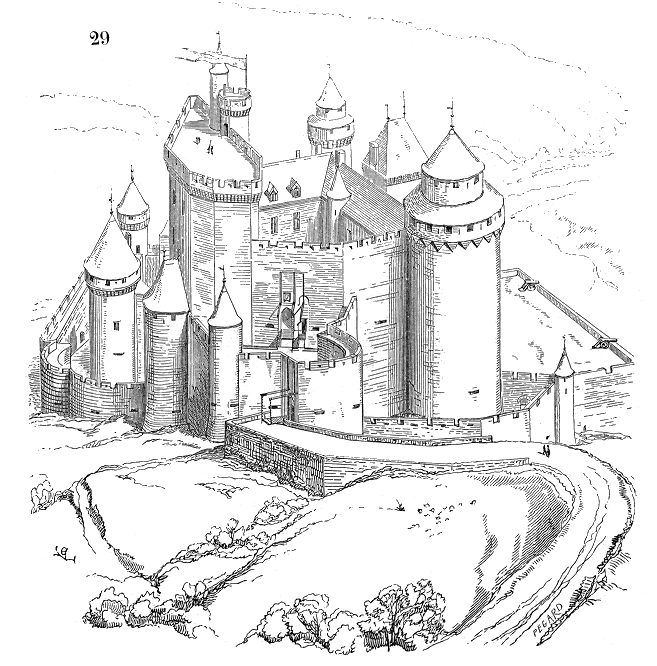
The Château de Bonaguil drawn by Viollet-le-Duc

The first castle at Bonaguil was constructed after the middle of the 13th century (between 1259 and 1271 according to Jacques Gardelle), on a rocky spur, probably by Arnaud La Tour de Fumel. The single entrance to the keep, built above a natural cave, was a door six metres up, accessible by ladder.

The first written mention is in 1271, in a charter listing the possessions of the King of France Philippe III le Hardi. At that date, it was a vassal of the fiefdom of Tournon, and was probably just a simple polygonal keep, with a small courtyard surrounded by a wall, with a lower courtyard surrounded by a palisade. The dwelling was not built until the end of the 13th century or even the beginning of the 14th.

The widening of a fracture in the rock allowed a well to be dug to a depth of 47 m (154 ft).

The lords of Bonaguil fought on the side of the King of England in the Hundred Years War. The castle was taken several times, burnt and abandoned, although always the property of the Fumel family.

On 11 November 1380, Jean de Fumel-Pujols, baron of Blanquefort and owner of the castle, married the heiress of Roquefeuil, Jeanne Catherine de Roquefeuil, and dropped his name for the more prestigious name of his wife. Their son Antoine joined the properties of the two families, and their grandson, Jean de Roquefeuil, moved with his wife Isabeau de Peyre to Bonaguil in 1444.

== Developments by Jean de Roquefeuil ==
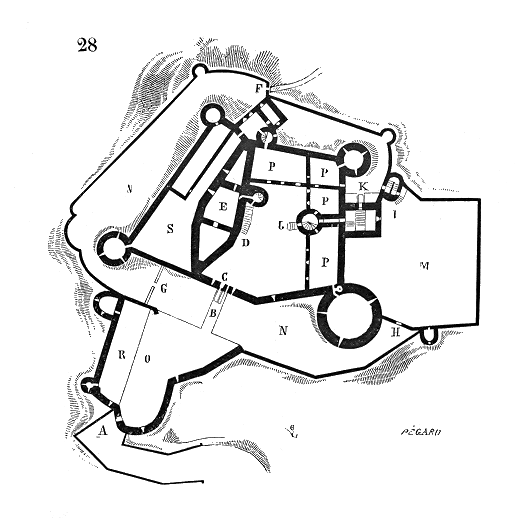
A plan of the Château de Bonaguil by Viollet-le-Duc

Jean de Roquefeuil, who sent his son Antoine to take part in the War of the League of the Public Weal, against the King, made several modifications, as much for defence as comfort:

- the walls of the dwelling were raised (E on the plan) and reached the height of the keep (which thus acquired a more massive silhouette)
- from 1470 to 1482, the keep was rebuilt, with an overall streamlined shape, in order to better resist artillery
- a spiral staircase was installed in a new turret, in the west, increasing the available space
- a new dwelling was built to the east of the keep: its length currently stands on the east-south-east against the curtain wall and its openings are orientated to the north-north-east and west-north-west
- a ramp was built to provide easier access to the keep.

Of Jean's four sons, out of nine children, it was the third, Bérenger, who survived and inherited the property of his father.

== Defensive reinforcement by Bérenger de Roquefeuil ==
The considerable defence works of the castle have their origin in the lord of Bonaguil's problems with King Charles VII, who condemned him for his violence against serfs and vassals. They were financed thanks to the good fortune of the Roquefeuils, who owned lands in the Gironde and the Golfe du Lion. The works extended over thirty years.

=== First wall ===
The main danger at the end of the 15th century came from artillery. For protection, it was necessary to keep the enemy's cannons at a distance. An external wall, 350 m in length, was added to the castle, with lower curtains retaining a mass of earth which cushioned the artillery shots. This curtain wall was reinforced with small towers and equipped with guns. This was the second innovation of this rebuilding: provision for the use of masses of artillery for the defence of the castle, with a total of 104 embrasures for firing.

So the castle used the latest developments in armaments: push back the firing of the assailants by obliging them to set up their cannons further away; make the approach difficult with openings for ground shot; large calibre guns were put on top of the towers (such as the platform on top of the keep) so as to fight at a distance.

The spur on which the castle stands is cut by a large ditch sunk in the rock. A barbican was built beyond the ditch. It was linked by two drawbridges to the body of the castle. It was also defended by several guard towers, allowing a flanking fire from which the arquebuses could cover every angle.

Still with the aim of leaving no point uncovered by fire, caponiers were built in the ditches; these small earthworks were in front of the curtain, allowing the ditch to be swept with fire from the defenders, from one or both sides of the structure.

Finally, boulevards were laid out, partly in the north ditch, to permit rapid movement from one point to another of the fortress, in case of attacks on different parts of the castle; this anticipated the fortresses of the 17th century.

=== Second system of defence ===
The earthworks and barbican were only designed to postpone the danger to the heart of the castle, the residential part. This was equally strengthened. Six towers were built – four round towers in the corners, and two towers in the middles of the curtain, a square on in the west and a round tower in the south. The towers allowed greater cover of the curtains: defenders could fire on the sides of assailants who were attacking at the foot of the wall between two towers.

These high towers served, as in the mediaeval castles, to protect the walls thanks to their design. Their height was a guarantee against scaling. The innovation was the treatment of the top, reinforced to provide an artillery platform. The corbels supporting the walkway were replaced with inverted pyramids, much more solid and able to support a much heavier weight – an artillery piece, its carriage and supplies.

== Changing fortunes of the castle from the 16th to the 18th century ==
When Bérenger died in 1530, the castle was not yet adapted for siege warfare, but it remained an imposing fortress.

His son Charles squandered his fortune (on his beautiful wife Blanche de Lettes de Montpezat, it seems) and his sons Honrat and Antoine inherited a reduced fortune. During the Wars of Religion, the two brothers fought in opposite camps, and the castle was taken in 1563. A first restoration took place in 1572. In debt, Antoine had to give the fortress to the lord of Pardhaillan in 1618, before being able to buy it back several years later.

His son Antoine-Alexandre was a marquis, but passed on to his only daughter Marie-Gilberte a castle in a poor state and empty coffers. Married from the death of her father (8 July 1639) to the Marquis of Coligny-Saligny, she devoted herself to the repair and maintenance of the castle. She remarried in 1655 to Claude-Yves de Tourzel, Marquis of Allègre, with whom she had a daughter who married Seignelay, minister of the Colbert family.

François de Roquefeuil, a distant relative with some claim to the castle, took possession of it in 1656, kept and pillaged it for almost a year before abandoning it. Marie-Gilberte lived in Paris for the last years of her life, and abandoned the château de Bonaguil, until her death in 1699. It passed next to François-Gaspard de Montpeyroux, a soldier who almost never lived there, then to his sister, who sold it in 1719 to Jean-Antoine de Pechpeyrou-Beaucaire. His son sold the castle to Marguerite de Fumel, widow of Emmanuel de Giversac, in 1761, who carried out some works to make it more comfortable.

== Embellishments of the 18th century ==
Marguerite de Fumel stayed regularly at the Château de Bonaguil. She converted the castle, notably in the dwelling P in the plan. In this period, the earthworks to the west of the castle were enlarged and laid out as a large terrace and became a pleasant promenade. New apartments were built in the south, outside the inner wall, thus benefitting from a better outlook. The lady of the manor gave feasts. The seven drawbridges became fixed bridges. A part of the ramparts was demolished to give a view over the valley.

== The French Revolution and restorations ==
It was the nephew of Marguerite de Fumel, Joseph-Louis de Fumel, who inherited in 1788. He fled in October 1789, and the castle was declared bien national (national property). The furniture was dispersed, the roofs, floors and wood panelling taken down. Following the Thermidor, the Fumels recovered the castle, but did not live there, and sold it.

It passed from owner to owner until it was purchased in 1860 by the commune of Fumel, who obtained the classification Monument historique (1862) and began some restoration work by B Cavailler in 1868 and by the arrondissement's architect A Gilles in 1876. The architect from the Monument historique restored the keep between 1882 and 1886. Other repairs were made between 1898 and 1900, including covering the watch tower roof with stone tiles in 1900. Further restoration works were carried out in 1948–1950, 1977 and 1985.

== See also ==
- List of castles in France
