= Charles Pierre Claret de Fleurieu =

French Navy officer, explorer, hydrographer and politician

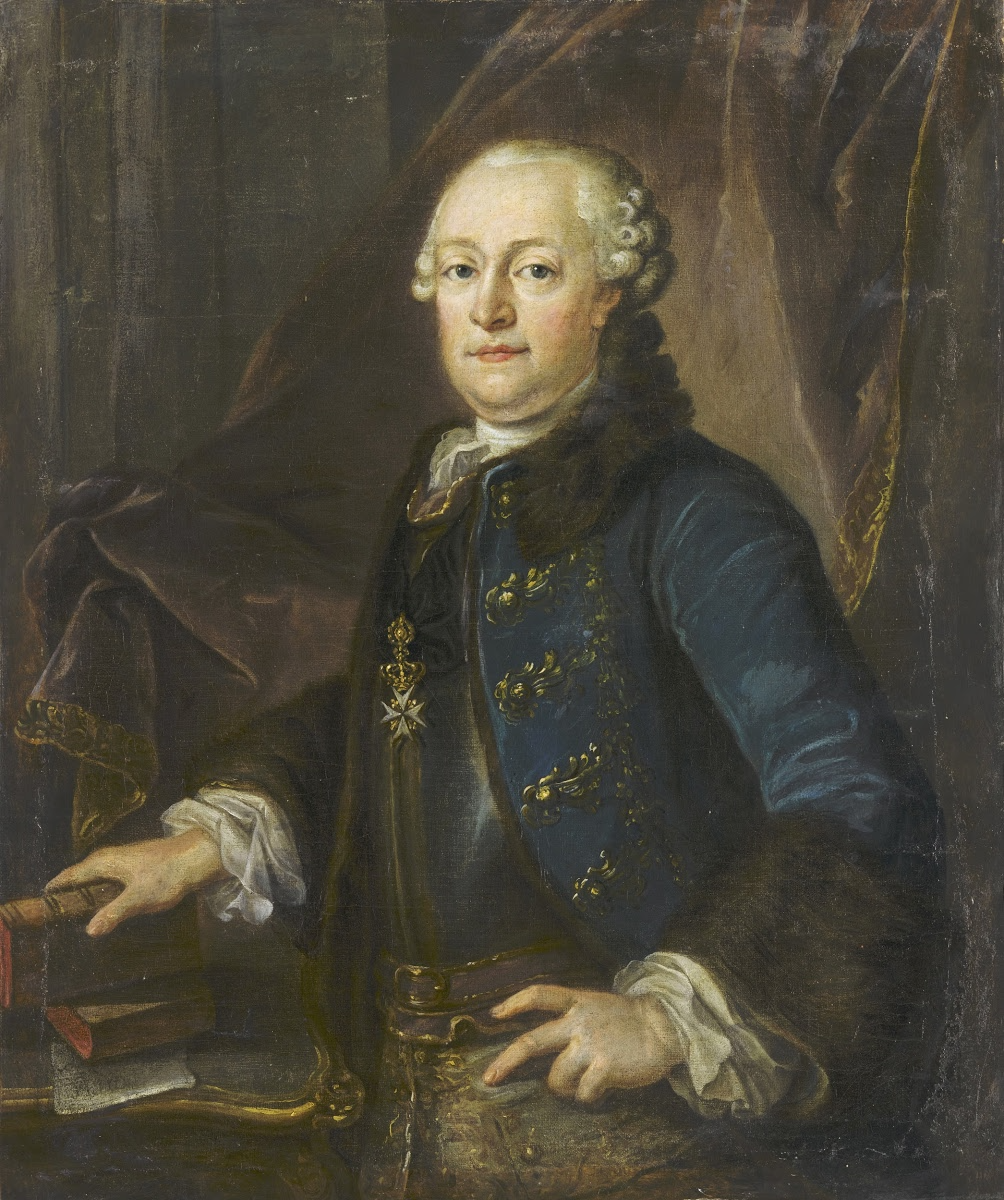
- Born: Charles Pierre Claret; 2 July 1738; 2nd arrondissement of Lyon
- Died: 18 August 1810 former 2nd arrondissement of Paris
- Resting place: Panthéon
- Occupations: Cartographer, naval officer
- Spouse: Aglaé Baconnière de Salverte
- Father: Jacques Annibal Claret de La Tourrette
- Relatives: Marc Antoine Louis Claret de La Tourrette
- Awards: Grand Officer of the Legion of Honour (1804); Knight of the Royal and Military Order of Saint Louis (1775)

Charles Pierre Claret, comte de Fleurieu (/ˈflɜːriɜː/ FLUH-ree-uhh; French pronunciation: [ʃaʁl pjɛʁ klaʁɛ kɔ̃t də flœʁjø]) (2 July 1738 – 18 August 1810) was a French Navy officer, explorer, hydrographer and politician. He served as Minister of the Navy under Louis XVI, and was a member of the Institut de France. His brother was botanist Marc Antoine Louis Claret de La Tourrette.

== Life ==
=== Ancien Regime ===
Fleurieu was born in Lyon. He joined the Navy on 31 October 1755 at Toulon as a Garde-marine, aged just 13 and a half. He subsequently took part in the campaigns of the Seven Years' War — which ended in 1763 — participating in the battles of Mahon, Lagos, and Les Sablettes and rising to brigadier in the gardes de la marine company, and then enseigne de vaisseau. In suggesting de Fleurieu's promotion to ensign, on 23 March 1762, the Minister wrote to the king:

he combines the wisest of conducts and greatest of dedications with extraordinary knowledge and the most favourable disposition to become a distinguished officer. His commanding officers hold him in the highest regard, and have put him forwards as a candidate for promotion, as to benefit the service and be an example to others.

On 1 July 1765, he was made Enseigne de port, and on 27 July he went to Paris to study horology with Ferdinand Berthoud. He took part in a one-year sea campaign to test Berthoud's first marine chronometer, in an attempt to beat Britain in the race to find a reliable way to calculate longitude. The chronometers he thus refined with Ferdinand Berthoud for their later experiments were the object of major struggles with the king's horologer, Pierre Le Roy. Finally Claret de Fleurieu and Berthoud were entrusted with the task, setting out on the testing expedition from autumn 1768 to 11 October 1769 on the corvette Isis under Fleurieu's command.

The chronometers almost invariably indicated the hour as accurately after the ship had left port, as if they were still on land. Knowing the actual local time at each present location by astronomy, they could easily determine the ship's exact position and longitude on a chart. The results of their observations was published in 1773 under the title Voyage fait par ordre du roi, pour éprouver les horloges marines ("Voyage made by order of the king, to test marine chronometers"). We can also cite among his major works le Neptune du Nord or l'Atlas du Cattegat et de la Baltique, an atlas of the Kattegat and the Baltic Sea that took him 25 years.

Made lieutenant de vaisseau on 1 October 1773, then deputy inspector of naval charts and plans, he also became deputy inspector of the naval academy on 15 May 1776. He was presented to the king and named capitaine de vaisseau on 5 December 1776 and soon afterwards director of ports and arsenals in January 1777, a post heading the fleet's organization of matériel, works and movements created specially for him by Louis XVI and one he held for 15 years. In it he directed nearly all planning for naval operations against the British as part of the American Revolutionary War, as well as all the French voyages of discovery such as that of La Pérouse.

=== French Revolution ===
The king made him Ministre de la Marine et des Colonies on 26 October 1790. He and the king wanted to separate the naval and colonial ministries, but the Assemblée nationale thought otherwise, and he resigned on 15 April 1791. Later that year he was made guardian of the Dauphin, later Louis XVII. He remained in the Tuileries on 10 August 1792, in support of Louis XVI right up until the critical point, but fortunately for him the revolutionaries did not discover this. In the midst of the Reign of Terror, in September 1793, Charles Pierre was arrested due to a letter of recommendation Louis XVI had sent to the Assemblée nationale, published in the Universal Monitor on 17 April 1791, in which he first demanded Charles' nomination as the Dauphin's governor.

He remained imprisoned with his wife in the Madelonnettes for 14 months; they were finally released to find their homes, furniture, lands and resources dispersed and destroyed. A letter to the section des piques in the prison, discovered in the house of Maximilien Robespierre, speaks of a first arrest, which may suggest Charles was arrested several times and transferred from prison to prison. After the fall of Robespierre he was made a member of the Bureau des longitudes and of the Institut after M. de Bougainville's resignation in 1795. In 1797 (year V) he was elected deputy for the Seine in the Council of Ancients under the name Claret-Fleurieu. He remained so until the coup d'état of 18 Fructidor when he was excluded from the council. He was elected a member of the Conseil d'État on 24 December 1799.

=== First French Empire ===
On 30 September 1800, as Minister Plenipotentiary, he signed a treaty of friendship and commerce between France and the United States at Morfontaine, alongside Joseph Bonaparte. A member of the Council of State in 1800, he presided over its naval section and was interim Minister of the Navy several times during 1803 and 1804. He was named Quartermaster General of the emperor Napoleon's household and of the Imperial civil list on 10 July 1804.

On 24 July 1805, he was elected a member of the Sénat conservateur and made a Grand Officer of the Legion of Honor. On 1 August 1805, he was made Governor of the Tuileries and the Louvre, taking the oath before the Emperor on 8 September that year. On 2 February 1806, he was elected one of the seven senators who composed the Council of Administration within the Senate for that year. In 1808 he was made Councilor of State for life and an Imperial Count. On 7 September of that same year, Napoleon put him in charge of the investigation into the French defeat at the Battle of Trafalgar.

== Death ==
He died in Paris from a devastating cerebral hemorrhage, a few seconds after embracing his two daughters. Napoleon rewarded his services by giving him a state funeral and having his remains transferred to the Panthéon.

== Marriage and issue ==
At age 54, he married Aglaé-Françoise Deslacs d'Arcambal; they had one son who died young and two daughters, including Caroline (Madame de Saint-Ouen, from whom his descendants trace their lineage).

== Works ==
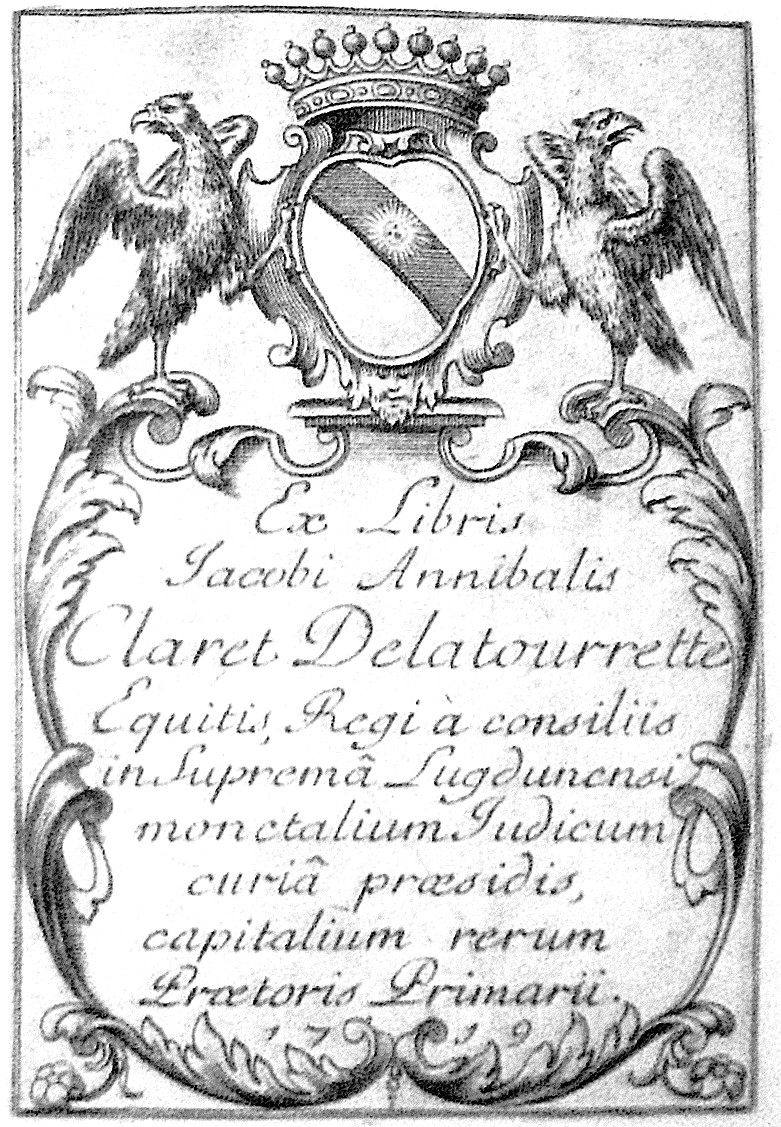
Arms of the Fleurieu family and ex-libris

- Mémoires sur la construction des navires, 1763;
- Histoire générale des navigations de tous les peuples;
- Examen critique d'un mémoire publié par Mr Leroy, horloger du roi, sur l'épreuve des horloges propres à déterminer les longitudes en mer, et sur les principes de leur construction, London and Paris.
- Voyage entrepris en 1768 et 1769 pour éprouver les horloges marines (2 vols., Paris, 1773);
- Une carte du grand Océan Atlantique, 1776;
- Découvertes des Français en 1768 et 1769 dans le sud-est de la Nouvelle-Guinée, et reconnaissance postérieure des mêmes terres par des navigateurs anglais qui leur ont imposé de nouveaux noms ; précédées de l'abrégé historique des navigations et des découvertes des Espagnols dans les mêmes parages, Paris, 1790, with 12 maps
- Longitude exacte des divers points des Antilles, et de l'Amérique du Nord (1773);
- Les Antilles, leur flore et faune (1774);
- Le Neptune Américo-septentrional, 1780;
- Découvertes des Français dans le Sud Est de la Nouvelle-Guinée en 1768 et 1769, Paris, 1790;
- Précis de l'affaire relative à la dénonciation de Fleurieu, ministre de la marine, par un commis de la marine, Paris, 1791.
- Voyage autour du monde par Étienne Marchand, précédé d'une introduction historique; auquel on a joint des recherches sur les terres australes de Drake, et un examen critique de voyage de Roggeween, avec cartes et figures, Paris, years VI-VIII, 4 vol.
  - Vol I (Archive.org)
  - Vol II (Archive.org)
  - Vol III (Archive.org)
  - Vol IV (Archive.org)
- Le Neptune des mers du Nord, 1794.
- Histoire des aventuriers espagnols, qui conquérirent l'Amérique (1800).
- Sous sa direction, rédaction par Rigobert Bonne du Neptune américo-septentrional, 1778-1780, et par Buache du Neptune du Cattégat et de la Baltique, 65 f., 1809
- He also revised Jean Nicolas Demeunier's 1775 translation of Voyage de Phipps au pôle boréal, and edited the Notes géographiques et historiques printed with accounts of La Pérouse's voyage.
- He died before finishing his Histoire générale des Navigations.

He also edited the Voyage autour du monde which was written in 1790 and 1792 by Étienne Marchand, year VI (1798).

== Namesakes ==
- the Fleurieu Peninsula to the south of Adelaide in Australia was named after him by the French explorer Nicolas Baudin as he mapped the south coast of Australia in 1802.
- an island (discovered in 1798 by Matthew Flinders, then explored by Louis Claude de Saulces de Freycinet) at the northwest extremity of Tasmania was also named after him.

== Sources ==
- "M. le Comte de Fleurieu" by M. Frédéric Chassériau
- Archives nationales, 2 JJ 92 à 103. – Fastes de la Légion d'Honneur.
- Delambre, Notice sur la vie et les ouvrages de M. le comte de Fleurieu. –
- Discours sur Fleurieu par Raillon, 1810.
- Notice sur Fleurieu par Salverte, s. d. et par. Chassériau, 1856.
- Archives biographiques françaises, I, 403, p. 354-377
- Bulletin des voyages, de la géographie et de l'histoire, N° XXXVI, p. 373, by Eusèbe Salverte --
- Annales des voyages, de la géographie et de l'histoire, vol. 4 of the 3rd subscription, and 12th of the collection. Article from the bulletin signé Eusèbe Salverte.
- Annales maritimes coloniales, p. 85-102, by the Chevalier Delambre. Recueilli par M. Bajot.
- Journal de l'armée navale, journal "le moniteur", Archives nationale de la marine.
- Biographie nouvelle des contemporains [1787-1820] de Antoine-Vincent Arnault page 170–171
- Dernières années du règne et de la vie de Louis XVI, de François Hue, René Du Ménil de Maricourt, Henri de L'Epinois (p. 328-329)
- La vie et les mémoires du général Dumouriez, de Charles François Du Périer Dumouriez, p. 175-177.
- Mémoires secrets pour servir à l'histoire de la dernière année du règne de Louis XVI, d'Antoine François Bertrand de Moleville
- Nouvelle biographie générale depuis les temps les plus reculés à nos jours, par P. Levot
- Mémoires inédits de madame la comtesse de Genlis pour servir à l'histoire des XVIIIème et XIXème siècles.

Military offices
Preceded by César Henri, comte de La Luzerne	Minister of the Fleet and the Colonies; 26 October 1790-17 May 1791	Succeeded by Antoine-Jean-Marie Thévenard
