= Roquefeuil, Aude =

Commune in Occitanie, France

Roquefeuil
- Commune
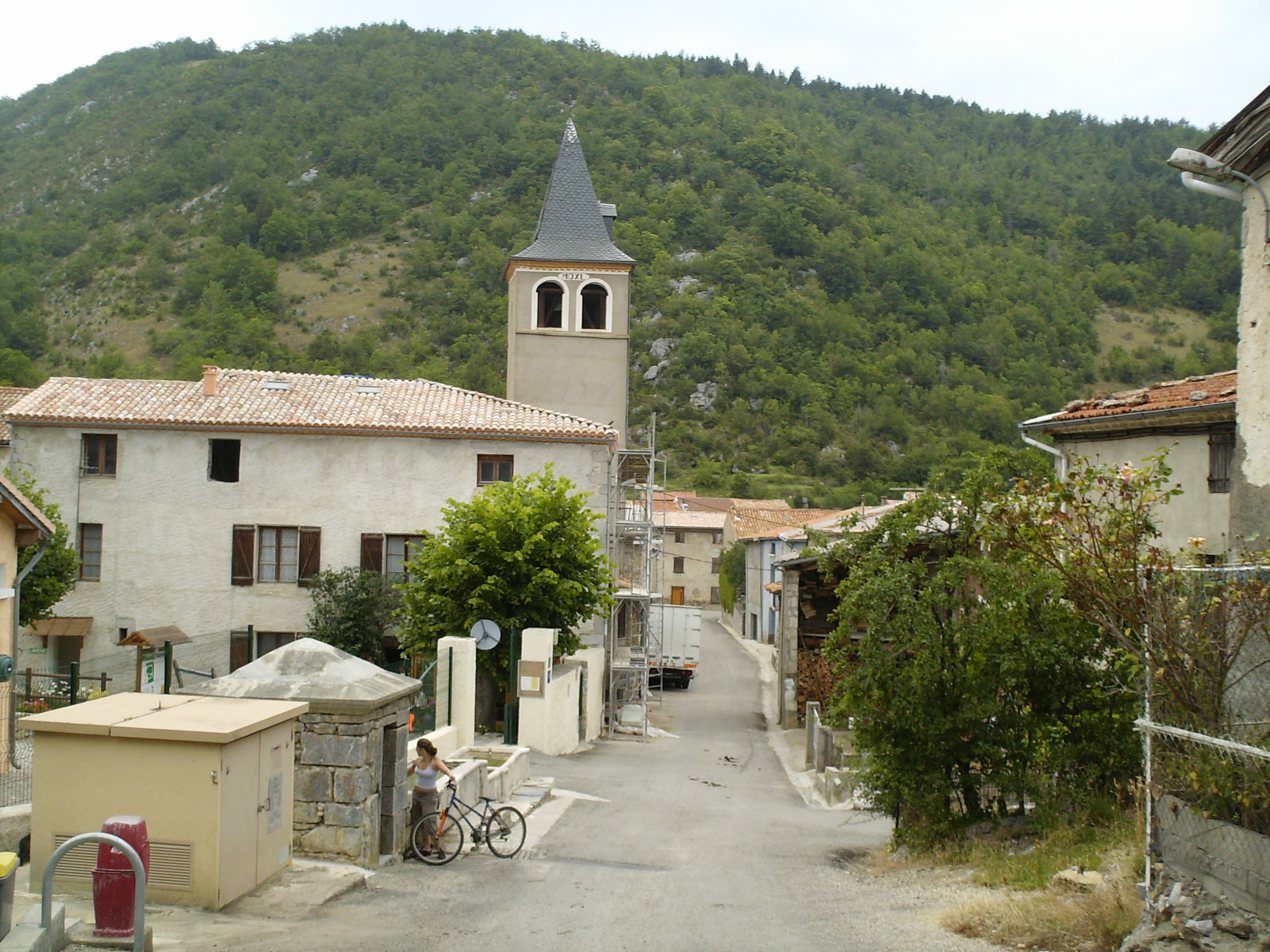
- The Church of Saint-Étienne and surroundings in Roquefeuil

- Coat of arms
- Location of Roquefeuil
- Location within France Location within Occitanie
- Coordinates: 42°49′16″N 1°59′45″E
- Country: France
- Region: Occitania
- Department: Aude
- Arrondissement: Limoux
- Canton: La Haute-Vallée de l'Aude

Government
  - Mayor (2020–2026): Jean-Pierre Esposito
- Area^{1}: 22.38 km^{2} (8.64 sq mi)
- Elevation: 900 m (3,000 ft)
- Highest elevation: 1,180 m (3,870 ft)
- Lowest elevation: 834 m (2,736 ft)
- Population (2023): 283
  - Density: 12.6/km^{2} (32.8/sq mi)
- Time zone: UTC+01:00 (CET)
  - Summer (DST): UTC+02:00 (CEST)
- INSEE/Postal code: 11320 /11340
- ^{1} French Land Register data, which excludes lakes, ponds, glaciers > 1 km^{2} (0.386 sq mi or 247 acres) and river estuaries.

Roquefeuil (French pronunciation: [ʁɔkfœj]; Occitan: Ròcafuèlh) is a commune in the Aude department in southern France.

== Population ==
Historical population
| Year | Pop. | ±% p.a. |
|---|---|---|
| 1968 | 355 | — |
| 1975 | 304 | −2.19% |
| 1982 | 278 | −1.27% |
| 1990 | 262 | −0.74% |
| 1999 | 277 | +0.62% |
| 2007 | 273 | −0.18% |
| 2012 | 282 | +0.65% |
| 2017 | 289 | +0.49% |
| 2023 | 283 | −0.35% |
Source: INSEE

== See also ==
- Communes of the Aude department
- Roquefeuil Versols
