= Antoine René Thévenard =

French Navy officer of the French Revolutionary Wars (1766–1798)

- Born: 1766
- Died: 1 August 1798 (aged 31–32); Aboukir, Egypt
- Relatives: Antoine-Jean-Marie Thévenard (father)
- Military career
- Branch: French Navy
- Rank: Captain
- Conflicts: Battle of the Nile

Antoine René Thévenard (French pronunciation: [ɑ̃twan ʁəne tevnaʁ]; 1766 – 1 August 1798) was a French Navy officer. His name is written Henri-Alexandre Thévenard in some English sources. He was killed while commanding the Aquilon in the battle of the Nile in Aboukir.

== Biography ==
Antoine René Thévenard was born to Antoine-Jean-Marie Thévenard, then a captain of the French East India Company. He was killed on 1 August 1798 during the Battle of the Nile.

In early 1793, he captained the frigate Insurgente with the rank of Lieutenant, and escorted a convoy from Nantes to Brest. He was promoted to Captain in the summer of the same year and appointed to the frigate Révolutionnaire. He took part in the action of 21 October 1794, where a squadron under Sir Edward Pellew captured Révolutionnaire.

In 1794, Thévenard captained the razée frigate Brave, on which he sailed between Brest and Cancale, cruised off Ouessant and Guernsey, and returned to Brest. He was then tasked with leading a division in the Kattegat and the North Sea, his flag on Brave and with the frigates Spartiate and Proserpine, under Villemadrin and Daugier respectively. Thévenard also took part in the Biscay campaign of June 1795 on Brave.

In 1795, Thévenard was appointed to command of the 74-gun Wattignies, on which he sailed from Lorient to Île-d'Aix.

In 1796, Thévenard led the naval division of Saint-Domingue, with his flag on Wattignies; he was promoted to chef de division in the same year. In December, he took part in the Expédition d'Irlande.

Thévenard commanded the 74-gun Aquilon at the battle of the Nile. Early in the battle he used the spring on his anchor cable to angle his broadside into a raking position across the bow of Nelson's flagship, HMS Vanguard, which consequently suffered over 100 casualties, including Nelson, wounded by a piece of shot in the forehead. Thévenard was killed on the first day of the battle; HMS Minotaur captured Aquilon.

== Sources and references ==
Notes

Citations

References

- Roche, Jean-Michel (2005). Dictionnaire des bâtiments de la flotte de guerre française de Colbert à nos jours 1 1671 - 1870. Roche. p. 84. ISBN 978-2-9525917-0-6. OCLC 165892922.
- Taillemite, Étienne (1982). Dictionnaire des Marins français. Paris: Éditions maritimes et d'Outre-Mer. ISBN 9782707000316.
