= Académie de Marine =

Académie de marine
- Académie de marine emblem
- Formation: 1752
- Headquarters: Paris, France
- Location: France
- Official language: French
- President: Professor Jean-Pierre Quéneudec
- Key people: Antoine Louis Rouillé (Founder)
- Website: http://www.academiedemarine.com

The Royal Naval Academy of France (French: Académie royale de marine, pronounced [akademi ʁwajal də maʁin]) was founded at Brest by a ruling of 31 July 1752 by Antoine Louis de Rouillé, comte de Jouy, Secretary of State for the Navy. This institutionalised an earlier initiative by a group of officers from the Brest fleet headed by the artillery captain Sébastien Bigot de Morogues who all wanted to contribute to the modernisation of the French Navy, a group which had very quickly received the approbation of Louis XV.

de Morogues was named the academy's first president and the institution gathered in astronomers, hydrographers, mathematicians and so on, including such names as Dumaitz de Goimpy, Borda, Thévenard, Marguerie, and Claret de Fleurieu, and three of its members (Claret de Fleurieu, Fleuriot de Langle, d'Escures) were to be found amongst La Pérouse's expedition to the Solomon Islands which later disappeared. The academy contributed greatly to the improvement of navigational instruments, and its graduates included Étienne Eustache Bruix.

The institution disappeared temporarily from 1764 to 1769, at the end of the Seven Years' War. In 1769, Aymar Joseph de Roquefeuil, commandant of the Brest fleet, obtained permission for its re-establishment from Louis XV and from Choiseul-Praslin, Secretary of State for the Navy. The academy was linked to the Académie des sciences by an edict of 1771, but was finally suppressed by the National Convention on 8 August 1793 at the same time as all the other academies. It was restored again under the Empire as the "Académie de marine" and continues its work today.
