= French ship Aquilon (1789) =

Ship of the line of the French Navy

- Scale model of Achille, sister ship of French ship Aquilon (1789), on display at the Musée national de la Marine in Paris.

History

France
- Name: Aquilon
- Namesake: Aquilo
- Builder: Rochefort
- Laid down: September 1787
- Launched: 8 June 1789
- Acquired: June 1790
- Captured: 2 August 1798

Great Britain
- Name: Aboukir
- Acquired: 2 August 1798
- Fate: Broken up in Plymouth, 1802

General characteristics
- Class & type: Téméraire-class ship of the line
- Displacement: 3,069 tonneaux
- Tons burthen: 1,537 port tonneaux
- Length: 55.87 m (183 ft 4 in)
- Beam: 14.46 m (47 ft 5 in)
- Draught: 7.15 m (23.5 ft)
- Depth of hold: 7.15 m (23 ft 5 in)
- Sail plan: Full-rigged ship
- Crew: 705
- Armament: 74 guns: Lower gun deck: 28 × 36 pdr guns; Upper gun deck: 30 × 18 pdr guns; Forecastle and Quarterdeck: 16 × 8 pdr guns

Aquilon was a 74-gun Téméraire-class ship of the line built for the French Navy during the 1780s. Completed in 1785, she played a minor role in the French Revolutionary Wars.

== Description ==
The Téméraire-class ships had a length of 55.87 metres (183 ft 4 in), a beam of 14.46 metres (47 ft 5 in) and a depth of hold of 7.15 metres (23 ft 5 in). The ships displaced 3,069 tonneaux and had a mean draught of 7.15 metres (23 ft 5 in). They had a tonnage of 1,537 port tonneaux. Their crew numbered 705 officers and ratings during wartime. They were fitted with three masts and ship rigged.

The muzzle-loading, smoothbore armament of the Téméraire class consisted of twenty-eight 36-pounder long guns on the lower gun deck, thirty 18-pounder long guns and thirty 18-pounder long guns on the upper gun deck. On the quarterdeck and forecastle were a total of sixteen 8-pounder long guns. Beginning with the ships completed after 1787, the armament of the Téméraires began to change with the addition of four 36-pounder obusiers on the poop deck (dunette). Some ships had instead twenty 8-pounders.

== Construction and career ==
Aquilon was laid down at the Arsenal de Rochefort in August 1787. The ship was launched 8 June 1789 and completed in June 1790. She participated in the Italian campaign of 1796–1797, returning to Toulon in April 1798. She served off Italy in Vice-Admiral Brueys' squadron under Captain Antoine-René Thévenard, and took part in the Battle of the Nile, where she fought HMS Vanguard, HMS Minotaur and HMS Theseus. She was captured and recommissioned in the Royal Navy as HMS Aboukir.
