= French ship Royal Louis (1743) =

Ship of the line of the French Navy

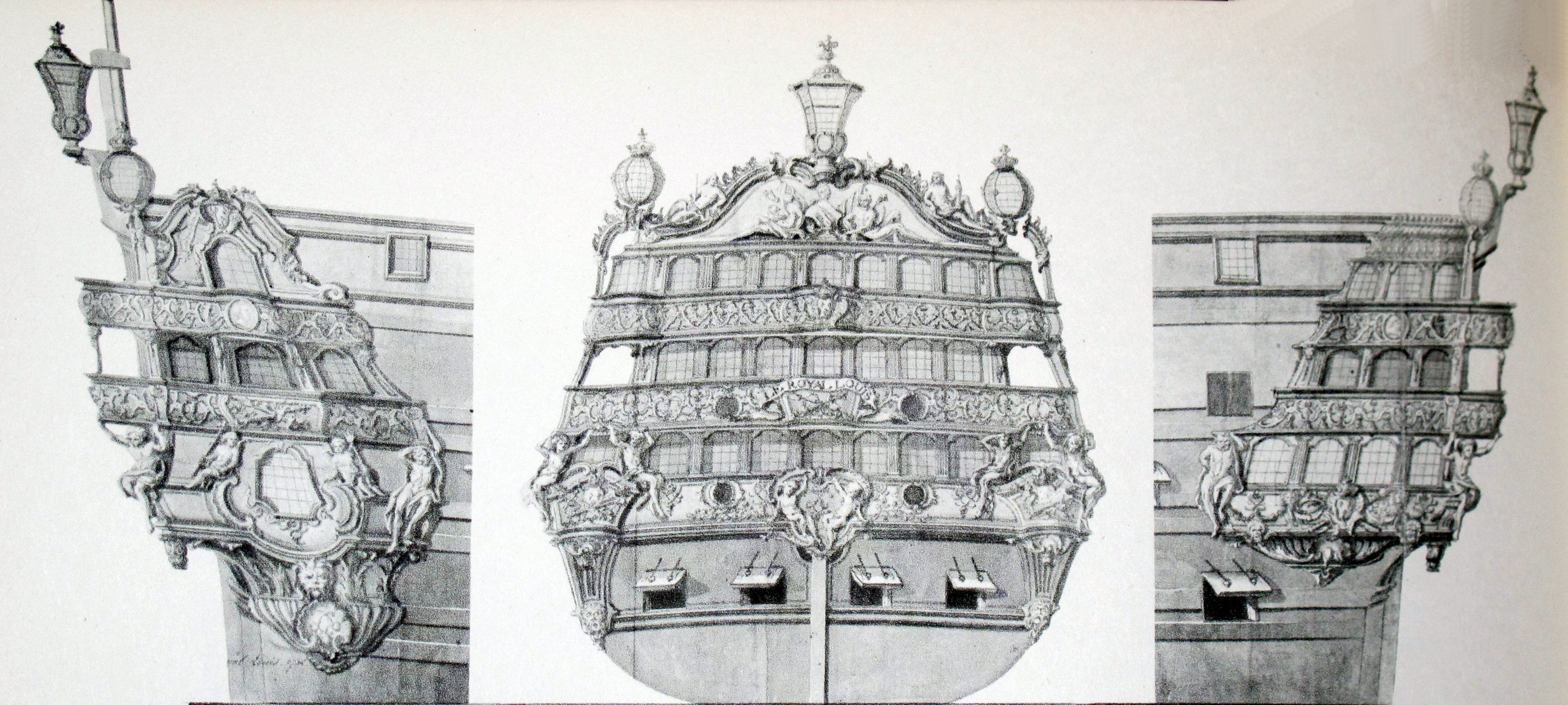
- Decorations of Royal Louis

History

France
- Namesake: Louis XV
- Builder: Brest Dockyard
- Laid down: 13 March 1740
- Launched: (not launched)
- Fate: Burnt on slip

General characteristics
- Class & type: First Rank ship of the line
- Displacement: 4834 tonneaux
- Tons burthen: 3000 port tonneaux
- Length: 185 French feet
- Beam: 50 French feet 8 inches
- Draught: 23¼ - 24¾ French feet (estimated) (Note: The French pre-metric foot was 6.575% longer than the equivalent English foot.)
- Depth of hold: 22 French feet 2 inches
- Decks: 3 gun decks
- Complement: 1,200 (intended, wartime) + 18 officers
- Armament: 118 guns (intended); 32 × 36-pounder guns on lower deck; 34 × 24-pounder guns on middle deck; 34 × 12-pounder guns on upper deck; 18 × 8-pounder guns on quarterdeck and forecastle
- Armour: timber

Royal Louis was a First Rank ship of the line of the French Royal Navy, but was never completed. Launch was scheduled to be in 1743, but on 25 December 1742 she was set alight while still on the stocks, and burnt. It was claimed that this was an act of sabotage by a Señor Pontleau, who was tried and executed for the offence.
