= Aymar Joseph de Roquefeuil et du Bousquet =

French admiral (1714–1782)

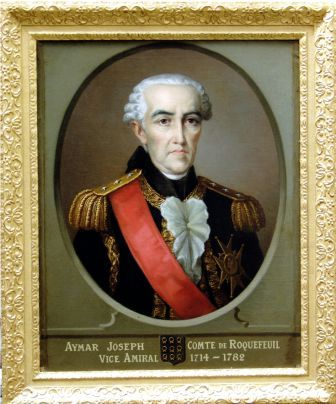
- Born: 19 March 1714; Brest, Kingdom of France
- Died: 1 July 1782 (aged 68); Bourbonne-les-Bains, Kingdom of France
- Military career
- Allegiance: Kingdom of France
- Branch: French Navy
- Service years: 1731–1781
- Rank: Admiral of the French Atlantic Fleet
- Commands: Brest, Brest Castle and Brest Arsenal

Aymar-Joseph de Roquefeuil du Bousquet (19 March 1714, in Brest, France – 1 July 1782, in Bourbonne-les-Bains), comte de Roquefeuil, was a French officer in the French Navy during the reigns of Louis XV and Louis XVI.

== Life ==
Roquefeuil was born at Brest on 19 March 1714.

The eldest son of the naval lieutenant general Jacques Aymar de Roquefeuil du Bousquet and his wife Jeanne-Louise du Main, Aymar Joseph de Roquefeuil was a member of the de Roquefeuil-Blanquefort family, a noble French family from Rouergue. He became a garde-marine at Brest aged 13 in 1727. Rising to ensign (1731), he navigated the Baltic Sea to Saint Domingue and was made lieutenant de vaisseau in 1741 then Capitaine de Vaisseau and knight of the ordre de Saint Louis on 1 January 1746, at only 32 years old, for noteworthy service over the last 19 years. He commanded the "Aquilon" for 15 months in the Antilles in 1750 and 1751. Having the frigate of Duchaffault under his orders and accompanied by a British frigate, he skilfully fulfilled a delicate mission for which he was praised many times by the Rouillé ministry. This allowed him to actively collaborate with vicomte Sébastien-François Bigot de Morogues, commander of Brest, in the foundation of Brest's académie de Marine in 1752, of which he and his younger brother were two of the first members, but which was decimated by the town's losses between 1756 and 1763.

Between 1754 and 1758, Roquefeuil acted as second in command of a squadron in the Antilles, under La Galissonnière, Périer then Bompart. Promoted to chef d'escadre des Armées navales on 1 January 1761, at only 47 years old, and received the command of the ships and port at Brest, to which the king added command of Brest's town and castle and the Isle of Ushant on 25 March 1762 (three positions his father had already held). In a brief presentation the navy minister wrote to the king about Roquefeuil, who approved in his own hand "He has served for nearly 40 years in the Navy, on 16 campaigns, has held 4 commands at sea and has for 5 years commanded the Port of Brest to the satisfaction of His Majesty". Aged 52, he was on 3 August 1766 made lieutenant general, retaining his Brest commands, where he and the minister Duc de Praslin were allowed to promote the new "Académie royale de marine", under royal patronage, in April 1769 – Roquefeuil became its first director. He was promoted to vice-amiral on 6 April 1781 as well as Grand Croix of the Ordre royal et militaire de Saint-Louis.

Roquefeuil died at Bourbonne-les-Bains on 10 July 1782.

== Assessment ==
During his twenty-year command (1761–1781), he directed the development of the French Navy, the Brest fleet, and the port of Brest, followed by two years of service as vice-admiral until his death. His administration was characterized by a commitment to modernization and organizational reform.

Under his leadership, he secured funding from the crown and oversight of the design, construction, and outfitting of several well-equipped vessels. This period saw the creation of what is historically referred to as the "Fleet of Louis XVI," noted for its operational coherence.

While not a widely recognized public figure, naval historians identify him as a primary figure in the execution of the naval policies of Louis XV and Louis XVI. These efforts contributed significantly to the naval capabilities that supported French and American forces during the American Revolutionary War.
