= Jean Alt =

French scientist (born 1921)

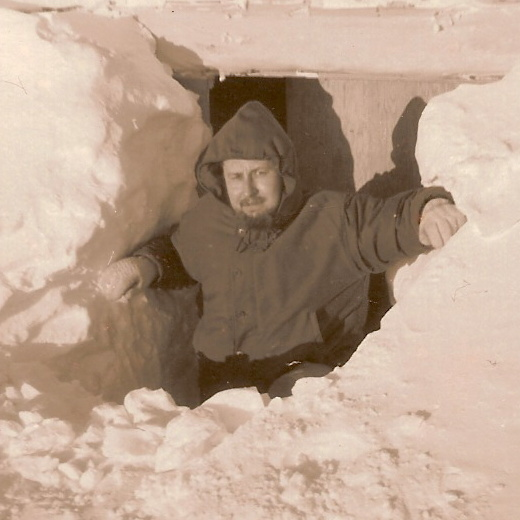
- Born: 8 August 1921; Paris, France
- Died: 22 July 1991 (aged 69); Savigny-sur-Orge, France
- Occupations: Scientist, Meteorologist, Polar explorer
- Known for: Alt Glacier
- Children: 4

Jean Alt (8 August 1921 – 22 July 1991) was a French scientist and meteorologist. He was born in Paris.

== International Geophysical Year (57-58) ==
Alt was a scientist of the IGY. He took part in the American mission Deep Freeze III in Little America V (an Antarctica base) during the winter of 1958. He stayed 16 months in Antarctica.

He was part of the little America V team in the same period that Albert P. Crary

Later the Advisory Committee on Antarctic Names gave his name to a glacier: the Alt Glacier

== Bibliography ==
- Alt, Jean; Astapenko, P.; Ropar, Nicholas J. (1959). Some Aspects of the Antarctic Atmospheric Circulation in 1958. IGY World Data Center, National Academy of Sciences.
