= Jacques Aymar de Roquefeuil et du Bousquet =

French Navy admiral

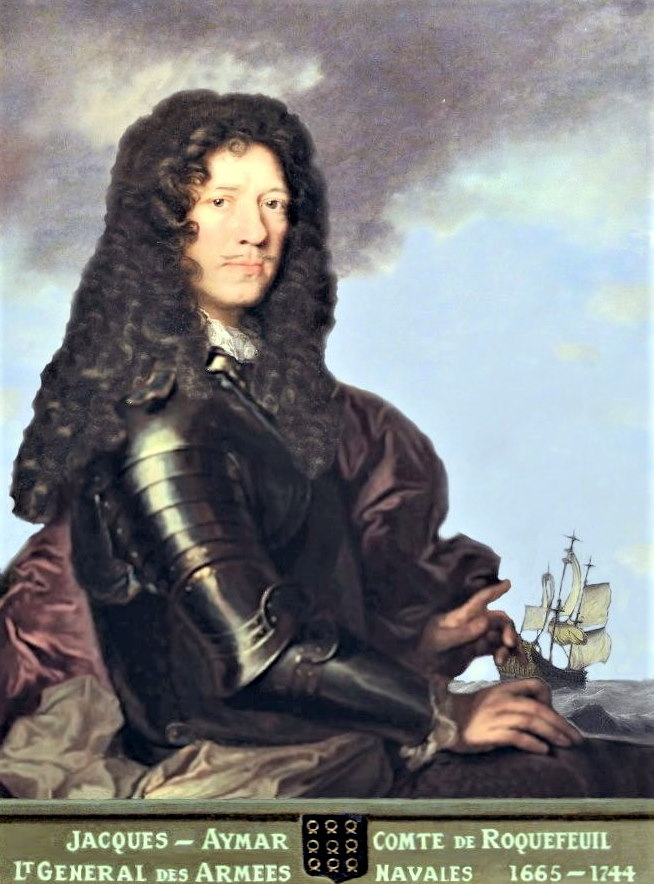
- Born: 14 November 1665
- Died: 8/9 March 1744
- Relatives: de Roquefeuil-Blanquefort family
- Military career
- Branch: French Navy
- Rank: admiral

Jacques Aymar de Roquefeuil du Bousquet (14 November 1665, in château du Bousquet, Montpeyroux, Rouergue – 8/9 March 1744) was a French Navy admiral.

== Family ==
He was a member of the de Roquefeuil-Blanquefort family from Languedoc in France. His father left him the hereditary government of the town of Rodez, which the king invested him with upon his marriage in 1711. His mother was Victoire de Moret, granddaughter of Madeleine de Bourbon.

On 4 August 1712, he married Jeanne Louise du Main d'Angeret, and they had:

- Aymar-Joseph, Vice Admiral of France
- René-Aymar, Chef d'escadre
