= Anse de Sablettes =

Fortified bay near Toulon in France

Coordinates: 43°4′42″N 5°53′30″E

Anse de Sablettes is a fortified bay near Toulon in France, immediately to the south of the port entrance. It was the site of the Battle of Sablettes, a 1759 battle of the Seven Years' War.

== Course ==
In mid-May 1759, Edward Boscawen was found on Brodrick off Toulon and took over his command of the British forces, blockading Toulon and Marseille and ensuring the safety of Gibraltar. Along with continuing the blockade with his 13 ships of the line and two 50-gun ships, Boscawen placed his 12 cruisers at strategic points and on convoy escort duty. Three months later, the French forces had retired into the inner roadstead, covered by the guns of Toulon's fortress, but still thought that such a large British force could not be solely meant for a blockade and must mean a landing was imminent - aware of this by captured letters, Boscawen encouraged this impression by threatening attacks on various points.

On 7 June, two French frigates attempting to breach the blockade from outside were forced to anchor in the Anse de Sablettes. Despite the nine French batteries covering the bay, Boscawen sent in HMS Culloden, HMS Conqueror and HMS Jersey to sink the frigates. They failed to do so and, heavily damaged (the Culloden had to go to Gibraltar to refit), withdrew after an hour under the batteries' guns.
