= French ship Royal Louis (1668) =

Ship of the line of the French Navy

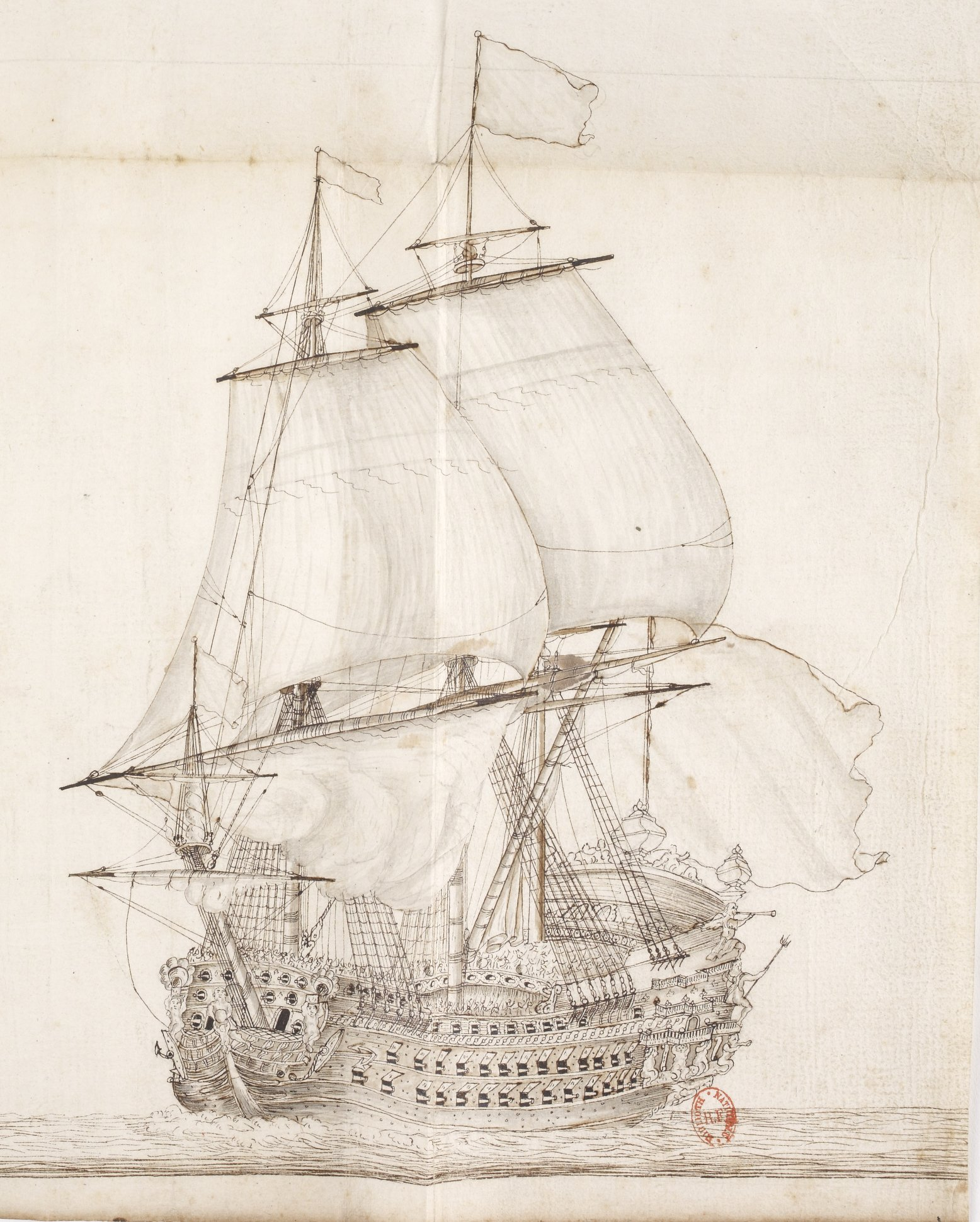

History

France
- Name: Royal Louis
- Namesake: Louis XIV
- Builder: Rodolphe Gédéon, Toulon Dockyard
- Laid down: December 1666
- Launched: 1 February 1668
- Completed: August 1669
- Out of service: January 1691
- Renamed: Royal Louis Vieux in 1692
- Motto: "I am unmatched over the waves and my king is it in the world."
- Fate: Broken up 1697

General characteristics
- Class & type: First Rank ship of the line
- Tonnage: 2,400
- Length: 163 French feet (Note: the French pre-metric foot measured 32.48394 cm, and was thus 6.575% longer than the equivalent English foot.)
- Beam: 44 French feet 4 inches
- Draught: 22 French feet
- Depth of hold: 21 French feet
- Decks: 3 gun decks
- Complement: 800, +9 officers
- Armament: 104 guns: 12 36-pounder long guns + 16 24-pounder long guns on lower deck; 26 18-pounder long guns on middle deck; 26 12-pounder long guns on upper deck; 20 6-pounder long guns on quarterdeck and forecastle; 4 4-pounder long guns on poop

Royal Louis was a ship of the line of the French Royal Navy. She was constructed at Toulon between 1666 and 1669 under the direction of Rodolphe Gédéon and served as flagship of the French fleet in the Mediterranean Sea.

While intended when first built to serve as the flagship of François de Vendôme, duc de Beaufort, for the Cretan campaign of 1669, she was not ready in time, and she saw no service until 1677. She underwent reconstruction at Toulon from December 1676 to April 1677; four of her 24-pounder guns were replaced by four 36-pounders on the lower deck, two more 18-pounders were added on her middle deck, and two 6-pounders were removed from her quarterdeck, thus keeping her as a 104-gun ship.

She then sailed from Toulon on 11 May 1677, under the command of Abraham Duquesne, to Messina in Sicily, at the head of a small squadron to support rebels opposing Spanish rule there. On returning to Toulon, she saw no further sea service until taken out of service in 1691.

On his visit to Toulon in 1683, the English naval engineer Edmund Dummer described the Royal Louis as "a great ship and glorious in her first carving, no doubt; but to my judgment not of good proportion, nor good workmanship, her figure under water I know not, nor is that above to be admired".

She was removed from service in 1691, and taken to pieces at Toulon in 1697, having been replaced by a new First Rank ship of the same name.

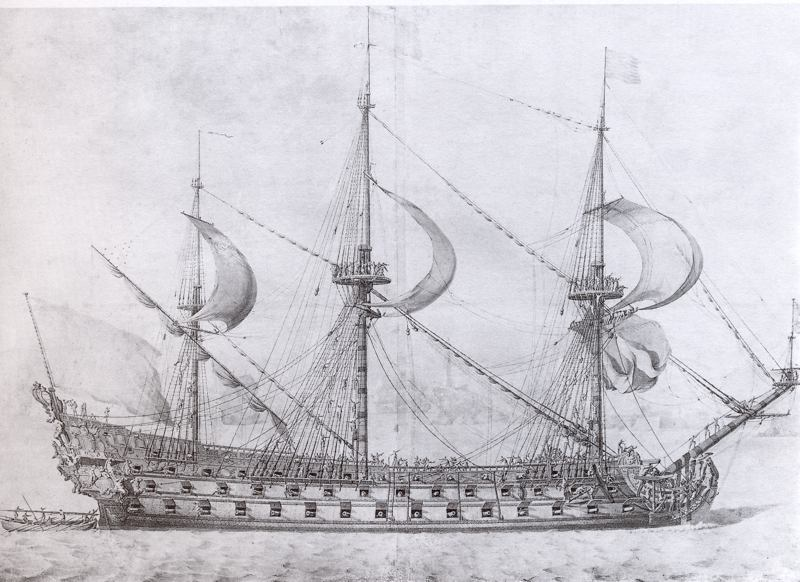
Drawing by Pierre Puget
