= French ship Royal Louis (1692) =

Ship of the line of the French Navy

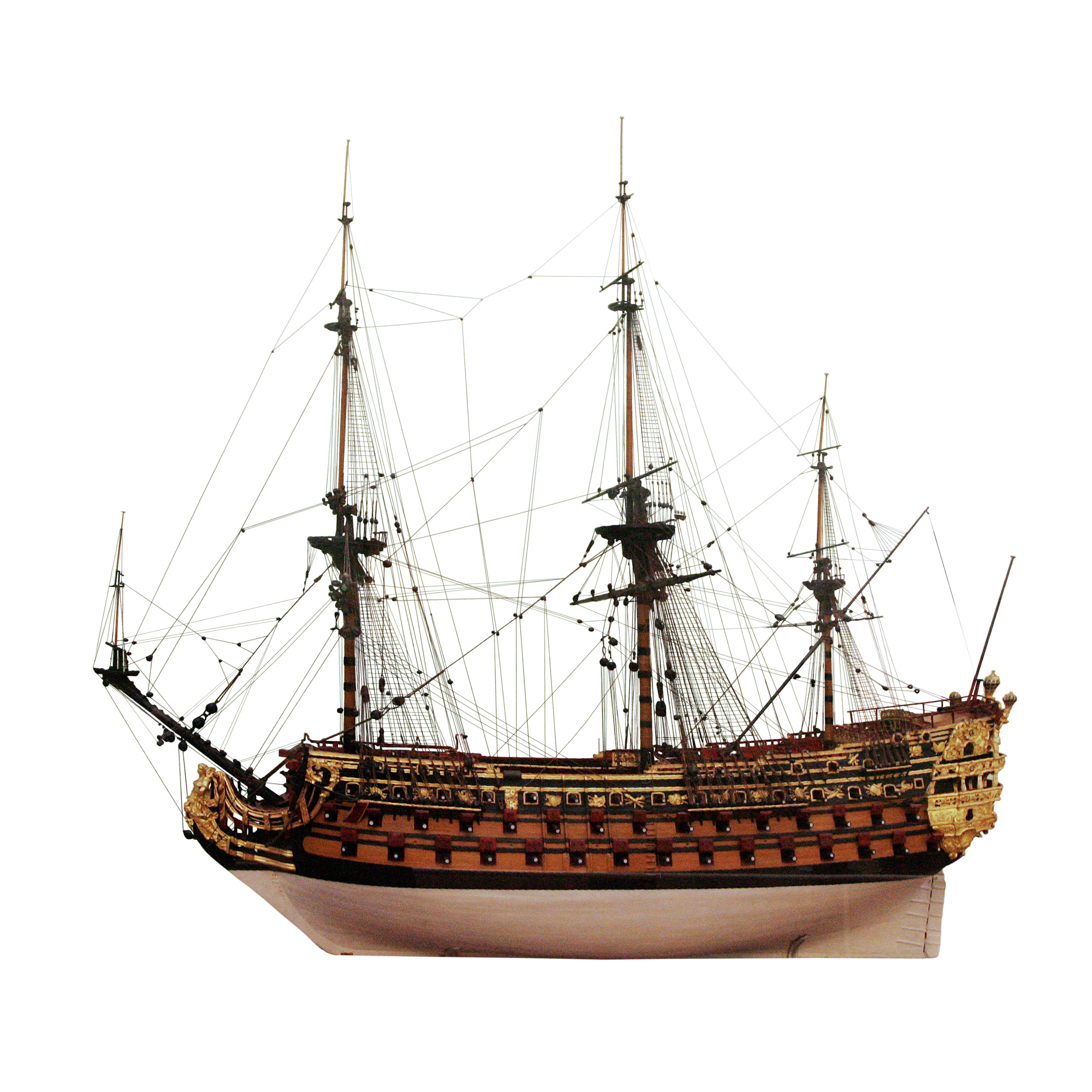
- Contemporary model of Royal Louis, on display at the Musée de la Marine

History

France
- Name: Royal Louis
- Namesake: Louis XIV
- Builder: François Coulomb, Toulon Dockyard
- Laid down: 9 April 1692
- Launched: 22 September 1692
- Completed: May 1693
- Out of service: 1723
- Stricken: 1723
- Fate: Broken up 1727

General characteristics
- Class & type: First Rank ship of the line
- Displacement: 3928 tonneaux (Note: The French pre-metric ton was 0.9635% of the English ton.)
- Tons burthen: 2600 port tonneaux
- Length: 174 French feet (Note: The French pre-metric foot was 6.575% longer than the English foot.)
- Beam: 48 French feet (15.59 m)
- Draught: 21 - 26 French feet (6.82 - 8.45 m)
- Depth of hold: 23 French feet (7.47 m)
- Complement: 1,050 in wartime; 990 in peacetime
- Armament: 120 guns; 30 48-pounder long guns on lower deck; 32 18-pounder long guns on middle deck; 28 12-pounder long guns on upper deck; 16 6-pounder long guns on quarterdeck and forecastle; 4 4-pounder long guns on poop
- Armour: timber

Royal Louis was a First Rank ship of the line of the French Royal Navy, designed and constructed by François Coulomb. She replaced an earlier ship of the same name.

Following completion in 1693, the 48-pounder guns on her lower deck were replaced by 36-pounders. She initially had 6-pounder guns, later replaced by 8-pounders, and 4-pounders, replaced by 6-pounders.

Brest Dockyard noted in 1715 that she was usable only in summertime and her upperworks were beginning to rot. She was condemned in 1723 at Brest and broken up there in 1727.
