= Saint-Front-sur-Lémance =

- Commune
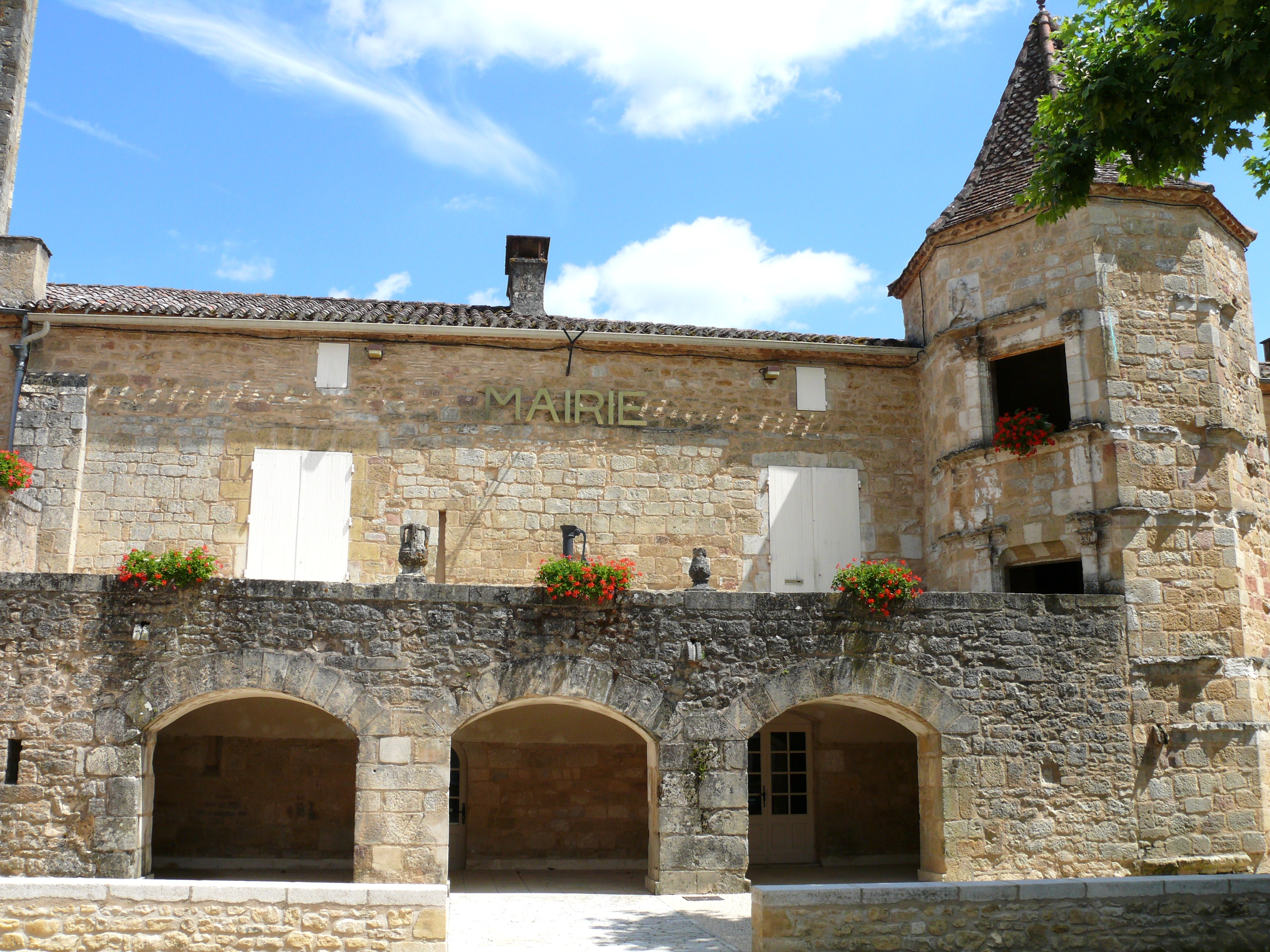
- The town hall in Saint-Front-sur-Lémance
- Location of Saint-Front-sur-Lémance
- Location within France Location within Nouvelle-Aquitaine
- Coordinates: 44°34′39″N 0°58′20″E
- Country: France
- Region: Nouvelle-Aquitaine
- Department: Lot-et-Garonne
- Arrondissement: Villeneuve-sur-Lot
- Canton: Le Fumélois

Government
  - Mayor (2020–2026): Marie Costes
- Area^{1}: 19.58 km^{2} (7.56 sq mi)
- Elevation: 107 m (351 ft)
- Highest elevation: 276 m (906 ft)
- Lowest elevation: 99 m (325 ft)
- Population (2023): 492
  - Density: 25.1/km^{2} (65.1/sq mi)
- Time zone: UTC+01:00 (CET)
  - Summer (DST): UTC+02:00 (CEST)
- INSEE/Postal code: 47242 /47500
- ^{1} French Land Register data, which excludes lakes, ponds, glaciers > 1 km^{2} (0.386 sq mi or 247 acres) and river estuaries.

Saint-Front-sur-Lémance (French pronunciation: [sɛ̃ fʁɔ̃ syʁ lemɑ̃s]; Languedocien: Sent Front de Lemança) is a commune in the Lot-et-Garonne department in south-western France.

== See also ==
- Communes of the Lot-et-Garonne department
