= House of Roquefeuil-Anduze =

French noble family

- Parent house: House of Roquefeuil
- Country: France
- Founded: 1150
- Founder: Raymond I of Roquefeuil
- Titles: Comtor of Nant; Viscount of Creyssels; Baron of Roquefeuil-Meyrueis
- Motto: Honour me resto, resto m'a basto! Honour remains, it is enough!
- Cadet branches: Versols

The House of Roquefeuil-Anduze is an old French noble family. It was formed in 1129 after the marriage between Adelaïs of Roquefeuil and Bernard of Anduze. Heiress of the first Roquefeuil family, Adelaïs inherited from her father and transmitted her family possessions to her son Raymond.

Both the Roquefeuil and Anduze family controlled vast territories in the Languedoc, France under various noble titles and coined money.

== Origin of the Roquefeuil family ==
The Roquefeuil family appeared in 900 as an offshoot of the house of Barcelona and became one of the most illustrious noble families in the south of France. Their possessions in the Languedoc, France included the barony of Roquefeuil-Meyrueis or the viscounty of Creyssels. Some ruins of the Roquefeuil castle still exits in Saint-Jean du Bruel (formerly Saint-Jean of Roquefeuil).

== Roquefeuil-Anduze ==
In 1129, Bertrand of Anduze married the heiress Adélaïde of Roquefeuil. Their son Raymond maintained the name of Roquefeuil and inherited from his mother creating the House of Roquefeuil-Anduze. He and his descendants fought in multiple medieval wars: the Cathar Crusade, the Seventh Crusade and the Hundred Years War.

- Raymond I of Roquefeuil, son of Bertrand of Anduze and Adelaïde of Roquefeuil married Guillemette of Montpellier. She was the daughter of Guilhem VII and Mathilde of Bourgogne. They gave birth to:
  - Raymond II of Roquefeuil who took part in the Fourth Council of the Lateran. With his wife Dauphine de Turenne he had at least one daughter: Isabeau of Roquefeuil who married in 1230 Hugues IV of Rodez. He also took part in the Seventh Crusade and his coat of arms were painted at Versailles in the Hall of Crusades.
  - Arnaud I of Roquefeuil who later succeeded his brother as head of household. He married in 1228 Beatrix of Anduze with whom he had six legitimate children. He also sired Guillaume or William who was legitimated in 1263 by the king of Aragon and formed the Roquefeuil-Versol branch.
    - Raymond III of Roquefeuil married in 1259 Alazie du Tournel who gave him ten children.
      - Raymond IV of Roquefeuil married in 1287 Vaurie of Hébrail.
        - Arnaud II of Roquefeuil served the king John II of France during his campaigns in Agenais, was named seneschal of Périgord in 1360 and later ambassador. He was known for the war he won and declared to the king James II of Majorca who previously killed his eldest son Bernard. The pope Clement IV and the king Philip VI of France intervened and set the terms of the compromise. Arnaud declared "Honour remains, it is enough" which became the Motto of the family.
          - Arnaud III of Roquefeuil was captain of Montpellier. He married in 1361 Hélène of Gourdon and had five daughters. The eldest, Catherine of Roquefeuil married in 1393 Jean of Blanquefort and inherited of the Roquefeuil-Anduze family. Jean substituted its name and gave birth to the House of Roquefeuil-Blanquefort.

== Roquefeuil-Versols ==
William of Roquefeuil' seal on the treaty of Corbeil

William I of Roquefeuil, was born in 1230 and received from his parents the land of Versol married Ricarde of Bonvoisin who gave him two sons: Jean and Raymond

With his brother Raymond, William supported the king James I of Aragon during the Spanish Reconquista. From his military success, James I of Aragon named him governor of Montepellier and Adelantado maior of Murcia. He also signed the Treaty of Corbeil on behalf of James I of Aragon in 1258.

=== Branch La Tour and La Roquette ===
Jean of Roquefeuil's descendance formed different branches:

The branch of La Tour which ended in 1729

The branch of La Roquette was funded by Jean of Roquefeuil married in 1534 with Anne of Vergnole lady of La Roquette.

- Fulcrand of Roquefeuil married Mary of Fay-Péraud in 1583. He received from his parents and grand parents the land of La Roquette.
  - François of Roquefeuil was colonel and married in 1618 Jacquette of Agulhon.
    - Henry of Roquefeuil became marquess of La Roquette. Married with Cécile of Mac-Mahon, he had one son who died in 1892 with no descendance.

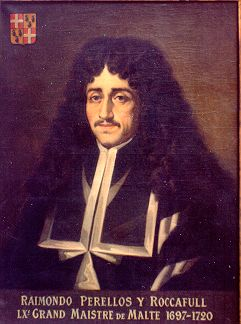
Raimondo Perellos y Roccafull

=== Branch of Rocafull ===
Created by Raymond, cadet brother of Jean, his branch actively participated in the Reconquista and supported the kings of Aragon and latter of Spain.

Some of its most famous members included:

- William Emmanuel de Rocafull-Puigmarín y Rocaberti, duke of Mandas, marquess of Anglesola, count of Albatera, count of Peralada. He received the title of grandee by Philip V of Spain in 1704.
- Ramon Perellos y Roccaful, grand master of the knights hospitaller from 1697 to 1720. Ramon was buried in St John's Co-Cathedral in Malta.

=== Branch of Versols-Saint-Etienne ===
Rigaud of Roquefeuil married in 1411 to Béatrix of Maffred and formed a cadet branch that became the elder branch at the extinstion of the branch of versols. Henri of Roquefeuil, did not marry but had an extramarital son (who he later recognised), named Henry de Roquefeuil. This son's descendants still remain in Languedoc to this day. At the French Revolution this branch lost its particle. Following this, this branch mainly produced doctors or lawyers but also a notable politician:

- Pierre-Frédéric Roquefeuil was conseiller général of the Hérault department at the end of the Second Empire.

== See also ==
- House of Roquefeuil-Blanquefort
- Treaty of Corbeil
- Grandee of Spain
