= Cracherode =

Cracherode (pronounced?) is a surname. Notable people with the surname include:

- Anthony Cracherode (c. 1674–1752), British lawyer and politician
- Clayton Mordaunt Cracherode (1730–1799), English book collector and benefactor of the British Museum
- Mordaunt Cracherode (died 1773 or 1768), lieutenant governor of Fort St. Philip, Minorca
