= Henrietta Street, Covent Garden =

Street in Covent Garden, London

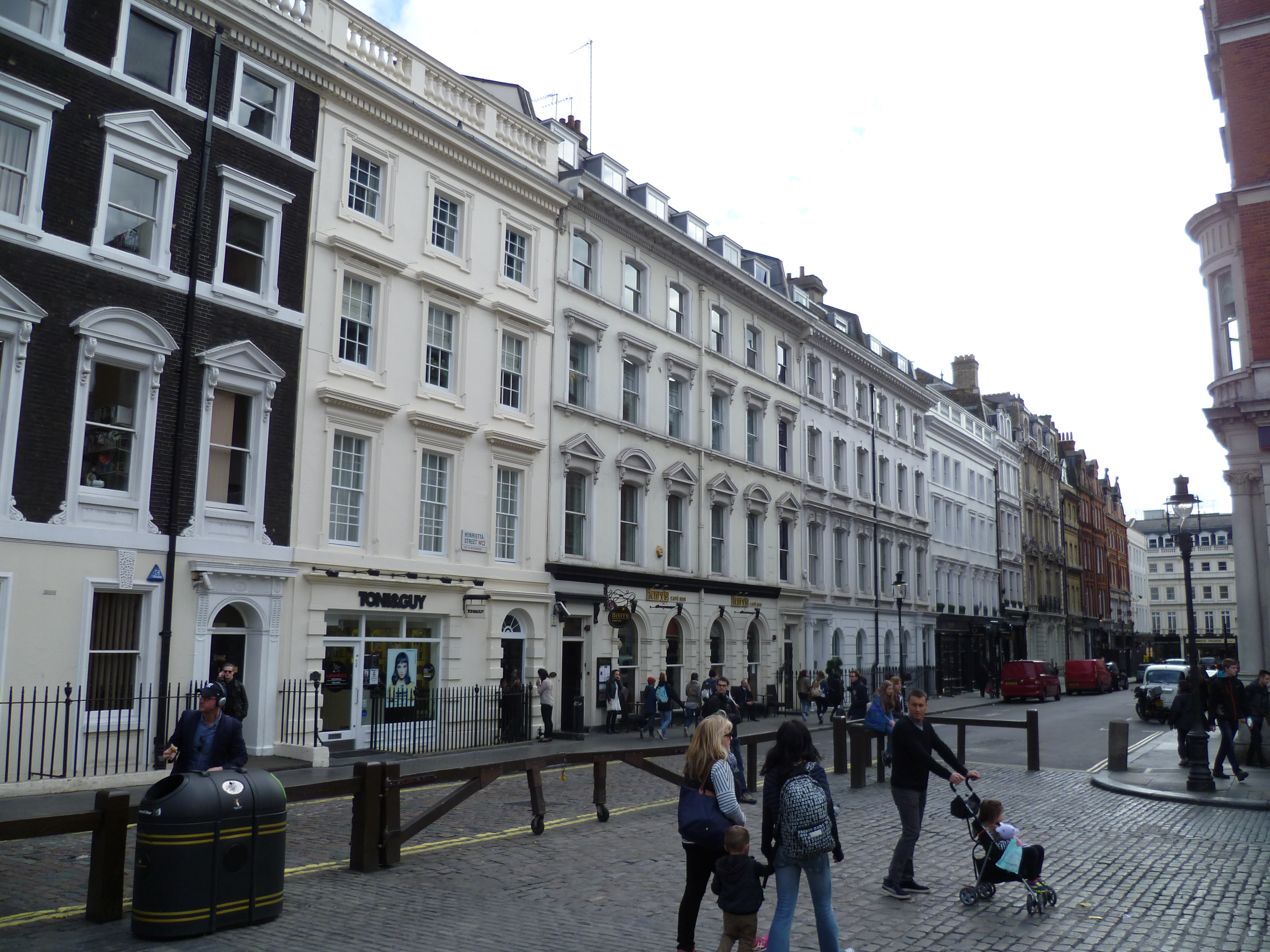
Henrietta Street

Henrietta Street is a street in Covent Garden, London, that was once home to a number of artists and later became the location of many publishing firms.

== Location ==
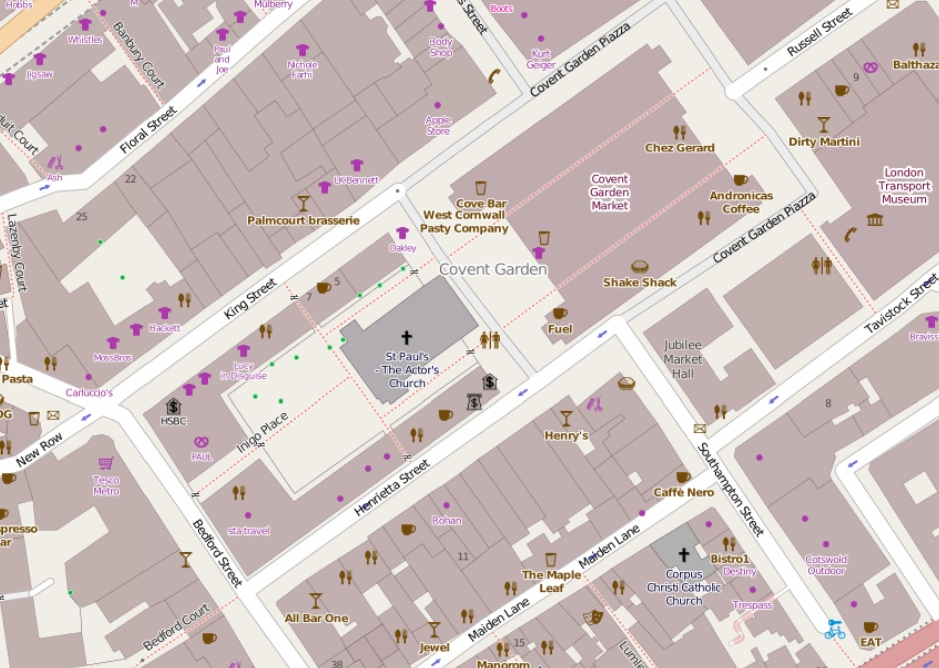
The immediate vicinity of Henrietta Street today

Henrietta Street is near to Covent Garden piazza. It continues Southampton Street at its eastern end and joins Bedford Street in the west.

== History ==
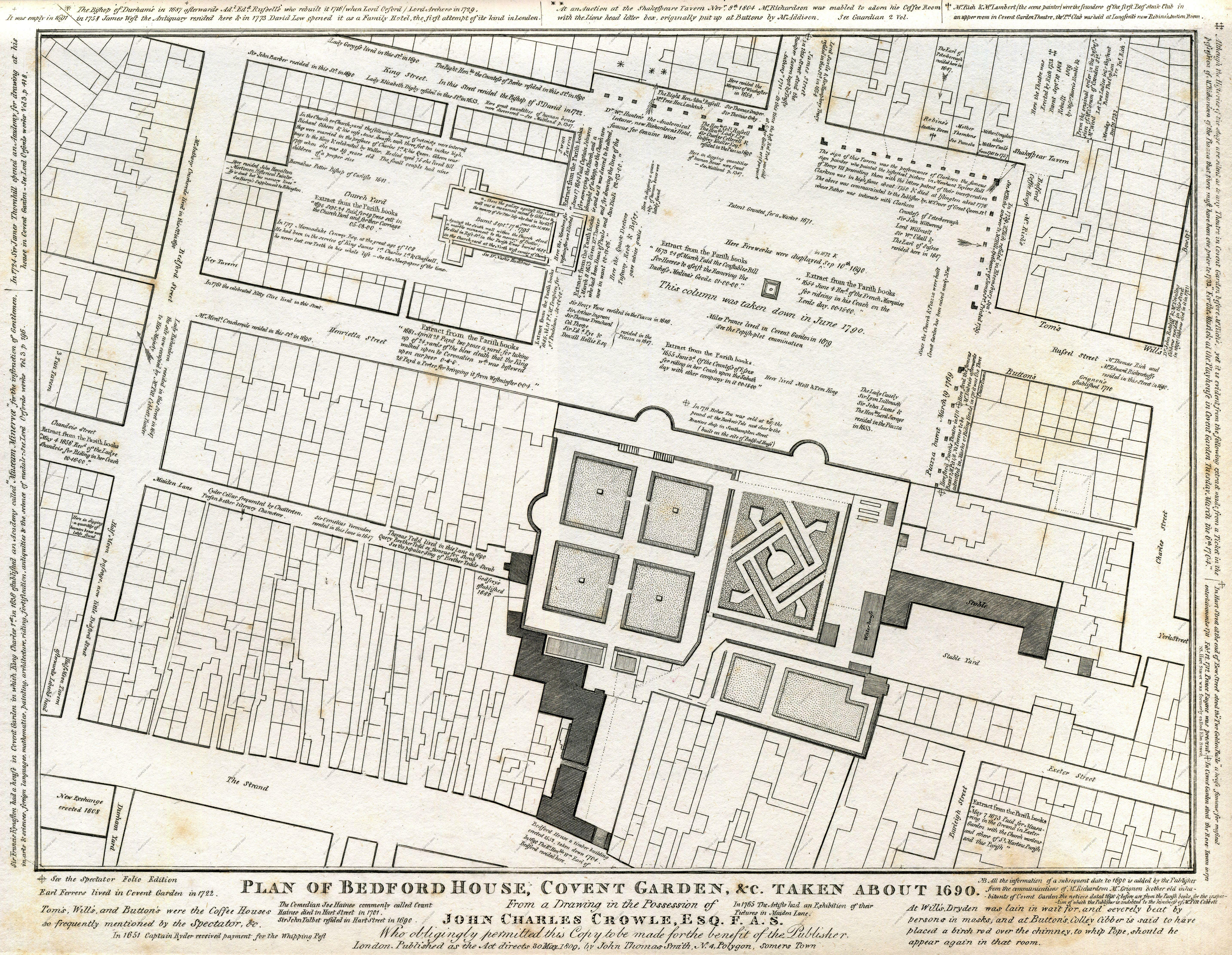
Henrietta Street on a 1690 map, before Southampton Street was built

Henrietta Street was first planned from 1631 and building was completed by 1634. Although the street plan is unchanged from the original, most of the houses are of nineteenth-century construction. The street was named after the consort of Charles I.

The street was originally shorter than it is now but in 1705–06, Bedford House, a timber building of 1552 that fronted the Strand, was demolished and the south side of Henrietta Street extended to the place where it is now joined by Southampton Street.

The original occupants of the street were mainly tradesmen but later members of the nobility had houses in the street. By 1667 there were five shops, and ten by 1669. In the early 1700s, John Strype described the street as "generally taken up by eminent Tradesmen, as Mercers, Lacemen, Drapers, etc". In 1763, Thomas Mortimer's The Universal Director recorded that there were twelve residents, who included three artists, a baker, a surgeon, a linen draper, two stockbrokers, a mercer and three apothecaries.

By the 1870s the street had become the home of a number of publishing firms and in 1874 The Builder described it as "fast becoming the Paternoster-row of the West End". Among publishers, Williams and Norgate had their offices at number 14 and in the twentieth century Victor Gollancz were in the street. More recently, Greenwood Publishing Group and Dorling Kindersley have had offices in Henrietta Street.

In 1885, the Theatrical Mission opened Macready House as a club for vulnerable young women working in the nearby London theatres. Cheap lunches and teas were provided, and arrangements made to look after any children employed on the stage. Later, accommodation was also provided.

== Inhabitants ==
Catherine Clive
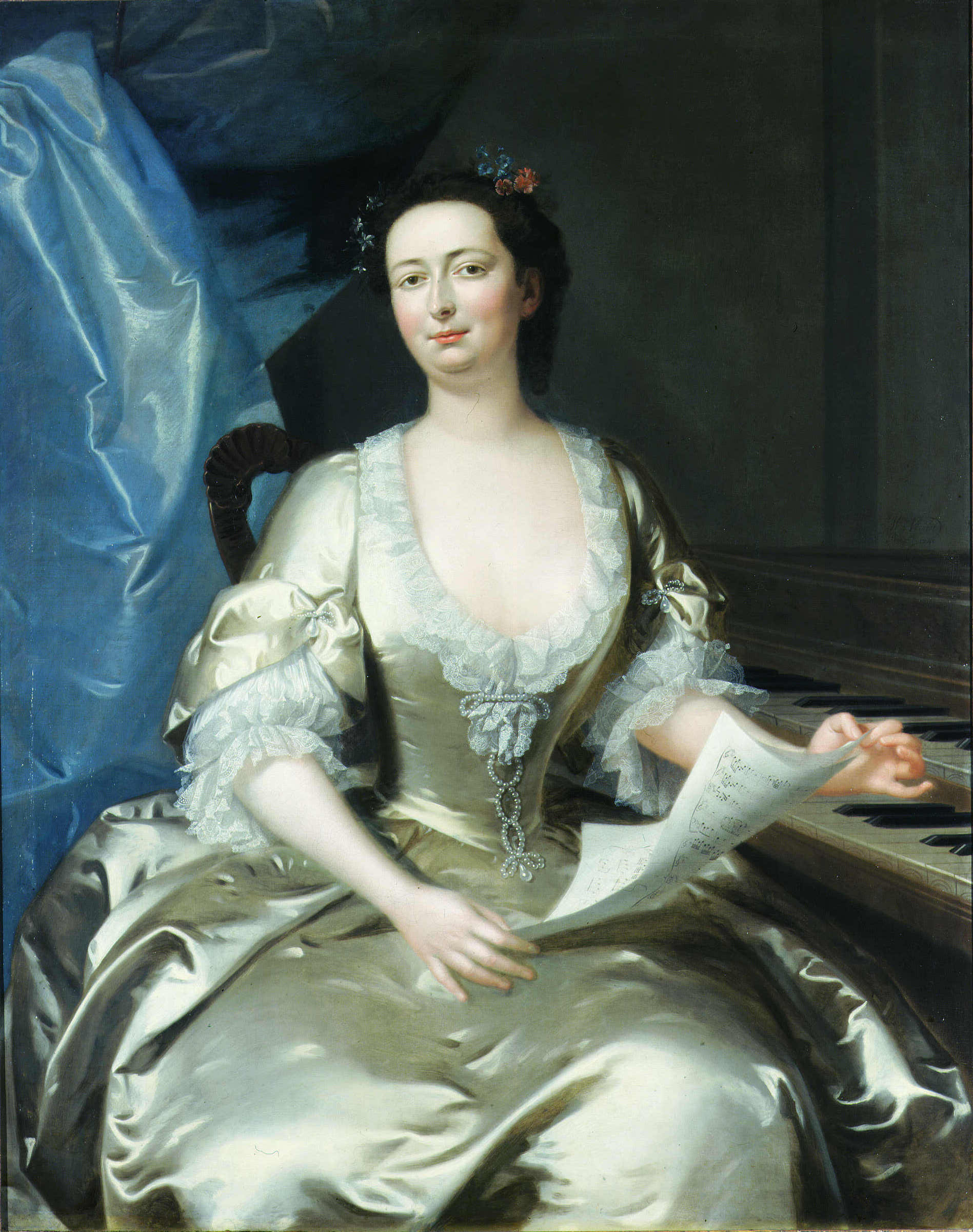
- Artist: William Verelst (1704-1752)
- Year: 1740
- Catalogue: G0122
- Medium: Oil on canvas
- Dimensions: 124.5 cm × 99 cm (49.0 in × 39 in)
- Location: The Garrick Club, London; 51.511488°N 0.126327°W
- Accession: 1854
- Website: garrick.ssl.co.uk/object-g0122

In 1690, Colonel Mordaunt Cracherode, father of Clayton Mordaunt Cracherode and in charge of the marines during George Anson's voyage round the world, lived in the street.

From 1747 to 1758, seascape painter Samuel Scott lived at No. 2, overlooking the Piazza.

In 1761, the actress Kitty Clive lived in the street.

In 1814, Jane Austen visited her brother Henry at number 10, where he was then living.

== Listed buildings ==
There are a number of listed buildings in the street.

Number 25–29 on the north side is the former St. Peter's Hospital which is grade II listed and the largest building in the street. The hospital was designed by J. M. Brydon in the "Queen Anne" style and opened in 1882. Henry Clutton, the ninth Duke of Bedford's architect, required amendments to be made to the design to suit the Bedford Estate's requirements. The building was constructed in such a way as to allow it to be converted in the future into residential flats and chambers.

== Coffee houses ==
Several coffee houses existed in the street. The earliest known is Braxton's (1702) at number 24, which became Rawthmell's in 1715 and later moved to number 25. The Royal Society of Arts was formed at Rawthmell's in 1754.

== Pubs ==
In the mid-seventeenth century there were five pubs in Henrietta Street but following the suppression of the Unicorn Tavern at No. 37 by the Bedford Estate in the 1880s there ceased to be pubs in the street. There were none in 1970 when Sheppard's Survey of London was produced and there are none today, though there are several bars and eating places.

In 1772, the poet Sheridan fought a duel with Matthews at the Castle Tavern, located on the north corner with Bedford Street, after Matthews insulted Sheridan in the Bath Chronicle.
