= William Bokenham =

William Bokenham (died 10 November 1702) was Royal Navy officer and Whig politician who sat in the House of Commons from 1701 to 1702.

Bokenham was commissioned as a lieutenant in the Royal Navy on 10 August 1681 and became a captain on 7 May 1689. He was captain of HMS Happy Return from 1689 to 1690, of HMS Monck in 1691 and on HMS Duchess from 1693 to 1694. In 1696 he was first captain to Sir George Rooke and was later first captain to Lord Berkeley.

In 1700 Bokenham acquired Digs Court, otherwise called Digges, in the parish of Westwell, Kent.

In November 1701 Bokenham was elected Member of Parliament (MP) for Rochester in the government interest, and held the seat until July 1702.

In August 1702, Bokenham became captain of HMS Association, a ninety gun ship. He took part in the Battle of Vigo Bay on 23 October 1702 when his ship fired broadsides at the battery on the left of the harbour, which soon disabled it. Vigo Bay was a resounding victory for the Anglo-Dutch forces against the French.

Bokenham's property in Rochester was inherited by his brother Robert, who was also a naval captain. The properties were later inherited by another brother Harry Bokenham, and Harry's daughter Anne Bokenham and her husband John Dumaresq, son of Elias Dumaresq who sold it in 1729.

Parliament of England
Preceded by Sir Joseph Williamson; Admiral Sir Cloudesley Shovell	Member of Parliament for Rochester; 1701–1702; With: Francis Barrell	Succeeded by Edward Knatchbull; William Cage
