= Stafford Fairborne =

Royal Navy Admiral of the Fleet (1666–1742)

Sir Stafford Fairborne
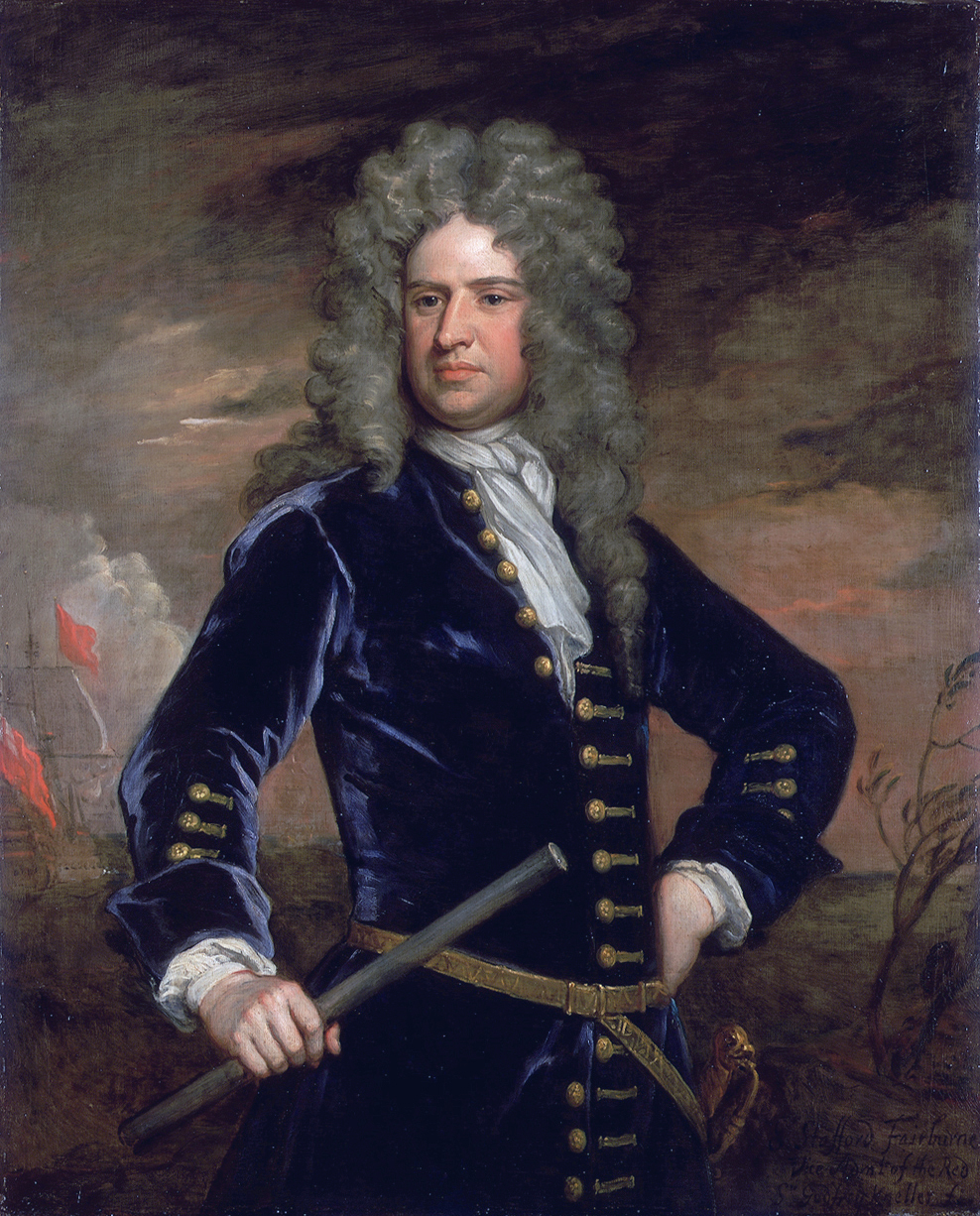
- Portrait by Sir Godfrey Kneller, 1703–1708
- Born: 1666
- Died: 11 November 1742 (aged 75–76)
- Burial place: Westminster Abbey
- Military career
- Allegiance: England; Great Britain
- Branch: Royal Navy
- Service years: 1681–1715
- Rank: Admiral of the Fleet
- Commands: HMS Bonaventure; HMS Half Moon; HMS Richmond; HMS Phoenix; HMS Warspite; HMS Elizabeth; HMS Monck; HMS Victory; HMS Defiance; HMS London; HMS Albemarle; HMS Torbay; HMS Suffolk; HMS Tilbury
- Conflicts: Nine Years' War; War of the Spanish Succession
- Other work: MP for Rochester

Admiral of the Fleet Sir Stafford Fairborne (1666 – 11 November 1742) was a Royal Navy officer and Whig politician. As a captain he saw action in command of various ships at the Battle of Beachy Head, at the Battle of Barfleur and at the Battle of Lagos during the Nine Years' War.

As a flag officer Fairborne was given command of the inshore squadron in a fleet sent to the Mediterranean during the War of the Spanish Succession. The fleet was defeated at the Battle of Cádiz but later achieved a victory at the Battle of Vigo Bay. He later became Second-in-Command, under Sir Cloudesley Shovell, of the Mediterranean Fleet and was present at the siege and capture of Barcelona. After that he was given command of a squadron sent to La Rochelle and took part in the capture of Ostend.

Fairborne represented Rochester as a Member of Parliament from 1705 to 1710 and also served as a member of the council of the Lord High Admiral (an office vested at that time in Prince George of Denmark).

== Early career ==
Born the eldest son of Sir Palmes Fairborne, Governor of Tangiers and Margery Fairborne (née Devereux), Fairborne became a King's letter boy in 1681. Promoted to lieutenant, he commanded the fourth-rate HMS Bonaventure during the captain's illness in a successful encounter with some Salé vessels off Mamora in June 1685 and, after being promoted to commander on 12 July 1686, he was given command of the Salé prize HMS Half Moon later that month. Fairborne's patron from this time was Admiral Arthur Herbert.

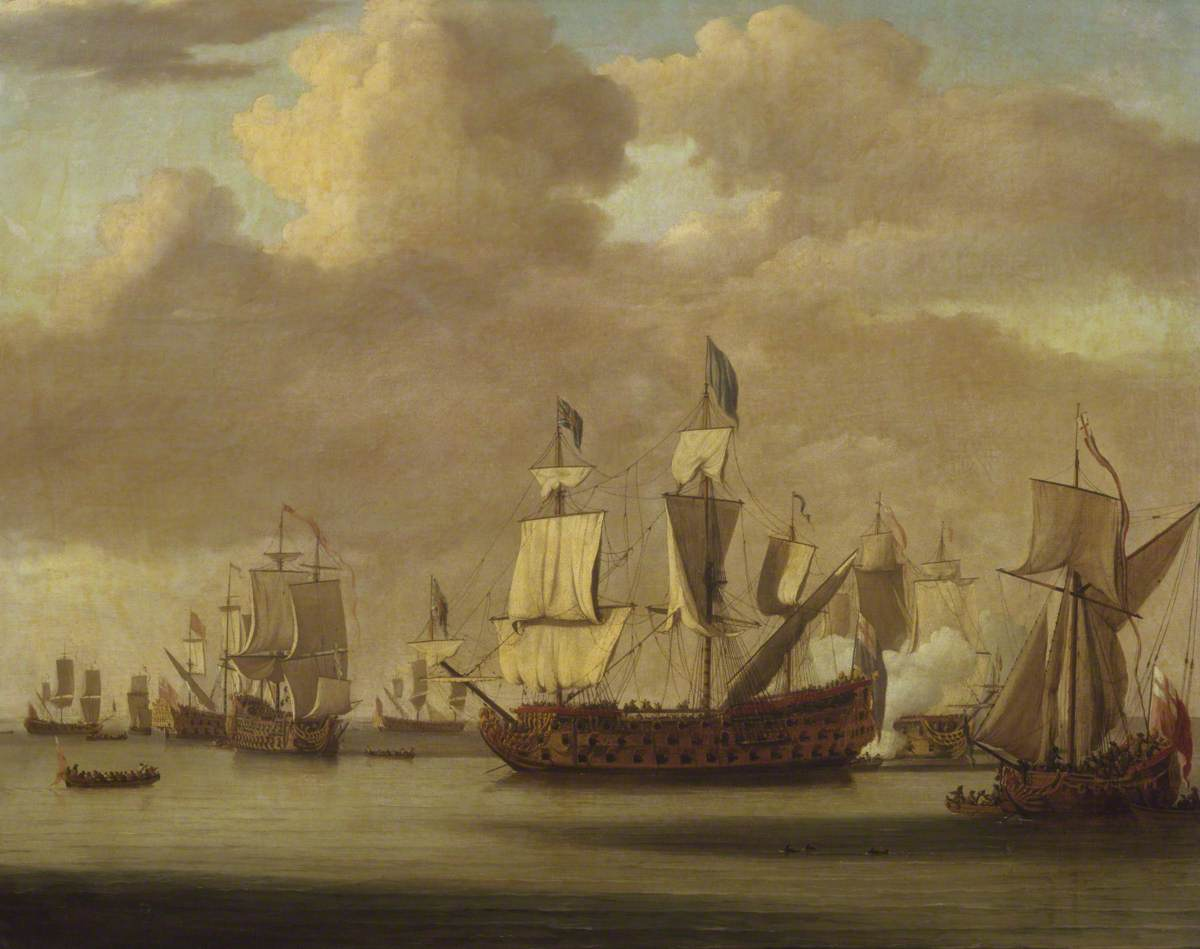
The first-rate HMS Victory, which Fairborne commanded in 1695

Promoted to captain on 30 August 1688, Fairborne was given command of the fifth-rate HMS Richmond later that month. The fact that his mother had been left without a pension by the old regime is likely to have made Fairborne a supporter of the Glorious Revolution of November 1688. He transferred to the command of the fifth-rate HMS Phoenix in early 1689 and then commanded the third-rate HMS Warspite at the French victory at the Battle of Beachy Head in June 1690 during the Nine Years' War. After the battle the upper decks of the ship were found to be full of Dutch musket balls.

Fairborne served as part of the naval brigade under the Duke of Marlborough at the siege of Cork in September 1690 during the Williamite War in Ireland before commanding the third-rate HMS Elizabeth at the Battle of Barfleur in May 1692. He commanded the third-rate HMS Monck in the fleet under Sir George Rooke, which while in charge of the Smyrna convoy, was scattered by the French at the Battle of Lagos off Cape St. Vincent in June 1693.

Fairborne was given command of the first-rate HMS Victory in 1695 and then transferred to the command of the third-rate HMS Defiance in February 1696 with orders to protect the outward-bound trade in the Downs. He returned to HMS Victory in March 1697 and then transferred to the first-rate HMS London in June 1697 and to the second-rate HMS Albemarle in Autumn 1697.

Fairborne was appointed to the third-rate HMS Torbay in May 1699, but as the ship was not ready, he transferred to the storeship HMS Suffolk in Summer 1699 and then took command of the fourth-rate HMS Tilbury in January 1700 with orders to sail to Newfoundland to clear the coast of pirates. Later in the year he served in the Mediterranean.

== Senior command ==
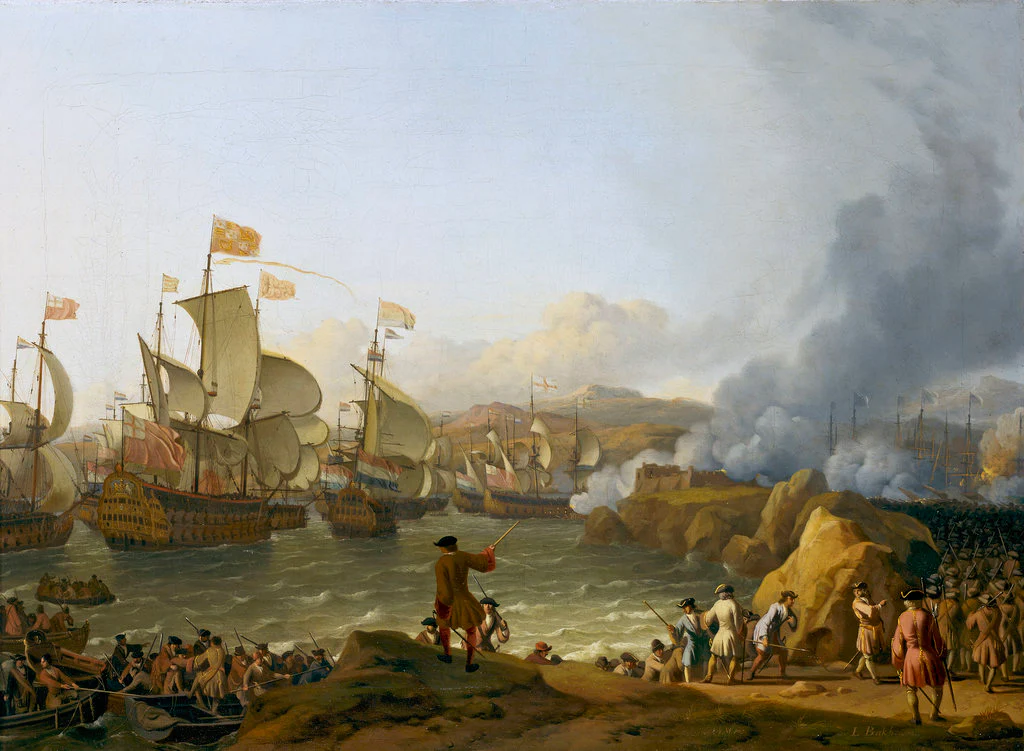
Fairborne commanded the inshore squadron at the Battle of Vigo Bay in October 1702

Promoted to rear-admiral on 30 June 1701, Fairborne was knighted on 3 November 1701. After receiving the Freedom of the City of Cork, he was given command of the inshore squadron, with his flag in the first-rate HMS St George, in a fleet sent to the Mediterranean in Summer 1702 during the War of the Spanish Succession. The fleet was defeated at the Battle of Cádiz in September 1702 but, after Fairborne transferred his flag to the third-rate HMS Essex, the fleet achieved a victory at the Battle of Vigo Bay in October 1702. After the battle he was tasked with assisting Sir Cloudesley Shovell to bring the prizes home delivering a squadron of them safely to Spithead in November 1702. In February 1703, he refused a command in the West Indies and, fearing he had been banned by the council of the Lord High Admiral from holding any future command, challenged Admiral George Churchill to a duel: both officers were subsequently arrested.

Promoted to vice-admiral on 6 May 1703, Fairborne became Third-in-Command, with his flag in the second-rate HMS Association, serving under Shovell in the Mediterranean Fleet with orders to annoy the enemy, assist the allies and protect English trade. The ship was caught in the great storm of December 1703 and, having been torn from her anchor at Gunfleet Sands, was blown across the North Sea to the coast of the Netherlands in dreadful conditions which resulted in the loss of 28 lives from exposure and exhaustion. Nothing was heard from Fairborne for a whole month. After refitting at Gothenburg in Sweden the ship returned to England.

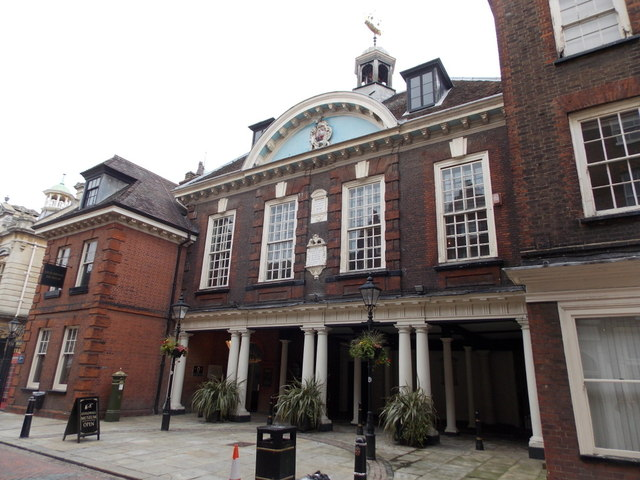
Rochester Guildhall: the lower of two white plaques above the doorway reads "These pavements were given by the Honourable Sir Stafford Fairbourne Anno Domini 1706"

Fairborne was given command of a squadron in the English Channel, with his flag in the third-rate HMS Shrewsbury in 1704. He became Second-in-Command, under Shovell, of the Mediterranean Fleet in Spring 1705 and was present at the siege and capture of Barcelona in October 1705. He was also elected Whig Member of Parliament for Rochester at the 1705 English general election and appointed a member of the council of the Lord High Admiral (an office vested at that time in Prince George of Denmark) in February 1706. That year he financed the laying of a new pavement outside Rochester Guildhall, the commemorative stone for which still remains in place on the front of the building. He was given command of a squadron sent to La Rochelle in May 1706 and took part in the capture of Ostend in June 1706. In each of these actions he was personally involved in dangerous inshore operations and was said to have "courted danger like a mistress".

Fairborne was promoted to full admiral on 7 January 1708 and was returned again for Rochester at the 1708 British general election. He retired as a council member in June 1708, and was promoted to Admiral of the Fleet on 21 December 1708. In Parliament he supported the Whig Ministry voting for the Naturalization of the German Palatines in 1709 but lost his Rochester seat at the general election in 1710 which produced a landslide victory for the Tory party in the wake of the prosecution of Henry Sacheverell which Fairborne had supported. He was offered a post as commissioner for disbanding the marines in 1713 but refused it in the vain hope that he would one day return to senior office in the Admiralty. The Tory Earl of Orford, who became First Lord of the Admiralty, ensured Fairborne never did return to office. In retirement he lived at No. 33 Golden Square in London. He died on 11 November 1742 and was buried in Westminster Abbey.

== Family ==
In June 1694 Fairborne married Dorothy Fane; they had three sons (all of whom predeceased him) and a daughter. Following the death of his first wife, he married Rebecca Paston in October 1708; they had one son. Fairborne became a widower for a second time when his second wife, Rebecca, predeceased him. She was buried at St James, Westminster, on 27 September 1724.

== Sources ==
- Campbell, John (1812). Lives of the British admirals: containing also a new and accurate naval history, from the earliest periods. Vol. 3. C. J. Barrington.
- Charnock, J. (1795). Biographia navalis. Vol. 2. R. Faulder.
- Owen, John Hely (1938). War at sea under Queen Anne, 1702–1708. Cambridge University Press. ISBN 978-1108013383.
- Smith, Charles (1815). The ancient and present state of the county and city of Cork. Vol. 2. John Connor.
- Wyon, Frederick (1876). The History of Great Britain During the Reign of Queen Anne. Vol. 1. Chapman & Hall.

Parliament of England
Preceded by Edward Knatchbull; William Cage	Member of Parliament for Rochester; 1705–1707; With: Admiral Sir Cloudesley Shovell 1705–1707	Succeeded by Parliament of Great Britain
Parliament of Great Britain
Preceded by Parliament of England	Member of Parliament for Rochester; 1707–1710; With: Admiral Sir John Leake 1708–1710	Succeeded by Admiral Sir John Leake; William Cage
