= English ship President (1650) =

History

Commonwealth of England
- Name: President
- Ordered: April 1649
- Builder: Deptford Dockyard
- Launched: 9 April 1650
- Commissioned: 1650
- Honours and awards: Dover 1652; Kentish Knock 1652; Portland 1653; Gabbard 1653; Scheveningen 1653

England
- Name: President
- Acquired: May 1660
- Renamed: Bonaventure in 1660
- Honours and awards: Lowestoffe 1665; Four Days' Battle 1666; Oxfordness 1666; Solebay 1672; Scooneveld 1673; Texel 1673; Beachy Head 1690; Barfleur 1693

Great Britain
- Name: Bonaventure
- Acquired: 1707 Act of Union
- Fate: Broken at Chatham to build a new ship

General characteristics as built
- Class & type: 34-gun Fourth-Rate
- Tons burthen: 462 84/94 bm
- Length: 124 ft 0 in (37.8 m) gundeck; 100 ft 0 in (30.5 m) keel for tonnage
- Beam: 29 ft 6 in (9.0 m)
- Depth of hold: 14 ft 6 in (4.4 m)
- Sail plan: ship-rigged
- Complement: 180 men in 1653
- Armament: at launch; 34 guns; 1666 Establishment; 38 guns

General characteristics after 1663 rebuild
- Class & type: 48-gun fourth-rate ship
- Tons burthen: 514 tons bm
- Length: 124 ft 10 in (38.0 m) gundeck; 102 ft 9 in (31.3 m) keel for tonnage
- Beam: 30 ft 8 in (9.3 m)
- Depth of hold: 12 ft 4 in (3.8 m)
- Sail plan: ship-rigged
- Complement: 180 men in 1666
- Armament: 48/42 guns in 1666; 22 × culverins on wooden trucks (LD); 16 × demi-culverins on wooden trucks (UD); 10 × sakers on wooden trucks (QD); 48 guns in 1677; 22 × culverins on wooden trucks (LD); 20 × 8-pdr sakers on wooden trucks (UD); 6 × sakers on wooden trucks (QD)

General characteristics after 1683 rebuild
- Class & type: 52-gun fourth-rate ship
- Tons burthen: 56413/94 tons bm
- Length: 124 ft 10 in (38.0 m) (gundeck); 102 ft 6 in (31.2 m) keel for tonnage
- Beam: 32 ft 2 in (9.8 m)
- Depth of hold: 12 ft 4 in (3.8 m)
- Sail plan: ship-rigged
- Armament: 52 guns in 1688; 22 × 12-pounders on wooden trucks (LD); 22 x 8-pounders on wooden trucks (UD); 2 × sakers on wooden trucks (QD); 6 x 3-pounders (QD)

General characteristics after 1699 rebuild
- Class & type: 50-gun fourth-rate ship
- Tons burthen: 596 24/94tons bm
- Length: 125 ft 5 in (38.2 m) gundeck; 102 ft 5 in (31.2 m) keel for tonnage
- Beam: 33 ft 1 in (10.1 m)
- Depth of hold: 12 ft 5 in (3.8 m)
- Sail plan: ship-rigged
- Complement: 180 men in 1666
- Armament: 50/44 guns; 20/18 × 12-pounder guns on wooden trucks (LD); 20/18 × 6-pounder guns on wooden trucks (UD); 6/4 × 6-pounder guns on wooden trucks (QD); 2 × 6-pounder guns on wooden trucks (Fc)

General characteristics after 1711 rebuild
- Class & type: 50-gun fourth-rate ship
- Tons burthen: 596 24/94tons bm
- Length: 125 ft 5 in (38.2 m) gundeck; 102 ft 5 in (31.2 m) keel for tonnage
- Beam: 33 ft 1 in (10.1 m)
- Depth of hold: 12 ft 5 in (3.8 m)
- Sail plan: ship-rigged
- Complement: 180 men in 1666
- Armament: 50/44 guns; 20/18 × 12-pounder guns on wooden trucks (LD); 20/18 × 6-pounfer guns on wooden trucks (UD); 6/4 × 6-pounfer guns on wooden trucks (QD); 2 × 6-pounfer guns on wooden trucks (Fc)

General characteristics after 1720-22 rebuild
- Class & type: 50-gun fourth-rate ship
- Tons burthen: 76410/94 tons bm
- Length: 134 ft 2 in (40.9 m) gundeck; 110 ft 4 in (33.6 m) keel for tonnage
- Beam: 36 ft 1 in (11.0 m)
- Depth of hold: 15 ft 2 in (4.6 m)
- Sail plan: ship-rigged
- Complement: 280 men
- Armament: 50/44 guns; 22/20 × 18-pounder guns on wooden trucks (LD); 22/20 × 9-pounder guns on wooden trucks (UD); 4/2 × 6-pounder guns on wooden trucks (QD); 2 × 6-pounder guns on wooden trucks (Fc)

The President was a 34-gun fourth-rate of the English Navy, originally built for the navy of the Commonwealth of England by Peter Pett I at Deptford Dockyard, and launched in 1650. The President was the second English vessel to carry that name, as it had been used for a 26-gun ship, purchased by Parliament in 1645 and sold in 1656, but known as Old President from 1650.

== Construction ==
She was ordered in April 1649 as part of the 1649 Programme to be built at Deptford Dockyard under the guidance of Master Shipwright Peter Pett I. She was launched 9 April 1650. Her dimensions were 124 feet 0 inches (37.8 metres) length on the gundeck with 100 feet 0 inches (30.5 metres) keel length reported for tonnage, breadth of 29 feet 6 inches (9.0 metres), and depth in hold 14 feet 9 inches (4.5 metres). Her builder's measurement tonnage was 46284/94 tons. Her armament when built would be 38 guns of various calibres. Her armament would vary between 38 and 48 guns during her career.

== Commissioned service ==
=== Service with Commonwealth Navy ===
She was commissioned into the Commonwealth Navy under the command of Captain Anthony Young in 1650 for service on the West coast.

==== First Anglo-Dutch War ====
She was in action with the Dutch off the Start on 12 May. The action off the Start led to the Battle of Dover. She was the leader of Captain Young's detachment of three ships on 19 May 1652. This battle is sometimes recorded as the Battle of Goodwin Sands. On 28 September 1652 she participated in the Battle of the Kentish Knock. Later in 1652 she was under the command of Captain Thomas Graves. At the Battle of Portland she was a member of Robert Blake's Fleet of eighty-four ships from 18 to 20 February 1653. This British victory secured control over the English Channel. The Dutch lost eight warships and forty merchant vessels. In 1653 she was under the command of Captain Francis Parker. A few months later she was at the Battle of the Gabbard as part of Blue Squadron, Center Division under the command of Vice-Admiral James Peacock, on 2–3 June 1653. The British were victorious on the first day. When Admiral Tromp attempted to attack again on the 3rd, he withdrew when a squadron of eighteen ships arrived under the command of Robert Blake. This fight was followed by the Battle of Scheveningen where she was a member of Red Squadron, Van Division under the command of Vice-Admiral James Peacock on 31 July 1653. Later she spent the winter of 1653/54 with the east coast colliers.

In 1656 she was under Captain Benjamin Sacheverell until he died later that year then Captain Richard Potter took over.

=== Service after the Restoration in May 1660 ===
After the Restoration in 1660, she was taken into the new Royal Navy, and renamed HMS Bonaventure after a previous ship built in 1621 that had been blown up in 1653. The new Bonaventure was the fifth English vessel to carry that name, as it was first used for a warship built in 1489 (and gone by 1509); other ships had carried that name in 1551 (as Edward Bonaventure), 1567 (as Elizabeth Bonaventure) and 1621. On 11 August 1662 she was under the command of Captain Sir William Berkeley. In early 1663 she was docked at Chatham to be rebuilt. In 1683 she underwent her second rebuilding, relaunching as a 40-gun fourth rate ship of the line. Bonaventure was rebuilt a third time in 1699 at Woolwich Dockyard, relaunching as a fourth rate of between 46 and 54 guns.

=== Chatham 1663 Rebuilding ===
She was rebuilt (and widened) at Chatham Dockyard in 1663 under the guidance of Master Shipwright Sir Phineas Pett. She was launched in late 1663. Her dimensions were 124 feet 10 inches (38.0 metres) gundeck length, with 102 feet 9 inches (31.3 metres) keel length reported for tonnage, breadth 30 feet 8 inches (9.3 metres), depth in hold 12 feet 4 inches (3.8 metres). Her builder's measurement tonnage was 514 tons. Her armament when built was 38 guns of various calibres. Her armament would vary between 38 and 48 guns during her career. By 1677 her armament was changed to 48 (wartime)/ 42 (peacetime) guns consisting of twenty-two culverins (Note: A culverin was a gun of 4,500 pounds with a 5.5-inch bore firing a 17.5-pound shot with a 12-pound powder charge) on the lower deck (LD), sixteen demi-culverins (Note: A demi-culverin was a gun of 3,400 pounds with a four-inch bore firing a 9.5-pound shot with an eight-pound powder charge.) on the upper deck (UD) and ten sakers (Note: A sacar or saker was a gun of 1,400 pounds with a 3.5-inch bore firing a 5.5-pound shot with a 5.5-pound powder charge.) on the quarterdeck (QD). In 1677 the armament would be changed to twenty-two culverins on the lower deck (LD), twenty 8-pounder guns (Note: 8-pounder was a captured Dutch weapon.) on the upper deck (UD) and six sakers on the quarterdeck (QD).

=== Service after rebuild 1663 ===
She was commissioned on 19 November 1663 under the command of Captain Arthur Laughorne. She sailed with Admiral Sir Thomas Allin's squadron to the Mediterranean in 1664. She went aground in a storm at Gibraltar on 3 December 1664, however was salved and repaired at Cadiz, Spain.

==== Second Anglo-Dutch War ====
She participated in the Battle of Lowestoft as a member of Red Squadron, Rear Division under the command of Rear-Admiral Sir William Berkeley, on 3 June 1665. She was at the Battle of Vagen (Bergen, Norway) on 3 August 1665, however, was unable to enter the harbour therefore unable to participate in the action. On 14 June 1665 Captain John Waterworth took command. On 4 June she joined the Four Days' Battle' as a member of Prince Rupert's Squadron, Van division under the command of Vice-Admiral Sir Christopher Myngs. As a member of Blue Squadron, Center Division under the command of Admiral Sir Jeremy Smith, she was at the St James's Day Battle on 25 July 1666.

She sailed to the West Indies in the spring of 1667 with Rear-Admiral Sir John Harman's Squadron. She participated in the Battle of Martinique on 24/25 June 1667. On 2 July 1667 Captain William Hammond took command until he was killed at Surinam on 7 October 1667. Captain John Narborough took over on 30 October 1667.

==== Third Anglo-Dutch War ====
On 9 January 1672 Captain Richard Trevanion took command. She participated in the Battle of Solebay as a member of Blue squadron, Van Division under command of Rear-Admiral Sir John Kempthorne, on 28 May 1673. On 13 June 1672 Captain Henry Killigrew took command. While commanding she partook in the Battle of Schooneveld on 28 May and 4 June 1673. This was followed by the Battle of Texel on 11 August 1673. On 17 August 1673 Captain John Wood took command to escort a convoy to Gibraltar in October 1674. She remained in the Mediterranean until the end of the year when she returned home. In 1682 she was docked at Portsmouth to be rebuilt.

=== Rebuild at Portsmouth 1683 ===
She was rebuilt at Portsmouth in 1683 under the guidance of Master Shipwright Isaac Betts. She was floated out of dock in 1683. Her dimensions after the second rebuild were 102 feet 6 inches (31.2 metres) keel reported for tonnage, breadth 32 feet 2 inches (9.8 metres), depth in hold 12 feet 4 inches (3.8 metres). Her builder's measurement tonnage was 56412/94 bm tons. Her armament was changed to 52 guns, consisting of twenty-two 12-pounder guns on the lower deck, twenty-two 8-pounder guns on the upper deck and two sakers on the quarterdeck. In the 1696 survey she carried only 40 guns consisting of eighteen 12-pounder guns on the lower deck, twenty 6-pounder guns on the upper deck and 2 minions on the quarterdeck.

=== Service after rebuild 1683 ===
She was commissioned on 14 May 1683 under the command of Captain Henry Priestman. She was at the evacuation of Tangiers followed by the evacuation of Sale, Morocco. In 1685, while Captain Priestman was ill, Lieutenant Stafford Fairbourne took command. She was in a boat action at Mamora on 12 June 1685. In 1688 She was under Captain Thomas Hopson with Dartmouth's Fleet in October the partook in Londonderry operations in 1689. In 1690 she was under the command of Captain John Hubbard. She participated in the Battle of Beachy Head on 30 June 1690 as a member of Blue Squadron. This was followed by the Battle of Barfleur from 19 to 24 May 1692 as a member of Red Squadron. In 1896 she sailed to Hudson Bay to recapture Fort York under the command of Captain William Allen. She was in action against the former Mary Rose on 24 October 1696 during which Captain Allen was killed. Captain Vincent Cutter sailed her to Newfoundland in 1697. She was docked at Woolwich for rebuilding in 1699.

=== Rebuilding at Woolwich 1699 ===
She was rebuilt at Woolwich in 1698 under the guidance of Master Shipwright Fisher Harding. She was floated out of dock in 1699. Her dimensions after the third rebuild were 125 feet 5 inches (38.2 metres) on the gundeck with 102 feet 5 inches (31.2 metres) keel length reported for tonnage, breadth 33 feet 1 inch (10.1 metres), and depth in hold 12 feet 5 inches (3.8 metres). Her builder's measurement tonnage was 59624/94 bm tons. Her armament was changed to 50 guns, consisting of twenty 12-pounder guns on the lower deck, twenty 6-pounder guns on the upper deck, six 6-pounder guns on the quarterdeck and two 6-pounder guns on the foc's'le (Fc). Her peacetime armament would remove two guns from the lower deck, the upper deck and the quarterdeck.

=== Service after rebuild 1699 ===
She commissioned in 1701 under the command of Captain Fleetwood Ernes for a voyage to Guinea. She was with Shovel's Squadron in October 1702. In 1703 Captain Edward Rumsey took command for convoys to Newfoundland and the West Indies. During 1704 thru 06 she was in the North Sea followed by Whetstone's squadron in 1707. Captain Philip Boys took over in 1708 and sailed with Baker's squadron on the Dutch coast then sailed in Scottish waters.

== Rebuilding at Chatham in 1711 ==
She was docked in 1711 for her fourth rebuild, which took place at Chatham Dockyard, where she was rebuilt as a 50-gun fourth rate to the 1706 Establishment, relaunching on 19 September 1711. She was renamed HMS Argyll prior to the Jacobite rising of 1715, and on 27 January 1720 she was ordered to be taken to pieces at Woolwich for what was to be her fifth and final rebuild.

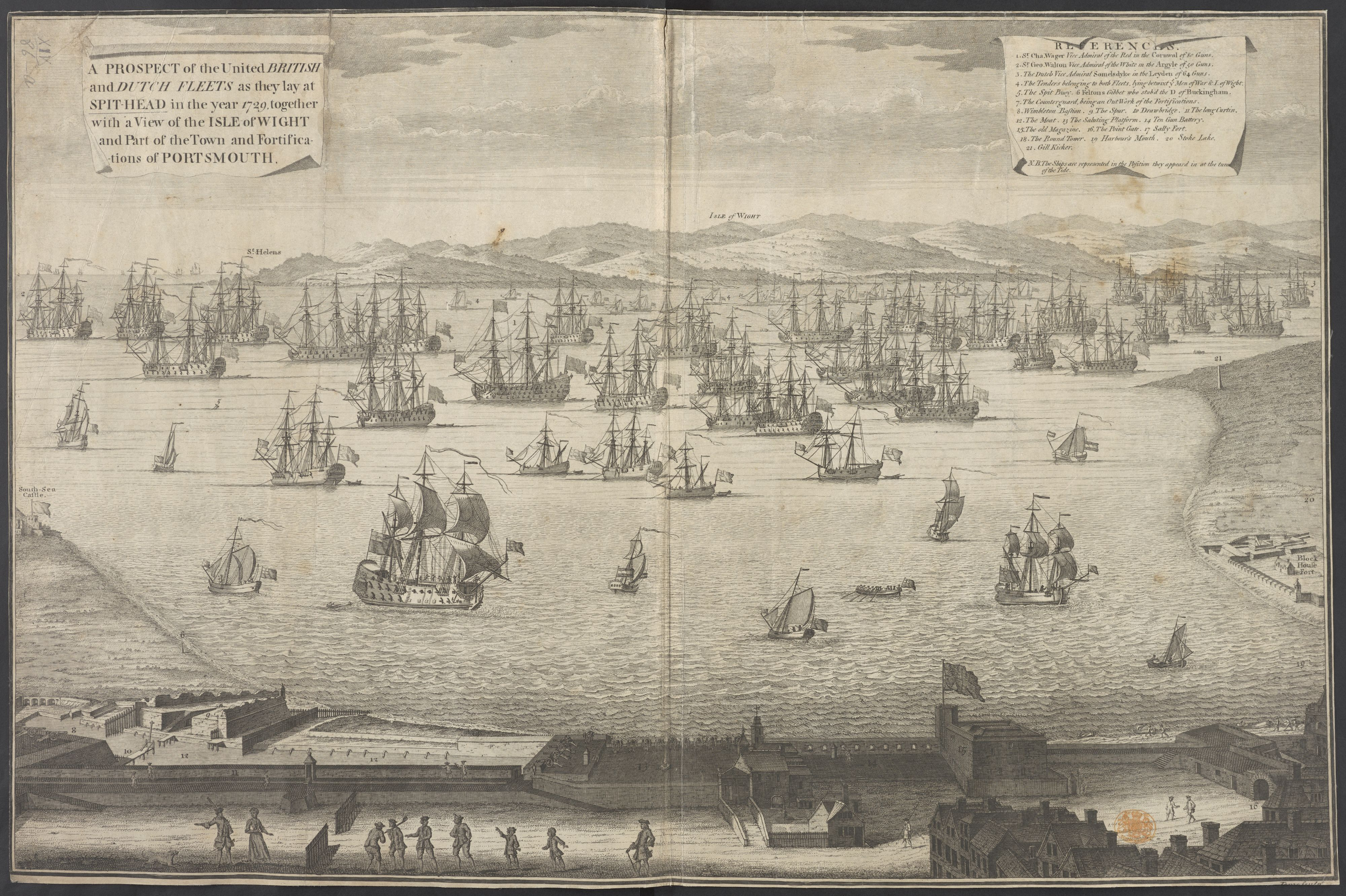
A Prospect of the United British and Dutch Fleets as they lay at Spit-Head in the year 1729, Argyll (position 2) at anchor.

== Rebuilding at Woolwich in 1720-22 ==
She was relaunched as a 50-gun fourth rate to the 1719 Establishment on 5 July 1722, and saw much service in home and Atlantic waters. She was employed on blockade duties during the War of the Austrian Succession, and in 1741 Argyll captured five Spanish coasters, and with the assistance of two other warships cut free five captured British warships that were docked in north-western Spain.

In 1742 Argyll served to escort convoys of East Indiamen from St. Helena to England. In 1745 she returned to Britain by way of escorting a convoy and was paid off in 1746. After the conclusion of the war in 1748, Argyll was towed to Harwich and scuttled as part of a breakwater.
