= Fairborne =

Fairborne may refer to:

- Stafford Fairborne (Royalist), English soldier of the English Civil War
- Palmes Fairborne (1644–1680), English soldier and Governor of Tangier
- Stafford Fairborne (1666–1742), English MP
- Marissa Faireborn, a fictional character from the Transformers series
