= Anthony Cracherode =

British Member of Parliament (1674–1752)

Anthony Cracherode (c. 1674–1752), of Cholderton, Wiltshire, was a British government lawyer and politician who sat in the House of Commons from 1728 to 1734.

Cracherode was probably the son of Anthony Cracherode, who was the second son of Mordaunt Cracherode of Cust Hall, Essex. He was admitted at Inner Temple and called to the bar in 1702.

Cracherode, was appointed chief clerk for Barbados in 1714 on the accession of George I and executed the office by deputy. In May 1715 he was made Treasury solicitor at a salary of £500 p.a. He was active in bringing to trial the rebels of the 1715 Jacobite rebellion. He also proposed rigorous prosecution for libel and spreading false news, as a means of controlling the coffee-house politicians. As solicitor to House of Commons committees, he acted on the impeachments of the Earls of Oxford and Wintoun. He was returned as Member of Parliament for Lostwithiel at a by-election on 29 January 1728. He voted with the Administration in every recorded division. In 1730, he resigned from his post at the Treasury. He did not stand at the 1734 British general election.

Cracherode retired from public life to spend the rest of his life in religious devotion to prepare for a future and happy immortality. He died unmarried on 22 April 1752 aged 72, leaving his estate to his cousin Lieutenant-Colonel Mordaunt Cracherode, father of Clayton Mordaunt Cracherode, the book collector.

Parliament of Great Britain
Preceded by Sir Orlando Bridgeman; Darell Trelawny	Member of Parliament for Lostwithiel; 1729–1734; With: Sir Edward Knatchbull; Edward Walpole 1730	Succeeded by Richard Edgcumbe; Philip Lloyd
