= Sir Edward Knatchbull, 4th Baronet =

English politician

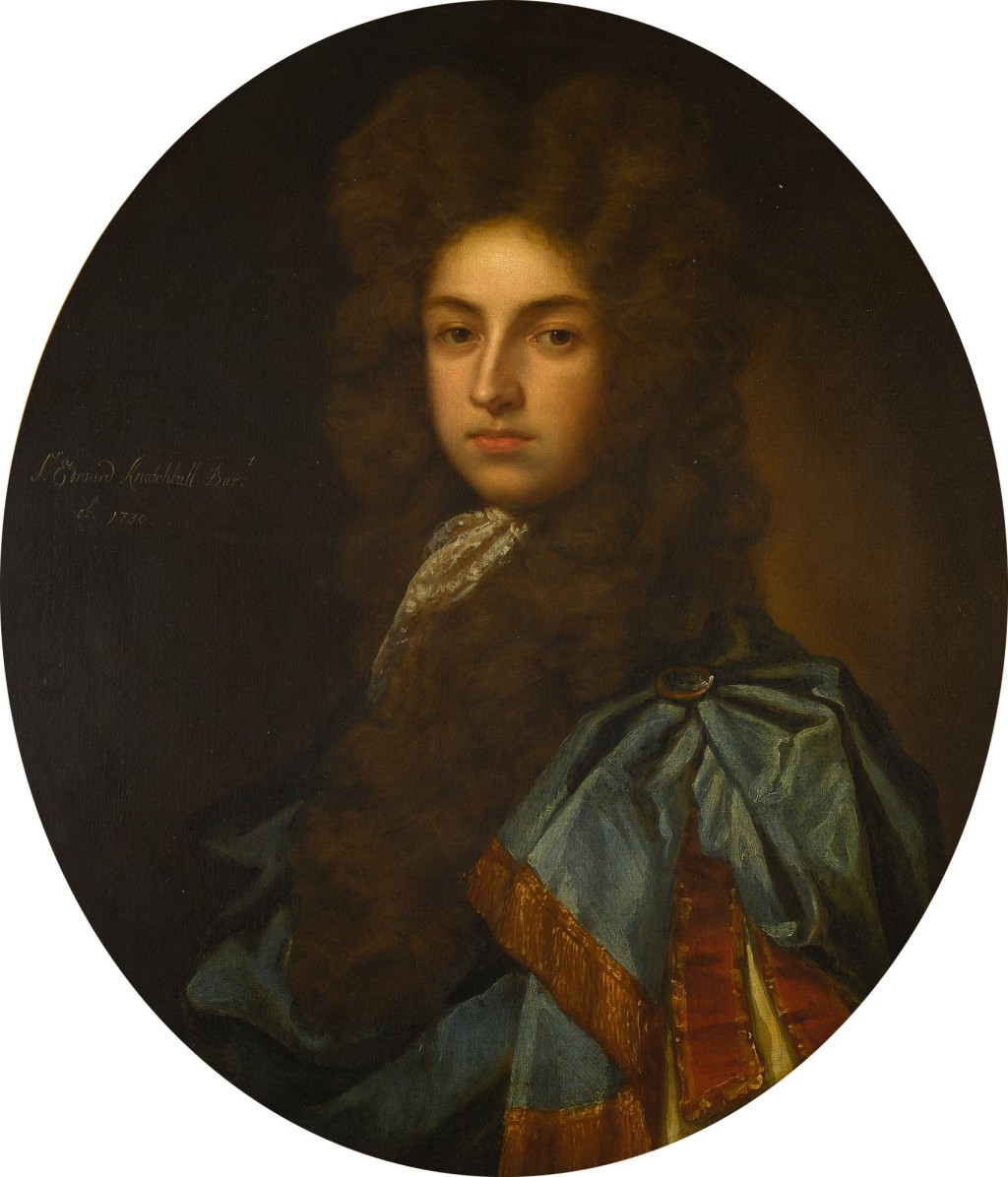
Portrait of Sir Edward Knatchbull, 4th Baronet (1674-1730)

Sir Edward Knatchbull, 4th Baronet (c. 1674 – 3 April 1730) was an English politician who sat in the House of Commons of England from 1702 to 1705 and in the House of Commons of Great Britain variously between 1713 and 1730.

== Biography ==
Knatchbull was the eldest son of Sir Thomas Knatchbull, 3rd Baronet and his wife Mary Dering, daughter of Sir Edward Dering, 2nd Baronet.

In 1702, Knatchbull was elected Member of Parliament for Rochester and held the seat to 1705. In 1712, he succeeded his father in the baronetcy. In 1713, he was elected MP for Kent and represented the constituency until 1715. He was elected MP for Kent again in 1722 and held the seat until 1727. In the following year, he was returned for Lostwithiel, a seat he held until his death on 3 April 1730.

Knatchbull married Alice Wyndham, daughter of Colonel John Wyndham and sister of Thomas Wyndham, 1st Baron Wyndham before 1698. They had eight children, three daughters and five sons. Knatchbull died at Golden Square in Middlesex and was succeeded in the baronetcy by his oldest son Sir Wyndham Knatchbull-Wyndham, 6th Baronet. His second son Edward sat in the Irish House of Commons and became later the 7th Baronet.

Parliament of England
Preceded by William Bokenham; Francis Barrell	Member of Parliament for Rochester; 1702–1705; With: William Cage	Succeeded by Sir Cloudesley Shovell; Sir Stafford Fairborne
Parliament of Great Britain
Preceded by Percival Hart; William Hardres	Member of Parliament for Kent; 1713–1715; With: Percival Hart	Succeeded by Mildmay Fane; William Delaune
Preceded by William Delaune; John Fane	Member of Parliament for Kent; 1722–1727; With: Sir Thomas Twisden	Succeeded by Sir Roger Meredith; Sir Robert Furnese
Preceded by Darell Trelawny; Sir Orlando Bridgeman	Member of Parliament for Lostwithiel; 1728–1730; With: Anthony Cracherode	Succeeded by Edward Walpole; Anthony Cracherode
Baronetage of England
Preceded by Thomas Knatchbull	Baronet (of Mersham Hatch); 1712–1730	Succeeded by Wyndham Knatchbull-Wyndham
