= William Cage (MP for Rochester) =

English Tory politician

William Cage (28 March 1666 – 21 January 1738) was an English Tory politician who sat in the House of Commons of England from 1702 to 1705 and in the House of Commons of Great Britain from 1710 to 1715.

Cage was the son of William Cage, a lawyer from Hollingbourne, Kent, and his wife, Cicely Culpeper, the daughter of Sir Cheney Culpeper and Elizabeth Stede. Following the death of his father in 1676 and his grandfather in 1677, he inherited his grandfather's Milgate Park estate. He was High Sheriff of Kent in 1694 but was fired from the justice's bench in December 1695 and arrested for betraying confidants in February 1696. Nevertheless, he became a deputy lieutenant and a colonel of the militia by 1701.

During the 1701 election, Cage stood for parliament at Rochester but was unsuccessful as a result of a smear campaign involving allegations of disloyalty. However, he was elected Member of Parliament (MP) for Rochester in 1702 and sat until 1705; following his defeat, he was described as a "violent man". He was re-elected for Rochester during a Tory landslide in 1710 and sat until 1715 when he declined to stand.

== Personal life ==
Cage married Catherine before 1690 and had three sons and four daughters. He died at age 71 after a long retirement from politics.

Parliament of England
| Preceded by Francis Barrell; William Bokenham | Member of Parliament for Rochester; 1702–1705; With: Edward Knatchbull | Succeeded by Admiral Sir Cloudesley Shovell; Admiral Sir Stafford Fairborne |
| Preceded by Admiral Sir John Leake; Admiral Sir Stafford Fairborne | Member of Parliament for Rochester; 1710–1715; With: Admiral Sir John Leake | Succeeded by Sir Thomas Palmer, Bt; Admiral Sir John Jennings |
