= HMS Royal James (1675) =

Ship of the line of the Royal Navy

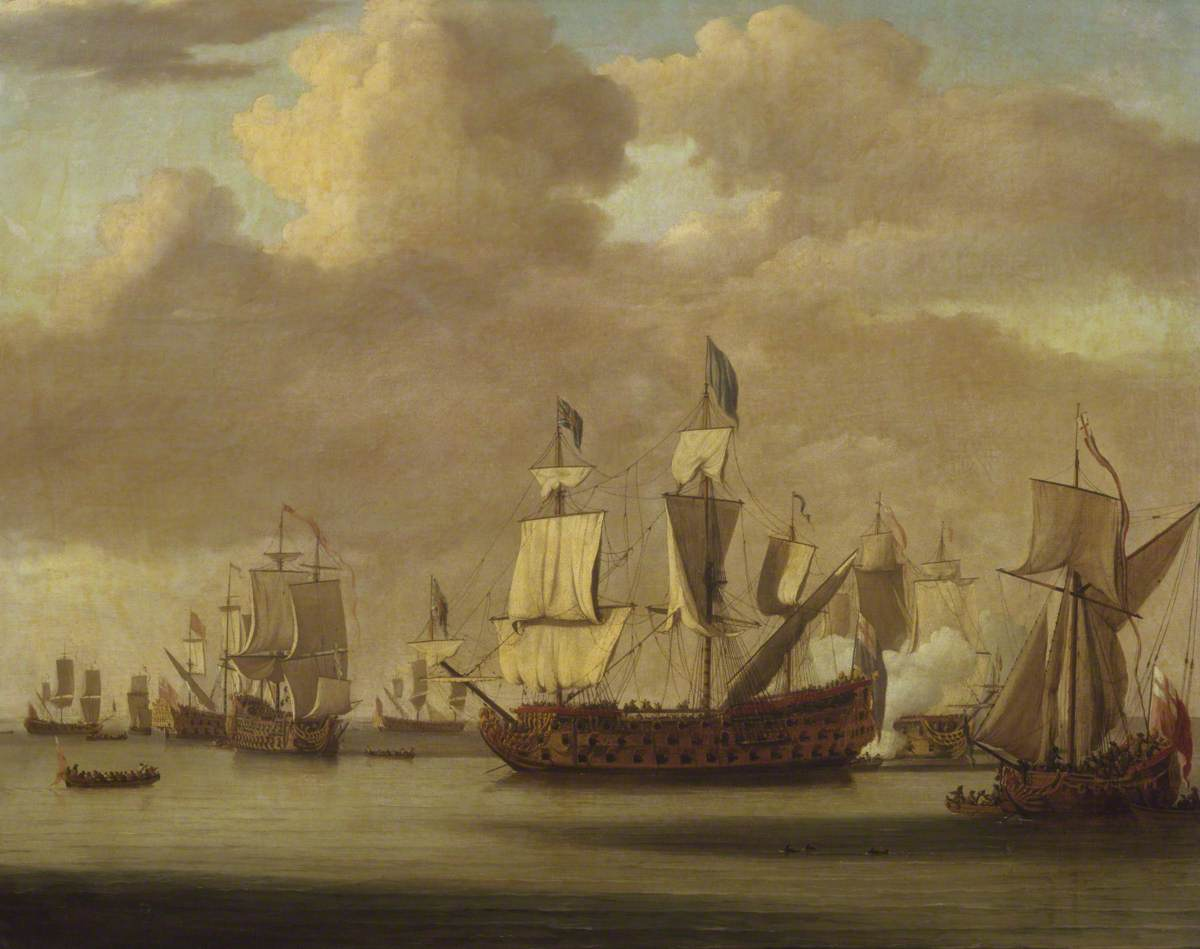
- HMS ‘'Royal James'’, with a Royal Yacht and Other Shipping, by Willem van de Velde

History

Great Britain
- Name: HMS Royal James
- Ordered: 1 April 1673
- Builder: Daniel Furzer, Portsmouth Dockyard
- Launched: 27 June 1675
- Renamed: HMS Victory, 1691
- Fate: Burnt, 1721
- Notes: Participated in: Battle of Barfleur

General characteristics as built
- Class & type: 100-gun first-rate ship of the line
- Tons burthen: 1421 76/94 bm
- Length: 132 ft (40 m) (keel)
- Beam: 45 ft (14 m)
- Depth of hold: 18 ft 4 in (5.59 m)
- Sail plan: Full-rigged ship
- Armament: 100 guns of various weights of shot

General characteristics after 1695 rebuild
- Class & type: 100-gun first-rate ship of the line
- Tons burthen: 1486
- Length: 163 ft 1 in (49.71 m) (gundeck), 135 ft 11¼ in (41.4 m) (keel)
- Beam: 45 ft 4 in (13.82 m)
- Depth of hold: 18 ft 6 in (5.64 m)
- Sail plan: Full-rigged ship
- Armament: 100 guns of various weights of shot

HMS Royal James was a 100-gun first-rate ship of the line of the Royal Navy, designed by Sir Anthony Deane and built by his successor as Master Shipwright at Portsmouth Dockyard, Daniel Furzer, and launched in 1675. She was renamed HMS Victory on 7 March 1691 after the old second rate Victory of 1666 was condemned by survey and taken to pieces. Recommissioned in January 1691 under Captain Edward Stanley, as the flagship of Admiral Sir John Ashby she participated in the Battle of Barfleur on 19 May 1692 – 24 May 1692.

Victory was rebuilt at Chatham Dockyard in 1694–1695. She was briefly renamed Royal George in 1714, after the Hanoverians came to the throne, but resumed the name Victory in 1715. She was partly destroyed by an accidental fire in February 1721 and was broken up, though remained on the navy list until she was ostensibly rebuilt as the new HMS Victory.
