= Battle of Goodwin Sands =

Battle of the Goodwin Sands may refer to:

- Battle of the Narrow Seas, also known as Battle of the Goodwin Sands, 3–4 October 1602, in the Anglo-Spanish War (1585–1604)
- Battle of Dover (1652), also known as Battle of the Goodwin Sands, 19 May 1652, opening action of the First Anglo-Dutch War
