= Mordaunt Cracherode =

British Army general

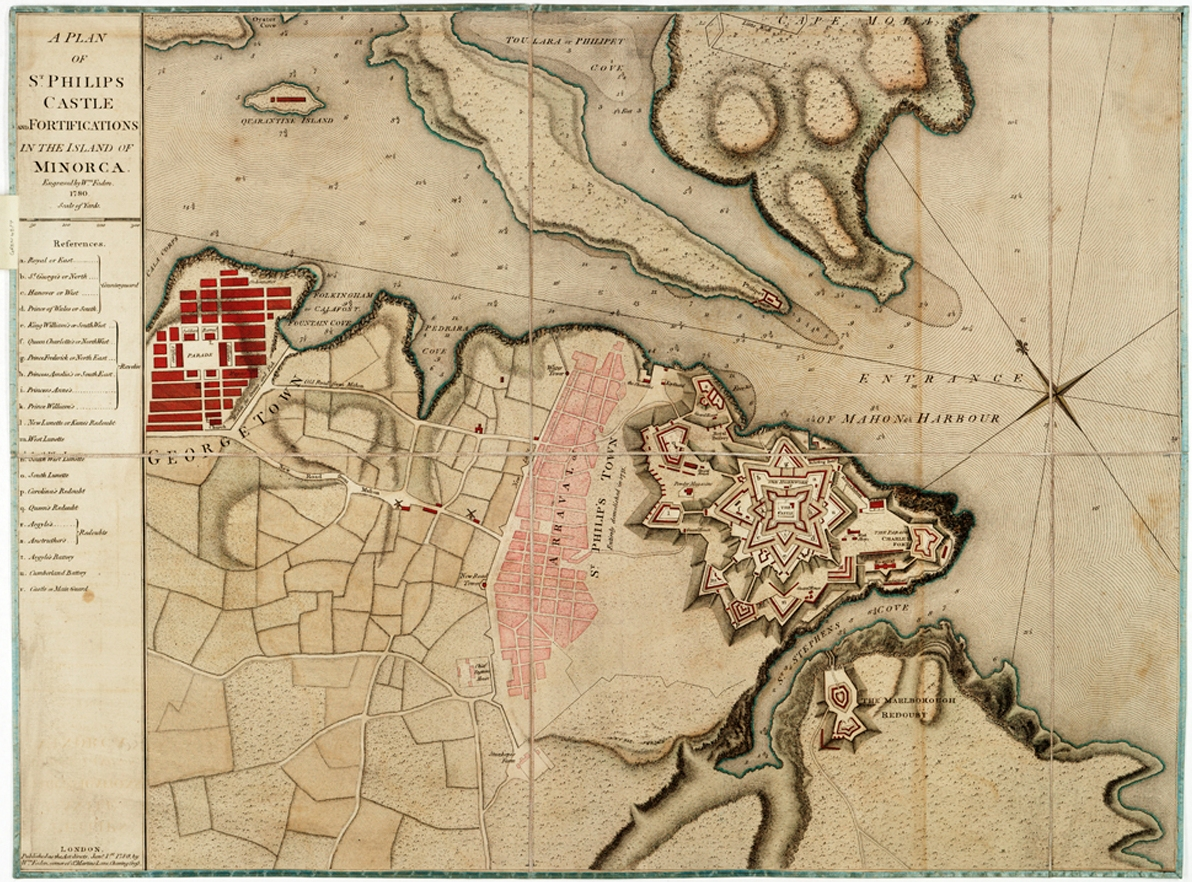
Plan of Fort St. Philip, 1780.

General Mordaunt Cracherode (died 20 June 1773 or 1768 by some accounts) as a lieutenant-colonel was commanding officer of the marines during George Anson's voyage round the world. He held the post of Governor of Landguard Fort until he was appointed to succeed Lieutenant-General Churchill as Lieutenant Governor of Fort St. Philip in 1753.

His son, Clayton Mordaunt Cracherode, was an important benefactor to the British Museum. Despite leaving them his large collections of books, prints and other artworks, his home-made will left his sister Ann his land and residual fortune; she was then 79, and without children or close relations. Clayton's friend, Shute Barrington, Bishop of Durham descended upon her, and after exercising what many later felt was undue influence, persuaded her to make a new will, in which he was named sole executor, with wide power over the disposition of the funds. After bequests, some £30,000 was left for the executor to spend on "such objects of benevolence and liberality as the trustee in his own discretion shall most approve of" - perhaps equating to £2.1 million in modern terms. After Ann died in 1802 the will led to the case of Morice v Bishop of Durham in 1805, an important English trusts law case concerning the beneficiary principle; the trust was held to be invalid.

== See also ==
- List of governors of Menorca
