= HMS Monck (1660) =

Ship of the line of the Royal Navy

History

Great Britain
- Name: HMS Monck
- Builder: Tippetts, Portsmouth
- Launched: 1659
- Fate: Wrecked, 1720

General characteristics as built
- Class & type: 52-gun third rate frigate
- Tons burthen: 703 bm
- Length: 107 ft (32.6 m) (keel)
- Beam: 35 ft (10.7 m)
- Depth of hold: 14 ft 6 in (4.4 m)
- Propulsion: Sails
- Sail plan: Full-rigged ship
- Armament: 52 guns (at launch); 60 guns (1677)

General characteristics after 1702 rebuild
- Class & type: 60-gun fourth rate ship of the line
- Tons burthen: 807 bm
- Length: 137 ft 6.5 in (41.9 m) (gundeck)
- Beam: 36 ft 5.5 in (11.1 m)
- Depth of hold: 14 ft 5.25 in (4.4 m)
- Propulsion: Sails
- Sail plan: Full-rigged ship
- Armament: 60 guns of various weights of shot

HMS Monck was a 52-gun third rate frigate built for the navy of the Commonwealth of England at Portsmouth and launched in 1659. She retained her name after the Restoration of the monarchy in 1660. By 1677 her armament had been increased to 60 guns.

Monck was rebuilt at Greenland South Dockyard, Rotherhithe in 1702 as a 60-gun fourth rate ship of the line. She was wrecked in 1720.
