= Clayton Mordaunt Cracherode =

English book and old master print collector

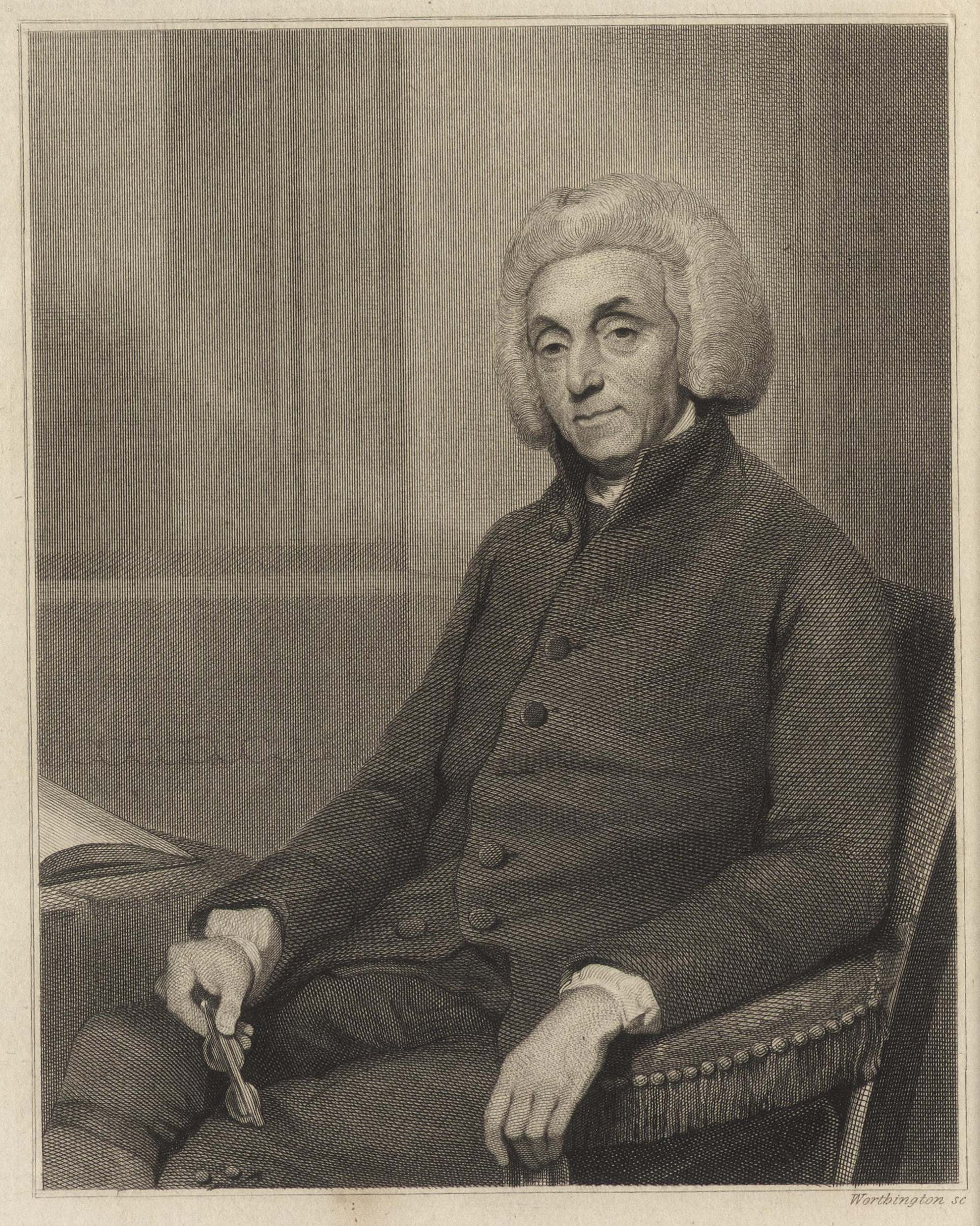
Etching of Charles Mordaunt Cracherode, 1818

Clayton Mordaunt Cracherode (1730–1799) was an English book and old master print collector, and a major benefactor of the British Museum.

== Life ==
His father, Colonel Mordaunt Cracherode, later a general, had command of the marines in George Anson's voyage round the world, and was a wealthy landowner. His mother was Mary, daughter of Thomas Morice, paymaster of the British forces in Portugal, and sister of William Morice, high bailiff of Westminster, who married the Jacobite bishop Francis Atterbury's eldest daughter. Clayton Cracherode was born at Taplow, Buckinghamshire, on 23 June 1730, and educated at Westminster School from 1742, and Christ Church, Oxford, from 1746; "Mr C was perhaps the most amiable man that ever went from Westminster to Christ Church", says his obituary, rather cryptically. He took the degree of B.A. on 4 May 1750, and that of M.A. on 5 April 1763, retaining his Studentship at Christ Church until his death.

Cracherode took Anglican orders, and for some time held the curacy of Binsey, near Oxford, but his church career went no further. On the death of his father in 1773 he inherited a fortune. He was both a Fellow of the Royal Society and a Fellow of the Royal Society of Arts, and a member of the Society of Dilettanti, and in 1784 he was elected a trustee of the British Museum. The scope of his collection including Grolier bindings, engraved gems, coins, and natural history has been assessed by Adina Davis.

He died at Queen Square, Westminster, on 5 April 1799, and was buried on 13 April near his mother, in the east cloister of Westminster Abbey.

According to his obituary in The Gentleman's Magazine (almost the only source for details on his personality and life beyond his collecting), Cracherode had never ridden a horse, which was considered remarkable for someone of his class at the time, and in contrast to his father "The greatest journey of his life was from London to Oxford".

== Bequest ==
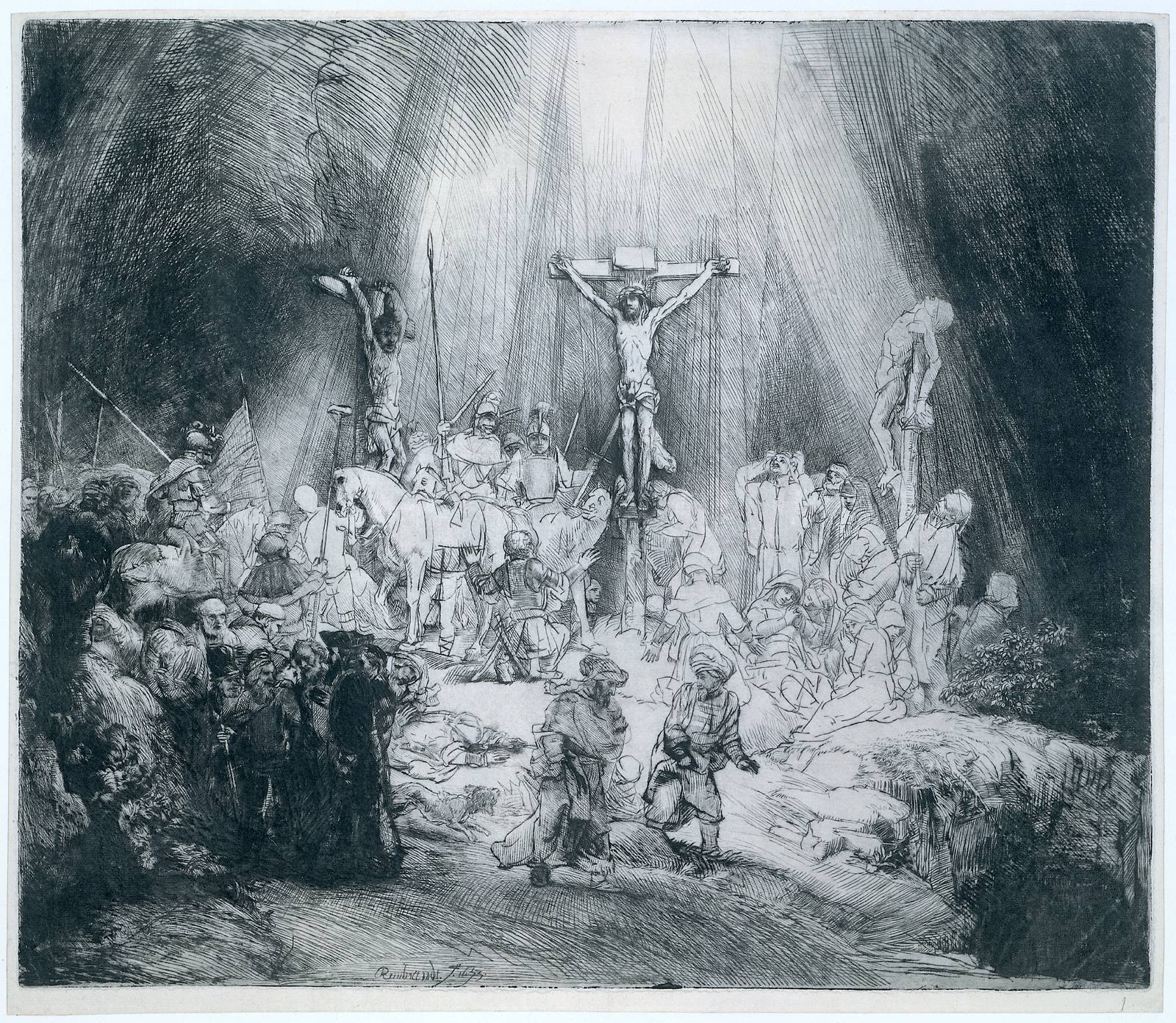
The Three Crosses, drypoint by Rembrandt, 1653, State III of IV. Cracherode owned five impressions of this print, although not the one shown.

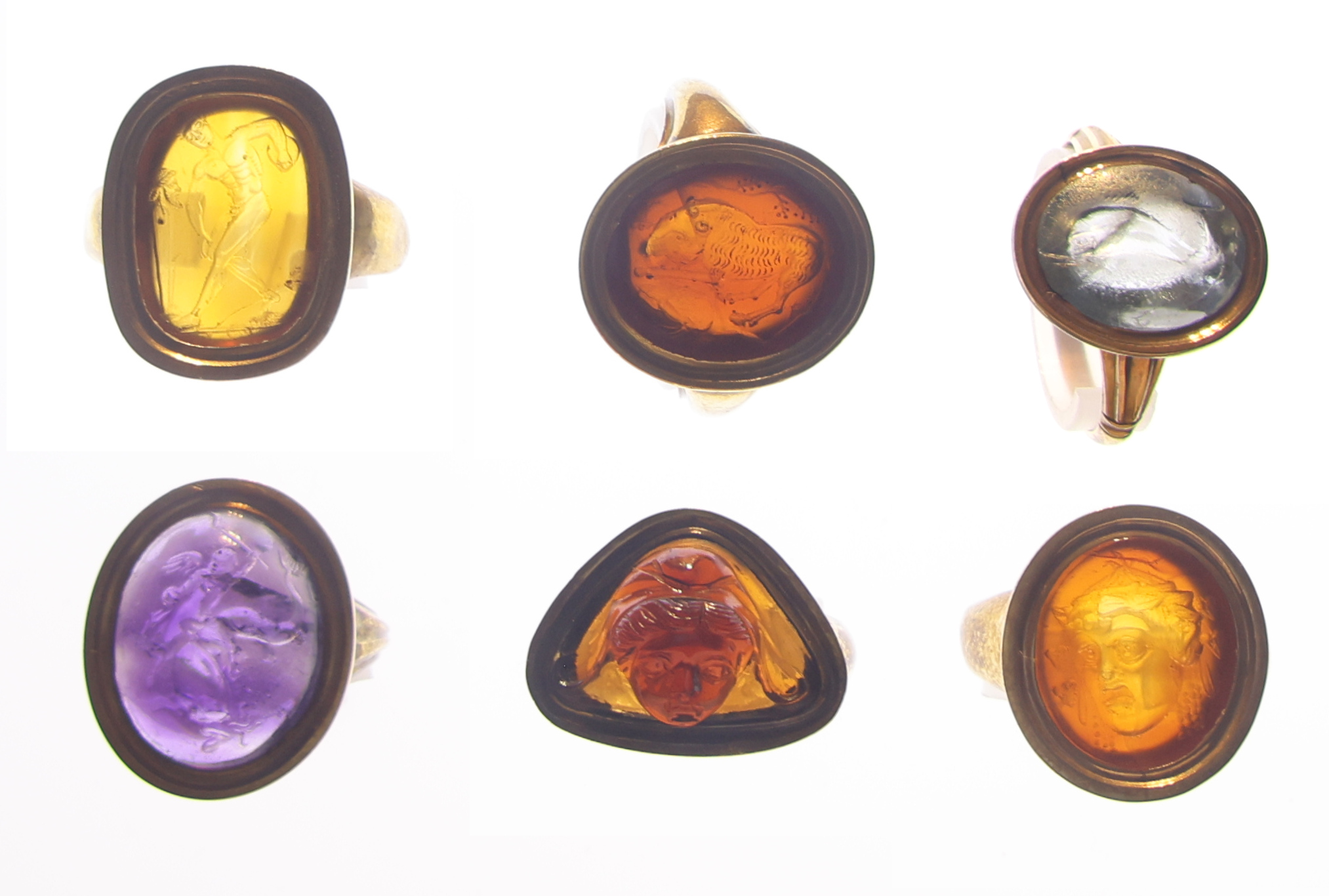
6 engraved gems set in rings that Cracherode donated to the British Museum

Cracherode never married, and his will left the following to the British Museum (with valuation figures at his death): 4,500 volumes (£10,000), seven portfolios of drawings, one hundred portfolios of prints (£5,000 with the drawings), coins and medals (£6,000), engraved gems (£2,000), and shells and minerals (£500). Only two books, the Complutensian Polyglot, and the editio princeps of Homer which formerly belonged to De Thou, were excepted. The former he gave to Shute Barrington, Bishop of Durham, and the latter to Cyril Jackson; these volumes ultimately came to the national collection. His collection of prints included superb examples of Rembrandt, Dürer, and especially Italian printmakers, and is one of the foundations of the British Museum's collection, although since they were not catalogued until later (and after a serious series of thefts in 1806), in many cases his prints cannot be specifically identified. He shared the taste of his age for portrait prints. He was "the second great benefactor of the collection" (after Sir Hans Sloane).

Despite these large bequests, his home-made will left his sister Ann his land and residual fortune; she was then 79, and without children or close relations. Clayton's friend Bishop Barrington descended upon her, and after exercising what many later felt was undue influence, persuaded her to make a new will, in which he was named sole executor, with wide power over the disposition of the funds. Ann died in 1802 and after specific bequests of over £33,000, some £30,000 was left for the executor to spend on "such objects of benevolence and liberality as the trustee in his own discretion shall most approve of" - perhaps equating to £2.1 million in modern terms. The will generated Morice v Bishop of Durham in 1805, an important English trusts law case concerning the beneficiary principle, in which the trust the will purported to create was held to be invalid.
