= List of designations under the Protection of Wrecks Act =

Protected wreck sites in UK waters

This is a list of all sites designated under the Protection of Wrecks Act 1973. The designated sites are shown on charts and notified to mariners. Historic England (formerly English Heritage) provides administration of the arrangements under the Act in England and publishes information on each site. In May 2011, it launched an online searchable database of all protected wreck sites in English territorial waters, the National Heritage List for England, which includes the location co-ordinates, designation list entry description and brief historical details for each site. The administration of designated historic wrecks in Scotland is managed by Historic Environment Scotland, and in Wales by Cadw.

== List of designations under section 1 of the Protection of Wrecks Act (1973) ==
Name	Designated ^{[A]}		Location	Year wrecked	Authority ^{[B]}	National Heritage List for England / Cadw Number
Name	First	Current	Location	Year wrecked	Authority ^{[B]}	National Heritage List for England / Cadw Number
Cattewater Wreck	1973 ^{[A1]}	1973	Plymouth	1530	H.E. ^{[B1]}	1000065
Mary Rose	1974 ^{[A2]}	1974	Portsmouth	1545	H.E. ^{[B1]}	1000075
Grace Dieu	1974 ^{[A3]}	2016	River Hamble	1436	H.E. ^{[B1]}	1000061
VOC Amsterdam	1974 ^{[A4]}	1974	Hastings	1749	H.E. ^{[B1]}	1000055
Royal Yacht Mary	1974 ^{[A5]}	1974	The Skerries, Anglesey	1675	Cadw ^{[B2]}	DW3
HMS Assurance/HMS Pomone	1974 ^{[A6]}	1998 ^{[A6]}	The Needles	1753^{[C1]},1811	H.E. ^{[B1]}	1000087
HMS Dartmouth	1974 ^{[A7]}	1992 ^{[A7]}	Sound of Mull	1690	H.E.S. ^{[B3]}	n.a.
HMS Anne	1974 ^{[A8]}	2009 ^{[A8]}	Pett Level	1690	H.E. ^{[B1]}	1000060
Tearing Ledge Wreck	1975 ^{[A9]}	1975	Scillies	1707? ^{[C2]}	H.E. ^{[B1]}	1000063
Rill Cove Wreck	1976 ^{[A11]}	1976	The Lizard	1616? ^{[C3]}	H.E. ^{[B1]}	1000046
South Edinburgh Channel Wreck	1977 ^{[A13]}	1977	Thames Estuary	late 18th century	H.E. ^{[B1]}	1000079
Church Rocks Wreck	1977 ^{[A14]}	1977	Teignmouth	18th century	H.E. ^{[B1]}	1000064
Pwll Fanog Wreck	1978 ^{[A15]}	1979 ^{[A15]}	Menai Strait	Medieval	Cadw ^{[B2]}	DW2
Moor Sand Site	1978 ^{[A16]}	1978	Salcombe	Middle Bronze Age	H.E. ^{[B1]}	1000050
Coronation (Offshore)	1978 ^{[A17]}	1978	Penlee Point, Rame	1691 ^{[C4]}	H.E. ^{[B1]}	1000069
Langdon Bay Wreck	1978 ^{[A18]}	1978	Dover	Middle Bronze Age	H.E. ^{[B1]}	1000059
Kennemerland	1978 ^{[A19]}	1978	Out Skerries	1664	H.S. ^{[B3]}	n.a.
Tal-Y-Bont Wreck	1979 ^{[A20]}	1989 ^{[A20]}	Cardigan Bay	1677	Cadw ^{[B2]}	DW1
HMS Stirling Castle	1980 ^{[A21]}	2004 ^{[A21]}	Goodwin Sands	1703	H.E. ^{[B1]}	1000056
HMS Invincible	1980 ^{[A22]}	1980	East Solent	1758	H.E. ^{[B1]}	1000052
Bartholomew Ledges Wreck	1980 ^{[A23]}	2006 ^{[A23]}	Scillies	1597? ^{[C5]}	H.E. ^{[B1]}	1000066
HMS Restoration	1981 ^{[A24]}	2004 ^{[A24]}	Goodwin Sands	1703	H.E. ^{[B1]}	1000057
HMS Northumberland	1981 ^{[A25]}	2004 ^{[A25]}	Goodwin Sands	1703	H.E. ^{[B1]}	1000058
St Anthony	1982 ^{[A26]}	2006 ^{[A26]}	Mount's Bay	1527	H.E. ^{[B1]}	1000067
HMS Schiedam	1982 ^{[A27]}	1982	Gunwalloe Cove	1684	H.E. ^{[B1]}	1000049
Yarmouth Roads Wreck	1984 ^{[A29]}	1985 ^{[A29]}	Yarmouth, Isle of Wight	1567?	H.E. ^{[B1]}	1000044
Studland Bay Wreck	1984 ^{[A30]}	1998 ^{[A30]}	Poole	C 1520	H.E. ^{[B1]}	1000045
Admiral Gardner	1985 ^{[A31]}	2004 ^{[A31]}	Goodwin Sands	1809	H.E. ^{[B1]}	1000062
Hazardous	1986 ^{[A32]}	2022 ^{[A32]}	Bracklesham Bay	1706	H.E. ^{[B1]}	1000048
Coronation (Inshore)	1989 ^{[A33]}	1989	Penlee Point, Rame	1691 ^{[C4]}	H.E. ^{[B1]}	1000070
Iona II	1990 ^{[A34]}	2006 ^{[A34]}	Lundy	1864	H.E. ^{[B1]}	1000051
Gull Rock Wreck	1990 ^{[A35]}	1990	Lundy	15th/16th century	H.E. ^{[B1]}	1000053
Wrangles Palais	1990 ^{[A36]}	1991 ^{[A36]}	Out Skerries	1687	H.E.S. ^{[B3]}	n.a.
Erme Estuary Wreck	1991 ^{[A37]}	1991	Erme Estuary	16th to 18th century	H.E. ^{[B1]}	1000071
Smalls Reef Wreck	1991 ^{[A38]}	1995 ^{[A38]}	Smalls Reef	C 1100	Cadw ^{[B2]}	DW4
Duart Point Wreck	1992 ^{[A39]}	1992	Sound of Mull	1653	H.E.S. ^{[B3]}	n.a.
Girona	1993 ^{[A40]}	1993	Lacada Point	1588	N.I. E.H.S. ^{[B4]}	n.a.
HMS Royal Anne Galley	1993 ^{[A41]}	2006 ^{[A41]}	The Lizard	1721	H.E. ^{[B1]}	1000068
Erme Ingot Site	1993 ^{[A42]}	1993	Erme Estuary	Unknown, Bronze Age or later	H.E. ^{[B1]}	1000054
Dunwich Bank Wreck	1994 ^{[A43]}	2004 ^{[A43]}	Dunwich	16th century	H.E. ^{[B1]}	1000073
Resurgam	1996 ^{[A44]}	1996	Rhyl	1880	Cadw ^{[B2]}	DW5
Hanover	1997 ^{[A45]}	2022 ^{[A45]}	Hanover Cove, Cornwall	1763	H.E. ^{[B1]}	1000072
Seaton Carew Wreck	1997 ^{[A46]}	1997	Seaton Carew	19th century	H.E. ^{[B1]}	1000077
Salcombe Cannon Wreck	1997 ^{[A47]}	1997	Salcombe	c 1640	H.E. ^{[B1]}	1000074
HM Submarine A1	1998 ^{[A48]}	2004 ^{[A48]}	Bracklesham Bay	1911	H.E. ^{[B1]}	1000043
Burntisland Wreck	1999 ^{[A49]}	1999	Firth of Forth	1633	H.E.S. ^{[B3]}	n.a.
Loe Bar Wreck	1999 ^{[A50]}	1999	Mount's Bay	17th century	H.E. ^{[B1]}	1000076
Mingary Castle Wreck	2000 ^{[A51]}	2000	Sound of Mull	17th century	H.E.S. ^{[B3]}	n.a.
Kinlochbervie Wreck	2001 ^{[A52]}	2001	Kinlochbervie	Early 17th century	H.E.S. ^{[B3]}	n.a.
HMS Colossus (Stern Section)	2001 ^{[A53]}	2017	Scillies	1798	H.E. ^{[B1]}	1000078
HMS Campania	2001 ^{[A54]}	2001	Firth of Forth	November 1918	H.E.S. ^{[B3]}	n.a.
The Diamond? ^{[C6]}	2002 ^{[A55]}	2002	Cardigan Bay	19th century	Cadw ^{[B2]}	DW6
USS Bonhomme Richard?	2002 ^{[A56]}	2002	Filey Bay	1779	H.E. ^{[B1]}	1000080
Swash Channel Wreck	2004 ^{[A57]}	2004	Poole	Early 17th century	H.E. ^{[B1]}	1000082
Holland V	2005 ^{[A58]}	2005	Sussex Coast	1912	H.E. ^{[B1]}	1000081
West Bay Wreck	2005 ^{[A59]}	2005	West Bay	17th/18th century	H.E. ^{[B1]}	1000083
HMS Resolution?	2006 ^{[A60]}	2006	Norman's Bay	1703	H.E. ^{[B1]}	1000084
Rooswijk	2007 ^{[A61]}	2018	Goodwin Sands	1739	H.E. ^{[B1]}	1000085
Wheel Wreck	2007 ^{[A62]}	2007	Scillies	19th century	H.E. ^{[B1]}	1000086
HMS London	2007 ^{[A63]}	2012	Thames Estuary	1665	H.E. ^{[B1]}	1000088
Goodwins & Downs 8	2012 ^{[A64]}	2012	Goodwins and Downs	1650-1750	H.E. ^{[B1]}	1401982
Unknown Wreck off Thorness Bay	2013 ^{[A65]}	2013	Isle of Wight	19th century	H.E. ^{[B1]}	1402103
HMS Association	2014 ^{[A66]}	2014	Isles of Scilly	1707	H.E. ^{[B1]}	1419276
HMS A3	2016 ^{[A67]}	2016	Portland Bill	1912	H.E. ^{[B1]}	1422537
SM U-8	2016 ^{[A68]}	2016	Folkestone	1915	H.E. ^{[B1]}	1430265
Holigost	2016 ^{[A69]}	2016	River Hamble	1422	H.E. ^{[B1]}	1000061
HMT Arfon	2016 ^{[A70]}	2016	St Alban's Head, Dorset	1917	H.E. ^{[B1]}	1432595
Chesil Beach cannon	2017 ^{[A71]}	2017	Chesil Beach	17th/18th century	H.E. ^{[B1]}	1433972
UC-70	2017 ^{[A72]}	2017	Whitby	1918	H.E. ^{[B1]}	1446103
Eastbourne wreck site	2019 ^{[A73]}	2019	Eastbourne	1672	H.E. ^{[B1]}	1464317
Shingles Bank wreck NW68	2022 ^{[A74]}	2022	Isle of Wight	17th century	H.E. ^{[B1]}	1469106
Shingles Bank wreck NW96	2022 ^{[A75]}	2022	Isle of Wight	15th/16th century	H.E. ^{[B1]}	1469107
Mortar wreck	2022 ^{[A76]}	2022	Poole, Dorset	13th century	H.E. ^{[B1]}	1474570

=== De-designations (Section 1) ===
Name	Designated ^{[A]}	Revoked ^{[A]}	Location	Year wrecked	Authority ^{[B]}
Rhinns of Islay Wreck	1976 ^{[A12]}	revoked 1984 ^{[A12]}	Islay	18th/19th century	H.E.S. ^{[B3]}
Brighton Marina Wreck	1983 ^{[A28]}	revoked 2017 ^{[A28]}	Brighton	16th century	H.E. ^{[B1]}

== List of designations under section 2 of the Protection of Wrecks Act (1973) ==
Section 2 of the act designates wrecks categorised as dangerous.

Name	Designated ^{[D]}		Location	Year wrecked	Authority ^{[B]}
Name	First	Current	Location	Year wrecked	Authority ^{[B]}
SS Richard Montgomery	1973 ^{[D1]}	1973	Thames Estuary	1944	MCA ^{[B5]}
SS Castilian	1997 ^{[D3]}	1997	Anglesey	1943	MCA ^{[B5]}

=== De-designations (Section 2) ===
Name	Designated ^{[D]}	Revoked ^{[D]}	Location	Year wrecked	Authority ^{[B]}
MV Braer	1993 ^{[D2]}	revoked 1994 ^{[D2]}	Shetland Islands	1993	MCA ^{[B5]}

== Notes and references ==
=== Notes on Section 1 designations ===
^{A} References are to the designation order and explanatory note. All statutory instruments since 1987 are available on-line from the Office of Public Sector Information. A concatenation of designation orders including those made between 1973 and 1987 is available on the UNESCO law database site
^{A1} Cattewater: first wrecksite to be designated on 5 September 1973
^{A2} Mary Rose: designated 5 February 1974
^{A3} Grace Dieu: designated 5 February 1974, redesignated 21 July 2016:-

Statutory Instrument 2016 No. 685 Statutory Instrument 2016 no. 685

^{A4} Amsterdam: designated 5 February 1974
^{A5} Royal Yacht Mary: designated 5 February 1974
^{A6} HMS Assurance and HMS Pomone, Needles Wrecksite: first designated 11 April 1974, revised 8 July 1997:-

amended 29 July 1998:-
Statutory Instrument 1998 No. 1650 The Protection of Wrecks (Designation No. 1) Order 1998 (Coming into force 29 July 1998)

^{A7} HMS Dartmouth: first designated 11 April 1974, the original designation was revoked after excavation and recovery of finds. The site was redesignated on 25 June 1992:-
^{A8} HMS Anne: first designated 20 June 1974, redesignated 23 March 1992 and 2 Sep 2009:-

Statutory Instrument 1992 No. 347 Statutory Instrument 1992 no. 347
Statutory Instrument 2009 No. 2394 Statutory Instrument 2009 no. 2394

^{A9} Tearing Ledge: designated 13 March 1975
^{A10} HMS Colossus: designated 12 May 1975, revoked 1984, after it was believed that all material had been recovered, but note that the stern was discovered later at a different position and has been separately designated (designated site number 53)
^{A11} Rill Cove Wreck: designated 15 March 1976
^{A12} Rhinns of Islay: designated 1 June 1976; revoked 1984, after determination that the site is the location of multiple wrecks, and there was no longer any wreck left worth protecting.
^{A13} South Edinburgh Channel Wreck: designated 27 May 1977
^{A14} Church Rocks Wreck: designated 12 August 1977
^{A15} Pwll Fanog Wreck: first designated 14 February 1978, redesignated 19 January 1979
^{A16} Moor Sands: designated 8 March 1978
^{A17} Coronation (No 1): The offshore site was designated 31 March 1978
^{A18} Langdon Bay: designated 26 May 1978
^{A19} Kennemerland: designated 1 June 1978
^{A20} Tal-Y-Bont wreck: first designated 12 January 1979, redesignated 28 September 1989:-
^{A21} Stirling Castle: first designated 6 June 1980. Amended, along with other wrecks on the Goodwin Sands 5 October 2004:-

"Statutory Instrument 2004 No. 2395". Office of Public Sector Information. Explanatory note to order 2004 No. 2395

^{A22} Invincible: designated 30 September 1980
^{A23} Bartholomew Ledges: first designated 3 October 1980. Amended 2006:-
^{A24} Restoration: first designated, along with other wrecks on the Goodwin Sands, 7 July 1981, amended 8 December 1989

"Statutory Instrument 1989 No. 2089". Office of Public Sector Information.
amended 5 October 2004:-
"Statutory Instrument 2004 No. 2395". Office of Public Sector Information. Explanatory note to order 2004 No. 2395

^{A25} Northumberland: first designated, along with other wrecks on the Goodwin Sands, 7 July 1981 (S.I. 1981/827), amended 8 December 1989

"Statutory Instrument 1989 No. 2089". Office of Public Sector Information.
amended 5 October 2004:-
"Statutory Instrument 2004 No. 2395". Office of Public Sector Information. Explanatory note to order 2004 No. 2395

^{A26} St Anthony: first designated 15 February 1982, amended 21 September 2006:-
^{A27} Schiedam: designated 15 February 1982
^{A28} Brighton Marina: designated 18 October 1983, revoked 18 August 2017. The designation was deemed no longer appropriate because recent investigations indicated that the protected area only contained a debris trail from a wreck site outside the protected area, and that the debris trail was no longer present.

Statutory Instrument 1983 No. 1400 Statutory Instrument 1983 no. 1400
Statutory Instrument 2017 No. 773 Statutory Instrument 2017 no. 773

^{A29} Yarmouth Roads: first designated 11 April 1984, amended 1 January 1985
^{A30} Studland Bay: first designated 27 November 1984, amended 14 December 1988:-

"Statutory Instrument 1988 No. 2137". Office of Public Sector Information.
amended 10 August 1998

^{A31} Admiral Gardner: first designated 3 June 1985, however the designation was challenged on the grounds that it lay outside the UK's 3 mile limit.

Following the extension of the UK's territorial waters to 12 miles, the wrecksite was redesignated 3 January 1990
"Statutory Instrument No. 2295". Office of Public Sector Information.
and amended 5 October 2004:-
"Statutory Instrument 2004 No. 2395". Office of Public Sector Information. Explanatory note to order 2004 No. 2395

^{A32} 22 September Hazardous: first designated 1986 amended 18 March 1988 and redesignated 18 August 2017. Coordinates amended 6 June 2022:-

"Statutory Instrument 1988 No. 287". Office of Public Sector Information.
Statutory Instrument 2017 No. 773 Statutory Instrument 2017 no. 773
Statutory Instrument 2022 No. 535 Statutory Instrument 2022 no. 535

^{A33} Coronation (no. 2): designated 3 January 1989:-

"Statutory Instrument 1988 No. 2138". Office of Public Sector Information.

^{A34} : Iona II: first designated 3 January 1990:-

"Statutory Instrument 1989 No. 2294". Office of Public Sector Information.
amended 7 June 2006:-
"Statutory Instrument 2006 No. 1468". Office of Public Sector Information. Explanatory note to order 2006 No. 1468
The first attempt at amendment in 2006, Statutory Instrument 2006 No. 1340 was incorrect and revoked

^{A35} Gull Rock: designated 14 March 1990:-
^{A36} Wrangles Palais: first designated 18 August 1990:-

"Statutory Instrument 1990 No. 1694". Office of Public Sector Information.
amended 10 January 1991:-

^{A37} Erme Estuary: designated 3 May 1991:-

"Statutory Instrument 1991 No. 1110". Office of Public Sector Information.

^{A38} Smalls Reef: first designated 5 December 1991:-

amended 9 October 1995:-
"Statutory Instrument 1995 No. 2654". Office of Public Sector Information.

^{A39} Duart Point: designated 15 May 1992
^{A40} Girona: designated 22 April 1993

"Statutory Instrument 1993 No. 976". Office of Public Sector Information.

^{A41} Royal Anne Galley: first designated 11 November 1993

amended 7 June 2006
"Statutory Instrument 2006 No. 1470". Office of Public Sector Information.
The first attempt at amendment in 2006, Statutory Instrument 2006 No. 1342 was incorrect and revoked

^{A42} Erme Ingot: designated 26 November 1993
^{A43} Dunwich Bank: first designated 14 July 1994

"Statutory Instrument 1994 No. 1842". Office of Public Sector Information.
amended 5 October 2004

^{A44} Resurgam: designated 4 July 1996

"Statutory Instrument 1996 No. 1741". Office of Public Sector Information.

^{A45} Hanover: designated 19 July 1997, revoked and redesignated 2 June 2022 to amend coordinates

Statutory Instrument 1997 No. 1718 Statutory Instrument 1997 no. 1718
Statutory Instrument 2022 No. 535 Statutory Instrument 2022 no. 535

^{A46} Seaton Carew: designated 8 August 1997

"Statutory Instrument 1997 No. 1717". Office of Public Sector Information.

^{A47} Salcombe Cannon: designated 24 October 1997
^{A48} HMS A1: first designated 26 November 1998

"Statutory Instrument 1998 No. 2708". Office of Public Sector Information.
amended 5 October 2004

^{A49} Burntisland: designated 22 February 1999

"Statutory Instrument 1999 No. 186". Office of Public Sector Information.

^{A50} Loe Bar: designated 14 June 1999
^{A51} Mingary Castle: designated 19 August 2000

"Scottish Statutory Instrument 2000 No. 287". Office of Public Sector Information.

^{A52} Kinlochbervie: designated 29 June 2001
^{A53} Colossus (Stern): designated 4 July 2001, redesignated 18 August 2017, revoked and redesignated 6 September 2017 to amend coordinates

"Statutory Instrument 2001 No. 2403". Office of Public Sector Information.
Statutory Instrument 2017 No. 773 Statutory Instrument 2017 no. 773
Statutory Instrument 2017 No. 872 Statutory Instrument 2017 no. 872

^{A54} HMS Campania: designated 1 December 2001
^{A55} The Diamond: designated 2 April 2002, the first such designation under devolved powers by the National Assembly for Wales
^{A56} Bonhomme Richard: designated 18 July 2002

"Statutory Instrument 2002 No. 1858". Office of Public Sector Information.

^{A57} Swash Channel: designated 10 December 2004
^{A58} Holland V: designated 4 January 2005

"Statutory Instrument 2004 No. 3249". Office of Public Sector Information.

^{A59} West Bay: designated 19 July 2005
^{A60} Resolution: designated 14 June 2006

"Statutory Instrument 2006 No. 1392". Office of Public Sector Information.

^{A61} Rooswijk: designated 18 January 2007, redesignated 23 February 2018

Statutory Instrument 2007 No. 61 Statutory Instrument 2007 no. 61
Statutory Instrument 2018 No. 96 Statutory Instrument 2018 no. 96

^{A62} Wheel Wreck: designated 5 April 2007

"Statutory Instrument 2007 No. 721". Office of Public Sector Information.

^{A63} HMS London: designated 24 October 2008, redesignated 31 July 2012:-

Statutory Instrument 2012 No. 1773 Statutory Instrument 2012 no. 1773

^{A64} Goodwin and Downs 8: designated 3 August 2012:-

Statutory Instrument 2012 No. 1807 Statutory Instrument 2012 no. 1807

^{A65} Unknown wooden sailing vessel: designated 31 July 2013:-

Statutory Instrument 2013 No. 1636 Statutory Instrument 2013 no. 1636

^{A66} Association: designated 21 March 2014:-

Statutory Instrument 2014 No. 753 Statutory Instrument 2014 no. 753

^{A67} HMS A3: designated 21 July 2016:-

Statutory Instrument 2016 No. 685 Statutory Instrument 2016 no. 685

^{A68} SM U-8: designated 21 July 2016:-

Statutory Instrument 2016 No. 685 Statutory Instrument 2016 no. 685

^{A69} Holigost: designated 21 July 2016:-

Statutory Instrument 2016 No. 685 Statutory Instrument 2016 no. 685

^{A70} HMT Arfon: designated 16 August 2016:-

Statutory Instrument 2016 No. 841 Statutory Instrument 2016 no. 841

^{A71} Chesil Beach cannon: designated 18 August 2017:-

Statutory Instrument 2017 No. 773 Statutory Instrument 2017 no. 773

^{A72} UC-70: designated 18 August 2017:-

Statutory Instrument 2017 No. 773 Statutory Instrument 2017 no. 773

^{A73} Unknown vessel: designated 5 July 2019:-

Statutory Instrument 2019 No. 1068 Statutory Instrument 2019 no. 1068

^{A74} Shingles Bank Wreck NW68: designated 2 June 2022:-

Statutory Instrument 2022 No. 535 Statutory Instrument 2022 no. 535

^{A75} Shingles Bank Wreck NW96: designated 2 June 2022:-

Statutory Instrument 2022 No. 535 Statutory Instrument 2022 no. 535

^{A76} Mortar Wreck: designated 2 June 2022:-

Statutory Instrument 2022 No. 535 Statutory Instrument 2022 no. 535

=== Notes on Responsible Authorities ===
^{B} Management of Protected wrecksites designated under section 1 of the Act is devolved to the National Curators of the devolved nations of the United Kingdom. Management of wrecks designated under section 2 is the responsibility of the Maritime and Coastguard Agency
^{B1} "Protected Wreck Sites" Historic England website. Retrieved 7 October 2020 See also Historic England
^{B2} "Maritime Wrecks". Cadw website. Archived from the original on 12 June 2007. See also Cadw
^{B3} See Historic Environment Scotland, formerly Historic Scotland
^{B4} See Environment and Heritage Service (of Northern Ireland)
^{B5} "Protected Wrecks in the UK". Maritime and Coastguard Agency website. See also Maritime and Coastguard Agency

=== Notes on identification of wrecksites and dating ===
^{C1} HMS Assurance: the Advisory Committee on Historic Wreck originally identified the sinking as 1738, however investigation by a former licensee into historic records dated the loss as 1753, and this is shown as the date of sinking in the site summary of the wrecksite in Appendix A(ii) of the latest report, although Appendix A(iii), The list of current designated sites, still shows the date as 1738.
^{C2} Tearing Ledge The wreck is believed to be the Romney, one of four ships lost on 22 October 1707
^{C3} Rill Cove Wreck: the identity of the wreck has not been determined. The tentative date of 1616 is based on the dates of artefacts recovered.
^{C4} Coronation: the wreck of the Coronation is thought to be split into two sites - the Kennemerland also split into two sites when wrecked. The identity of the offshore site (site 17) was confirmed by finding a plate inscribed with the family crest of the Captain. The identity of the inshore site (site 33) is more controversial. Royal Naval Guns found on the inshore site are consistent with a first or second rate ship of the line of the correct period and there is no other record of a ship of her size foundering in the area.
^{C5} Barthomolew Ledges: it is possible that the wreck is that of the Spanish vessel, San Bartholome which was wrecked in 1597, although this vessel is not recorded as being lost in the Isles of Scilly. The wreck is late 16th century and was carrying lead ingots of a Spanish type. Six recovered coins date between 1474 and 1555, hence dating the wreck after 1555.
^{C6} The Diamond: the wreck is of an early type of composite hull and was initially thought to be the Diamond. The current licensee has identified several anomalies in this identification, including that the wreck appears to be longer than the Diamond; there are discrepancies between samples of materials recovered from the wreck and those listed as being used in the construction of the Diamond, and artefacts patented after the date of sinking have been recovered.

=== Notes on Section 2 designations ===
^{D} References are to the designation order and explanatory note, where available (since 1987) on-line from the Office of Public Sector Information
^{D1} Richard Montgomery: designated 31 October 1973, because of the presence of a large amount of munitions

"SS Richard Montgomery". Maritime and Coastguard Website.

^{D2} MV Braer (oil tanker): designated 8 February 1993 because of the presence of a significant amount of oil.

revoked 7 October 1994
"Statutory Instrument 1994 No. 2372". Office of Public Sector Information.

^{D3} Castilian: designated 13 August 1997

"Statutory Instrument 1997 No. 1976". Office of Public Sector Information.
