= List of shipwrecks of Cornwall =

The list of shipwrecks of Cornwall lists the ships which sank on or near the coasts of mainland Cornwall. The list includes ships that sustained a damaged hull, which were later refloated and repaired. Around a coast of approximately 250 miles (400 km) an estimated 6000 ships have been wrecked, more than on any other comparable coastline of the British Isles. A traditional saying about the north coast is "From Pentire Point to Hartland light, A watery grave by day and night." The coast of the Lizard peninsula is particularly hazardous to shipping and the seaways round it were historically known as the "Graveyard of Ships".

N.B. For those wrecks in the Isles of Scilly, see List of shipwrecks of the Isles of Scilly and for those on the Seven Stones Reef see List of shipwrecks of the Seven Stones Reef.

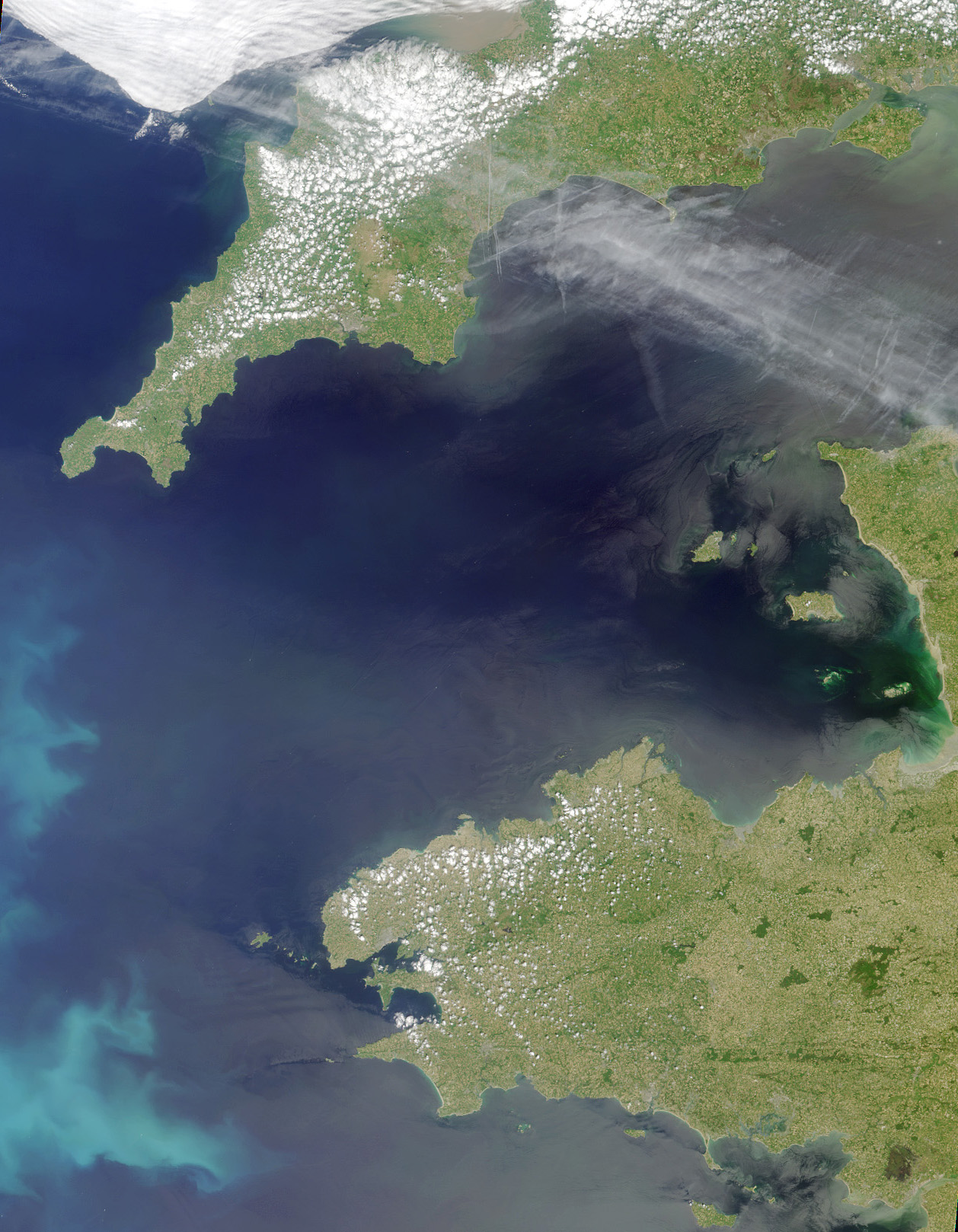
Southwestern England and the English Channel

== 1201–1300 ==
=== 1284 ===
- Two lives were lost when a boat struck a rock near the tithing of Kelynack, St Just.

== 1301–1400 ==
=== 1301/02 ===
- The mast of a wreck off Rame Head was sold for four shillings.
- Wreckage washed up within the tithing of Trelan suggesting a wreck in the area of Black Head.

=== 1307 ===
- 5 May (first report) – a Spanish cargo ship the La Maudeleyne (Crown of Castile) was stranded on the south Cornish coast, possibly in Mount's Bay. All her crew were saved and much of the cargo was salvaged. Scheduled Ancient Monument no. 1448520.

=== 1314 ===
- 1 April (first report) – Chepstow registered sailing vessel Shoreham (Kingdom of England) on voyage, in ballast, to Poitou, wrecked in Widemouth Bay. £42 was found in a chest.

=== 1318 ===
- 8 February (first report) – unidentified sailing vessel on voyage from Portugal to Flanders ″... cast away when anchored by contrary winds in Padistowe″. Men and cargo (including wine) saved.

=== 1321 ===
- 30 April (first report) – a cargo (including jewels) worth £6,000 was lost when the sailing vessel St Bartholomew ( Bilbao) lost near Lizard Point while heading for La Seyne.

=== 1340 ===
- 3 March (first report) – an Irish (Lordship of Ireland) vessel was wrecked on the Cornish coast at "Porthlyn" and broken up by men from St Perran and St Carantoc. Although a Scheduled Ancient Monument the exact location is unknown, but is likely to be in, or near, Perran Sands or Crantock.

=== 1342 ===
- (first report) – in a case brought before Edward III, La Trinite of Fowey (Kingdom of England) was boarded by Nicholas de Beer of Marhamchurch while anchored in the port of Widemouth. The cables and cords were cut and she was driven ashore by the tide and broke up. Goods to the value of £300 owned by John de Lym and Henry Bote lost.

=== 1343 ===
- 10 February (first report) – sailing vessel Tarite (Spain or France) wrecked on the south coast of Cornwall while heading for Falmouth. Cargo valued at £3,000. Scheduled Ancient Monument no. 1189787

=== 1382 ===
- Saint Marie De Marceau (Kingdom of Portugal) possibly plundered by local people in Mount's Bay sometime between 29 November and early December. The captain was captured and forced to sign over the ship and contents which was worth 600 marks.

=== 1394 ===
- Gabrielle of Milford Haven was wrecked on the Wolf Rock, between the Isles of Scilly and Cornwall. The cargo, worth £1,000, was washed ashore in Cornwall.

== 1401–1500 ==
=== 1405 ===
- Unnamed ship wrecked on the Eddystone, her mast was found at Rame Head and sold by the Duchy of Cornwall in Plymouth.

=== 1468 ===
- Raphael (or Raphaell) (Kingdom of England) lost in Bude Bay while heading for her home port of Bristol from Danzig.

=== 1478 ===
- La Kateryne (probably County of Flanders) was wrecked near St Michael's Mount. She had left Spain with a cargo of textiles, iron, wax and other goods. Nine Spanish late medieval gold coins found at Praa Sands by a metal detector may be from this wreck.

=== 1480 ===
- December – four ships carrying almost 1,000 tons of wine lost in Mount's Bay.

== 1501–1600 ==
=== 1514 ===
- 21 February (first report) – a Spanish ship (Spanish Monarchy) lost at Polkemyas (now known as Porth Kidney sands), near Lelant in the manor of Lelant and Trevethowe carrying a cargo of cloth (including scarlet).

=== 1515 ===
- an unidentified vessel was wrecked between Pensance and Markayowe, Mount's Bay while carrying a cargo of spices and textiles.
- an unidentified vessel on voyage from Dublin was wrecked between Lelant Water and Porthroppter with a cargo of ″hydes and frys″ (coarse woollen cloth).

=== 1516 ===
- 22 February (first report) – seven ships and ″barks″ lost between Lelant Water and St Ives laden with iron cast goods, cloth and other wares.

=== 1517 ===
- unnamed vessel wrecked at Porthcurno with a cargo of cloth and pewter.

=== 1517/1518 ===
- unnamed vessel wrecked near Carrack Loys, near Marckayowe (St Michael's Mount) with a cargo of hogsheads of wine, which was divided between James Chynowythe, Richard Pendre and Sir John Arundell.

=== 1518 ===
- unnamed vessel wrecked in "Whitson Bay at the Lands End", witnessed by John Davye. She was carrying wines and fruit and all on board were saved.

=== 1527 ===
- 19 January – St Anthony or Santo António (Portugal) was a carrack which foundered in Gunwalloe Bay, Cornwall, in 1527 en–route from Lisbon to Antwerp. She had a mixed cargo including copper and silver ingots, said to be worth an estimated £100 million in today's values. One half of the crew was lost. The wreck was located in 1981 and a selection of her cargo can be seen in the Charlestown Shipwreck, Rescue and Heritage Centre, Charlestown. Also reported as Saint Andrew and sinking on 19 January 1526. The site is designated under the Protection of Wrecks Act 1973.

=== 1531 ===
- (first report) – a hulk was lost at "Sennar Clyffe by Innyall Chappell" now known as Gurnard's Head within Reskymer's Manor of Trethein. She was carrying salt and all lives were lost.

=== 1532 ===
- Harry Angwyne sworn at Court that he often saw wrecks of timbers cast on the land at Whitsonbay and other places around Land's End, Cornwall.
- (First report) – an unidentified vessel was lost at the Longships, off Land's End, Cornwall.
- (First report) – a barrel of tar was washed up at Gwynver, Sennen, Cornwall and barrel of flower (flour) washed up in Whitson Bay in Gonhellye under Meen off an unidentified vessel(s).

=== 1557/1558 ===
- a vessel was wrecked near Porth Treyth (Portreath). Her mast was found below Tehedye (Tehiddy) cliff, timber found at Carvannel and four hogsheads of Gascon wine found at Porthreath.

=== 1565 ===
- a sailing vessel foundered in Mount's Bay, possibly near Newlyn where an anchor was found. The year of loss is given as the 7th or 8th year of Elizabeth I reign (beginning 17 November 1565 to 1567).

=== 1571 ===
- (first report) – an unidentified ship wrecked at Cudden Point. Some of her cargo of wine salvaged.

=== 1575 ===
- (first report) – an unidentified barque out of Ireland, carrying herring was driven ashore at Porthreptor (Carbis Bay). One quarter of the ship came ashore at Polkemyas (Arundel Port).

=== 1588 ===
- a wreck in Mullion Cove may be the Santo Christo de Castello (Republic of Genoa). The 1589 or 1590 wreck (see below) may refer to this wreck.

=== 1589/1590 ===
- A small galleon captured on the Spanish Main in the summer of 1589 by George Clifford, the Earl of Cumberland, and sent home as a "prize" the following winter. Under the command of Christopher Lister and with a cargo of looted silver, she was lost with all hands in a gale near Penzance.

=== 1595 ===
- 2 August – During a Spanish raid, John of Mousehole and two other ships were sunk off Penzance.

== 1601–1700 ==
In 1621 Sir John Killigrew reported “... a certificate of ye losse of 25 ships there and thereabouts within this dozen or twente years besides a great numbre of others whose ruines lye neare those rocks and cliffs, not knowne of whome or what they weare.”

=== 1616 ===
- unknown ship, known as Rill Cove Wreck (Spain) – a cargo vessel foundered off Rill Cove, near Kynance Cove in Mount's Bay. Finds include 300 coins in two datable groups 1555–98 and 1598–1603/5. The year 1616 is tentative.

=== 1619 ===
- unknown date – a ship (Spain) from San Lucar carrying silver bullion near Polpear Cove.

=== 1632 ===
- January – an unnamed cargo ship, carrying fustick wood and tobacco, wrecked in Manor of Tintagel near Crackington, St Gennys with the loss of all lives. Scheduled Ancient Monument no. 1321098.

=== 1635 ===
- February – a galleon (Spain) homeward bound from the Indies was captured and looted by the Dutch. Putting into "Guavers Lake" (Gwavas Lake) off Newlyn she hit the Low Lee ledge. Attempts at salvage by the authorities were opposed by the inhabitants of Mousehole and Market Jew who raided the ship at night and took away "two hundred hides". A looted cannon from this ship was salvaged by the Greencastle in 1916 and for many years was in front of Penzance Library, before being stolen.

=== 1637 ===
- 18 February – Three Dutch Republic warships were lost during a naval action off the coast of the Lizard peninsula, Cornwall. A Spanish ( (Spain) ) armada of eight warships intercepted an Anglo-Dutch merchant convey of fifty vessels and also captured seventeen of the ships.

=== 1649 ===
- 30 January – the Garland (Royal Navy) of Topsham carrying garments and other possessions of the late Charles I, together with some personal belongings of his fugitive Queen and the wardrobe of the Prince of Wales wrecked at Godrevy. She was taking shelter off St Ives in a great storm and dragged her anchors. Only a man, boy and wolf–dog survived out of about sixty passengers and crew.

=== 1658 ===
- unknown date – Levant Company ship Aleppo Merchant (Kingdom of England) wrecked on the approaches to the River Camel at Treyarnon Bay while on passage from Smyrna for London

=== 1659 ===
- unknown date – a Dutch West Indian ship (Dutch Republic) was wrecked off Sennen Cove with a cargo of silver ingots.

=== 1667 ===
- March – Jonkheer (master Van de Putterstock) of the Dutch East India Company with a cargo of sugar, coffee, spices and Banca tin with a value of £50,000 was wrecked under Angrouse Cliff near Mullion Cove, Cornwall.
- October – ship carrying silver coin lost at Lizard Point.
- an 800-ton ship (Genoa) with 48 guns and a value of £100 000 lost on the Lizard. This wreck may be the ship the Ferdinand Research Group discovered in 1969 below Angrouse Cliff near Mullion Cove

=== 1669 ===
- unknown date – San Salvador (France) near the Lizard. This wreck may be the ship the Ferdinand Research Group discovered in 1969 below Angrouse Cliff near Mullion Cove.

=== 1676 ===
- unknown date - a Spanish galleon was wrecked on Halzephron cliffs; its cargo was said to be worth £2 million, Gunwalloe.

=== 1683 ===
- 11 February – an unnamed ship foundered off Porthleven and her captain Jonathan Hide was drowned.

=== 1684 ===
- 9 February – East Indiaman the President ( British East India Company) ran aground on Loe Bar. She was carrying a valuable cargo of spices, indigo, drugs, textiles, pepper, diamonds and ″Jewish Treasure of Pearl″ More of the wreck was uncovered, following storms, in 2018. In 2018 divers found seven cannon and an anchor thought to be from the wreck.
- 4 April – the Schiedam (Royal Navy) a Dutch built fluit and, at the time, a sixth rate transport ship of the English fleet wrecked at Jangye Ryn near Gunwalloe Church Cove.

=== 1691 ===
- 3 September – 2nd rate HMS Coronation, (Royal Navy) foundered off Rame Head while at anchor in a south–east gale with the loss of approximately 600 lives.

=== 1695 ===
- an unnamed Dutch cargo vessel was torn to pieces by the local people.

=== 1700 ===
- February – East Indiaman Thornton ( British East India Company) wrecked at Port Quin.

== 1701–1800 ==
=== 1704 ===
- 16 January – approximately one hundred lives lost when the 4th rate HMS Colchester, (Royal Navy) was wrecked in Whitesand Bay.

=== 1707 ===
- 21 October – third-rate ship of the line HMS Devonshire ( (Kingdom of Great Britain) Royal Navy) sank after a battle off Lizard Point against a French fleet of twelve ships. She was one of five ships escorting a convoy to Lisbon with supplies for the war in Spain. There were only three survivors out of a complement of 500.

=== 1708 ===
- 9 December – East Indiaman, Albemarle ( British East India Company) ran aground near Polperro, with a cargo of diamonds, coffee, pepper, silk and indigo.

=== 1720 ===
- 13 December – an unnamed American vessel under Captain Mellis wrecked near Porthleven.

=== 1721 ===
- 10 November – the 127 ft HMS Royal Anne Galley, ( (Kingdom of Great Britain) Royal Navy) the last oared fighting ship built for the Royal Navy, hit the Stags off Lizard Point while en route to the West Indies with Lord Belhaven, the new Governor of Barbados. 182 crew and 25 gentlemen died and there were only three survivors; those who were saved were said to be local men; Thomas Lawrence, William Godfrey and a boy, George Hain; their names are sung in a ballad about the wreck which alleges that the dead were savaged by wild dogs. Designated under the Protection of Wrecks Act.

=== 1739 ===
- 14 December – Dutch vessel Lady Lucy (Dutch Republic) wrecked on Porthleven beach while bound for Rotterdam from Bordeaux with a cargo of wine, coffee, indigo and brandy.

=== 1738 ===
- 21 November – Vigilantia bound for Hamburg from Lisbon with a cargo of salt, tobacco, sugar and lemons was wrecked west of Porthleven with the loss of the captain, three crew and all the cargo. Five men were saved.
- 29 December – Rotterdam ship the Nebotis Vineyard (Dutch Republic) with a cargo of wine wrecked near Porthleven.

=== 1745 ===
- 19 September – while sailing in a convoy from the Isles of Scilly to the Isle of Wight, the Phoenix hit the Gulf Rock (original name for the Wolf Rock). She was sailing from South Carolina with rice, and was taken by a French privateer who brought her to Scilly by mistake. She was captured by the Scillonians for which four fishermen and a boy received £3000 salvage.
- 24 November – the privateer Boscawen (Kingdom of Great Britain) was wrecked during a storm at St Ives. She was formerly the Medee, captured in 1744 from the French by Lord Boscawen and released by the Admiralty as a prize.

=== 1746 ===
- Unknown date – Jane (Great Britain) foundered off Fowey while on a voyage from Pool, Dorset to Fowey.

=== 1748 ===
- 8 December – a ″large mob of villagers″ from Porthleven looted the Jonge Alicada (Dutch Republic) of 167 tuns of Bordeaux wine. She was on voyage to Amsterdam. One tun was 252 gallons.

=== 1749 ===
- Squirell wrecked at Newporth Head to the south–west of Falmouth.

=== 1751 ===
- 3 March – fourteen crew were lost when 300-ton vessel was wrecked near Porthleven. Her cargo of wine, brandy and fruit was plundered.

=== 1752 ===
- August – Two Brothers (Kingdom of Great Britain) stranded in a storm (24, 25 or 26 August) five miles west of St Ives with the loss of one life. The vessel was sailing from Drogheda to London with flax seed and calves' skins.
- August – Unity wrecked to the west of St Ives in a storm (24, 25 or 26 August).
- August – three unidentified vessels lost in a storm (24, 25 or 26 August) west of St Ives.

=== 1753 ===
- 4 or 14 December – while en route from Bordeaux for Amsterdam the Heneda of Wergham lost in Mount's Bay about a league from Penzance. Most of the cargo of nuts and wine was saved.

=== 1754 ===
- 12 December – brig Adventure Kingdom of Great Britain) carrying hemp, iron and tallow from Peterburgh sank as she entered her home port of St Michael's Mount.
- 21 December (first report) – a snow from the West Indies lost off the Lizard.
- HMS Spencer, ( (Kingdom of Great Britain) Royal Navy) wrecked near the mouth of the Helford River.
- HMS Rinovia, ( (Kingdom of Great Britain) Royal Navy) wrecked near the mouth of the Helford River.
- HMS Olive Branch, ( (Kingdom of Great Britain) Royal Navy) wrecked near the mouth of the Helford River.

=== 1758 ===
- 20 October – the Bell a vessel smuggling tea and brandy was wrecked near Porthleven while trying to escape from the Shaftesbury a customs sailing cutter which was also wrecked.

=== 1760 ===
- 29 September – a xebecca the Cavalla Bianca (Ottoman Empire) wrecked on Chimney Rocks (grid reference SW475297), Penzance. The crew of Algerian corsairs and Turkish soldiers were delighted to find they were wrecked in Cornwall rather than Spain and they were repatriated to Algiers aboard a British warship. Davies Gilbert retells a contemporary account from witnesses of the Algerine cosair running aground a little further to the west on the beach towards Newlyn. The captain thought the ship was in the Atlantic Ocean at about the latitude of Cádiz. Eight of those onboard drowned.

=== 1763 ===
- 6 December – brigantine Hanover lost under Cligga Head while seeking shelter in the lee of the shore. She was a packet boat on a journey from Lisbon to Falmouth. Of the thirty crew and passengers only three survived. Most of her cargo of gold coin was recovered. The wreck was discovered in Hanover Cove during June, 1994 by Colin Martin and confirmed as the Hanover with the recovery of a bronze bell inscribed "THE HANOVER PACQUET, 1757". In 1997, 50 cannon, a gold ring and part of the ship's structure was recovered. The site is designated as an Ancient Monument.

=== 1764 ===
- 23 November – an unknown vessel with a cargo of salt and brandy was wrecked near Porthleven.

=== 1767 ===
- 28 August – the Olive Branch (Great Britain) from Liverpool caught fire about two leagues off Penzance and went down with her cargo. The crew were saved by local fishermen.

=== 1768 ===
- January – several hogsheads of wine were salvaged by local people when a Dutch vessel was wrecked near Porthleven. There was no crew on board when the ship came ashore.

=== 1772 ===
- Fanny (or Fenny) bound for Bristol from London wrecked at Bude with the loss of all three crew.

=== 1773 ===
- May – a French warship the L'Apollen French Navy) was lost off Land's End with all hands.

=== 1778 ===
- a Dutch craft was wrecked at Morwenstow.

=== 1780 ===
- January – an unnamed ship with a cargo of cotton, coffee and cocoa was wrecked near Porthleven.
- unknown date – a ship with several tons of gold coins wrecked at Gunwalloe. The cove is sometimes known as Dollar Cove.

=== 1781 ===
- 11 October – HMS Firebrand, ( (Kingdom of Great Britain) Royal Navy) blew up and sank off Penarrow Point, near the naval port of Mylor.

=== 1782 ===
- 30 March – while carrying wine and cork from Porto to Southampton the Tortington was wrecked near Porthleven.

=== 1786 ===
- 10 December – the Metta Catharina hit Drakes Island and sank off Mount Edgcumbe with a cargo of calf hides, glassware and other items. The wreck was discovered in 1973 and some of the goods salvaged: some of the calf hides were sold to a few selected craftsmen to help fund further excavations.

=== 1787 ===
- 28 February – Star Cross wrecked off Manacle Point.

=== 1790 ===
- 177-ton brig and slave ship, the Alert wrecked at Bude while bound from Bristol to Africa with a cargo of iron. Five of the crew are in the Parish of Stratton burials register.
- A Spanish ship carrying $17 million belonging to Spanish bankers foundered in Dollar Cove, Gunwalloe.

=== 1791 ===
- 3 November – the Fanny with a cargo of coal was wrecked near Porthleven.

=== 1792 ===
- January – Pola carrying hemp and cider wrecked near Porthleven.
- Briel Dutch Republic Navy), a 4th rate Ship of the Line hit the Ebber Rocks on the Lizard Peninsula

=== 1795 ===
- 20 November – the Hope wrecked on Loe Bar while bound for Plymouth from Bristol.
- 17 December – sloop Trident carrying flour and rum from Île d'Yeu, France, to Plymouth wrecked near Porthleven.

=== 1796 ===
- 2 January – an unidentified ship with "cable and post attached" was driven out of Penzance harbour and on to nearby rocks.
- 23 January – an unidentified troop ship, possibly one of Admiral Christian's West Indies convoy was wrecked within a cable length of Loe Bar during a ″great storm″ in Mount's Bay. The ship was carrying between 400 and 600 officers and men of the 26th Regiment of Dragoons; not one of the crew or passengers survived. Large quantities of wreckage were washed up including dead horses with D26 brands on their hooves. It is estimated that over 600 people died including nine people on shore.
- 23 January – a 300-ton ship from Bremen ran aground on Cairn Jenny, near the Abbey Slip, Penzance, Cornwall.
- January – Margaretta (Batavian Republic) was driven ashore near Marazion, while on a voyage from Rotterdam to a French port.
- 6 February – Hall (Great Britain) wrecked at St Minver while on a voyage from Liverpool to Jamaica.

=== 1798 ===
- a ship (United States) moored in Gwavas Lake broke its moorings, drifted towards the Wherry Mine striking its ″turret″, flooding the mine and causing it to cease trading. A book published in 1820 makes no mention of a ship but blames, high tides, storms and the ″declining state of the lode″ which induced the adventurers to abandon the mine in 1798.

== Since 2001 ==
=== 2002 ===
- 1 January – tanker Willy (Cyprus) dragged her anchor and grounded in Cawsand Bay while awaiting orders, after discharging her cargo of unleaded petrol at the Cattewater, Plymouth two days previously.
- 2 February – timber carrying cargo ship Kodima ran aground in Whitsand Bay.
- April – former Admiralty supply boat Sanu took shelter in the Gannel Estuary while heading along the north Cornish coast bound for Bristol and restoration. She was driven up the estuary on a spring tide and grounded. Wreck finally removed in October 2013.

=== 2003 ===
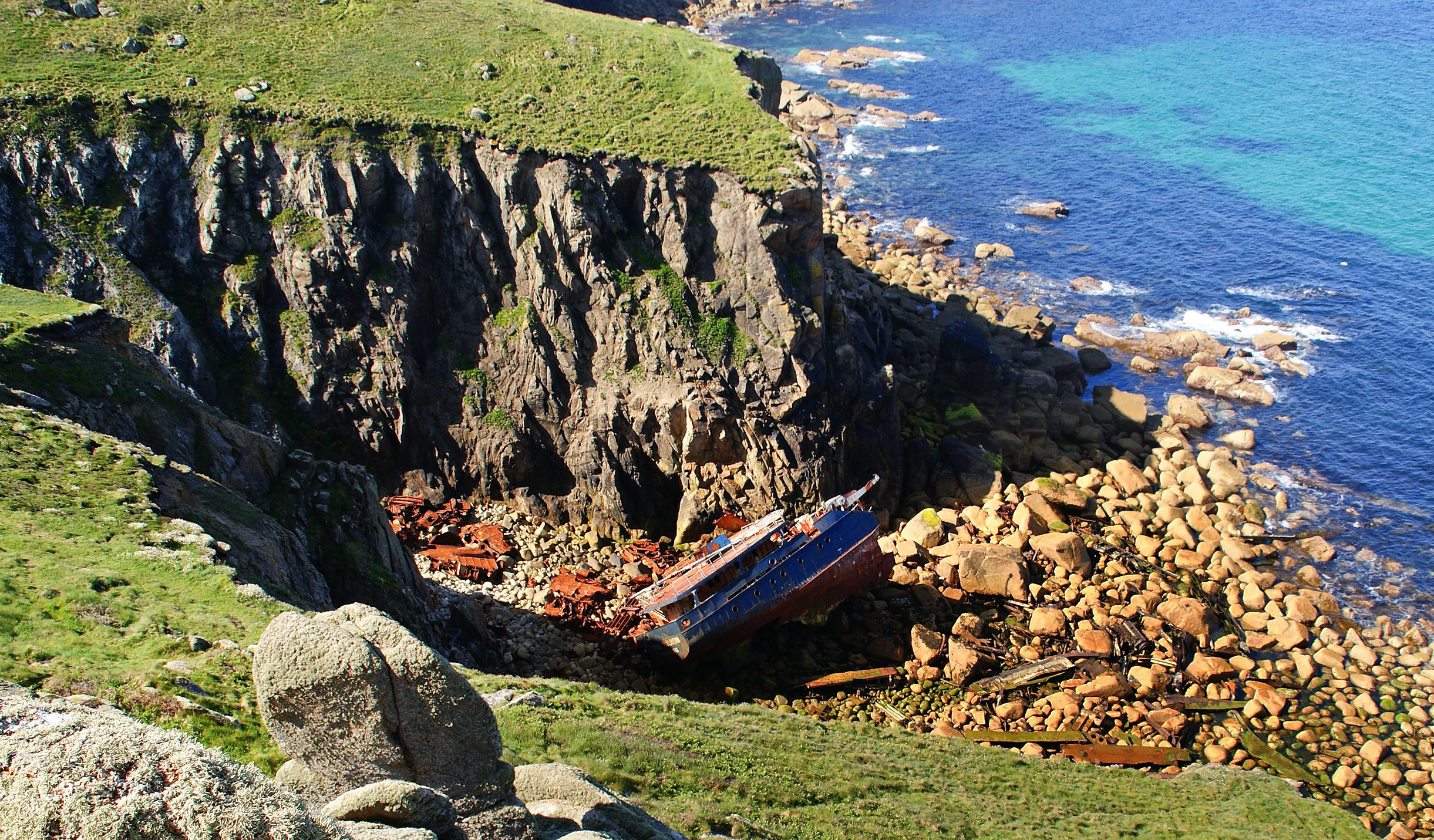
RMS Mulheim wreck

- 22 March – RMS Mulheim (Antigua and Barbuda) on a voyage from Cork, Ireland, to Lübeck, Germany, transporting 2,200 tonnes of scrap car plastic ran aground in Gamper Bay, between Land's End and Sennen Cove. Declared a constructive total loss on 24 March.

=== 2004 ===
- 27 March – HMS Scylla (Royal Navy) deliberately sunk to form an artificial reef for diving in Whitsand Bay.

=== 2008 ===
- 29 May – Newlyn fishing boat The Girl Patricia (United Kingdom) sank 28 nautical miles NW of Land's End. All four crew winched to safety by RNAS Culdrose helicopter.

=== 2010 ===
- 11 March – fishing vessel Ben My Chree' (United Kingdom) started to sink seventeen miles NE of the Isles of Scilly and four of the crew taken off by RNAS Culdrose helicopter and one by the St Mary's relief lifeboat Daniel L Gibson ( Royal National Lifeboat Institution). Ship taken in tow by fisheries protection vessel St Piran (United Kingdom) and sank a mile off Gwennap Head, Cornwall.

=== 2011 ===
- 3 August – Karin Schepers (Netherlands): The cargo ship ran aground off the Trevean Cliff, Morvah. She refloated and continued her voyage from Cork to Rotterdam.
- 20 December – fishing vessel Heather Anne (United Kingdom): sank in Gerrans Bay with the loss of one of the two crew.

=== 2012 ===
- 23 April – tug Aquarius (United Kingdom) sank 45 miles off the Lizard with one of the three crew missing

=== 2013 ===
- 28 August – trawler Scuderia (France) ran aground at Lankidden Cove, on the east side of the Lizard between Coverack and Cadgwith. None of the five crew were injured. She was refloated on 3 September and towed to Falmouth for repairs.
- 3 November – fishing vessel Panamera (France) sank off Lizard Point, Cornwall. There was no loss of life amongst her French and Portuguese crew.

=== 2014 ===
- 1 February – trawler Le Sillon (France) went aground at Park Head near Porthcothan Bay after losing power and steering approximately 5 miles off Trevose Head. All six of the crew were safely rescued. Five crew members were recovered by a rescue helicopter from RNAS Culdrose, the skipper was picked up by the Padstow Lifeboat.
- 9 March – cargo ship Sea Breeze (Barbados) was abandoned in the English Channel 10 nautical miles (19 km) off The Lizard. Her six crew were rescued by the Falmouth and Lizard Lifeboats. A magnetic patch was later placed on the hole in the vessels' hull and she was towed in to St. Austell Bay.

=== 2021 ===
• 11 August - Fishing vessel Fredwood MT338 of Maryport, Scotland. Ran aground on Battery rocks early morning after crew fell asleep on watch. Later refloated on rising tide and towed to Newlyn by the Penlee Lifeboat and workboat Danmark. No injuries and vessel returned to service after inspection.

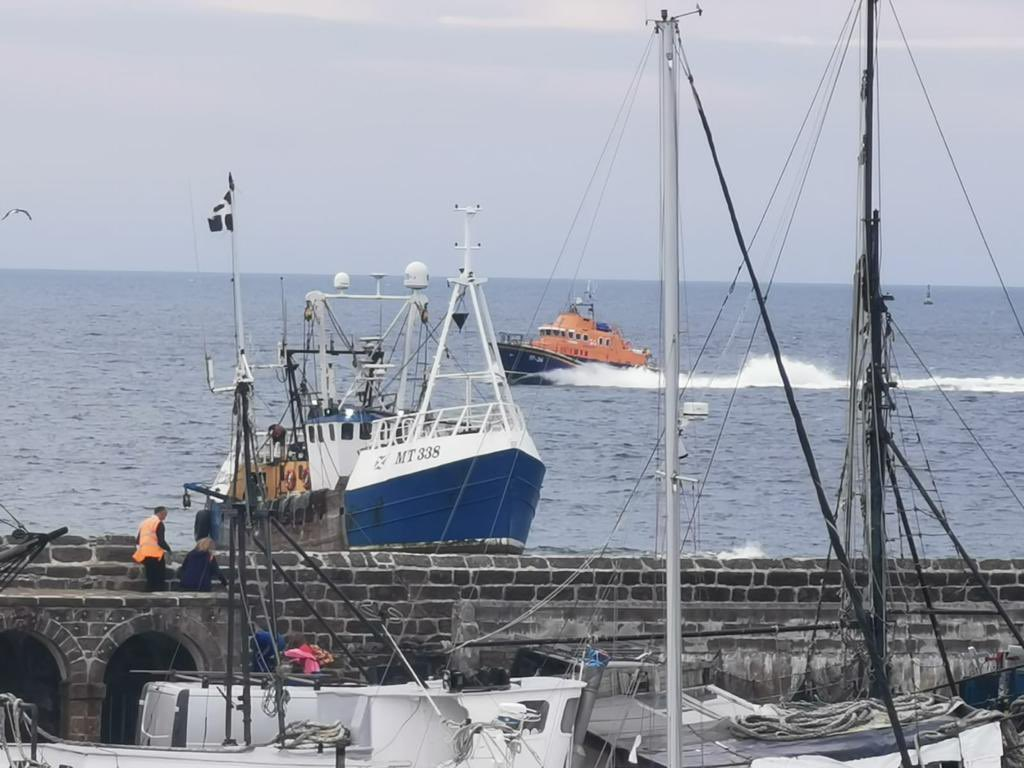
Fishing vessel FREDWOOD aground on Battery Rocks, Penzance

2022

• 12 November 2022 - The 7.49m fishing vessel “Craig-A-Tana” of Cadgwith sank 6 miles south-east of Bass Point. Skipper and crewman abandoned the rapidly sinking boat and took to the life raft. Both were picked up with no injuries by the Lizard lifeboat after successful activation of the EPIRB.

=== 2023 ===
•14 February 2023 - Belgian-registered 24-metre beam trawler “Sylvia Marie Z-525” hit rocks and sank off Porthgwarra around 1800 hours, local time. The crew made a distress call before taking to the life raft and were later rescued by Sennen Lifeboat. No injuries reported

== See also ==
- List of shipwrecks of the Isles of Scilly
- Protection of Wrecks Act 1973
- Archaeology of shipwrecks
- List of designations under the Protection of Wrecks Act

== Sources ==
- Historic England, "Rill Cove (1000046)", National Heritage List for England
