= Loe Bar Wreck =

Coordinates: 50°03′48″N 5°17′26″W

The remains of a seventeenth century cargo vessel were identified in Gunwalloe fishing cove, Cornwall in 1998. The site was designated under the Protection of Wrecks Act on 23 May 1999. The wreck is a Protected Wreck managed by Historic England.

== The wreck ==
The wreck site consists of iron guns, an anchor, an iron object, and possible smaller objects.

== Discovery and investigation ==
The site was found in 1998 and subsequently surveyed by the Archaeological Diving Unit. In 2005 Wessex Archaeology undertook a designation assessment.

== Identity ==
It is believed that the site represents the wreck of the President, a 500-ton English East Indiaman built in 1671 and lost in 1684. The cannon on site correspond with a seventeenth century date. No archaeological evidence exists to confirm this identity.
