= Dunwich Bank Wreck =

Coordinates: 52°15′10″N 1°38′25″E

The remains of an unknown armed cargo vessel dating to the sixteenth to seventeenth century were identified off Dunwich, Suffolk, England in 1993. The site was designated under the Protection of Wrecks Act on 12 July 1994. The wreck is a Protected Wreck managed by Historic England.

== The wreck ==
The wreck site includes a wreck mound with associated bronze muzzle-loading guns, breech-loading guns and unknown concreted objects. Timber pieces and bronze cannon have been recovered from the site. The wreck is believed to date from 1556 to 1600 based on the dating of recovered guns. Based on the contemporary value of bronze guns, it was deemed that they represented a foundered wreck, rather than having been jettisoned by a ship.

== Discovery and investigation ==
A local fisherman found timber with embedded cannonballs in 1993, later investigation by Suffolk Underwater Studies Unit produced further wreck material and a bronze cannon. Six cannon have been recorded on the site by the Archaeological Diving Unit and Wessex Archaeology.

In 2020, further investigation was undertaken by Wessex Archaeology, funded by Historic England.
