= Gull Rock Wreck =

Coordinates: 51°11′07″N 4°39′24″W

The Gull Rock Wreck was discovered off Gull Rock, Lundy Island, England in 1968. The site was designated under the Protection of Wrecks Act on 12 February 1990. The wreck is a Protected Wreck managed by Historic England.

== The wreck ==
The site includes a range of objects dating to between the fifteenth and sixteenth centuries. The objects include wrought iron breech blocks, a wrought iron gun, and some stone shot. The remains are presumed to be those of an armed cargo vessel or warship that foundered and sunk. An unnamed Genoese carrack was recorded as being wrecked on Lundy in 1418, the remains may represent the wreck of this vessel.

== Discovery and investigation ==
The site was first identified in 1968, and rediscovered in 1983. The Archaeological Diving Unit surveyed the site in 1989 and reported on guns and shot, as well as two cannon close to the site. The site was reassessed in 2004 by Wessex Archaeology.
