= HMY Mary =

Former Royal Yacht of the Royal Navy

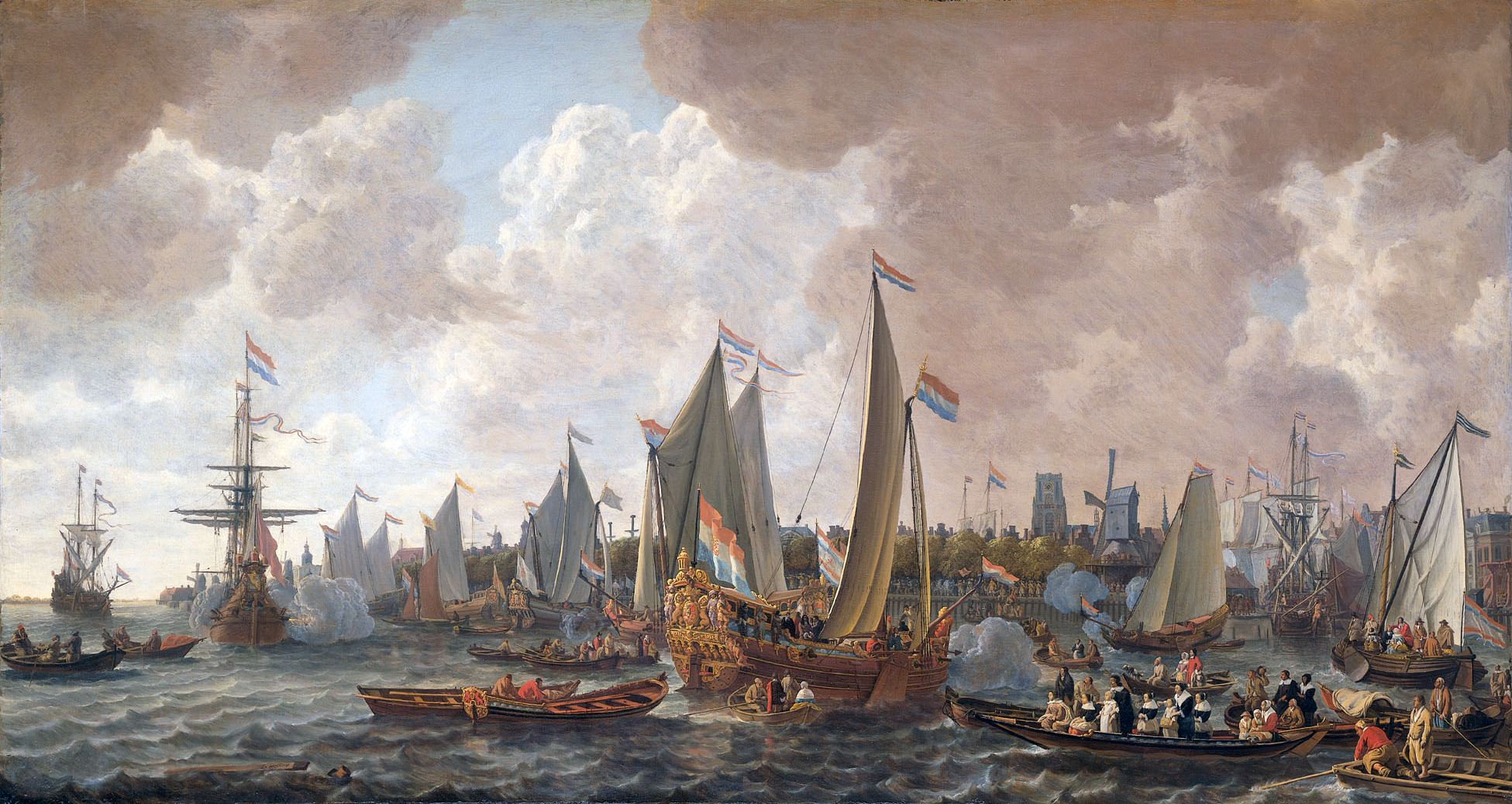
- The arrival of King Charles II of England in Rotterdam, 24 May 1660 by Lieve Verschuier. Charles sailed from Breda to Delft in May 1660 in a yacht owned by the Dutch East India Company. Charles received a replica as he was impressed.

History

Dutch East India Company
- Builder: Amsterdam
- Cost: £644
- Fate: Gifted by the City of Amsterdam to King Charles II

History

England
- Name: Mary
- Acquired: August 1660
- Fate: Sunk on the Skerries, 25 March 1675

General characteristics
- Type: Yacht
- Tons burthen: 92 tons bm
- Length: 50 ft (15 m)
- Beam: 18 ft 6 in (5.64 m)
- Height: 7 ft 4 in (2.24 m)
- Draught: 7 ft 0 in (2.13 m)
- Sail plan: Gaff rig
- Crew: 30 mariners, 20 gunners, 20 soldiers
- Armament: 8/6 x 3 pdrs
- Notes: All figures taken from Winfield, Rif (2009). British Warships in the Age of Sail 1714–1792: Design, Construction, Careers and Fates. Seaforth. p. 250. ISBN 978-1-84832-040-6.

HMY Mary was the first Royal Yacht of the Royal Navy. She was built in 1660 by the Dutch East India Company. Then she was purchased by the City of Amsterdam and given to King Charles II, on the restoration of the monarchy, as part of the Dutch Gift. She struck rocks off Anglesey in thick fog on 25 March 1675 while en route from Dublin to Chester. Although 35 of the 74 crew and passengers were killed as the wreck quickly broke up, 39 managed to get to safety. The remains (bronze cannon) were independently discovered by two different diving groups in July 1971. After looters started to remove guns from the site, a rescue operation was organized and the remaining guns and other artifacts were taken to the Merseyside Museums for conservation and display. After the passing of the Protection of Wrecks Act 1973, she was designated as a protected site on 20 January 1974.

== Construction and sailing life ==
She was the first of some 27 yachts which the king owned between 1660 and 1685. The word yacht derives from a Dutch word jagen, meaning to hunt and to hunt down other ships. Her hull was copper clad to ensure that barnacles and other sea creatures did not adhere and cause drag. The Dutch yacht is the fore-runner of the Thames sailing barge. They had a large sail area, but a shallow draught that enabled them to navigate shallow waters. As with a sailing barge, sailing was achieved by means of a leeboard instead of having a deep keel. The shallow draught meant that she needed to carry additional ballast when sailing deeper waters. She was built for luxury with a decorated counter. She is mentioned in the diaries of Samuel Pepys. Charles II enjoyed racing and after owning her for a year commissioned the Katherine as a faster replacement; the first vessel built for him by Phineas Pett.

Mary was then used for transporting diplomats and civil servants and was used regularly for journeys across the Irish Sea between Dublin and Holyhead.

== Wrecking, recovery and protection ==
She was on a regular journey across the Irish Sea, en route from Dublin to Chester, on 25 March 1675. In the early hours of the morning in thick fog, she struck rocks on the south-west corner of The Skerries off Anglesey at position 53°25′9.31″N 4°36′42.15″W. The ship soon capsized and sank, and of the 28 crew and 46 passengers, only 39 scrambled ashore to be rescued two days later.

The bronze guns were discovered by both the Chorley Sub Aqua Club and the Merseyside Sub Aqua Club in the same month. Under the direction of Peter Davies of Liverpool University and the Merseyside Museums, the artefacts were rescued from the site before they were lost to looters. The collection was conserved by the Liverpool City Museums Conservation Department and the Merseyside Museums now have over 1,500 objects from the Mary, including cutlery and jewellery. A model of the Mary, built by Des Newton is also on display.

The Protection of Wrecks Act was passed in 1974 and the Mary was amongst the first designations (after the Cattewater) in 1974.

The site is regularly monitored by the contractor for the Protection of Wrecks Act and by the licensee.

== See also ==
- List of Royal Yachts of the United Kingdom
- List of designations under the Protection of Wrecks Act
