= Tearing Ledge Wreck =

Coordinates: 49°52′14″N 6°26′32″W

The Tearing Ledge Wreck consists of the remains of a ship, possibly one of the ships belonging to Admiral Cloudisley Shovell's fleet of 21 vessels returning from the Siege of Toulon via Gibraltar, that were found in 1969 on Tearing Ledge, Western Rocks, Isles of Scilly. The site was designated under the Protection of Wrecks Act on 12 February 1975. The wreck is a Protected Wreck managed by the National Heritage List for England.

== The wreck ==
The site includes 65 iron guns, cannon balls, an anchor, a glass bottle and other glass fragments, and some lead scupper pipes. The ships bell dated to 1701, three lead containers, and some gold and silver coins were also recovered. The wreck sits on Tearing Ledge in a steep-sided gully.

== Discovery and investigation ==
Remains of the wreck were found in 1969 by local divers. Survey work was undertaken in 1974-76, and further assessment was conducted in 2007/2008. In 2016 Historic England commissioned Cornwall Archaeological Unit to produce a Conservation Statement and Management Plan.

== Identity ==
It was originally believed that the wreck was that of the Romney, lost in 1707. A desk-based assessment undertaken in 2007/2008 did identify a chart by Gostello that shows the Romney as having been lost near the Tearing Ledge Site, the Romney would have carried a maximum of 54 guns, and so this identity has been discarded. Survey work carried out in 1974-76 gathered information which suggested that the Tearing Ledge wreck was that of the Eagle. The Eagle has been marked on the Gostello chart as having been lost on the Crim, however, this could be a case of mistaken identity, as there is another 'Tearing Ledge' next to the Crim Rocks. The dating of the bell also corresponds with the recommissioning of the Eagle after a rebuild.

In 1707, Admiral Sir Cloudesley Shovell returned to England from the Mediterranean with a fleet of 21 ships when they ran aground on the Western Rocks in Scilly on the night of 22 October. Three ships, Eagle, Romney and Sir Cloudesley’s flagship Association, were lost.

No direct archaeological evidence has been recovered to confirm the identity of the wreck.
