= West Bay Wreck =

Shipwreck near West Bay, Dorset, England

Coordinates: 50°42′15″N 2°46′42″W

The remains of a seventeenth century cargo vessel were found to the west of the Outer Pollock Reef, off West Bay, Dorset, England in 2004. The site was designated under the Protection of Wrecks Act on 17 July 2005. The wreck is a Protected Wreck managed by Historic England.

== The wreck ==
The wreck appears to date to between 1627 and 1750 based on the dating of a bronze muzzle-loading gun found on the site. Also found on the site were a number of iron bars, an iron gun, and potential ballast of hard slate and quartzite. The ballast appears to originate from southwest England or Northern France.

== Discovery and investigation ==
The site was discovered in 2004 by members of the local sub-aqua club while diving on the reef. Designation assessment took place in 2005.

The site is frequently surveyed by Bournemouth University.
