= Chesil Beach cannon =

The Chesil Beach cannon consists of the remains of an unknown wreck were found on Chesil Beach, Dorset, England, in 2010. The site was designated on 18 July 2017. The wreck is a Protected Wreck managed by Historic England.

== The wrecks ==
The site consists of two areas with clusters of cannon. The inshore site (50°36′46″N 2°32′04″W) consists of eight English 24– to 32-pounder cast-iron cannon dated to between 1650 and 1725 which are believed to represent the wreck of a merchant ship carrying the cannon as cargo. South of this site, a secondary offshore site (50°36′39″N 2°32′04″W) consists of seven cast iron English cannon, one of which is dated to the second half of the seventeenth century. The offshore site has been interpreted as the wreck of a different vessel, potentially carrying the guns as armament rather than cargo, evidenced by iron shot present in the mouth of the bore of one cannon which indicates it was loaded.

== Discovery and investigation ==
The site was discovered in 2010 by the Shipwrecks Project. The sites were investigated by Wessex Archaeology in 2015; this involved a programme of diving surveys.

A number of archaeological finds of similar dates have been identified near the sites since the 1970s including a large plug of tobacco found below a cannon up to 500m to the northwest of the sites. Shot, a brass barrel spigot, and some silver Dutch coins have also been found in the vicinity of the sites.

== Identity ==
Neither of the sites have been attributed to a specific wreck, however, there are some contenders for possible identities. The Dutch West Indiaman De Hoop became stranded at Chesil Cove in 1749 while travelling from Jamaica to Amsterdam carrying gold and silver coins, textiles, and tobacco. She was described as armed. Another possible identity is Squirrel which was a cargo vessel stranded on Chesil Beach in 1750 carrying tobacco. These ships may be represented by the Chesil Beach sites; however, they date to considerably later than the believed date of the cannon at the sites, and there is currently no archaeological evidence to confirm the identities of either of the wrecks.
