= Langdon Bay Wreck =

Coordinates: 51°07′38″N 1°20′42″E

The remains of a Middle Bronze Age vessel were identified in Langdon Bay, Kent, England in 1974. The site was designated under the Protection of Wrecks Act on 25 May 1978. The wreck is a Protected Wreck managed by Historic England.

== The wreck ==
The site consists of Middle Bronze Age artefacts, including tools, weapons, and ornaments made in France. These items have been dated to 1100 B.C. Over 350 artefacts have been recovered. They appear to have formed cargo of a seafaring vessel.

== Discovery and investigation ==
The site was first identified in 1974 by members of Dover sub-aqua club. The site was repeatedly visited during the following decades, the last artefacts were recovered in 1989.

The site was investigated by Cotswold Archaeology in 2016, this survey concluded that there was low potential for further bronze artefacts to be present.
