= Unknown Wreck off Thorness Bay =

Wreck of a wooden sailing vessel in Thorness Bay, Isle of Wight, England

Coordinates: 50°44′54″N 1°21′22″W

The wreck of a wooden sailing vessel was discovered in Thorness Bay, Isle of Wight, England in 2010. The site was designated under the Protection of Wrecks Act on 31 July 2013. The wreck is a Protected Wreck managed by Historic England.

== The wreck ==
The site consists of dispersed ship structure made up of framing, planking, fixtures and fittings. Identifiable objects include rigging, navigation equipment, and possible cargo. It is believed to be a mid-to-late nineteenth century cargo vessel.

== Discovery and investigation ==
The wreck was discovered in 2010 during survey for the New Forest National Park Authority as part of a wider project. A comprehensive site survey was undertaken in 2011.
