= Erme Estuary Wreck =

The Erme Estuary wreck is a shipwreck site containing the remains of potentially more than one wreck that was discovered in 1990 on Mary Reef in the Erme Estuary in Dorset. The site was designated under the Protection of Wrecks Act on 1 May 1991. The wreck is a Protected Wreck managed by Historic England.

== The site ==
Material dating to the fifteenth to eighteenth centuries is present within the site. It is unknown if the material represents a wrecked vessel or vessels as no wreck material has been identified, however, the date range of the cannon found within the site indicates that more than one vessel may be represented. Five cannon and a swivel gun with breech, ammunition and tampion with a rope knot on the breech handle were dated to 1490–1550. Another cannon has been identified as a Swedish finbanker dating to 1690–1750. Further to this, one French silver coin dated to 1610–1640, a lead pan weight dated to 1549–1780, a pestle, and a small bronze figurine were found within the site.

== Discovery and investigation ==
The site was discovered in 1990 by snorkeller Steve George who found four cast iron guns, a wrought iron swivel gun, and an anchor. Further artefacts were recovered after the site was designated under a licence.

Previous investigation in 1982 produced one cannon, approximately 9 ft in length.

The site is regularly monitored by Bournemouth University.
