= Studland Bay Wreck =

Shipwreck off Dorset, England

Coordinates: 50°39′41″N 1°54′52″W

The remains of an armed cargo vessel were discovered in 1983 in Studland Bay, off Dorset, England. The site was designated under the Protection of Wrecks Act on 22 October 1984. The wreck is a Protected Wreck managed by Historic England

== The wreck ==
The site consists of remains of a wreck constructed with carvel planking. Around 750 objects were recovered from the wreck including; cannon and cannonballs, wooden items, ballast stones, barrel staves and hoops, firewood, cordage, leather, textiles, seeds, bones, and early sixteenth century pottery. The ballast stones originate from the Basque region of Spain. The style of ship construction and the pottery indicate that the wreck dates to around 1520, and originates from Spain. It is believed that the ship was engaged in trade with England. Due to the tenuous relationship between Spain and England following Henry VIII's divorce from Catherine of Aragon in 1533, Spanish trade with England diminished significantly, and so the wreck likely predates this.

== Discovery and investigation ==
The site was discovered in 1983 by divers investigating a fisherman's net fastening. The wreck was excavated between 1984 and 1986, the heel of the keel was raised in 1986.

== Identity ==
The wreck was originally believed to be the Spanish Carrack San Salvador sunk in 1588, however this identity has since been discarded due to the presumed date of the vessel.
