= HMS Schiedam =

Ship of the line of the Royal Navy

HMS Schiedam was a Dutch East India fluyt. Captured twice, once by pirates, the ship wrecked off Gunwalloe Cove in 1684. The wreck is a Protected Wreck managed by Historic England.

== Career ==
Schiedam was captured by Moroccan pirates in 1683 off Gibraltar. She was then again captured by the British ship HMS Royal James on 10 August 1683 and used as a water carrier within ships of the line, renamed as the Schiedam Prize. She was then used as a transport ship to assist in the clearance of the Tangier Settlement.

== Wreck ==
While carrying naval workmen and their families, horses and cannon, she was lost off Gunwalloe Cove on her return to England on 4 April 1684.

The wreck was discovered on 10 July 1971 by Anthony Randall who, as the original licensee, undertook archaeological work on the site between 1971 and 1995. Over 150 artifacts have been recovered from the site, some of which are on display at the Charlestown Shipwreck & Heritage Centre.

In 2013, Historic England (then called English Heritage) commissioned a desk-based assessment of the wreck site's significance, its history, any existing evidence, finds and research work, concluding a discussion of potential threats.

A similar wreck was filmed at the same location for an episode of the BBC TV series Poldark in 2014.
