= Erme Ingot site =

Prehistoric ship wreck

Erme Ingot Site
- Interactive map of Erme Ingot Site
- 50°18′11″N 3°57′29″W
- Periods: Bronze age

Site notes
- Discovered: 1991

Between 1991 and 1992 an archaeological site containing tin ingots was uncovered close to West Mary's Rocks in Devon, England. Examination of the site revealed that these ingots may represent a wreck site, or the lost cargo from a ship. The ingots are believed to have been made before 1000 BC, during the later stages of the British Bronze Age. The site was designated under the Protection of Wrecks Act on 24 November 1993. The wreck is a Protected Wreck managed by Historic England. The ingots found here are an important source of knowledge for prehistoric tin.

== The site ==
The ingots were crudely made of almost pure tin. They were created using a mould in earth or sand, a method that dates to the Bronze Age. The ingots vary in size and weight; one of the largest measuring 41 cm x 21 cm x 6.5 cm and weighing 13 kg.

== Discovery and investigation ==
The site including seven ingots was discovered by divers from South-West Maritime Archaeology Group in 1991–1992. Further investigation has identified over 40 tin ingots present within the site.
