= Church Rocks Wreck =

Shipwreck near Teignmouth, Devon, England

Coordinates: 50°32′57″N 3°29′14″W

The remains of an unknown wreck were discovered on Church Rocks, off Teignmouth in 1975. The site was designated under the Protection of Wrecks Act on 3 August 1977. The wreck is a Protected Wreck managed by Historic England.

== The wreck ==
The site is the wreck of a late sixteenth century armed cargo vessel. It is believed to be that of a Venetian trading galley dating to after 1582 based on recovered artefacts. The identity of the wreck is unknown.

== Discovery and investigation ==
The site was discovered in 1975 approximately 150 m off-shore. Although the site was designated in 1977, prohibiting removal of artifacts without authorization, 120 round shot, six guns, three anchors, pottery shards, a gold seal, nails, a steelyard weight, and copper alloy pots were recovered from the site between 1975 and 1983. In 1996, the site was featured in an episode of UK archaeology programme Time Team.

In 2009, Historic England provided funding for conservation work for a number of artefacts recovered from the wreck.
