= Pwll Fanog wreck =

Shipwreck site in the Menai Strait, Wales

Coordinates: 53°12′46″N 4°11′43″W

The Pwll Fanog wreck is a small Medieval-era wooden vessel that sank in the Menai Strait, off the coast of Anglesey in Wales. The cargo vessel, believed to date to the later half of the 16th century, was carrying hand-worked slates which came to rest on top of the vessel itself when it sank.

The site was discovered in 1976 by Dr. Cecil Jones during a marine biological survey; it was designated under the Protection of Wrecks Act in 1978 and is a protected wreck managed by Cadw.

== History ==
The wooden vessel, measuring roughly 9.4 meters long, 3 meters wide and 1.5 meters tall, is of unknown identity, but could have been a type called a balinger. Experts believe it may have sunk while at anchor.

A sample of slates taken around the wreck's discovery were examined and determined to be likely from the Llanberis and Nantlle Valley areas. The number of slates estimated to be carried by the craft at the time it sank was somewhere between 20,000 and 40,000.

Scholars are not sure where it sailed from or was bound for, but in general the slates are believed to have been from a time when slate was being exported from North Wales in quantity, and could have been destined for Beaumaris.
