= Bartholomew Ledges Wreck =

Coordinates: 49°54′22″N 6°19′53″W

The Bartholomew Ledges Wreck is a wreck found in the late 1970s at St Mary's Sound, Isles of Scilly is believed to be that of a mid-sixteenth to early seventeenth century armed cargo vessel. The site was designated under the Protection of Wrecks Act on 23 September 1980. The wreck is a Protected Wreck managed by Historic England.

== The wreck ==
The wreck appears to be an armed cargo ship that grounded on Bartholomew Ledges and foundered. Spanish-type lead ingots likely dating to the sixteenth to early seventeenth century found within the vessel indicate that it is of Iberian origin, and possibly related to the Spanish Armada. Also found on the site were medieval bronze bell fragments that could be traced back to The Lord Nelson public house at Poole, Dorset. Further finds include breech-loading iron guns, anchors, pottery fragments, silver coins dating from 1474 to 1555, a gold seal, barrel spigots, iron and stone shot, buttons, and small lace brass objects.

== Discovery and investigation ==
The wreck site was found in the 1970s and was salvaged intensively until 1980 when salvage became prohibited after the designation of the wreck.

In 2003 the wreck was subject to an archaeological investigation which included the tagging of artefacts and survey of guns and anchors.

== Identity ==
It has been suggested that the wreck is that of the ‘Great Levantine’ San Bartolome which was part of the Armada fleet that left Ferrol on 8 October 1597, potentially giving the ledges their name. The fleet of 136 ships carrying 9000 troops sailed under Don Martin de Padilla to intercept an English fleet returning home. A storm sank 28 ships around 30 miles off the Lizard on 12 October.

Some evidence supports this hypothesis; the small wrought iron breech-loading swivel guns found on the wreck are comparable with those found on sixteenth century Spanish wrecks in the Americas, and the lead ingots recovered are similar to those found on other Armada wrecks in British and Irish waters. The anchors were also consistent with Iberian construction. While archaeological evidence does suggest that the wreck may be of Spanish or Spanish Netherlands origin, no evidence has been found that confirms the wreck's identity as that of San Bartolome.
