= Wheel Wreck =

Coordinates: 49°56′26.7″N 6°16′22.9″W

Approximate position of the wreck

The Wheel Wreck is the remains of a shipwreck lying in Crow Sound off Little Ganinick in the Isles of Scilly. The wreck site consists of a discrete mound of cargo that appears to consist of numerous sizes of different iron wheels, cogs, clack valves, tubes and boiler pipes. Lead scupper pipes and other small artefact material show the ship was once present; however, not much remains of this vessel today. A Trotman-style anchor lies some 60m from the site, and this, along with the cargo, dates the site to sometime just after 1835. It has been published that this may be the wreck of the Padstow; however, as the latter was lost in 1804, this can not be so, as neither boiler tubes nor Trotman anchors had been invented then. The wreck was discovered by local diver Todd Stevens in 2005 and investigated by the archaeological contractor for the Protection of Wrecks Act in 2006. It still remains unidentified. However, it is most likely to be a ship called the Plenty which is recorded locally as having sunk "within 1 mile of the principal island" in 1840.

The archaeological contractor has, however, identified the cargo as tin-mining equipment, presumed to have been from a foundry in Cornwall. This archaeological identification fortuitously came just after the designation of the Cornish tin mining areas as a World Heritage Site. The cargo find is considered particularly important, because such mining equipment no longer exists on land.

The site was designated under the Protection of Wrecks Act on 5 April 2007. The wreck is a Protected Wreck managed by Historic England.
