= Goodwins & Downs 8 =

Shipwreck in the English Channel in Kent, England

Coordinates: 51°13′58″N 1°26′01″E

The remains of an apparent armed wooden sailing vessel were identified in 2010 on The Downs, Kent, England. The site was designated under the Protection of Wrecks Act on 3 August 2012. The wreck is a Protected Wreck managed by Historic England.

== The wreck ==
The wreck consists of a coherent wooden structure including an area with flush laid planking, and a possible frame or beam. Further timbers beneath the planking were seen, but not further investigated. It is believed that this structure is part of the hull or deck of the vessel. Also, within the site were decorative timbers, possibly windows, door frames, or moulding for panelling. Seven cast iron smooth bore muzzle loading guns were also present within the site. A glass bottle found within the site was dated to between 1650 and 1750.

== Discovery and investigation ==
Investigations of the area in 2003 and 2009 did not identify the wreck. However, in 2010, sediment clearance exposed an area of structure that appeared to be coherent. The full extent of this structure was not revealed.

The site has been surveyed several times, with the latest multibeam survey being conducted in 2018.

== Identity ==
While the identity of the wreck is unknown, it has been suggested that it is the wreck of the Fourth rate Ship of the Line Carlisle which exploded in 1700. No archaeological evidence has been found to confirm this.
