= Hazardous (ship) =

Coordinates: 50°45′08″N 0°51′34″W

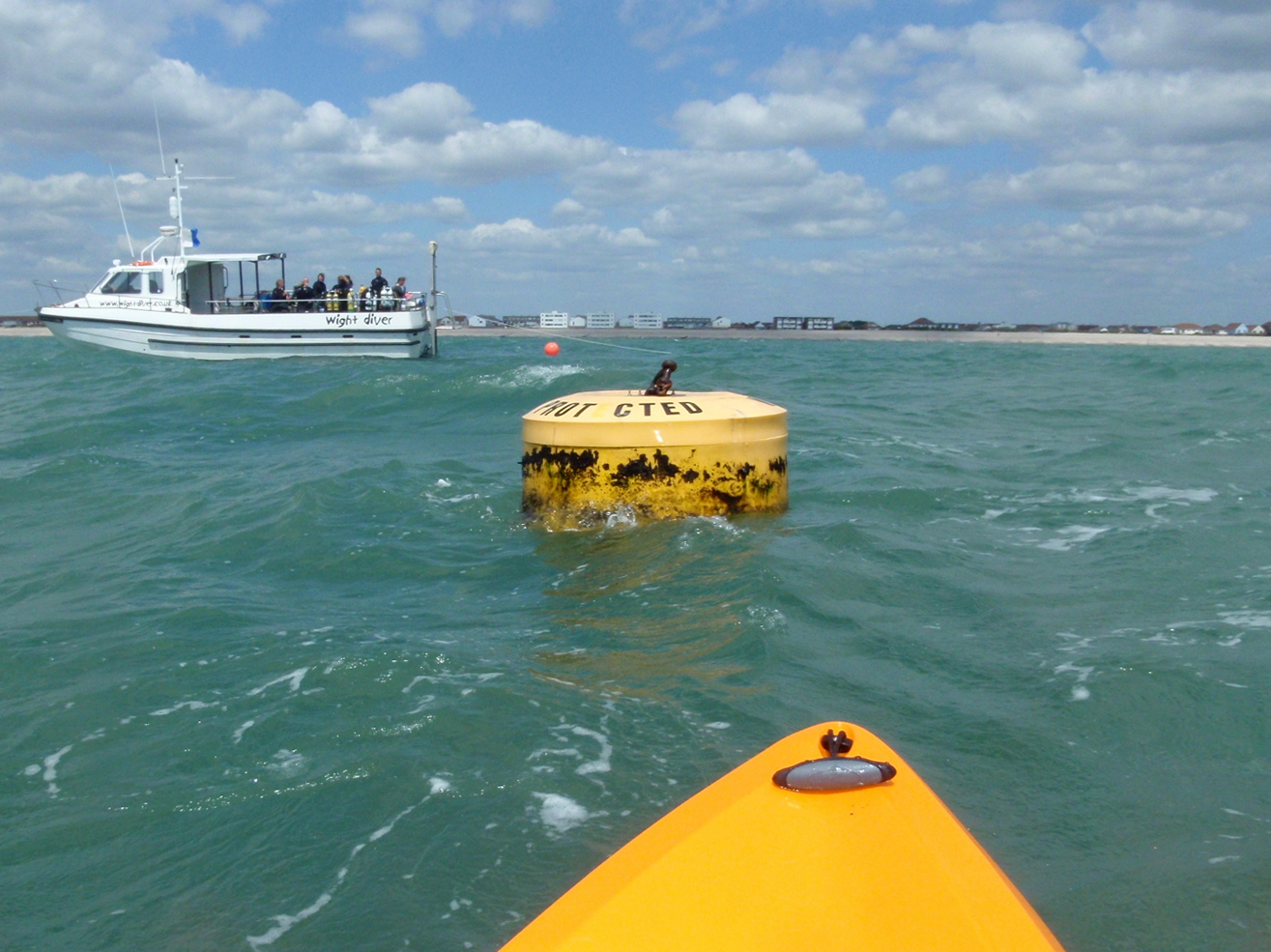
Wreck site of the Hazardous off the coast of Bracklesham Bay

The Hazardous, formerly Le Hazardeux, was a French third-rate ship of the line captured by the English and later wrecked in Bracklesham Bay, West Sussex, on her way back from Virginia. The wreck was found in 1977 by Buster Geary and George Arnold. In 1986 the site was designated under the Protection of Wrecks Act as a Protected Wreck, managed by Historic England.

== History ==
Designed by Pierre Coulomb and built in 1698 in Port-Louis, France, Le Hazardeux was a pine and oak 50-gun third-rate ship of the line. She was 137 ft long with a 38 ft beam and displaced 725 tons. She was launched in 1699 at Lorient.

Le Hazardeux was loaned to Jean-François Lévesque de Beaubriand (or Beaubriand-Lévesque) of St Malo for use as a privateer in 1703. Later in 1703 she was captured by the English ships Warspite and Orford and added to the Royal Navy as HMS Hazardous. Four further guns were added to her armament to make her a 54-gun ship.

In 1706, upon return from America as part of a 200-ship convoy, Hazardous went aground on a sandbank between Selsey and East Wittering, and was wrecked. Most of the crew survived.

== The wreck ==
The bow section of the hull lies to the north, and another section, believed to be the stern lies to the south. It appears that when the ship sank, the hull breached amidships.

== Discovery and investigation ==
A single cannon was recovered from the vicinity of the site in 1966 and further guns were identified in 1977. Excavations and surveys were undertaken in the 1980s which resulted in the recovery of late seventeenth to early eighteenth-century artefacts. Wessex Archaeology undertook remote sensing in 2014 which identified more cannon near the site. The designated area was therefore increased in order to protect these new finds.

Frequent surveying of the site is ongoing.
