= Diamond (1823 ship) =

Coordinates: 52.520°N 4.541°W

The Diamond was a three-masted square rigger, built in New York City in 1823. She was one of the first ships to operate a regular service for passenger and cargo between Britain and the United States. She sank en route to Liverpool from New York on 2 January 1825 in Cardigan Bay. The alleged wreck site was identified in 2000 and was designated under the Protection of Wrecks Act 1973 on 1 April 2002, the first such designation by the National Assembly for Wales. However, the identification has since been called into question.

== Construction and sailing life ==
When the Diamond was built in 1823, shipbuilding was undergoing rapid technological change. New materials and shipbuilding techniques were being used and ships of this period show many variations. The Diamond has been claimed (but without evidence) to have been the oldest known example of a composite American hull, where iron frames reinforce a timber frame and plank construction. The hull was sheathed in copper, to protect the timber planking from attack by marine organisms and reduce drag. This has proved to be totally false and without foundation. She is in fact a standard built vessel of the age constructed from white oak and locust wood sheathed in normal copper sheets fastened with copper tacks.

At 120 feet 9 inches (36.8 m) long, she was the forerunner of the ocean liners that would later regularly cross the Atlantic throughout the 19th and early-to-mid-20th centuries.

== Wreck ==
The Diamond sailed on her last voyage from New York on 12 December 1824, captained by Henry Macy. She was bound for Liverpool with about 30 passengers and a cargo of cotton, potash, and apples. She also carried international mail. On 2 January 1825 she struck a notorious reef, Sarn Badrig (St Patrick's Causeway) in Cardigan Bay, and sank in 14 metres (46 ft) of water. Her masts and spars were therefore out of the water and in plain sight. Lifeboats that rowed from Barmouth saved most of the passengers.

== Alleged discovery and protection ==
In 2000, two local divers and amateur archaeological historians, Tony Iles and his daughter Helen, located a wreck through magnetometer survey. On diving the site, they found wooden frames reinforced with iron. They conducted a preliminary survey that showed the wreck to be in excess of 150 feet long, and reported the find to Cadw. They recovered Muntz Metal (also known as "Yellow Metal") pins and sheathing from the wreck. The Archaeological Diving Unit, under the Protection of Wrecks Act 1973, then investigated the wreck using side-scan sonar and ROV. As a result of various erroneous claims and uncorroborated information from a third party to Cadw stating that the Diamond was an early composite-hulled vessel (subsequently shown to be false) the site was evaluated for designation under the Protection of Wrecks Act 1973.

Despite the obvious physical anomalies on the site survey with the known information on the Diamond and the disputed information of its construction, Cadw erred on the side of caution. On 1 April 2002 it declared the wreck to be the Diamond. This was the first designation in Wales since powers were devolved to the National Assembly for Wales, and hence the first designation by a Welsh statutory instrument. This has prevented all recreational divers, other than those listed under the relevant licences, from diving at the site or wreck.

== Further investigation and challenge to identity ==
Ian Cundy of the Malvern Archaeological Diving Unit was granted a licence to investigate the wreck site in July 2002. His findings cast serious doubt on whether the designated wreck site is that of the Diamond, as it appears to be that of a larger and later (unidentified) vessel. The wreck appears to be 160 ft long (49 m), and there are discrepancies between samples of the materials (timber and hull sheathing) recovered from the site and those listed as used for the Diamond. Metal samples scattered on the site are stamped Muntz Metal, an alloy not patented until 1832, several years after the loss of the Diamond. Dendrochronological samples (2006) taken from the main ribs and professionally analysed show that the wood was still growing in 1825 at the date of the wreck of the Diamond, and was not felled until around 1840. Cardigan Bay has been the graveyard of so many ships that identifying possible other candidates for the designated wreck site, and excluding the rest, may take some time. The project to identify this shipwreck is still ongoing.
