= Iona II =

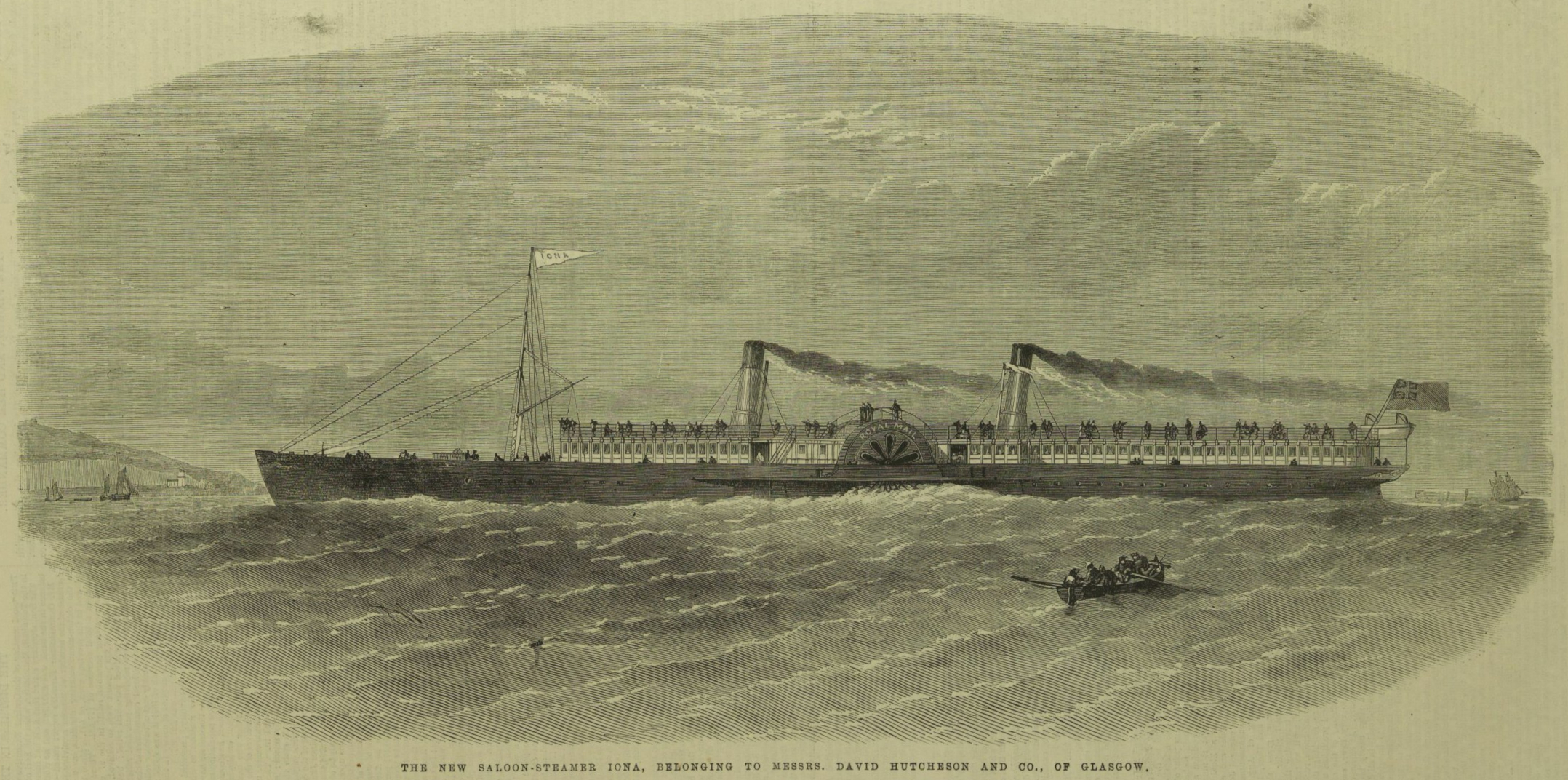

The Iona II was a nineteenth-century American paddle steamer that sank off the English island of Lundy in 1864. The site was designated under the Protection of Wrecks Act on 6 December 1989. The wreck is a Protected Wreck managed by Historic England.

== History ==
Iona II was built in 1863 at Govan by James and George Thompson and was capable of 24 knots, having been fitted with a 2-cylinder oscillating engine fitted with tubular boilers and superheaters. She was built to work on the River Clyde between Glasgow and Ardrishaig and was fitted with luxury accommodation for passengers, including a 75 ft dining room and 180 ft saloon.

Within a year of service, Iona II was purchased by Charles Hopkins Boster of Virginia to be a Confederate blockade runner. She was travelling to Kingston from the Clyde when she took on water and foundered off Lundy Island, North Devon.

== The wreck ==
Iona II lies upright on the seabed. The forward and aft boilers, sections of a funnel, and the engine are all intact, as well as the hull up to the turn of the bilge. She is missing the majority of her funnels, the deckhouses, and the masts.

== Discovery and investigation ==
Salvage of the wreck was attempted shortly after the wrecking of the ship. The site was rediscovered during the search for the sunken MV Robert in 1976.

The site was assessed for designation by the Archaeological Diving Unit in 1989, and in 1990 Potters Bar Sub Aqua Club performed a photographic survey. The site was frequently surveyed between 1991 and 2012.

In 2002 Malvern Archaeological Diving Unit surveyed the site, and the Archaeological Diving Unit undertook a side-scan sonar survey.
