= Hanover (ship) =

Coordinates: 50°20′7.57″N 5°11′2.74″W

History

Great Britain
- Name: Hanover
- Launched: 1757
- Fate: Wrecked, 13 December 1763

General characteristics
- Type: Brigantine
- Length: 100 ft (30 m)

One of a pair of 17th-century Spanish cannons salvaged from the ballast of the Hanover, now installed in Takapuna, Auckland, New Zealand.

Hanover was a two-masted brigantine packet ship owned and operated by the Falmouth Post Office Packet Service, which operated between 1688 and 1852.

On 13 December 1763, under the command of Captain Joseph Sherbourne and en route from Lisbon to Falmouth, she was driven ashore by a gale. There were only three survivors out of 27 crew and 40 passengers. The location, near Perranporth has become known as Hanover Cove as a result. At the time she was carrying a large amount of gold and valuables; historical evidence suggests that this was mostly recovered around the time of the wrecking.

The wreck made legal history, when in 1765 an iron trunk containing bullion was recovered. The insurers had already paid out on the loss and the case established that where insurers paid out on cargo and the owners subsequently recovered their property, the insurers were entitled to a refund.

The wreck was discovered by local diver Colin Martin in 1994 following changes in the seabed and was identified by means of recovery of the ship's bell. The Post Office Limited, previously the General Post Office, as owners of the wreck paid for an archaeological investigation and recommended in 1996 that it should be protected under the Protection of Wrecks Act. However, protection was not granted. It was not until 19 July 1997, that the wreck site received emergency designation following the recovery of some fifty guns and the destabilisation of the wreck by a salvage rig set up next to it. The finder was subsequently licensed to excavate under archaeological supervision with the intention of displaying finds in a local shipwreck museum. Musket, shot, ship-fittings and the Captain's ring have also been brought to the surface. The wreck site has since been protected by return of the sand covering.The wreck is a Protected Wreck managed by Historic England.

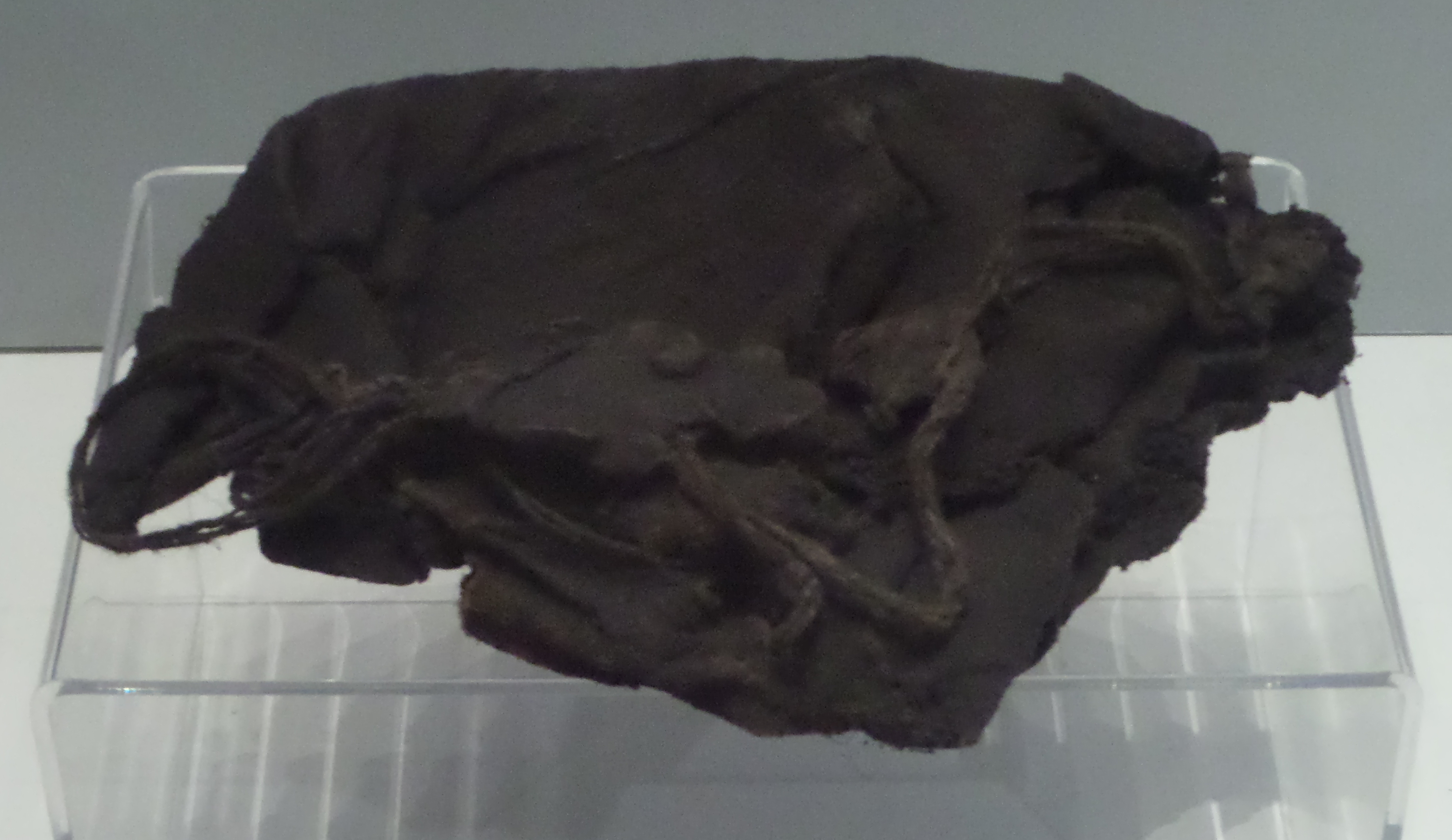
Drawstring bag for gunpowder

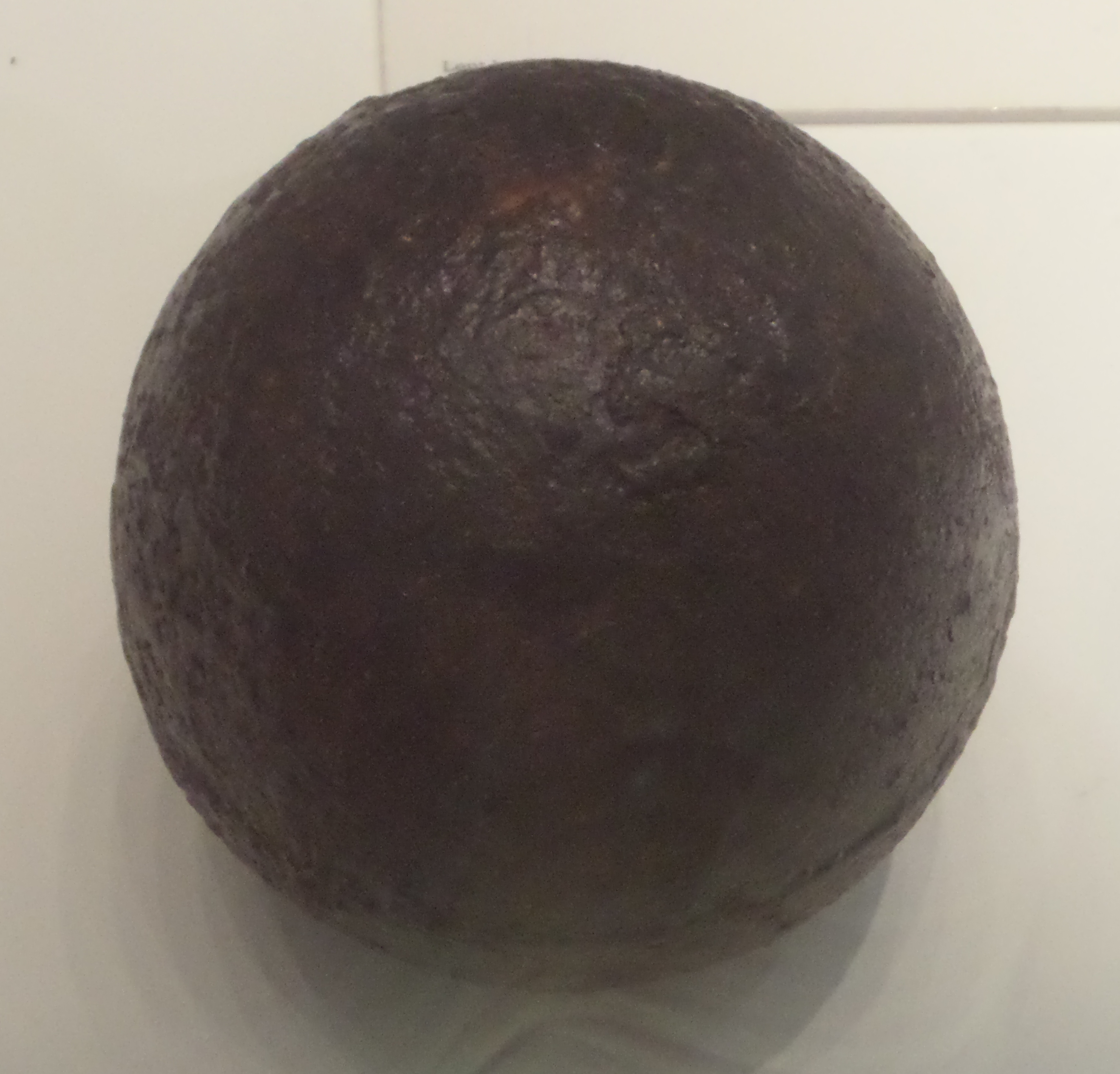
Six pound cannon ball

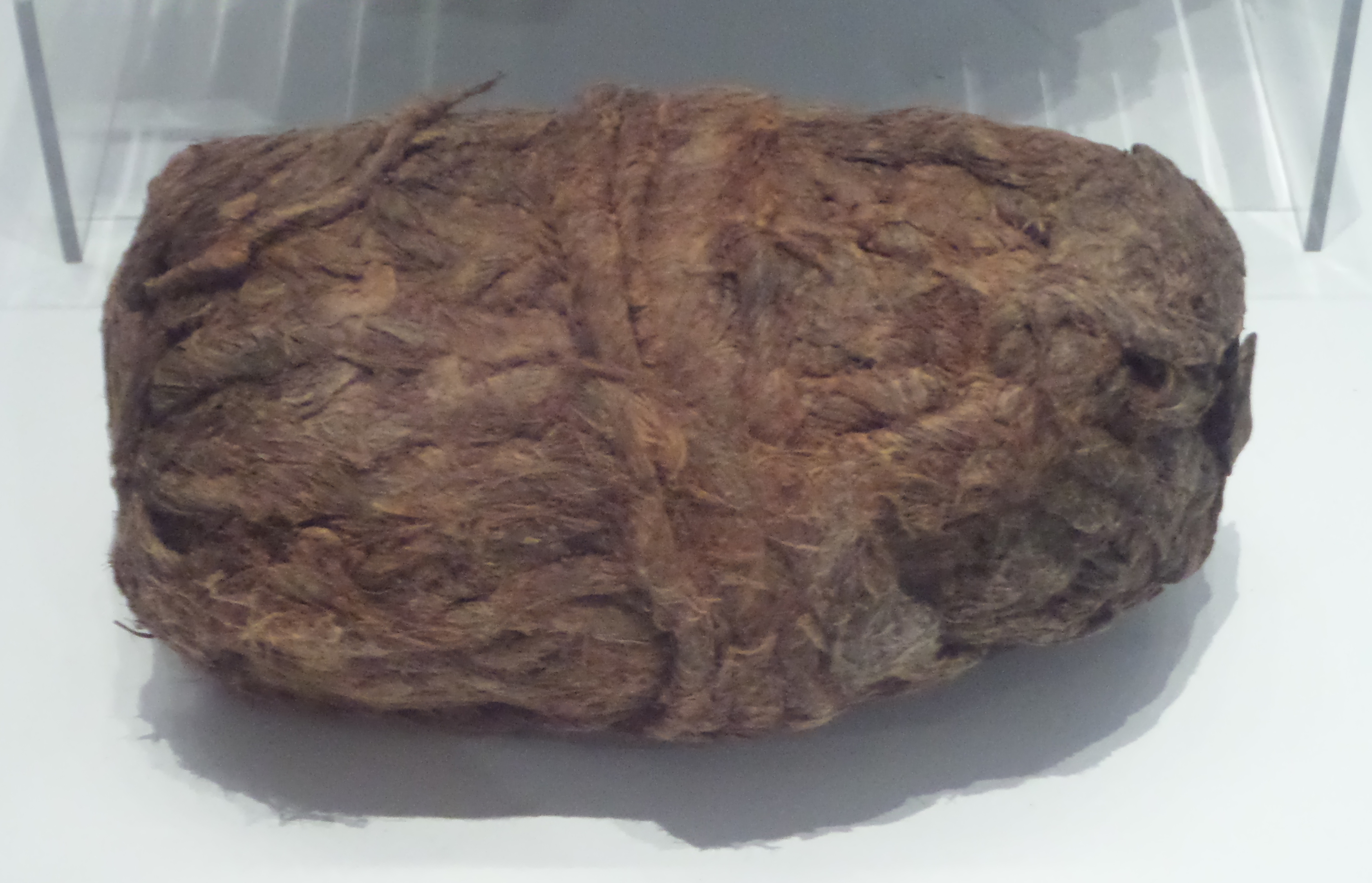
Wadding found inside a loaded cannon

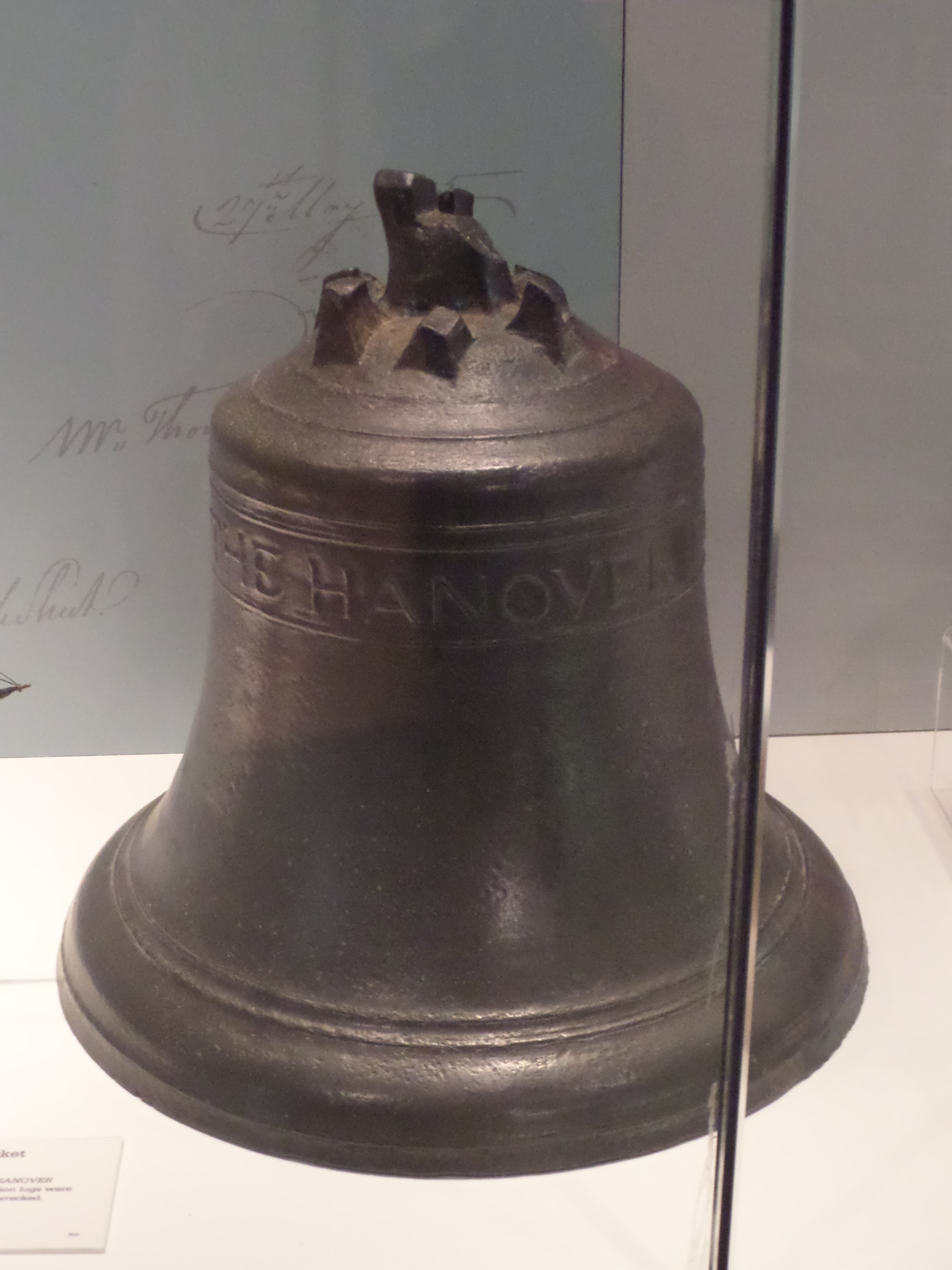
Ship's bell marked "HANOVER PAQUET 1757; the suspension lugs were torn off when the ship was wrecked

In 2016, Cotswold Archaeology was commissioned by Historic England to use marine assessment to investigate the possible de-designation on three designated wreck sites, including the Hanover. Some doubt had been raised in earlier reports as to the definitive identification of the wreck as the Hanover, and criticism was made of the way the salvage from the wreck had been undertaken, with a failure to record finds and information in a professional manner.

== See also ==
- Protection of Wrecks Act
- Archaeology of shipwrecks
- List of designations under the Protection of Wrecks Act
