= Rill Cove Wreck =

Wreck off Cornwall, England

Coordinates: 49.976°N 5.241°W

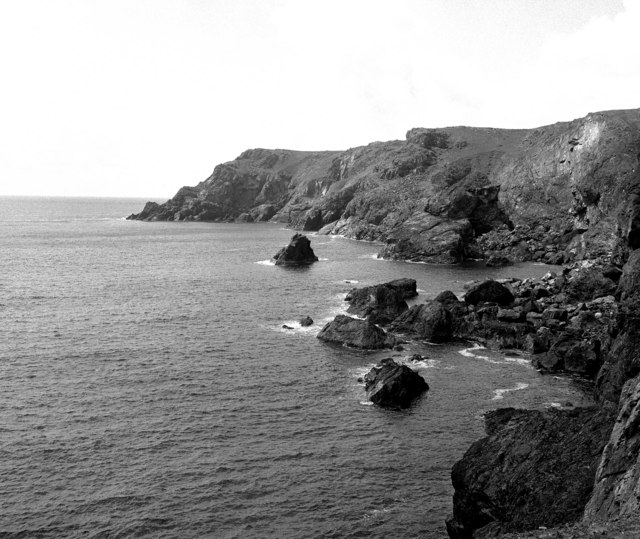
The coast west of Kynance Cove

The Rill Cove Wreck is an underwater wreck of a 16th-century Spanish cargo ship lying off the coast of Rill Cove, west of Kynance Cove, in Cornwall, England, UK.

The remains of a cargo vessel were first found off Rill Cove, Cornwall in 1969. The site was designated under the Protection of Wrecks Act on 13 February 1976. The wreck is a Protected Wreck managed by Historic England.

This wreck has also been identified by some as the Lizard Silver Wreck, a celebrated 1619 wreck off nearby Lizard Point, but this is disputed.

== The wreck ==
The site consists of iron cannon, a wrought iron swivel gun, a banded breech-loading gun, and other wreck material including over 300 sixteenth century coins. A number of these coins were of Spanish origin, stamped with Philip II or Philip III, which date from 1555–98 and 1598-1603/5 respectively. The identity of the vessel is unknown but it is believed to be a Spanish cargo vessel that foundered around 1616.

== Discovery and investigation ==
The site was discovered by divers who were investigating a nearby modern wreck in 1969. The site has been frequently visited, with further artefacts being recovered. In 2013, a desk-based assessment was undertaken which involved assessing the significance of the site.
