= Cattewater Wreck =

Shipwreck off Plymouth, Devon, England

Coordinates: 50°21′43″N 4°07′42″W

Cattewater Wreck is a wooden three-masted, skeleton-built vessel, one of many ships that have wrecked in Cattewater, Plymouth Sound, England. This wreck is close to the entrance of Sutton Harbour, its name is still unknown but it is believed to be from the 16th century. It is a Protected Wreck managed by Historic England.

== History ==
The wreck was found in 1973 when a dredger being used to deepen the Cattewater brought up timber wreckage and parts of some iron guns. An underwater investigation of the site in 1973 was instigated by the National Maritime Museum and the department for the Environment. The investigation produced a provisional site plan and included the more controlled recovery of loose wreckage including concreted fragments of an iron muzzle loading cannon. The hull structure was the lowest section of hull from one end past the midships area, where the dredging work had caused extensive damage. Based on the assessments the site was recommended for designation under the British Protection of Wrecks Act 1973 and the site was designated under order No 1. Further recording and excavation work on the site was carried out between 1974 and 1978. A substantial portion of the structure and a wide variety of finds were recovered, including pottery, worked wood, a brass pin and buckle, various lead objects, leather, rope, textiles, animal bone and a number of wrought iron stave built guns on sledges. The present knowledge is based on less than 50% of the surviving structure.

The Cattewater ship belongs to a period of developing ship design bordering the revolution in naval construction taking place around 1480 to 1525 and the appearance of the first English evidence for mathematically based formula for ship lines c. 1580. Positive identification of the ship has not been possible although the archaeological evidence strongly suggests an early 16th-century merchantman of between 200 and 300 tons burthen.

== Recent work ==
More recent work has been undertaken on the site by the University of Plymouth and 3H Consulting Ltd. The site was resurveyed in 2006 using a sub-bottom profiler and in 2007 using a multibeam echo sounder, sidescan sonar and a caesium magnetometer. The survey work identified a number of magnetic and sub-bottom targets around the site and also determined the correct position for the remaining hull structure. Part of this work involved constructing and publishing a comprehensive and integrated digital model of the site in Site Recorder that includes all the data from previous fieldwork along with data from recent geophysical surveys.

== See also ==
- Protection of Wrecks Act 1973
