= Charlestown Shipwreck & Heritage Centre =

Historical museum in Cornwall, England

Coordinates: 50.3327°N 4.7568°W

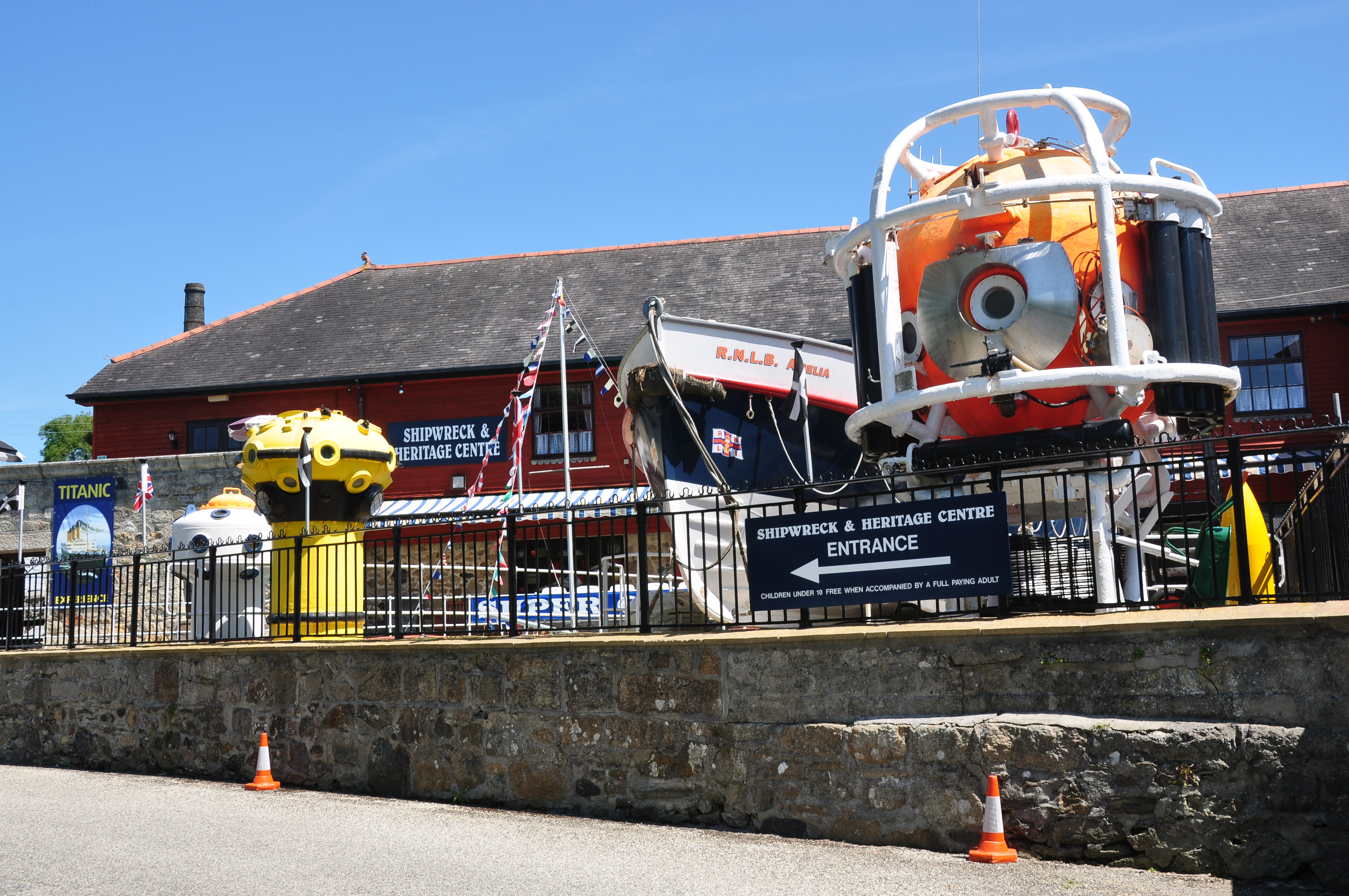
Charlestown Shipwreck and Heritage Centre

The Shipwreck Treasure Museum (previously the Charlestown Shipwreck & Heritage Centre) located in Charlestown, Cornwall, England, was a historical museum housing over 8,000 artifacts from 165 different shipwrecks. Artifacts included the only intact barrel of coins ever recovered from a wreck, and items relating to famous shipwrecks, including the RMS Titanic and HMS Victory.

The museum was acquired by Sir Tim Smit in 2017. Under his leadership, the museum was expanded to include Charlestown Harbour, a UNESCO World Heritage Site.

In October 2019, a historic network of tunnels beneath the museum were reopened to the public as 'Charlestown Underground'. The tunnels were created to transport china clay, as part of St Austell’s china clay industry.

The museum closed in late 2024 with its last event, a "Tunnel of Lights" experience for Christmas, running on December 31, 2024.
