= SS Castilian (1919) =

British cargo steamship sunk in 1943

Coordinates: 53°25.0107′N 4°35.9176′W

History

United Kingdom
- Name: Castilian
- Owner: Westcott & Laurance Line
- Operator: Ellerman Lines
- Port of registry: London
- Builder: Sir Raylton Dixon & Co
- Yard number: 618
- Launched: 26 June 1919
- Completed: 1919
- Identification: UK official number 143384; code letters KCJF (until 1933); Call sign GBVX (from 1934)
- Fate: wrecked on rocks 12 February 1943

General characteristics
- Class & type: Shipping Controller Type C
- Tonnage: 3,067 GRT; tonnage under deck 2,836; 1,849 NRT
- Length: 331.3 ft (101.0 m)
- Beam: 46.8 ft (14.3 m)
- Depth: 23.2 ft (7.1 m)
- Decks: 2
- Installed power: 310 NHP
- Propulsion: triple-expansion steam engine
- Speed: 11.5 knots (21.3 km/h)

SS Castilian was a British cargo steamship and is now a dangerous wreck in the Irish Sea off the coast of North Wales. She was built in 1919 to a standard First World War design. In 1943 while carrying munitions she struck rocks off The Skerries, Isle of Anglesey and sank.

An exclusion zone under section 2 of the Protection of Wrecks Act 1973 (Prohibition on approaching dangerous wrecks) forbids scuba diving within 500 metres (1,600 ft) of the wreck because her explosive cargo remains dangerous.

== Namesakes ==
Castilian was owned by Westcott & Laurance Line, a subsidiary of Ellerman Lines. She was the second of three Ellerman ships to bear the name.

Ellerman's first Castilian had been Bullard, King & Co's Umbilo, which Ellerman bought in 1909 and renamed. SM U-61 torpedoed and sank her in the North Atlantic northwest of Ireland in 1917.

Ellerman's third Castilian was built for the company in 1955. From 1963 onwards she was renamed several times. In 1971 she was sold to Maldivian-registered owners and renamed Maldive Freedom.

Other earlier ships have been named Castilian but were not Ellerman ships.

== History ==
Sir Raylton Dixon & Company built the ship in Middlesbrough to the Shipping Controller's standard Type C design. Richardsons Westgarth & Company supplied her triple-expansion steam engine.

The Shipping Controller named all merchant ships with the prefix "War". Sources disagree as to whether Castilian was built as War Acacia or War Ocean.

Castilian's UK official number was 143384. Until 1933 her code letters were KCJF. In 1934 these were replaced with the wireless Call sign GBVX.

In the Second World War Castilian sailed between Britain, Gibraltar and Allied ports in the Mediterranean from September 1939 until June 1940. From July 1940 until November 1942 she repeatedly crossed the North Atlantic: sailing west in OB and ON convoys and returning from Canada or the USA in HX or SC convoys. In November 1942 she sailed from Milford Haven to Gibraltar, returning in January 1943.

On 11 February 1943 Castilian, laden with munitions, left Liverpool unescorted. The next day she struck rocks off The Skerries, Isle of Anglesey and sank.

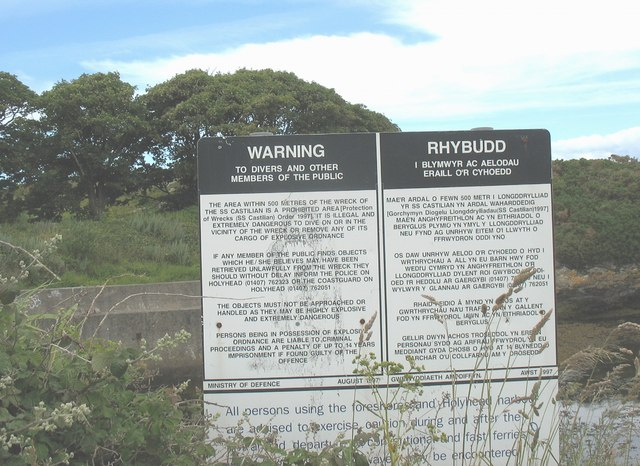
An MoD warning sign at Porth y Felin

== Wreck ==
In 1987, a Royal Navy clearance vessel spent several months removing unexploded ordnance, believed to have come from the wreck, from nearby Fydlyn Bay.

In 1997, the site of the wreck on East Platters Rocks was designated under section 2 of the Protection of Wrecks Act 1973 (Prohibition on approaching dangerous wrecks) because of her dangerous cargo. An exclusion zone prohibits scuba diving within 500-metre (1,600 ft) of the wreck.

== See also ==
- SS Kielce – 1946 shipwreck in the English Channel that exploded during a salvage operation in 1967
- SS Richard Montgomery – 1944 shipwreck in the Thames Estuary that still contains a dangerous cargo of explosives.
