= HMS Coronation =

90-gun second-rate ship of the line of the English Royal Navy

Coordinates: 50.3167°N 4.1833°W

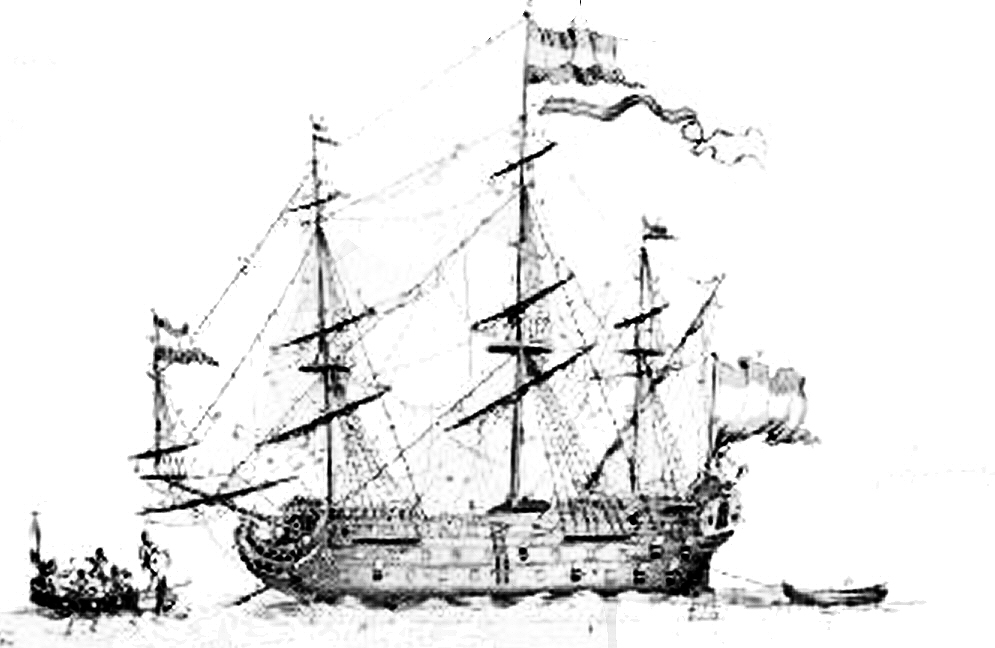
- Coronation

History

England
- Name: Coronation
- Ordered: 1678
- Builder: Isaac Betts, Portsmouth Dockyard
- Launched: 23 May 1685
- Commissioned: 14 February 1690
- Fate: Wrecked, 3 September 1691

General characteristics
- Class & type: 90-gun second-rate ship of the line
- Tons burthen: 1,345 (bm)
- Length: 160 ft 4 in (48.9 m) (gundeck)
- Beam: 44 ft 9 in (13.6 m)
- Depth of hold: 18 ft 2 in (5.5 m)
- Sail plan: Full-rigged ship
- Armament: 90 guns of various weights of shot

Coronation was a 90-gun second-rate ship of the line of the English Royal Navy, built at Portsmouth Dockyard as part of the '30 great ships programme' of 1677, and launched in 1685. She was lost in a storm off Rame Head, Cornwall on 3 September 1691 and is designated under the Protection of Wrecks Act 1973. The wreck is a Protected Wreck managed by Historic England.

== Service ==
Coronation was commissioned on 14 February 1690 under Captain John Munden, as the flagship of Vice-Admiral Sir Ralph Delavall, under whom she took part in the Battle of Beachy Head, against the French, on 30 June 1690. The French won the battle and had temporary control of the English Channel. Captain Charles Skelton took command of the ship on 29 October 1690.

== Loss ==
On 3 September 1691 Coronation was patrolling the channel with the English Fleet and made for Plymouth. The exact circumstances are unclear but it is thought she dragged her anchors while trying to sit out a south-east gale in the lee of Rame Head and was driven aground in Lady Cove to the west of Penlee Point; approximately 600 men drowned, including Skelton. Only about twenty survived.

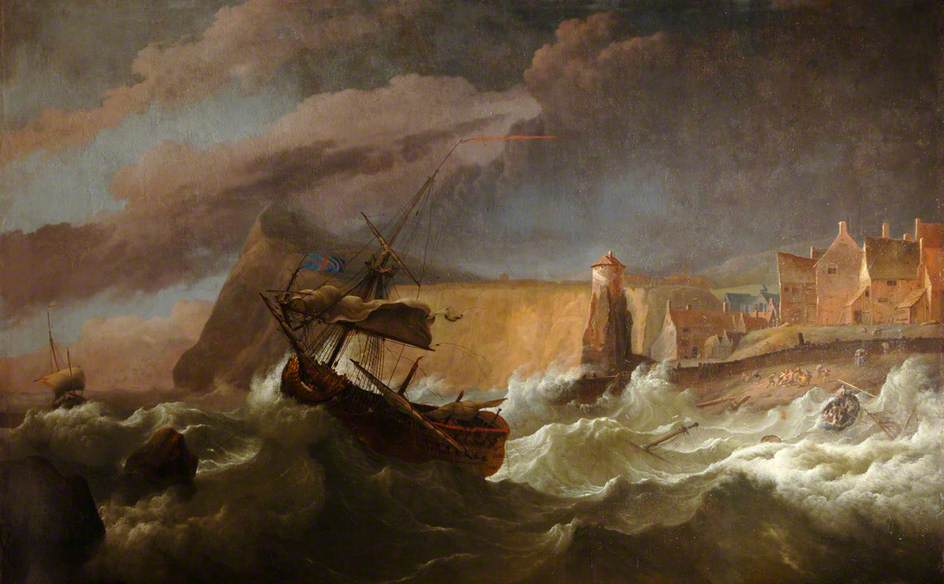
The foundering of Coronation, by Ludolf Bakhuizen

== Wreck ==
Part of the wreck was discovered, close to the shore in 1967 and a second offshore site was found in 1977. The area is subject to strong tidal flows, especially during spring tides. The main wreck site extends in a south-west direction, over 1300m, from the southern side of Penlee Point and artefacts are spread over a large area. The site is a protected wreck and a licence is required to dive on the site.
