= HMS Royal Anne Galley =

Frigate of the Royal Navy

History

Great Britain
- Name: HMS Royal Anne Galley
- Namesake: Anne, Queen of Great Britain
- Builder: Woolwich Dockyard
- Launched: 1709
- Completed: 1709
- Fate: Wrecked on 10 November 1721

General characteristics
- Class & type: fifth-rate frigate
- Tonnage: 511bm
- Length: 38.7 metres (127 ft 0 in)
- Beam: 6.4 metres (21 ft 0 in)
- Sail plan: Full-rigged ship
- Crew: 182
- Notes: Captain Francis Willis

HMS Royal Anne Galley was a 42-gun fifth-rate frigate of the Royal Navy. She ran aground and was wrecked during a gale off Lizard Point, Cornwall, while she was travelling to the West Indies. The wreck is a Protected Wreck managed by Historic England.

== Construction ==
Royal Anne Galley was constructed and launched in 1709 at Woolwich Dockyard. She was named Royal Anne Galley after Anne, Queen of Great Britain, and served from 1709 until her loss in 1721. The ship was 38.7 metres (127 ft 0 in) long, with a beam of 6.4 metres (21 ft 0 in) and the ship was assessed at 511bm. She had 42 cannons and was the Royal Navy's last oared fighting ship.

== Sinking ==
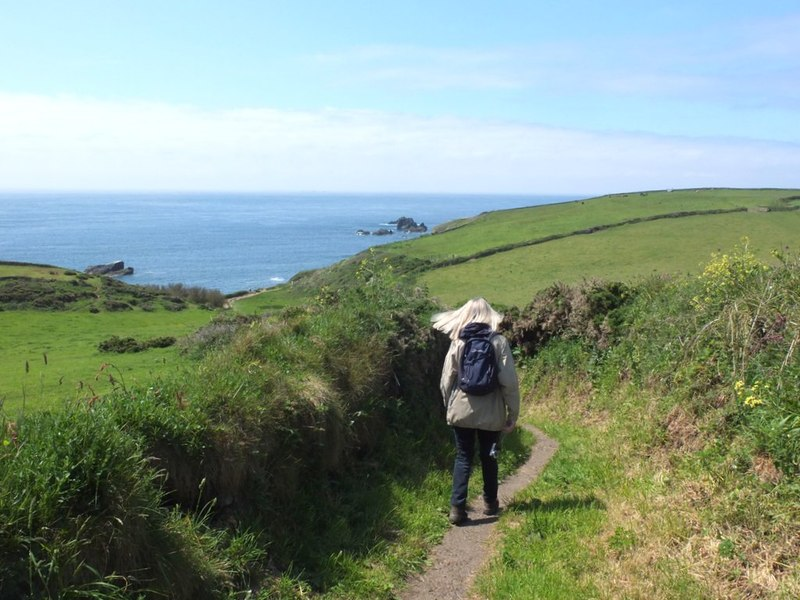
Polpeor Cove, and Stag Rocks. The path leads down to Pistil Meadow which is thought by some to be the burial site of the 198 (right side of the path) when the Galley was lost on the nearby rocks

On 10 November 1721, HMS Royal Anne Galley was on a voyage from the UK to the West Indies with John Hamilton, 3rd Lord Belhaven and Stenton, the new Governor of Barbados on board, when bad weather forced the ship to return to port in Falmouth. Before they could return, Royal Anne Galley was in the eye of the storm and she was wrecked on the Stag Rocks on Lizard Point, Cornwall. Of the 200 passengers and crew, only two survived the sinking. Lord Belhaven was amongst those killed. It is believed by some that their bodies were buried by locals in Pistil Meadow as they were washed up, although others dispute this.

== Wreck ==
The wreck of the ship lies at (49°55′N 5°12′W) and was found near Lizard Point by a local diver, Robert Sherratt in 1991. Artefacts that were raised include cutlery bearing Lord Belhaven's family crest.
