= Wessex Archaeology =

British archaeological and heritage services company

Wessex Archaeology Limited
- Company type: Charity, Private company limited by guarantee
- Industry: Archaeology; Cultural Heritage
- Founded: 1 May 1979
- Headquarters: Salisbury, United Kingdom
- Services: Services list: Archaeological Survey; Excavation; Coastal and Marine Archaeology; Archaeological Computing; Heritage Management; Rescue Archaeology; Archaeological Consultancy; Post-excavation Analysis
- Number of employees: 360 (2023)
- Website: www.wessexarch.co.uk

Wessex Archaeology is a British company that provides archaeological and heritage services, as well as being an educational charity. Apart from advice and consultancy, it also does fieldwork and publishes research on the sites it surveys. The company has had a long association with the archaeological television programme Time Team.

Wessex Archaeology is a Chartered Institute for Archaeologists Registered Organisation.

== History ==
Founded in 1979 as the Wessex Archaeological Committee, its name was changed in 1983 to the Trust for Wessex Archaeology. It was one of the first rescue archaeology units in the country, focussing on the numerous sites in and around Salisbury Plain. In 2005, it was renamed Wessex Archaeology Limited, trading as "Wessex Archaeology".

Since the advent of developer-funded archaeology with PPG 16 and its successor, PPS5, it has expanded its commercial operations across the UK with offices in Gravesend and Sheffield. WA opened its Scottish office in Edinburgh in 2010. It includes a large marine archaeology department. Further regional offices were opened in Welshpool and Bristol in 2014.

== Charitable aims ==
Wessex Archaeology is a registered charity with stated aims: "to promote the advancement of the education of the public in the subjects of culture, arts, heritage and science through the pursuit of archaeology".

The results of its archaeological investigations are lodged with local authorities via the Archaeology Data Service's OASIS system and reports can be accessed online through their online library.

== Notable people ==
Phil Harding, who appeared on the archaeological television programme Time Team, works for Wessex Archaeology.
