= Protection of Wrecks Act 1973 =

Act of the Parliament of the United Kingdom

Protection of Wrecks Act 1973 (Note: Section 4.)
- Act of Parliament
- Parliament of the United Kingdom
- Long title: An Act to secure the protection of wrecks in territorial waters and the sites of such wrecks, from interference by unauthorised persons; and for connected purposes.
- Citation: 1973 c. 33
- Introduced by: Iain Sproat (Commons)
- Territorial extent: United Kingdom

Dates
- Royal assent: 18 July 1973
- Commencement: 18 July 1973 (Note: The Acts of Parliament (Commencement) Act 1793.)
Other legislation
Amended by	Marine (Scotland) Act 2010

Status: Partially repealed

Text of statute as originally enacted

Revised text of statute as amended

Text of the Protection of Wrecks Act 1973 as in force today (including any amendments) within the United Kingdom, from legislation.gov.uk.

The Protection of Wrecks Act 1973 (c. 33) is an act of the Parliament of the United Kingdom which provides protection for designated shipwrecks.

Section 1 of the act provides for wrecks to be designated because of historical, archaeological or artistic value. Section 2 provides for designation of dangerous sites. Wreck sites must have a known location in order to be designated. Designated wrecks are marked on admiralty charts and their physical location is sometimes marked by means of a buoy (sea mark). Information boards are often provided at nearby launch points on land.

== Wrecks designated by virtue of historical, archaeological or artistic value ==
It is a criminal offence to interfere with a wreck designated under section 1 of the act without a licence. Navigation, angling and bathing are permitted provided this will not interfere with the wreck. A licence is required to dive at the wreck site. Separate licences are required for any disturbance, such as recovery of artifacts or underwater excavation. Licences to survey, visit etc. can be obtained by applying online to Historic England, to Cadw, and formerly by Historic Scotland.

Anchoring on the wreck site is also not permitted except in accordance with licensed activities. The area designated may extend beyond the visible remains.

Designation and licensing under section 1 of the act is managed by Historic England, Cadw and formerly by Historic Scotland.

The first wreck to be designated was the Cattewater Wreck at Plymouth, in 1973. As of July 2007 there were 60 wreck sites under current protection under section 1 of the act. Two sites that had at some point been designated have subsequently been revoked.

== Identifying protected wreck sites ==
All protected wrecks are listed in the annual Admiralty Notices to Mariners and are marked on United Kingdom Hydrographic Office charts. A statutory instrument shows the location of the site and also the extent of the restricted protected area. This is often done using a buoy, (usually yellow and inscribed 'Protected Wreck') although sites that are close to the shore may have notices on land which not only serve to warn, but often also describe why the wreck is important (e.g. on the National Trust path at the Salcombe Moor Sand / Salcombe Cannon site).

Despite this, criminal damage to protected wrecks is reported frequently. Artefacts from the site of the British warship HMS Coronation, off Penlee Point, were allegedly stolen in 2011, and arrests were made in April 2011 over thefts from the warship HMS London.

== Wrecks designated as dangerous ==
As of July 2008, only two wrecks are designated as dangerous under section 2 of the act. These are the SS Richard Montgomery (designated in 1973), and the SS Castilian (designated in 1997), in both cases due to containing large amounts of explosives. The MV Braer was also protected from 1993, until the order was revoked in 1994. Designation provides for an exclusion zone for all activities around the wreck. Diving is strictly prohibited on these dangerous wrecks. Designation and control under section 2 of the act is managed by the Maritime and Coastguard Agency.

== Wrecks protected by other means ==
A number of wreck sites have been protected under the Ancient Monuments and Archaeological Areas Act 1979 as maritime scheduled monuments. These are:

- The remains of the scuttled German High Seas Fleet in Scapa Flow
- The remains of eight historic fishing vessels in Aberlady Bay
- The Louisa, at Grangetown, Cardiff
- HMS D1, near Dartmouth, Devon

All wrecked aircraft and a number of designated military shipwrecks are protected as military maritime graves, i.e. war graves under the Protection of Military Remains Act 1986. This is administered by the UK Ministry of Defence. Maritime sites other than wrecks, such as fish traps, may also be protected by scheduling.

== Lists of wrecks ==
As of 2011, there were 61 historic protected wreck sites designated in the UK, although this is only a tiny fragment of the wrecks that are known to exist. There are 46 in English and Welsh waters and there were fifteen in Scottish waters – eight of these were designated under the 1973 act, whilst the remains of the German High Seas Fleet are protected under the Ancient Monuments and Archaeological Areas Act 1979. All Scottish designations under the 1973 Act were subsequently revoked in 2013 (see devolution).

There is a searchable list of all protected wreck sites in England available online using the National Heritage List for England. Cadw has a list on its website of the sites in Wales.

== Falkland Islands protected wrecks ==
On 7 July 1977 the legislature of the overseas territory of the Falkland Islands passed an ordinance similar to the UK Protection of Wrecks Act, allowing for the protection of wrecks in colonial waters that are either of historical, archaeological or artistic importance (section 3), or are dangerous (section 4). On 20 October 1983, an order was passed under the ordinance, designating the areas around the wrecks of HMS Ardent and HMS Antelope, lying in Falkland Sound and San Carlos Water, respectively as prohibited places under section 4. On 3 November 2006, an order came into force to designate the area around the wreck of HMS Coventry as a restricted area. These three ships had been sunk during the Falklands War.

== Devolution ==
The Secretary of State's functions under section 1 of the act, regarding the administration of 'wrecks designated by virtue of historical, archaeological or artistic value' were transferred to the Scottish and Welsh governments as a result of devolution in the United Kingdom.

Section 1 no longer applies in Scotland; it was repealed by paragraph 4 of schedule 4 to the Marine (Scotland) Act 2010, which came into force on 1 November 2013, and its provisions replaced by a system of 'historic marine protected areas'. Additionally, an order made in 2013 under the 2010 Act revoked all the original section 1 designation orders that applied to wrecks situated in Scotland.

The administration of 'wrecks designated as dangerous' under section 2 was not devolved and remains a reserved matter as regards Scotland and Wales.

== See also ==
- Archaeology of shipwrecks
- Maritime archaeology
- Wreck diving
