= Salcombe (disambiguation) =

Salcombe is a resort town in the South Hams district of Devon, south west England.

Salcombe may also refer to:

- Salcombe Cannon Wreck, a marine archaeological site in the Erme Estuary, Devon
- Salcombe Castle, a ruined fortification near Salcombe
- Salcombe Hardy, a fictional journalist in the Lord Peter Wimsey series of detective stories by Dorothy L. Sayers
- Salcombe Lifeboat Station, a Royal National Lifeboat Institution (RNLI) base at Salcombe
- Salcombe Preparatory School, Southgate, London
- Salcombe Regis, a coastal village in Devon, England
- Salcombe Yawl, a small sailing dinghy restricted class native to Salcombe
