= Bokros =

Bokros or Bokroš (Hungaro-Slovak rendition) is a Hungarian surname meaning "bushy". Notable people with the surname include:

- Ernest Bokroš (born 1959), Slovak ice hockey coach
- Lajos Bokros (born 1954), Hungarian economist
- Lukáš Bokroš (born 1982), Slovak former professional ice hockey left winger
- Szilárd Bokros (born 2000), Hungarian footballer
- Tibor Bokros (born 1989), Hungarian football player
- Tomáš Bokroš (born 1989), Slovak professional ice hockey defenceman
- Verona Ádám Bokros (born 1948), Serbian politician of Hungarian descent
- Zsuzsa Bokros-Török (born 1947), Hungarian volleyball player

== See also ==
- Bokros package
- Bokor (surname)
