= Török =

Török (Hungarian for "Turk") may refer to:

- Albert Török (1903–1971), Romanian-Hungarian footballer
- András Török (born 1978), Hungarian squash player
- Bálint Török de Enying (1502–1551), Hungarian aristocrat, Ban of Nándorfehérvár (Belgrade) and Lord of Csesznek
- Béla Török (born 1990), Hungarian water polo player
- Daniel Torok, American photographer
- Bódog Török (1923–2012), Hungarian handball player, coach and sports official
- Eduard Torok (born 1997), Romanian ski jumper who also competed for Hungary
- Ferenc Török (born 1935), Hungarian modern pentathlete and Olympic champion
- Ferenc Török (director) (born 1971), Hungarian film director
- Gábor Török (footballer) (1936–2004), Hungarian football goalkeeper
- Gábor Török (political scientist) (born 1971), Hungarian political scientist and historian
- Gavrila Törok (born 1919), Romanian water polo player
- Győző Török (1935–1987), Hungarian cyclist
- Gyula Török (1938–2014), former boxer from Hungary
- Ignác Török (1795–1849), Hungarian general
- Jaroslav Török (born 1971), Slovak ice hockey player
- László Török (1941–2020), Hungarian historian
- Mária Török (1925–1998), Hungarian born French psychoanalyst
- Mitchell Torok (1929–2017), American country musician of Hungarian origin
- Ottó Török (born 1937), Hungarian modern pentathlete
- Péter Török (1951–1987), Hungarian football Defender
- Péter Török (biologist) (born 1979), Hungarian biologist and researcher
- Rolland Török (born 1990), Romanian basketball player
- Sándor Török (footballer) (born 1981), Hungarian footballer
- Sándor Török (writer) (1904–1985), Hungarian journalist, translator and writer
- Tomáš Török (born 1995), Slovak ice hockey player
- Zoltán Török (1899–1970), Hungarian rower
- Zsuzsa Bokros-Török (born 1947), Hungarian volleyball player

== See also ==
- Torok Formation, geologic formation in the National Petroleum Reserve in Alaska that preserves fossils dating back to the Cretaceous period
- Maria Török-Duca (born 1959), Romanian professional handball manager and former player
- Beverly Torok-Storb (1948–2023), American physician, Professor of Clinical Research at the Fred Hutchinson Cancer Research Center
