= Overbeck's =

Edwardian garden in Devon, England

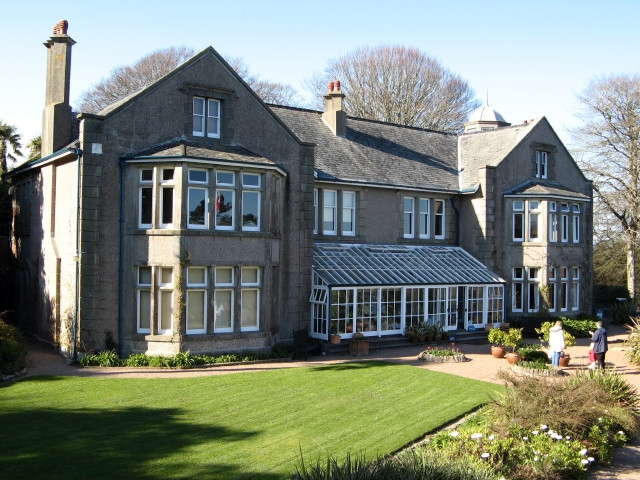

- Location within Devon

General information
- Architectural style: Edwardian
- Location: Sharpitor, Salcombe, United Kingdom
- Coordinates: 50.2232°N 3.7843°W
- Owner: National Trust

Overbeck's Garden at Sharpitor is an Edwardian 2.75 hectare (7 acre) subtropical Grade II registered garden at Sharpitor, Salcombe, Devon, England. It is named after its last private owner Otto Christop Joseph Gerhardt Ludwig Overbeck (1860–1937), a British chemist and electrotherapy advocate.

== History ==
The original house on the site was "Sharpitor", a small villa by Salcombe builder Albert Stumbles. In 1901, it was bought by Edric Hopkins, who also bought a further 2 acres (8,100 m^{2}) of land, and laid out the garden, creating terraces and planting exotic specimens on the sheltered site. In 1913, the property was bought by Mr and Mrs George Medlicott Vereker who demolished the original house and had the present one built.

Otto Overbeck acquired the house in 1928 and lived there until his death in 1937. Wishing the house to be used after his death as "a public park and museum and a Hostel for Youth" Overbeck bequeathed it to the National Trust or Salcombe Urban District Council on condition it be used as such and not as a brothel as so many properties in the surrounding area had become. It was accepted by the National Trust.

Until 2014, the house was divided between a museum and a youth hostel. The youth hostel closed in 2014 when the agreement between the National Trust and the Youth Hostels Association ended. The museum closed in 2020 when the house was shut for repair and maintenance work. Major structural repairs to the house have been undertaken, but further restoration work is needed. As a result, the house is due to remain closed during 2026 and 2027.

== Museum ==
The museum displayed some of Overbeck's inventions and collections of stuffed animals, and exhibitions of model sailing ships and various nautical and shipbuilding tools and effects. Many of the maritime-related items have subsequently been displayed at Salcombe Maritime Museum. A room in the middle of the house, one of whose entrances is a "secret" door concealed in the wooden panelling of the room outside, contained a display of dolls' houses, amongst which was "Fred the friendly ghost" for children to discover. The museum contained a Polyphon — a large musical box which played music encoded as holes punched in large sheet-metal discs. There was a collection of discs of popular Edwardian melodies which were played for visitors when the garden was open. There was also a collection of photographs by Edward Chapman who worked in and photographed Salcombe – including the building of the first house on the site – during the early 20th century.

== Garden ==
The garden, begun by Edric Hopkins, was developed by the property's subsequent owners. It has become a specialised collection of tender Mediterranean and Australasian plants growing in the microclimate on the edge of the Kingsbridge Estuary. The National Trust identify the following separate gardens:.

View of Salcombe harbour from the garden at Overbeck's.

- Gazebo Garden
- Statue Garden - formerly the tennis court
- Old Quarry - source of the stone for the house
- Olive Grove
- Banana Garden - the bananas produce fruit most years
- Terraces
- Orange Tree Store - a glasshouse for overwintering the orange tree
- Woodland Garden

More detailed information about the history of the garden and its gardeners is given in Historic England's official listing.
