= Bokor (surname) =

Bokor is a Hungarian surname. Notable people with the surname include:

- Elemér Bokor (1887–1928), Hungarian entomologist
- György Bokor (1928–2014), Hungarian basketball player
- Jeffrey Bokor, American electrical engineer
- Jozsef Bokor, Hungarian electrical engineer
- Judit Bokor (1899–1972), Hungarian cellist
- Margit Bokor (1900 or 1903–1949), Hungarian operatic soprano
- Marián Bokor (born 1977), Slovak javelin thrower
- Miklos Bokor (1927–2019), French-Hungarian painter and essayist
- Pál Bokor (born 1942), Hungarian journalist, writer and translator
