= Stumble =

Stumble, Stumbles, or The Stumble may refer to:

- Stumbles, a surname
- Stumble (film), a 2003 Indian film
- "The Stumble", a 1961 blues guitar instrumental
- The Stumble (film), a 1953 Iranian film
- Stumble (album), a 1998 album by the AALY Trio + Ken Vandermark
- "Stumble", a 2005 song by Calla from the album Collisions
- Stumble, an NBC TV series

== See also ==
- Serendipity, the effect by which one accidentally stumbles upon something fortunate
- Trip (disambiguation)
