= Musical comb =

Musical comb may refer to

- A comb-like lamellaphone
- Comb and paper
- A comb-like element of various disc-playing music boxes, such as Polyphon
