= Bokor (disambiguation) =

A bokor is a Vodou priest.

Bokor may also refer to

- Bokor (surname)
- Bokor, Hungary, a village
- Bokor Municipality
  - Bokor, Cambodia, the newest city in Kampot

== See also ==
- Bokor Hill Station, a collection of French colonial buildings atop Bokor Mountain in Cambodia
- Boqor, a Somali royal title
