= Moor Sand site =

Shipwreck near Salcombe, Devon, England

Coordinates: 50°12′44″N 3°44′24″W

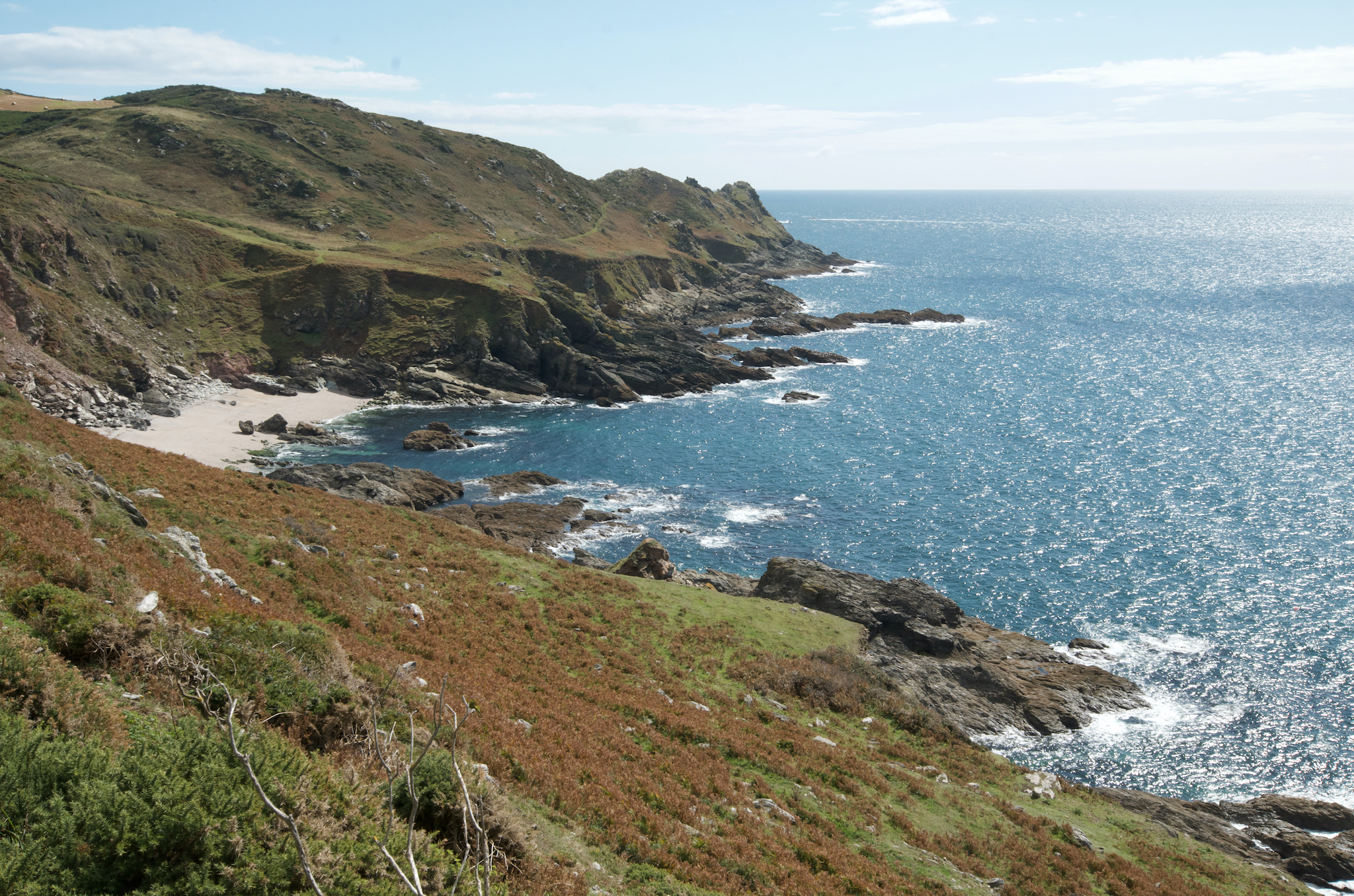
Salcombe Moor Sand Site

The remains of a wreck carrying cargo of Middle Bronze Age weapons was found in 1977 off Moor Sand, Gammon Head, South Hams, Devon, England. The site was designated under the Protection of Wrecks Act on 14 February 1978. The wreck is a Protected Wreck managed by Historic England

== Wreck ==
The site may represent the wreck of a prehistoric boat that sunk while carrying Middle Bronze Age weaponry including swords, palstaves, and other materials.

== Discovery and investigation ==
The site was identified in 1977 by trainee divers on a training course in Salcombe. Systematic searches in the following years identified further materials. The last artefact was recovered in 1982.

== See also ==
- Archaeology of shipwrecks
- Underwater archaeology
- List of designations under the Protection of Wrecks Act
- Salcombe Cannon Wreck
