= Otto Overbeck =

British chemist and electrotherapy advocate

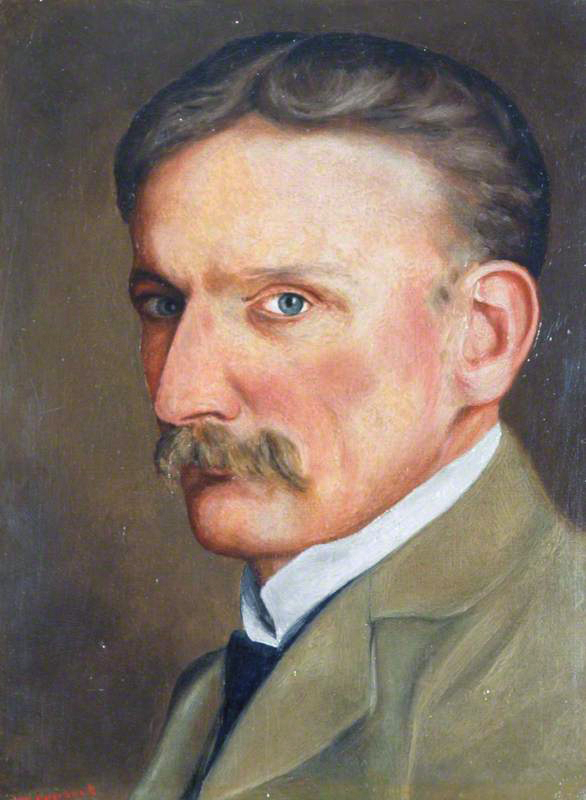
- Born: Otto Christop Joseph Gerhardt Ludwig Overbeck; 1860
- Died: 1937
- Occupations: Brewer, Inventor, Scientist
- Known for: Inventions, the Overbeck Rejuvenator, Overbeck's

Otto Overbeck (1860–1937) was a British chemist and prominent advocate of electrotherapy in the early twentieth century.

== Life ==
Overbeck's father was a Dutch-Italian linguist, who had worked as an assistant to Max Müller at the University of Oxford. He educated his son Otto at home until Otto proceeded to University College School. Overbeck then took a BSc at University College London, where he studied chemistry, graduating in 1881. By his own account, he was third in the BSc degree examination out of 1,100 candidates, and after graduating studied at Bonn University for a further year.

Following his studies, Overbeck worked as the scientific director of a brewery in Grimsby from 1891 to 1928. He retired in June 1928 to Salcombe in Devon.

Following retirement, Overbeck lived in a palatial house in Sharpitor, Salcombe, Devon, now known as Overbeck's. He left it to the National Trust. Here he collected all manner of natural historical artefacts, and gathered specimens of tropical plants from across the world, opening the gardens to the public.

He was a Fellow of the Royal Geographical Society, and a member of the Geological Society of London and the Chemical Society. Overbeck was a keen patron of boys' clubs, including the junior division of Retford Physical Culture Club, Retford Swimming Club, the Scouts in Grimsby, the Grimsby Dolphin Swimming Club, Dawlish Boys' Brigade, Shenstone Scout Group. and South Hams Football Club.

=== Prosecution and acquittal for indecent assault ===
On 10 January 1929, Overbeck was charged by Chapel-en-le-Frith magistrates with eighteen counts of indecent assault (under Section 62 of the Offences Against the Person Act 1861), buggery (under Section 61 of the Offences Against the Person Act 1861) and gross indecency (under Section 11 of the Criminal Law Amendment Act 1885) allegedly committed against four boys, all from Grimsby, with whom Overbeck was acquainted through the Grimsby Dolphin Swimming Club, between 26 May and 5 August 1928. He was remanded on bail of £2,000. (Under UK law as of 2018, most of these charges would now fall under sexual activity with a child in the Sexual Offences Act 2003.) On 27 February 1929, Overbeck was indicted at the Derbyshire Assizes, pleading not guilty.

The prosecution was led by Norman Winning and G. Smallwood. According to newspaper reporting, in 1928, Overbeck 'was driven in a motor car by a chauffeur with the boys in question to Castleton on the dates of the alleged offences. The boys were in a completely different station of life from Overbeck, and were, in every case, working boys, their ages being 16, 20, and two aged 15. It has been the habit of Overbeck to stay at an apartment house in Castleton, and to occupy a room with two of the youths on each occasion. On most occasions, continued Mr. Winning, Overbeck gave the boys money afterwards, and one boy alleged that the money was given to him "to keep his mouth shut".' The prosecution emphasised that it was unlikely that its witnesses would choose to implicate themselves in the alleged sexual acts unless they had actually happened.

Overbeck was defended by Norman Birkett, 1st Baron Birkett. The case for the defence focused on the good character and high social standing of Overbeck; the unreliability of lower-class child witnesses; the lack of corroborating evidence; and two expert witnesses (Dr Buchanan of Harley Street and Dr Theodore Hyslop, previously of Bethlehem Royal Hospital), who argued that Overbeck was physically incapable of the alleged crimes.

On 1 March, the jury acquitted Overbeck on all counts.

== "Electric health" ==
Overbeck patented aspects of the Rejuvenator in many countries during the late 1920s, and marketed it. He also proposed a "theory of electric health", which he advocated in A New Electronic Theory of Life (1925). In this book, Overbeck linked all manner of ailments with an imbalance of electricity. Restoring the natural balance of the electric body, Overbeck argued, could overcome all illness apart from those caused by germs or deformity.

The Rejuvenator was not an electric "shock" device in the traditional sense; rather, it made use of very small, harmless, levels of electric current, which were applied to affected areas on the body by means of intricately shaped electrodes. In a later book, The New Light, published in 1936, Overbeck argued that the universal force of electricity made religion obsolete. The universe instead operated under a "Deistic electronic law", which governed everything from atomic forces to the motions of the heavenly bodies. An example of the Rejuvenator, is held by the Thackray Museum.

Overbeck amassed wealth from sales of the Rejuvenator. After his death, two friends established the Overbeck Rejuvenator Company, which continued to supply replacement parts for Rejuvenators until the mid-1950s.
