= Giorgio Valensin =

Italian composer (1850–1889)

Cavaliere Giorgio Valensin
- Born: 1850; Livorno, Grand Duchy of Tuscany
- Died: December 1889 (aged 39) Florence, Kingdom of Italy
- Years active: 1874–1889

Giorgio Valensin (Francized Georges Valensin; /vælənˈsiːn/; val-ən-SEEN; 1850 – December 1889) was an Italian composer of the Romantic era. A banker by profession, he was elected to serve on the municipal council of Florence. He wrote the opera La Capricciosa in 1874, followed by two symphonic works later in the decade.

He is best known for the minuet from the third movement of his Symphony No. 1, composed in 1879 and dedicated to Jules Danbé. Transcriptions of the minuet became a popular salon and concert piece for piano, and an arrangement by Paul Bazelaire brought the minuet into the cello repertoire.

== Biography ==
Valensin was born in Livorno, then part of the Grand Duchy of Tuscany, in 1850. He was born into an aristocratic family of Italian Jews (according to his appearance in the necrology of Il Corriere Israelitico) and studied in France. In 1870, he returned to Italy and settled in the Tuscan countryside. Valensin was elected to the municipal council of Florence at a young age and was re-elected in every subsequent election. A friend of the mayor, Francesco Guicciardini, he sat on the council's finance commission, which Guicciardini chaired. He was appointed a knight of the Grand Duchy of Tuscany in 1883 and given the title of cavaliere.

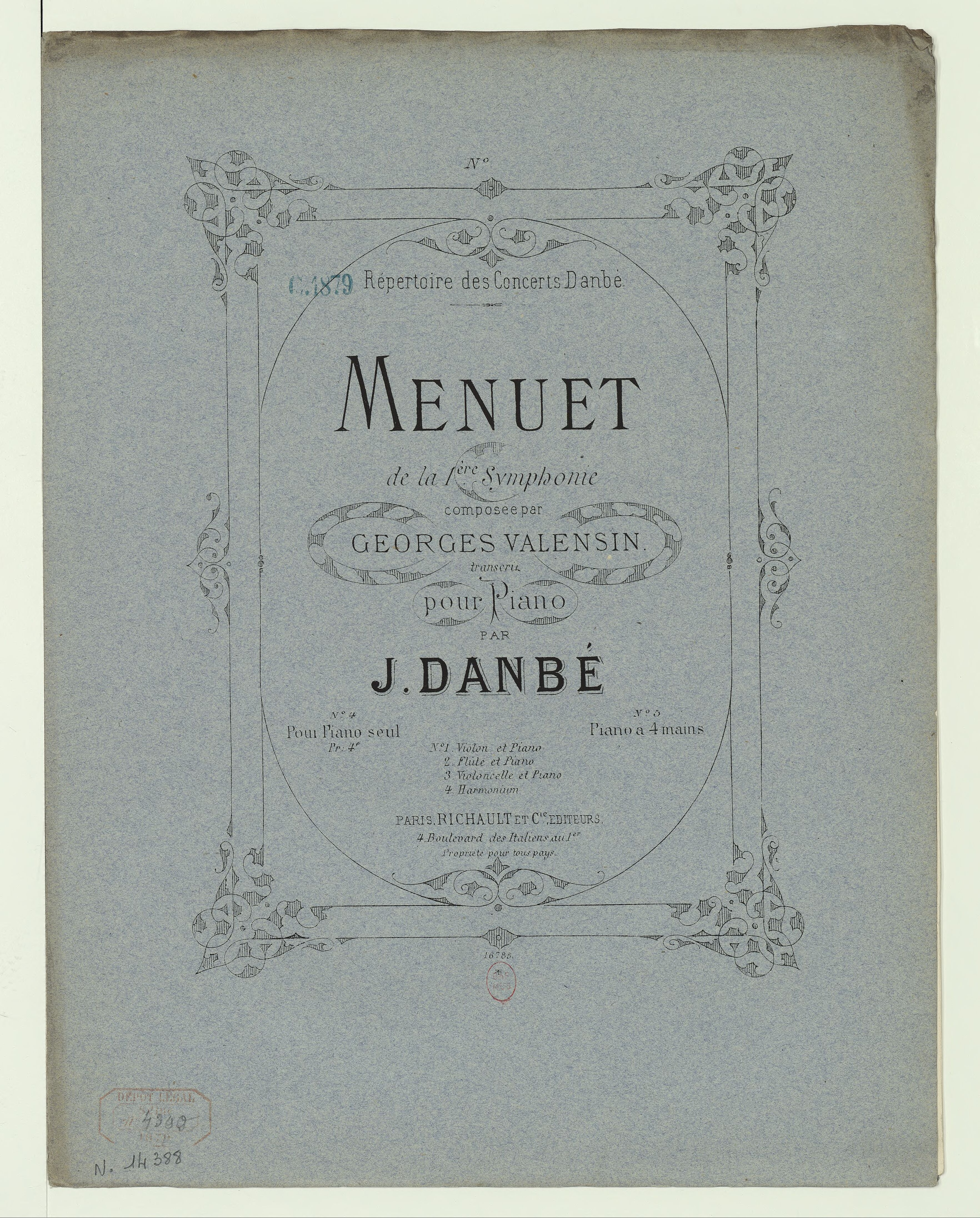
Cover page of the Minuet, transcribed for piano by Jules Danbé (1879)

He worked as a banker, and in 1874, The Musical World remarked on the novelty of a banker turning to operatic composition. His opera semiseria La Capricciosa was performed during the carnival at the Teatro delle Logge in Florence on 28 February 1874. The lyrics of the opera were based on a book of the same name by the Livornese author Angelo Consigli (1835–1908).

By the late 1870s, Valensin was active in Paris, where the minuet from his First Symphony was published in score and parts by Éditions Richault around 1879. Excerpts from two symphonies were reportedly performed in France during the 1870s and 1880s, but only the minuet appeared in print. He dedicated Symphony No. 1 to the conductor and violinist Jules Danbé, who included the minuet from the symphony into his own concert repertoire at Le Grand Hôtel in Paris in 1879. Danbé transcribed the minuet for solo piano, and a four-hand arrangement by Renaud de Vilbac followed in 1880. Both were published as part of the "Répertoire des concerts Danbé", and another piano transcription by Georges Pfeiffer appeared in 1885. After Paul Bazelaire arranged the symphony's minuet for cello, it entered the cello repertoire. Bazelaire also transcribed the music for three cellos. In 1913, Ross Jungnickel arranged the Célèbre Menuet for piano trio.

Minuet from Symphony No. 1 (1929)

The minuet for solo cello was recorded by Hungarian cellist Judith Bokor in 1924. The Boston Symphony Orchestra played the Symphony No. 1: Minuet for strings on 16 and 19 June 1928 under the baton of Alfredo Casella. A rendition by Emanuel Feuermann accompanied by Michał Taube was recorded in April 1927, and another rendition was released by Pathé Records in 1929 on a vinyl record that included music by Jean-Philippe Rameau and Simon-Luc Marchand (1709–1799). János Starker, accompanied on piano by Gerald Moore, recorded a version of the minuet arranged by Gregor Piatigorsky at Abbey Road Studios on 7 June 1958.

Valensin died in December 1889, aged 39. He was buried on 2 January 1890. His funeral was widely attended by members of Florentine high society and included Alessandro d'Ancona.
