= Judith Bokor =

Hungarian cellist (1903–1971)

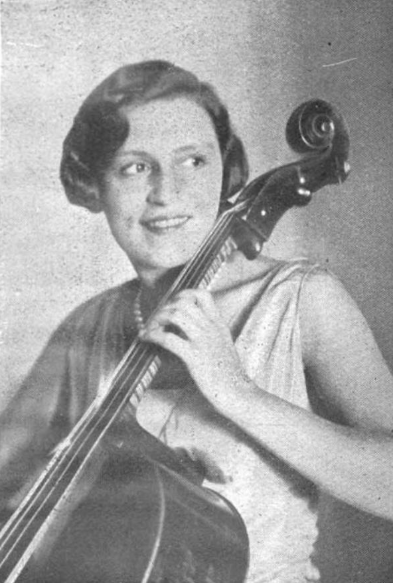
- Portrait in 1929

Background information
- Born: Judit Bokor; April 10, 1899; Budapest, Austria-Hungary
- Died: July 21, 1972 (aged 73) The Netherlands
- Education: Franz Liszt Academy of Music; Hochschule für Musik Hanns Eisler Berlin
- Years active: 1919–1931
- Spouse: Géza Kálmán Kosch

Judit Bokor (Anglicized Judith; /ˈboʊkɔːr/ BOH-kor; April 10, 1899 – July 21, 1972) was a Hungarian cellist. A student of David Popper and Hugo Becker, she was based in the Netherlands for most of her career and performed widely across Western Europe in the 1920s with the support of her husband, the impresario Géza de Koos. She performed on the Graudan cello, made by Guadagnini in 1743. Bokor was best known for her heavy use of the portamento technique.

Her short career was ended in 1931 by an illness that prevented her from playing music for the rest of her life. Her recordings for Columbia Records in 1924 and 1925 are among the earliest surviving cello recordings by a Hungarian musician.

== Early life and education ==
Bokor was born in 1899 in Budapest, co-capital of the Austro-Hungarian Empire, to a family of Hungarian Jews. At the age of nine, she began studying cello at the Royal National Hungarian Academy of Music (now the Franz Liszt Academy of Music) in Budapest under David Popper, the Bohemian-born virtuoso and composer who had been appointed to the faculty there in 1886 at the recommendation of Franz Liszt. She later went to Berlin to continue her studies under German cellist Hugo Becker at the Hochschule für Musik.

== Career ==
In 1919, following the short-lived communist government of Béla Kun in Hungary, Bokor and her husband, Hungarian lawyer Géza Kálmán Kosch (1887–1971), fled to the Netherlands. On the advice of conductor Willem Mengelberg, Kosch established himself as a concert impresario, adopting the professional name Géza de Koos. His agency, the Hollandsche Concertdirectie, became one of the most influential in the Netherlands: he managed the celebrated Kurhaus Concerts and represented major international artists including Jorge Bolet and Sergei Rachmaninoff.

Bokor gave her solo debut in the Netherlands on September 23, 1919. She was accompanied by Dutch pianists including Willem Pijper at the inaugural Mahler Festival, and by Louis Schnitzler (1868–1933) until 1925, after which she had Theo van der Pas as accompanist. On March 3, 1920, she played Pjiper's Sonata in C Major, with the composer accompanying her on piano. She received critical acclaim for her early performances:

Her playing this time showed a remarkable advance in technique, ripeness of feeling, and general musicianship. Considering her attainments at her present age—which one is permitted to hint at if a lady has hardly passed twenty—it may safely be predicted that she will have a splendid career.

— The Musical Times (1921)

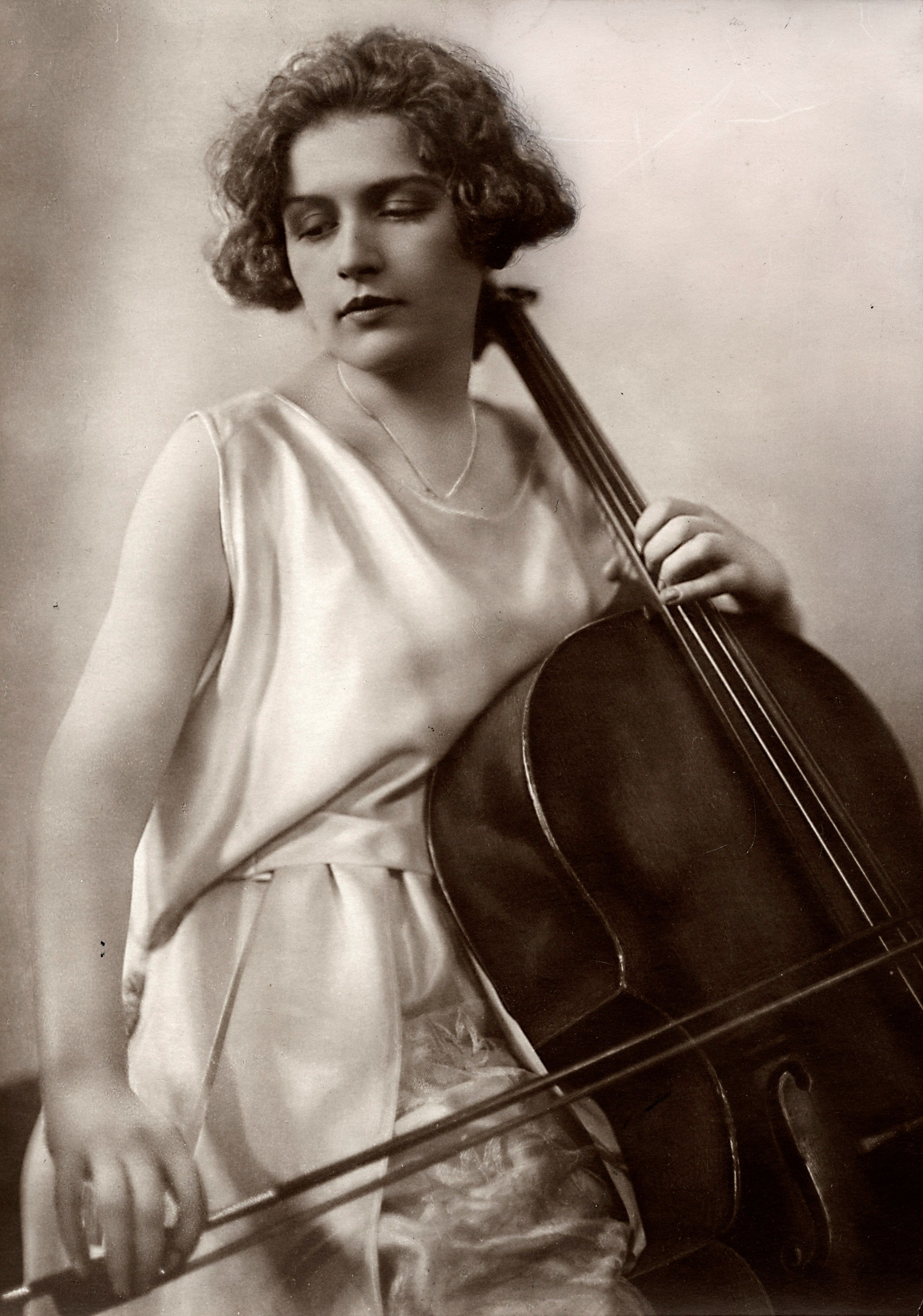
Bokor in 1925

With the support of her husband's professional connections, she began performing concerts across the Netherlands, and then across Western Europe. She performed the Saint-Saëns Concerto in A Minor in Amsterdam in the autumn of 1920, to critical acclaim. She also played at the Aeolian Hall in London, Ontario on May 1924, performing a Haydn concerto and Léon Boëllmann's Variations Symphoniques, and was praised by The Strad for her "fine technique" and playing "full of vigour and character." She toured North America again in 1930 for three months. Her technique featured heavy use of portamento, which was common among cellists of the period.

In 1927, she acquired the Graudan cello made by Giovanni Battista Guadagnini in 1743 from Marguerite Agaranthe Miles Tennant (1868–1943), who also owned the Lady Tennant Stradivarius. Her last performance was in 1931, when an illness prevented her from playing the cello, thus all recordings of her date to before this period. She sold the Graudan cello through W. E. Hill & Sons in 1935, and it was acquired by Nathan E. Posner (1880–1962), a rare violin collector.

She died in the Netherlands on July 21, 1972, aged 75.

== Recordings ==
Le cygne by Saint-Saëns (1925)

Chants russes by Édouard Lalo (1925)

Kol Nidrei by Max Bruch (1924)

She made a number of recordings, including 78 RPM records for the Columbia label in 1924 and 1925, and electric 78 RPM records in 1927. The following lists her surviving discography:

- Le cygne, Camille Saint-Saëns (Columbia D 9768 on F 87; Polyphon 31314 1099; c. 1925)
- Kol Nidrei, Max Bruch (Columbia D 17144 on FX 167; January 7, 1924)
- Romance in E-Flat Major, Op. 44 No. 1, Anton Rubinstein (Columbia D 9758 on F 86; c. 1925)
- Scherzo, Carl Ditters von Dittersdorf (Columbia D 17143 on FX 10; January 3, 1924)
- Menuet, Giorgio Valensin (Columbia D 17143 on FX 11; January 3, 1924)
- Chants Russes, Édouard Lalo (Columbia D 12801 on FX 56; June 5, 1925)
- Caro mio ben, Tommaso Giordani (Columbia D 12805 on FX 41; June 4, 1925)
- Gavotte, transcr. Willy Burmester (Columbia D 12805 on FX 50; June 4, 1925)
- Cantique de noel, Adolphe Adam (Columbia D9759 on F88; c. 1927)
- Serenade espagnole, Alexander Glazunov (Polyphon 31314 1098; c. 1925)
- Valse triste, Jean Sibelius (Columbia D 12801 on FX 51; June 5, 1925)
- Stille Nacht, Heilige Nacht (Columbia D9759 on F89); c. 1927)
