= Polydor Records =

British record label

Polydor Limited
- Parent company: Universal Music Group (UMG)
- Founded: 2 April 1913; 113 years ago
- Distributors: Self-Distributed (UK and France); A&M Records/Capitol Records/0207 Def Jam (US); Republic Records (Pre-1998 reissues in the US, including James Brown, MGM and Verve pop catalog); Universal Music Group (International); Universal Music Japan (Japan)
- Genre: Various
- Country of origin: Germany; United Kingdom
- Location: London, England
- Official website: polydor.co.uk

Polydor, also known as Polydor Records, is a British record label that operates as part of Universal Music Group UK's Polydor Label Group unit. Prior to 2024, it had a close relationship with Universal's Interscope Geffen A&M Records label, which distributed Polydor's releases in the United States under the A&M Records imprint. In turn, Polydor distributes Interscope releases in the United Kingdom. Polydor Records Ltd. was established in London in 1954 as a British subsidiary of German company Deutsche Grammophon/Schallplatte Grammophon GmbH. It was renamed Polydor Ltd. in 1972. The company is usually mentioned as "Polydor Ltd. (UK)", or a similar form, for holding copyrights.

Notable current and past artists signed to the label include Rainbow, Siouxsie and the Banshees, BTS, the Cure, James Brown, John Mayall, Deep Purple, Cream, the Moody Blues, the Who, Golden Earring, Jimi Hendrix, Focus, Fishmans, Bee Gees, Lynsey de Paul, Lana Del Rey, Stephen Fretwell, Alexandros, the Jam, Style Council, the Shadows, James Last, Eric Clapton, Gloria Gaynor, Level 42, Sam Fender, S Club, Girls Aloud, Cheryl, Raye, Ellie Goulding, Florence and the Machine and Jesy Nelson.

== Label history ==
=== Beginnings ===
Polydor Records was founded on 2 April 1913 by German Polyphon-Musikwerke AG in Leipzig and registered on 25 July 1914 (Nr. 316613). The label was founded as Firma Brachhausen & Riesener in 1887 by Gustav Adolf Brachhausen and Ernst Paul Riessner, for manufacturing their new mechanical disc-playing music box Polyphon, invented in 1870. During World War I on 24 April 1917, Polyphon-Musikwerke AG acquired the German Deutsche Grammophon-Aktiengesellschaft record plant and company from the German government. The German state had taken over British-held Grammophon as enemy property during World War I.

Polydor was originally an independent branch of the Polyphon-Grammophon-Konzern group. It was used as an export label from 1924. After the British and German branches of the Gramophone Company were separated during World War I, Deutsche Grammophon claimed the rights to the Nipper-dog and gramophone trademark for Germany, where His Master's Voice recordings were to be released under the Electrola trademark replacing the company lost during the war.

1920s vintage Polydor export label with its double-horn gramophone logo

In turn, Deutsche Grammophon records exported from Germany were released on the Polyphon Musik and Polydor labels. New foreign branches were founded, for example in Austria, Denmark, Sweden and France.

In 1941, Deutsche Grammophon (including Polydor) was purchased by Siemens & Halske. Polydor became a popular music label in 1946, while the new Deutsche Grammophon Gesellschaft label became a classical music label in 1949. The previously used label, Grammophon, was disbanded. DGG gave, by an agreement dated 5 July 1949, an exclusive license from 1 July 1951 to use the Nipper-dog with gramophone to the original owner's company Electrola, the German branch of EMI. (In Germany, it was impossible to sell the trademark without selling the company.) Polydor remained Deutsche Grammophon's export label, including classical music, in France and the Spanish-speaking world for the remainder of the long-playing era, as a result of language and cultural concerns. DGG established a subsidiary in London called Polydor Records Ltd. in 1954.

In the early 1960s, orchestra leader Bert Kaempfert signed unknowns Tony Sheridan and The Beatles, credited as The Beat Brothers, to Polydor. Popular International entertainers such as James Last, Bert Kaempfert, Kurt Edelhagen, Caterina Valente and the Kessler Twins appeared on the Polydor label, as well as many French, Spanish and Latin-American figures.

Siemens entered into a joint venture with Philips in 1962 creating the Grammophon-Philips Group, of which Polydor became a subsidiary label. Throughout the late 1960s, Polydor released albums of John Mayall & the Bluesbreakers, Cream, The Who, Jimi Hendrix, Bee Gees and Eric Clapton.

Polydor opened a US branch in 1969 (in years prior, they licensed their catalogue to Atlantic Records), but did not become a real presence in the US record industry until its purchase of the recording contract and back catalogue of R&B performer James Brown in 1971, and the absorption of the MGM Records label by its parent company PolyGram in 1972.

In 1970, Polydor acquired the Hong Kong–based Diamond Records, which had been owned and founded by the local Portuguese merchant Ren da Silva in the late 1950s.

=== PolyGram ===
In 1954 Polydor Records introduced their distinctive orange label

In 1972, the Grammophon-Philips Group (GPG) reorganised to create PolyGram, from Polydor and PhonoGram. The Polydor label continued to run as a subsidiary label under the new company. Throughout the 1970s, Polydor Incorporated became a major rock label, also releasing records by hit makers such as the Bee Gees, Gloria Gaynor, Atlanta Rhythm Section and Ray, Goodman & Brown.

Into the 1980s, Polydor continued to do respectable business, in spite of becoming increasingly overshadowed by its PolyGram sister label Mercury Records. Polydor took over management of British Decca's pop catalogue. A&R manager Frank Neilson was able to score a major top ten hit in March 1981 for the label with "Do the Hucklebuck" by Coast to Coast as well as signing Ian Dury and Billy Fury to the company. In 1984, the company name was parodied in the rockumentary film This Is Spinal Tap (whose soundtrack album was distributed by Polydor), where "Polymer Records" was the band's record company.

By the early 1990s, Polydor had begun to underperform. PolyGram subsequently trimmed most of Polydor's staff and roster, and shifted it to operate under the umbrella of PolyGram Label Group (PLG), a newly constructed "super label" specifically designed to oversee the operations of PolyGram's lesser performing imprints, which included Island Records, London Records, Atlas Records and Verve Records at the time.

In 1994, as Island Records recovered from its sales slump, PolyGram dissolved most of PLG into it. Meanwhile, Polydor Records and Atlas Records merged, briefly called "Polydor/Atlas", and began operating through A&M Records, another PolyGram subsidiary. In 1995, Polydor/Atlas became simply Polydor Records again.

=== Twilight years in the United States ===
In 1998, PolyGram was acquired by Seagram and combined with its Universal Music Group. During the merger of these two music powerhouses, Polydor's operations in the United States were assimilated into the Interscope-Geffen-A&M label group. Meanwhile, its international division remained operational, with its records still being distributed domestically via Interscope and A&M.

Today, in North America, the Polydor Records name and logo is mostly used on reissues of older material from its 1960s and 1970s heyday. Republic Records handles the US distribution of most pre-1998 Polydor releases, including the reissues from the British Decca pop/rock collections, James Brown and the MGM Records and Verve Records pop catalog. Nevertheless, during the 2010s, Interscope Records occasionally released music by artists such as Azealia Banks and Lana Del Rey under the Polydor name and branding.

Polydor joined UMG's Interscope Capitol Labels Group in 2024, but it was short-lived. Later that June (announced in July), Universal Music UK formed the Polydor Label Group, reassigning Polydor Records as the flagship imprint of the newly-created unit. Polydor now distributes releases by the revived A&M Records, Capitol Records and Def Jam Recordings (0207 Def Jam) in the United Kingdom.

== Polydor Nashville ==
Record producer Harold Shedd founded Polydor's Nashville, Tennessee, division in 1994, which specialised in country music. Among the acts signed to Polydor Nashville were Shane Sutton, Tasha Harris, 4 Runner, the Moffatts, Chely Wright, Mark Luna, Clinton Gregory, Amie Comeaux, along with Toby Keith and Davis Daniel, who transferred from Mercury Nashville in 1994. The Nashville division was renamed A&M Nashville in March 1996 and closed in September of the same year, as PolyGram consolidated all its Nashville operations under the Mercury name. Today, Polydor, along with EMI Records in the UK and Australia and UMG itself in Canada distribute Lost Highway Records' albums in the Commonwealth realms.

== Polydor UK ==
In 1972, the British Polydor Records Ltd. was renamed to Polydor Ltd. In the early 1970s, the main source of income for the label was the successful UK band Slade, as well as the New Seekers and The Who. At the time, between the 1970s and 1980s, the Polydor/PolyGram Senior VP (who was originally the first head of their new at the time rock department) was Jerry Jaffe, who also signed acts such as Motörhead, Dexys Midnight Runners, and the Jam. In the late 1970s and early 1980s, the label was home to the Who and the Jam (as well as its successor act the Style Council). Jaffe also interacted with many famous and successful artists while in his position, including Nick Lowe and John Lennon, as well as going on to work with groups such as the Jesus and Mary Chain and Saint Etienne in the late 1980s and 1990s.

Although Polydor's American branch is nearly inactive, in the United Kingdom Polydor remains one of the most prominent labels in the country—with artists such as Take That, Cheryl, Duffy, Girls Aloud, S Club, the Saturdays, Kaiser Chiefs, Ellie Goulding, Mabel and Lawson. Polydor also has a strong indie roster through the Fiction imprint with acts such as Ian Brown, Bright Eyes, Elbow, Stephen Fretwell, White Lies, Kate Nash, Snow Patrol, Filthy Dukes, and Crystal Castles. Polydor has also survived in Canada, becoming the home label for Drake. It also acts as the UK label for American-based acts under Interscope-Geffen-A&M such as Eminem, the All-American Rejects, the Black Eyed Peas, Billie Eilish, Camila Cabello, Gwen Stefani, Dr. Dre, Lana Del Rey, Lady Gaga, Olivia Rodrigo, Selena Gomez and Sting.

In 2006, Polydor launched Fascination Records, a music label dedicated to pop music. Both Girls Aloud and Sophie Ellis-Bextor transferred to the new label and created groups such as the Saturdays and Girls Can't Catch. Several pop acts from US label Hollywood Records, such as Demi Lovato, Jonas Brothers, Miley Cyrus, and Selena Gomez & the Scene were also signed to Fascination.

In 2008, A&M Records UK was founded as an imprint of Polydor UK. The same year, Polydor obtained distribution of the Rolling Stones' back catalogue as well as new releases. With the establishment of A&M Records UK, A&M Records' Canadian division became a separate entity for the first time since the formation of Universal Music Group. Polydor, meanwhile, continued to distribute Interscope, Geffen and selected Lost Highway releases in Canada through Universal Music Canada, as it does to this day.

Polydor UK rejected British singer-songwriter Raye's album My 21st Century Blues and one of its lead singles, "Escapism" for release under the label, leading her to release the former independently. At the 2024 Brit Awards, Raye received six awards, all for works released with labels other than Polydor, breaking the record for the most nominations received by a single artist in a year.

== Polydor Japan ==
Polydor Records initially launched in Japan in 1926 as Nippon Polydor. During World War II, the company rebranded as Daitōa Chikuonki (大東亞蓄音器株式會社). In 1950, the company name was changed to Polydor Chikuonki K.K. (ポリドール蓄音器株式会社, Poridōru Chikuonki Kabushiki gaisha). In 1952, Polydor Chikuonki rebranded as Japan Polydor K.K.; later becoming Nippon Grammophon K.K..

In 1972, the company became a subsidiary of PolyGram as Polydor K.K. (ポリドール株式会社, Poridōru Kabushiki gaisha).

In 1990, PolyGram Co., Ltd. was founded as a supervising corporation of the Polygram group in Japan. Polydor K.K. continued to operate as a production company when its parent company rebranded as Universal Music Japan in 1999 until 2001 when it was merged with Universal Victor and rebranded as Universal Polydor. In 2002, Universal Polydor was rebranded as Universal J.

In December 2022, Universal Japan reorganized Universal J. The label was split into two record labels, UJ and Polydor Records. Polydor Records began operations as a division of Universal Japan on 01 January 2023.

Polydor's Japanese division currently has three imprints which are Perfume Records, Asse!! Records, and Utahime Records. It also has distribution rights for NHK Records and jointly releases material by Alexandros with RX-Records.

== See also ==
- Polydor Records artists
