= The Stumble (film) =

1953 film by Mehdi Reisfirooz

- Directed by: Mehdi Reisfirooz
- Written by: Mehdi Reisfirooz
- Production company: Alborz
- Release date: 16 September 1953
- Running time: 100 minutes
- Country: Iran
- Language: Persian

The Stumble (Persian: Laghzesh) is a 1953 Iranian film directed by Mehdi Reisfirooz.

== Bibliography ==
- Mohammad Ali Issari. Cinema in Iran, 1900-1979. Scarecrow Press, 1989.
