= Salcombe =

Town in Devon, England

Coordinates: 50°14′14″N 3°46′18″W

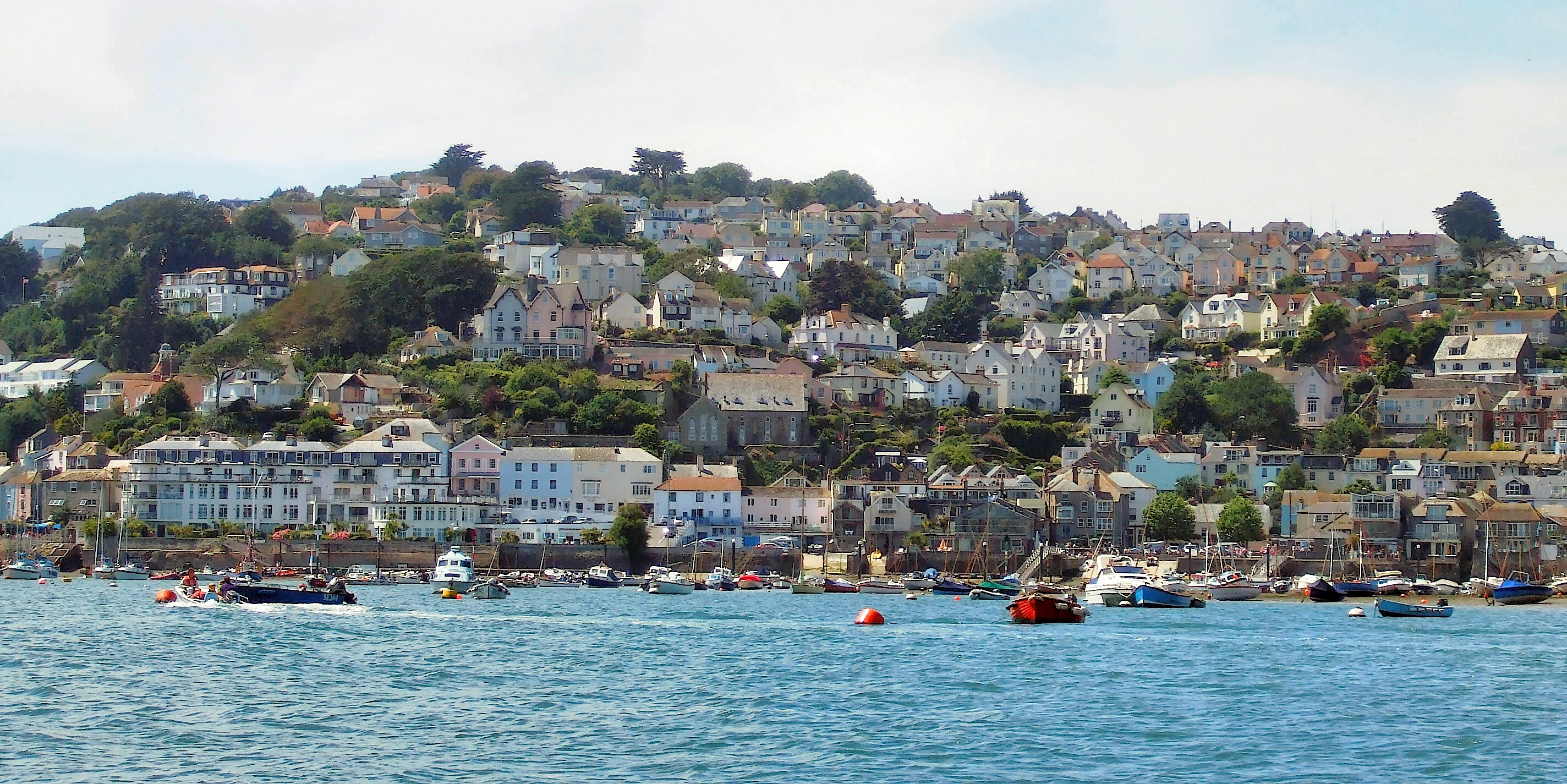
- Salcombe waterfront

- Location within Devon
- Population: 1,909 (2011 census)
- OS grid reference: SX7339
- District: South Hams
- Shire county: Devon
- Region: South West
- Country: England
- Sovereign state: United Kingdom
- Post town: SALCOMBE
- Postcode district: TQ8
- Dialling code: 01548
- Police: Devon and Cornwall
- Fire: Devon and Somerset
- Ambulance: South Western
- UK Parliament: South Devon

Salcombe is a resort town in the South Hams district of Devon, in south west England. The town is close to the mouth of the Kingsbridge Estuary, mostly built on the steep west side of the estuary. It lies within the South Devon Area of Outstanding Natural Beauty (AONB). The town's extensive waterfront and the naturally sheltered harbour formed by the estuary gave rise to its success as a boat and shipbuilding and sailing port and, in modern times, tourism especially in the form of pleasure boats and yachting. The town is also home to a traditional shellfish fishing industry. The town is part of the electoral ward of Salcombe and Malborough, for which the 2011 census recorded a total population of 3,353.

Kingsbridge Estuary (actually a ria or drowned valley) lies between Bolt Head and Sharpitor on the west and Portlemouth Down on the east, and runs inland for some 8.6 kilometres (5.3 mi). The estuary was designated a Site of Special Scientific Interest in February 1987 and is also a Local Nature Reserve.

== History ==
There are several shipwrecks off Salcombe. The oldest is of a Bronze Age ship, one of only three known in Britain, which had weapons and jewelry made in what is now France. The Salcombe Cannon Wreck is a 17th-century ship that contained 400 Moroccan gold coins and Dutch items. In 1936, a Finnish four-masted barque, Herzogin Cecilie, ran aground on the Ham Stone and was subsequently beached at Starehole Bay, near Bolt Head. Also off Salcombe is HMS Untiring, a World War II submarine, sunk in 1957 as a sonar target.

The name Salcombe derives from the Old English saltcumb meaning 'salt combe (valley)'.

A description of the South Hams is given in the 9th-century charter S298. It does not refer to Salcombe but its area is part of Badestone (Batson). "Salcombe" first appears in the records in 1244, on the boundaries of Batson and West Portlemouth (Portlemore Barton). In 1570, there were 56 mariners, while two years later, another survey shows five ships under 60 tons at Salcombe.

In 1566, there were ten seine nets at Salcombe, while in the 1580s, Salcombe fishermen travelled to Padstow annually for the new herring fishery. While there, they rented cottages and storehouses.

The ruins of Fort Charles remain towards the south of the town. It was built for Henry VIII to defend the estuary. During the English Civil War, the town sided with the Royalists. From January to May 1646, the fort held out against the Roundheads and was the last Royalist stronghold. It was slighted on the orders of Parliament.

There is little record of the town between 1650 and 1750, but it is thought that the inhabitants lived by fishing and smuggling. In 1764, the first holiday home, The Moult, was built in Salcombe.

In the 19th century, Salcombe was a major centre for shipping in the fruit trade. Salcombe vessels sailed to Iberia, the Mediterranean and the Caribbean as well as to the Azores and Newfoundland. The fruit cargoes were oranges and lemons from the Azores, and pineapples from the Bahamas and West Indies. Other cargoes brought back included sugar, rum, coconuts and shaddocks (pomelos). In addition, wood such as ebony and mahogany was brought for furnishing ships. Salcombe and Kingsbridge were busy ship-building locations, producing the Salcombe schooner, which was a fast boat that could be sailed with few hands. However, almost half the fleet was lost with all hands. A mutual marine assurance association had been established in 1811 to insure Salcombe ships.

The Salcombe fleet also was involved in the coastal trade, supplying coal from Wales and taking away cider, malt, grain and slates. A ferry to Brest was set up in 1870 but did not last.

By 1871, the central part of Salcombe, excluding the outlying districts, numbered 776 people, with 34 shipwrights and 13 ship's carpenters. There were also five sawyers, three block makers, two ship's riggers, three sail makers, a tin plate worker and four blacksmiths. However, in the 1870s, the fruit trade declined due to outbreaks of orange and pineapple disease, as well as the advent of steamships. Some work was found taking salt to Newfoundland and returning with cod but, by 1914, there were only three or four locally owned trading ships in the estuary. At that time, pleasure sailing began at Salcombe, with the yacht club being founded in 1894. One of the boats raced was the Salcombe Yawl for which an owner's association has been set up.

Salcombe became a ship registry port in 1864, but still came under Dartmouth for customs purposes. A customs house was later built at Salcombe which still exists. Between 1796 and 1887, at least 200 vessels were launched from Salcombe. To provide more space, the shipyards were extended by reclaiming the foreshore, but they were later built over and new ones constructed in Shadycombe Creek. However, many vessels were lost, including seven local boats off the Azores in November 1851. There were four sailmakers lofts at Salcombe and three shipsmiths in 1851. The majority of the Victorian houses seen in Salcombe today were built by shipowners and masters. After 1880, with the advent of steam propulsion and larger ships, there was less new construction and repair work. Salcombe's seamen and craftsmen moved to the deep-sea fishing ports or to the dockyards.

A turnpike road was built to Salcombe in 1824. Originally, Salcombe was part of Malborough parish but a chapel-of-ease was built at Salcombe in 1401. The parish church was not built until the 19th century. The population of Salcombe was 972 in 1841, but had risen to about 1500 by 1850. There is also a Wesleyan Chapel and a Catholic church.

Between the two world wars, Salcombe developed as a holiday resort, with Salcombe Sailing Club being founded in 1922.

During the Second World War, a radar station was set up on Bolt Head, and Salcombe became an Advance Amphibious Base for the United States Navy in September 1943. The Salcombe Hotel became the latter's headquarters and 60 other properties were requisitioned, and Quonset huts were built on the hill near the Rugby Club. As well, Whitestrand Quay and slipway were constructed. 137 officers and 1793 men were based at Salcombe. 66 ships and many auxiliary vessels sailed from Salcombe on 4 June 1944, as part of "Force U" which landed on Utah Beach, Normandy. Afterwards, Shadycombe Creek and Mill Bay were used to repair damaged landing craft. The base closed on 7 May 1945, and a plaque was set up in Normandy Way to commemorate the United States Navy. Salcombe and district suffered a number of bombing raids during the war.

The former radar station at Bolt Head, near Salcombe, was set up to be used as the Regional Seat of Government in the event of attack during the Cold War. It has now been dismantled.

There have been many changes to the Salcombe Waterfront since World War II, the most noticeable being the construction of the Creek car and boat park, and the road to Batson. Salcombe became an urban district following an Act of Parliament in 1972.

== Marine facilities and activities ==
=== Harbour ===
The Pier and Harbour Order (Salcombe) Confirmation Act 1954 established the harbour as a statutory harbour under local authority ownership (i.e. a municipal port) and conferred powers on the urban district council of Salcombe (which was later to be incorporated into the South Hams District Council) to "authorize the Council to construct works to maintain manage and improve the said harbor and estuary and to levy tolls rates and charges and for other purposes."

In 2014 the European Sea Ports Organisation awarded the harbour Eco-Port status.

=== Bar and RNLI lifeboat ===
Towards the mouth of the estuary is the Bar, a spit of sand protruding from the east bank which is exposed at low spring tides. In this state of tide and with strong southerly winds the bar can make the entrance to the estuary dangerous.

It is believed that Lord Tennyson's famous poem "Crossing the Bar" was inspired by a visit to Salcombe during the 19th century. The poem begins with the lines,

Sunset and evening star and one clear call for me!
And may there be no moaning of the bar,
When I put out to sea

The moaning refers to the noise of the water breaking over The Bar. Salcombe Lifeboat Station was established by the Royal National Lifeboat Institution in 1869. In 1916 the Salcombe lifeboat, an open rowboat "The William and Emma", capsized crossing The Bar resulting in 14 of the 15 crew's lives being lost. However another crew was soon formed and the station continues to this day. There is Tamar-class all-weather boat and an Atlantic 85 inshore boat. The original lifeboat station on South Sands is no longer used and there is a lifeboat museum and shop in Salcombe town, at the lifeboat station itself.

=== Beaches ===
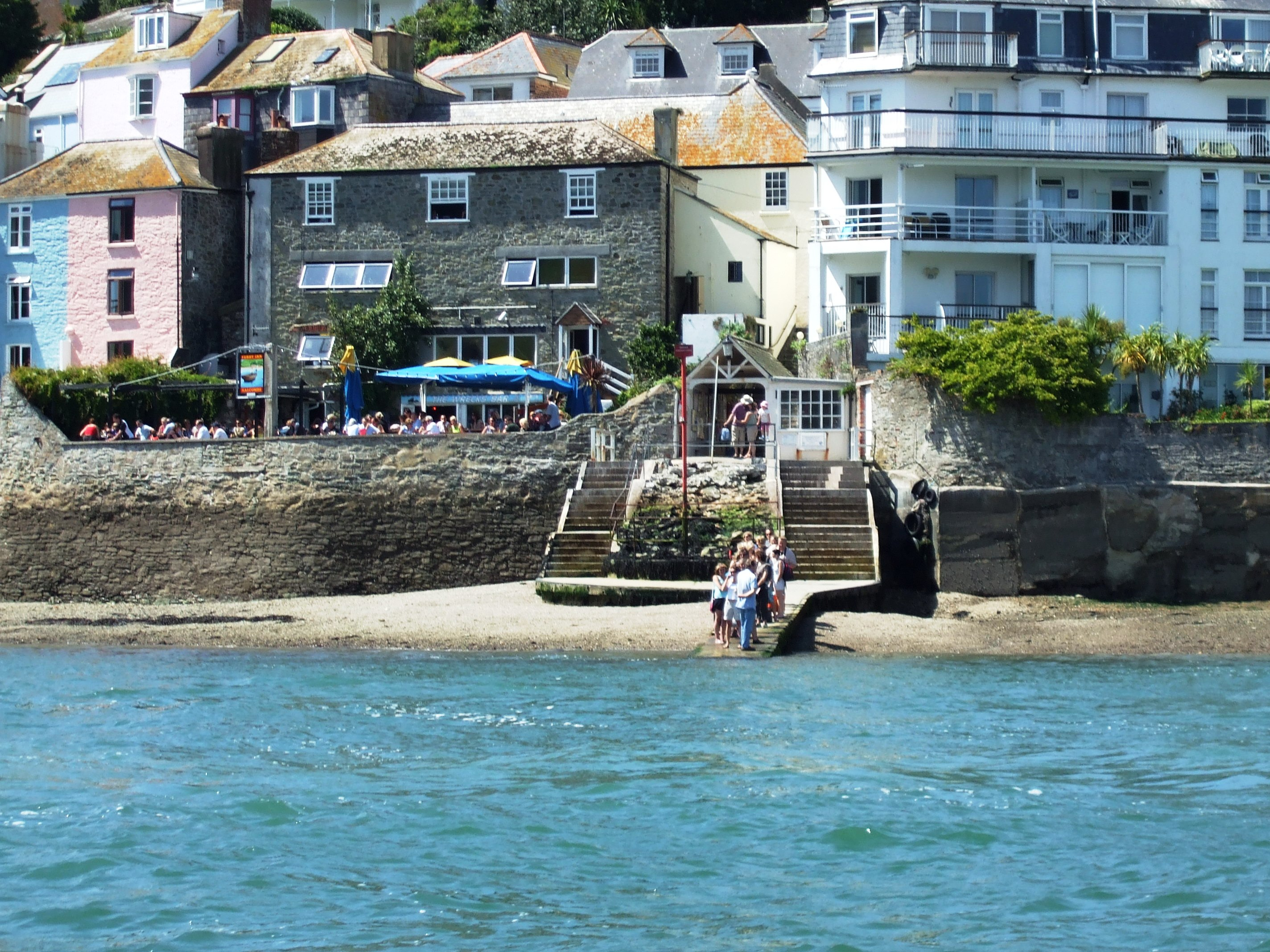
The Jubilee Pier at Salcombe

Further into the estuary on the east side is a series of popular sandy beaches: Sunny Cove (nearest the bar), the large Mill Bay, Cable Cove (the landing point of a cross-channel cable), Small's Cove and Fisherman's Cove. Adjacent to Fisherman's Cove is a landing slip used by the ferry — open-topped clinker-built motorboats — from Salcombe directly across the estuary, communicating with the hamlet of East Portlemouth. From here there is access to the South West Coast Path.

Opposite the Bar on the west side of the estuary are the beaches of South Sands and North Sands. A picturesque ferry operates between Salcombe and South Sands, with a Sea Tractor ferrying passengers between the boat and the South Sands beach. South Sands beach has been awarded the coveted Blue Flag Beach status for several years. The adjacent North Sands and Mill Bay beach opposite share the same high standards of cleanliness and water quality but have not sought the award because of cost considerations.

North of North Sands Salcombe town begins, occupying the steep west side of the estuary opposite the beaches and East Portlemouth and extending north and west into the first of the estuary's many creeks: Batson Creek by Snapes Point. Others, including Southpool Creek and Frogmore Creek, branch off to the east and north east, while the main channel continues to Kingsbridge itself. A larger boat operates in the summer as a ferry between Salcombe and Kingsbridge when the state of the tide permits. Salcombe now also has spread down the west side of The Berry below the main road to Malborough.

=== Sailing and other marine-based activities ===
Burgee of the Island Cruising Club of Salcombe, established in 1951.

Although Salcombe harbour hosts a small but active shell fishing fleet of approximately 20 boats (the largest of which is less than 20m in length) the harbour is primarily a recreational leisure port which accommodates approximately 1600 residential yachts and power vessels, and which welcomes around 6,000 visiting vessels a year (2015 figures). There are no commercial vessels which ply their trade in this harbour, predominantly because the Bar at the harbour entrance limits the maximum draught (and hence size) of visiting vessels. The estuary is a relatively sheltered body of water upon which a wide variety of marine pursuits take place: Standup Paddleboarding, kayaking, yacht and dinghy sailing and racing are popular activities, as is swimming from one of the many beaches within the estuary. The harbour has inspired its own class of dinghy known as the Salcombe Yawl.

=== Salcombe Sailing Regatta ===
Salcombe Yacht Club hosts the Salcombe Yacht Club Regatta every August, attracting up to 400 dinghies in 10 or more dinghy classes plus handicap fleets. The Salcombe Yawls take pride of place as they were all designed and built in Salcombe using traditional boatbuilding techniques. The sailing regatta classes include: Fast & Asymmetric Handicap, RS200, Medium Handicap, Enterprise, Larks, Laser Standard, Laser Radial, Topper, Junior Handicap, National Twelve, Salcombe Yawls, Solos and Cruisers.

=== Salcombe Town Regatta ===
The Salcombe Town Regatta and sailing regatta take place on the same fortnight as each other. The order in which they run switches each year and usually coincides with favourable tidal conditions for the various events.

The Salcombe Town Regatta encompasses many activities. Family friendly events include mud races, the cross harbour swim, fun-run, rowing races, swimming gala, sandcastle competition, fishing competition, water treasure hunt, land-based treasure hunt, spot the bloomer, crabbing competition, fireworks, Crabbers Race, torchlight procession, children's sports and family fun day, fancy dress parade and air displays. Occasionally the Red Arrows are booked to perform over the estuary.

== Economy ==
Due to its unspoiled beauty, sandy beaches and harbour facilitating sailing and yachting, Salcombe has one of the highest average property prices in the UK, soaring above Sandbanks, Poole in recent years. Many of the shops, bars and restaurants in the town, especially towards the waterfront, cater for a predominantly well-off, fashionable and nautically-inclined clientele, with prices to match. There are many clothes shops and art galleries. Salcombe has hotels and bed and breakfast establishments as well as self-contained apartments and houses which help its population soar from approximately 1900 in the winter months to nearly 25,000 during the height of the summer.

Salcombe has a number of boatyards and marine stores, while boats are stored on the carpark by the fishing quay during the winter. There is a power boat school and SCUBA diving is popular, although consent from the harbour office must first be obtained to ensure safety. The town and yacht club regatta weeks are one of the main features of the summer season. There are races for dingies and yachts as well as crabbers in addition to other activities. Salcombe Estuary Rowing Club is a member of the Cornish Pilot Gig Association and takes part in races around the south west.

Fishing is still carried out at Salcombe, mostly of shellfish. About 2,000 tons a year were landed between 1986 and 1990.

The Marine Hotel was bought in 2012 by the Harbour Hotel Group and transformed into the Salcombe Harbour Hotel at a reported cost of £12million. In 2012, Galliford Try Building Ltd. was appointed by Estura on a construction project at the hotel, in which the customer failed to submit a payment notice on time in accordance with the Housing Grants, Construction and Regeneration Act 1996, leading to the court case of Galliford Try Building Ltd v Estura Ltd. This is one of the leading cases on construction payment law in the UK. Fourteen villas and apartments were constructed in front of the refurbished hotel and sold off-plan in 2012–2014 at prices were from £1.2 to £2.85 million. Some villas are used exclusively by the owners and others are rented out as holiday lets.

Stores include Salcombe Gin, Fat Face, Joules, Musto, Henri Lloyd and White Stuff. Fashion brand Jack Wills was founded in 1999 at 22 Fore Street.

Salcombe is also home to Cranches, the oldest sweetshop in Devon.

== Media ==
Local news and television programmes are provided by BBC South West and ITV West Country. Television signals are received from the Caradon Hill, Beacon Hill and the local relay site.

Local radio stations are BBC Radio Devon on 103.4 FM, Heart West on 101.2 FM and Greatest Hits Radio South West on 105.5 FM.

The town is served by the local newspaper, Kingsbridge & Salcombe Gazette which publishes on Fridays.

== Facilities ==
Because of the narrow streets and the priority given to pedestrians, a park and ride scheme operates during the summer from the outskirts of Salcombe. This service does not operate in the off-peak season but is instead signposted as 'park and walk'. A small airfield, Bolt Head Airfield, is located one mile (1.5 kilometres) southwest of the town centre – the site was previously occupied by RAF Bolt Head during the Second World War.

The Salcombe Maritime Museum, founded in 1975, has information on the fruit schooners and other items of interest. Since 1991, the museum has occupied the ground floor of the former council offices. Temporary exhibitions are arranged each summer mainly with loaned items.

By South Sands is Overbeck's a house and gardens belonging to the National Trust. In the house are inventions of Otto Overbeck.

Salcombe has numerous walking routes nearby and is on the South West Coast Path. It is also on the National Cycle Network route 28 from Okehampton to Plymouth.

Other facilities include a gin distillery known as Salcombe Gin.

=== Sports ===
A 20-metre outdoor heated swimming pool forms part of the Salcombe Primary School and is open during the summer season. The rugby club on Camperdown Road is a centre of activities during the winter. Salcombe Town Football Club, re-formed in 2010, play their home games in the nearby village of Malborough.

== Gallery ==
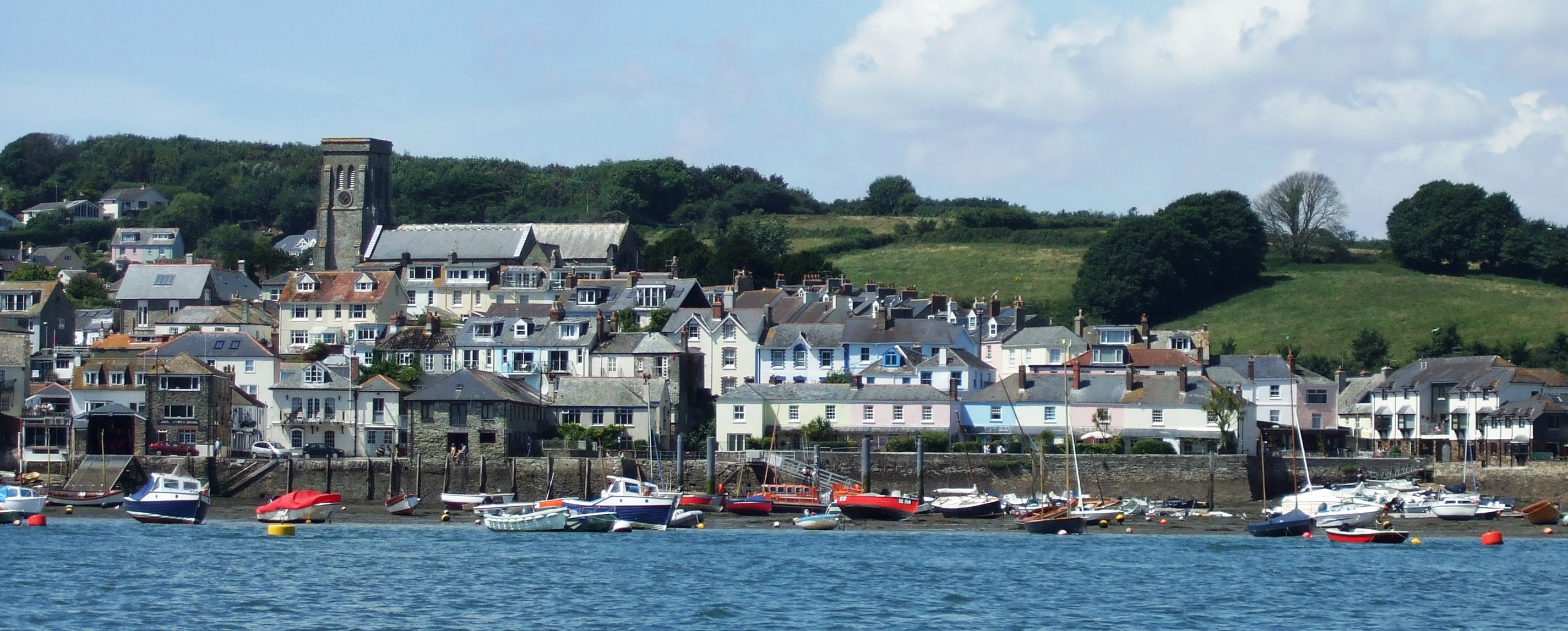
Salcombe showing the church

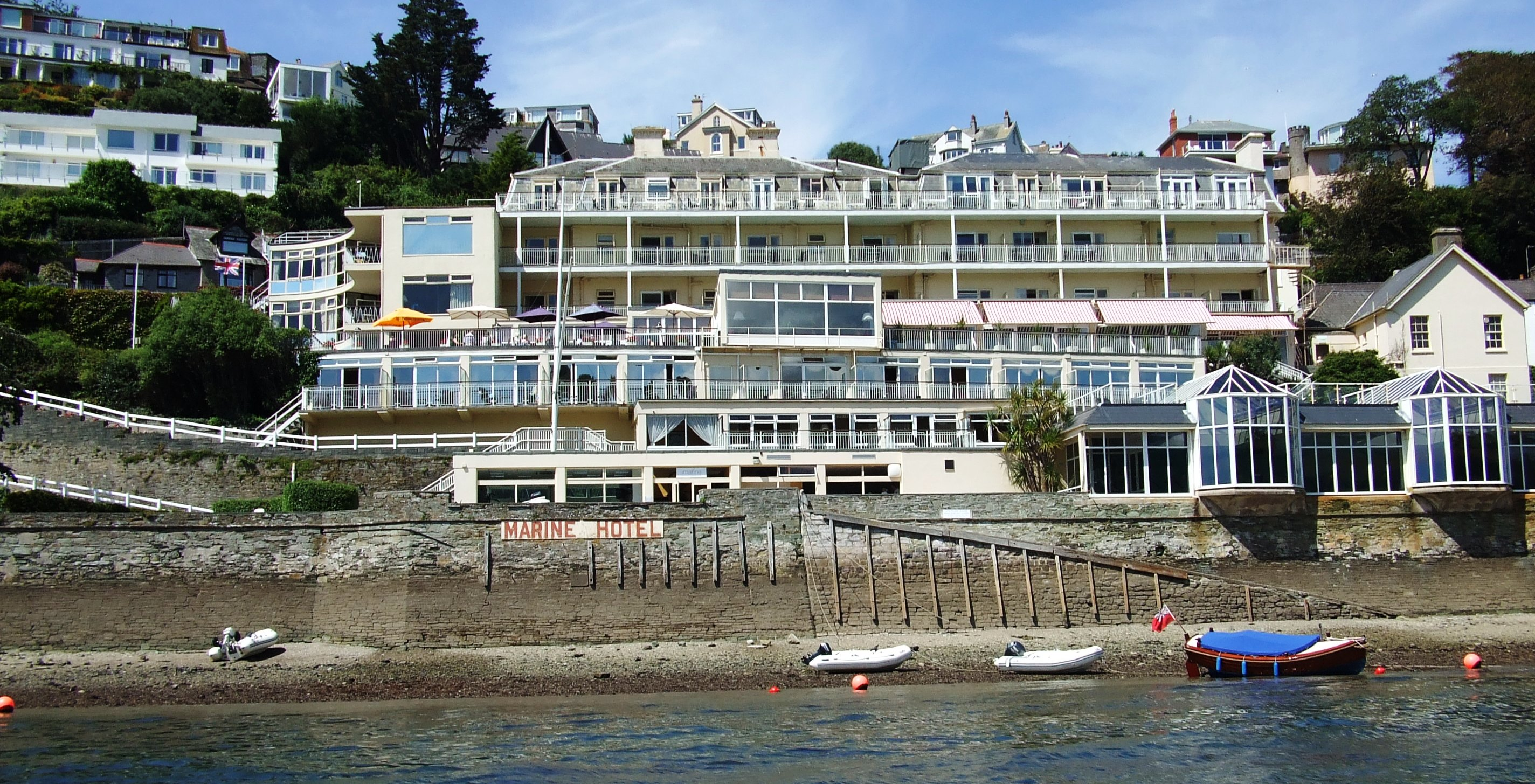
Marine Hotel

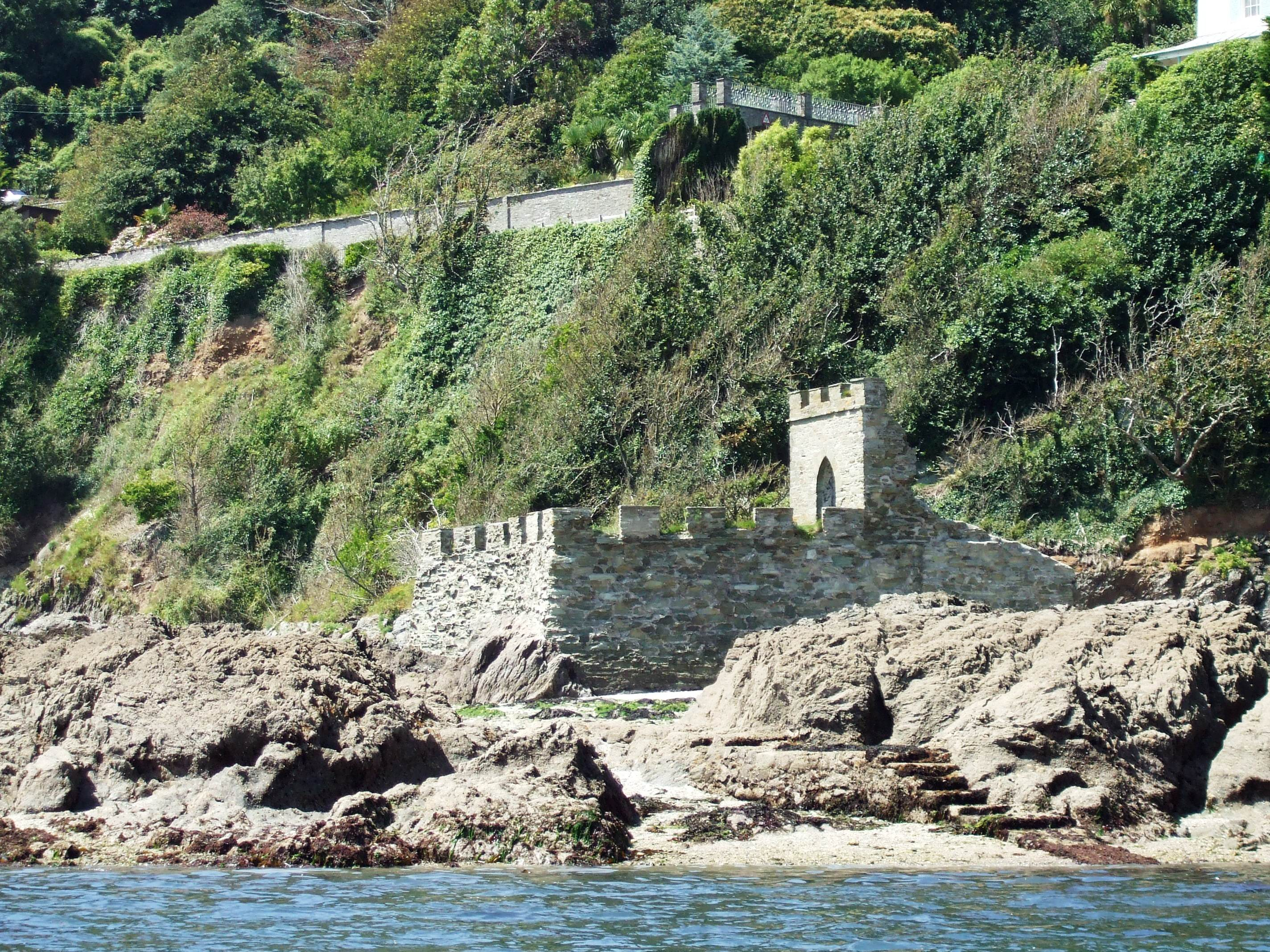
Fake gun battery

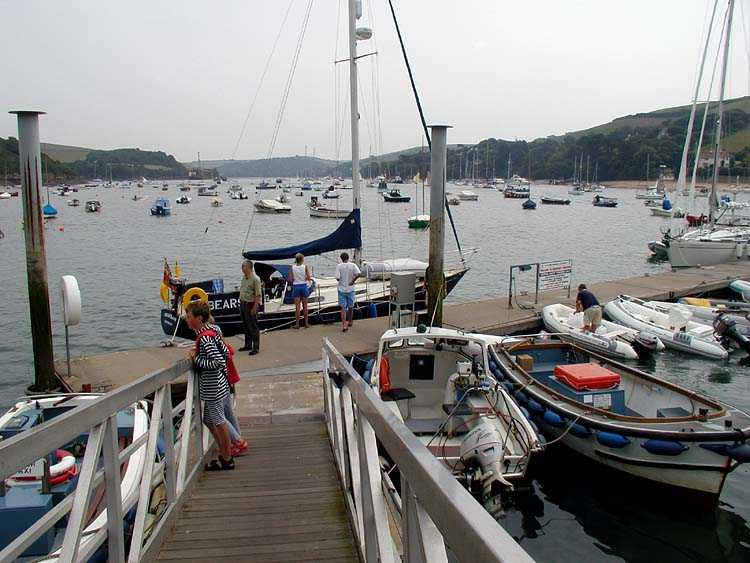
Normandy pontoon

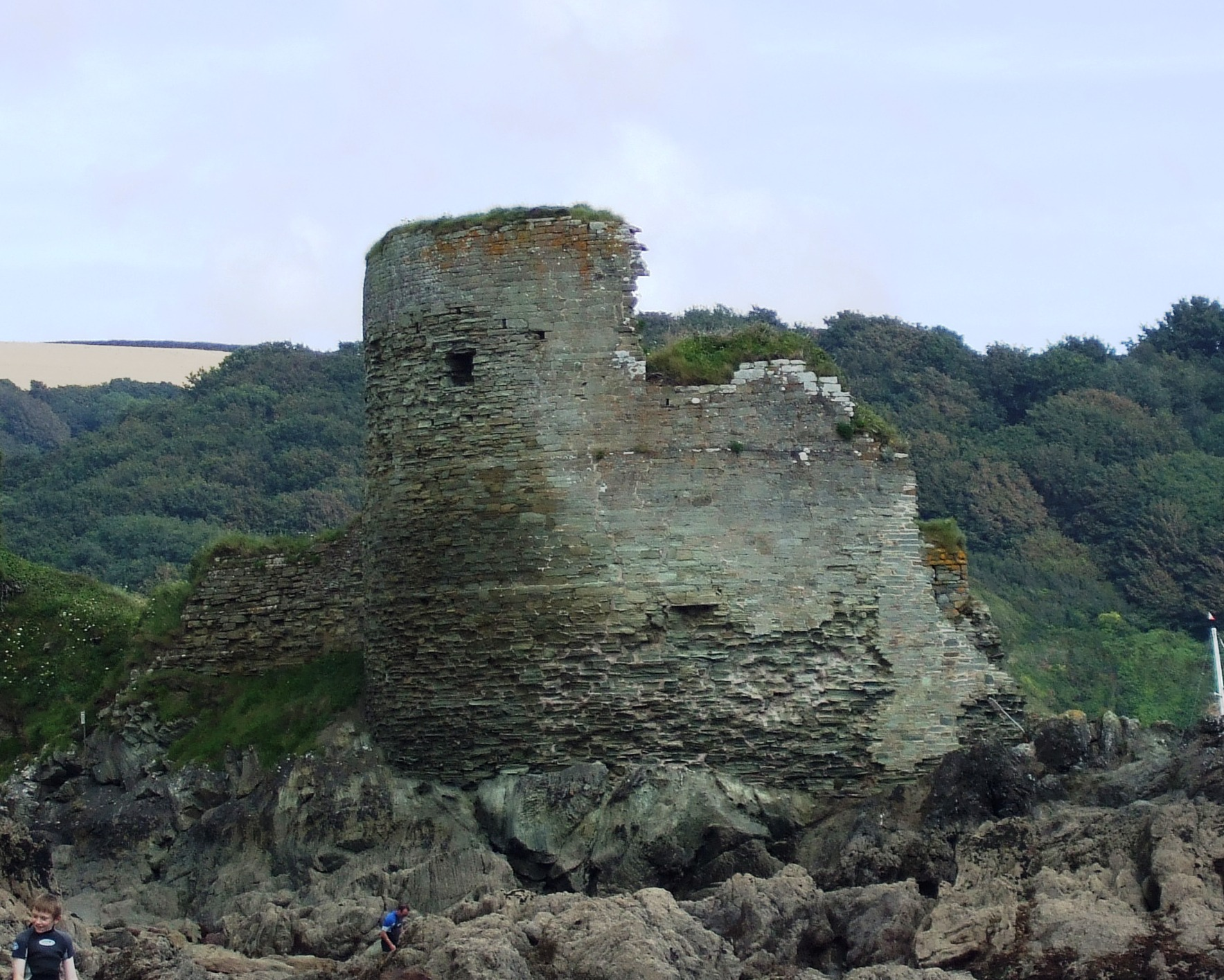
Ruins of Fort Charles

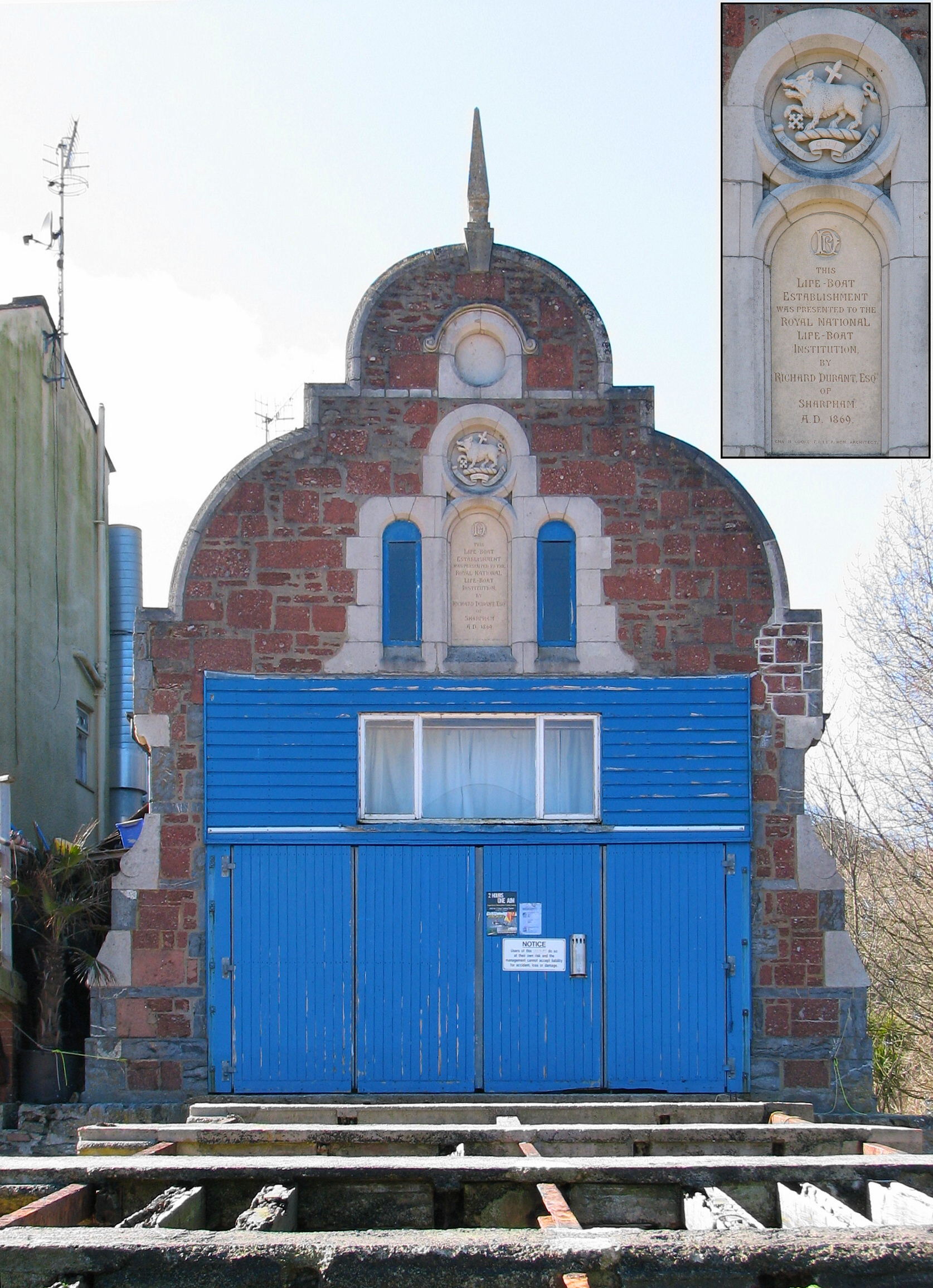
The old lifeboat station on South Sands

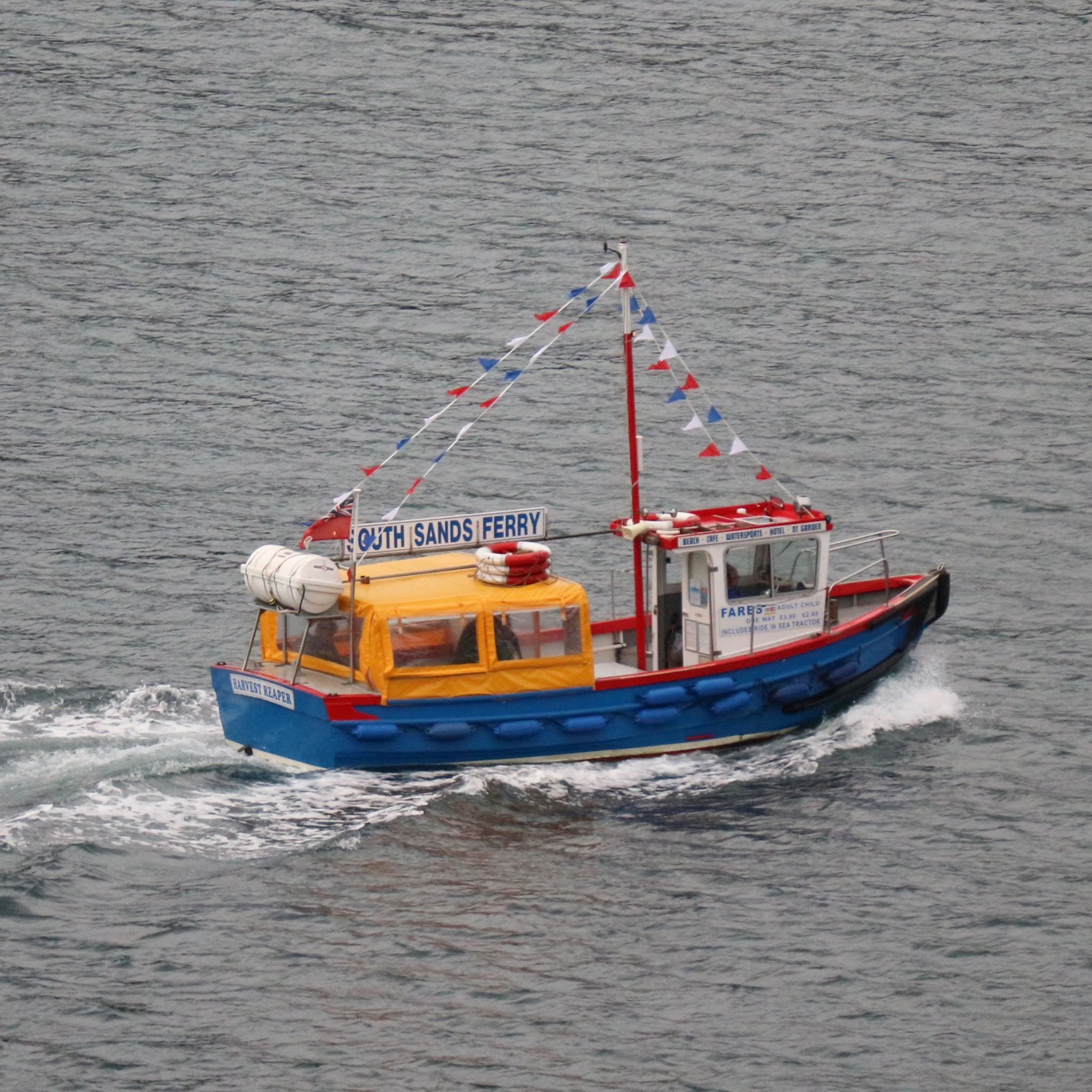
The ferry to South Sands
