= Elemér Bokor =

Hungarian entomologist

Elemér Bokor (19 January 1887, Sátoraljaújhely, Zemplén County – 1 September 1928, Budapest) was a Hungarian entomologist who specialised in Coleoptera.

Bokor worked on cave fauna. His collection of Palaearctic beetles is in the Hungarian Natural History Museum.

== Works ==
- Új vakbogarak Magyarország faunájából. Annales Musei Nat. Hung. XI. 1913. *Három új vakbogár Magyarország faunájából. Annales Musei Nat. Hung. XI. 1913.
- A vak Trechusok szeméről. Rovartani Lapok, XXI., 1914.
- A magyarhoni barlangok ízeltlábúi. Barlangkutatás, IX., 1921.
- Az Abaligeti-barlang. Földr. Közl. LIII., 1925.
