= Pál Bokor =

Hungarian writer and journalist

Pál Bokor (Budapest, 2 May 1942) is a Hungarian journalist, writer, translator and the director of Atlantic Press Publishers.

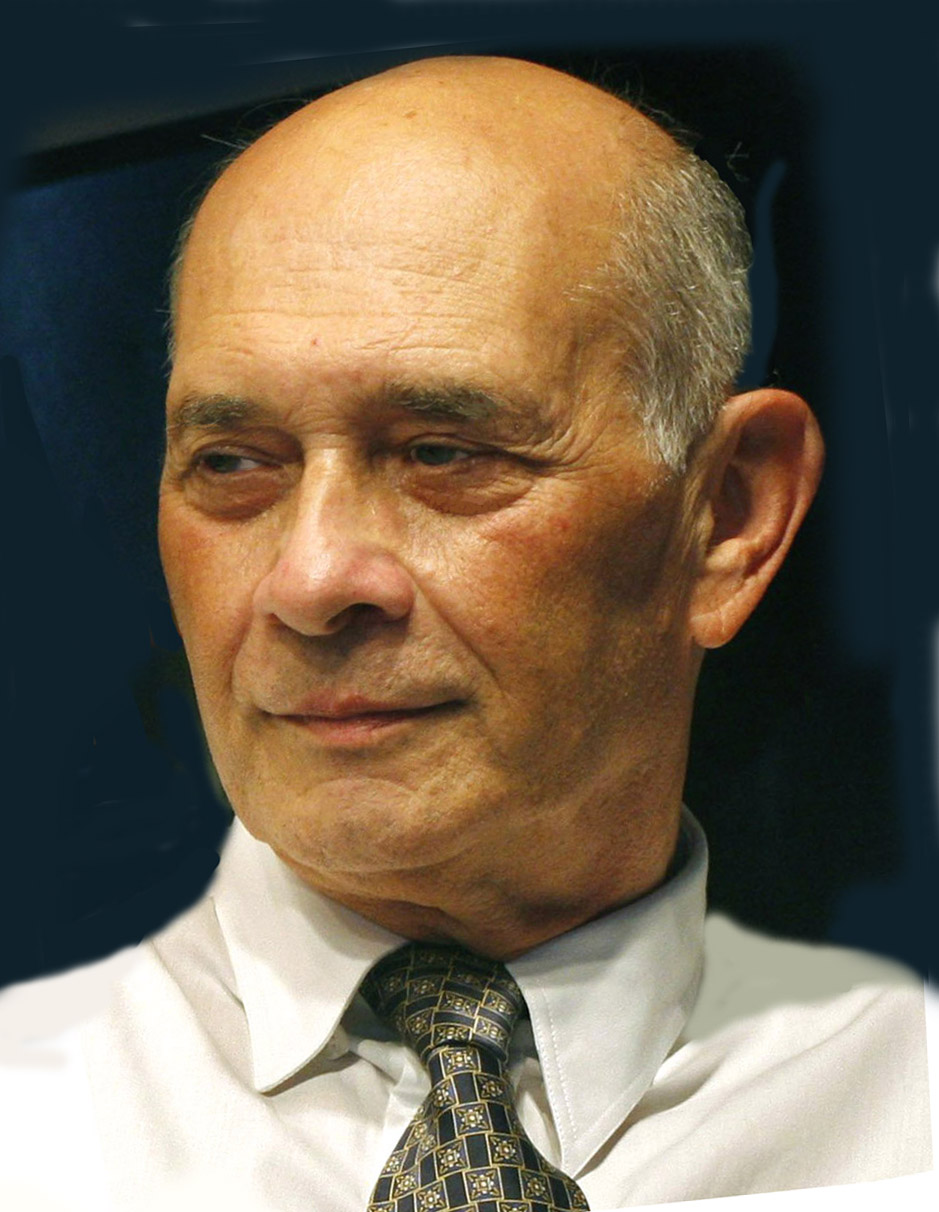

== Biography ==
Bokor graduated in Radnoti Miklos High School in 1960 and proceeded to become an intern of the Magyar Távirati Iroda (MTI), the Hungarian News Agency the same year. He enrolled in the School of Journalism of Association of Hungarian Journalists and studied aesthetics and art history in Budapest and in Moscow. He spent the 1970s to the 1980s working as a correspondent for MTI. He is the only Hungarian reporter who wrote a comprehensive report book about both the Soviet Union, the United States and China the three superpowers of the 20th century. He wrote a political crime novel (The Panda, 1980) as a mirror of cynicism in big politics, held back in publication until 1988 by secret police when it was released in a record 110 thousand copies.

Following the Revolutions of 1989, he became interested in filmmaking. He wrote screenplays and created a documentary for the Hungarian National Television on the Rwanda War. He produced the film 'Vademberek' (An Island of Their Own, 2001), a drama dealing with the subject of xenophobia. He inaugurated the first independent press agency in Hungary (Atlantic Press), organized an independent press photo agency (Ecofoto), edited and published multiple times the most comprehensive English language handbook on Hungarian film production (Shoot In Hungary), and organized the Association of Hungarian Producers (MPSZ).

As a journalist he was first to publish the credible version of the story of Raoul Wallenberg's death, which articles won him the Price of Excellence of the Association of Hungarian Journalists (MÚOSZ). In the 2000s (decade) he mostly writes literary and foreign political pieces in the weekly Élet és Irodalom. He wrote a portrait book on Barack Obama half a year before the 2008 elections. Since 2004 he is working on a major book describing an alternative film theory, "Film As Movement".

=== Other activities ===
He served as Vice Chairman of the Supervising Committee of the Association of Hungarian Journalists (1987–89). In 1996 he initiated and organized the First International Meeting of Hungarian Filmmakers. In 2003, he organized the Alliance of Hungarian Producers and was selected as a member on its Presidential Board. He was a jury member on the Palić International Film Festival in 2004.

== Works ==
=== Journalism ===
He was an MTI and Hungarian National Television correspondent in Moscow, Washington, as a special correspondent covered the Sino-Vietnamese War in 1979 and the Rwanda War in 1994 among others. In the 1970s he was a regular contributor of the Hétfői Hírek, the Bratislava Új Szó in 1990's of the Maariv Tel-Aviv. In 1985 he started to publish in Magyar Hírlap, from 1993 also in Népszava and 168 óra. From 2000, he also publishes essays in Könyvjelző and Élet és Irodalom.

=== Literature, translation ===
==== Books ====
- Vlagyivosztok, Kamcsatka, Szahalin (report book, Kossuth, 1978)
- Egy kínai nyár (report book, Kossuth, 1979)
- Washington (report book, Kossuth, 1985)
- Ezüst Malibu (report book, Gondolat, 1987)
- A panda (novel, Magvető, 1988)
- Shoot in Hungary (film industry handbook, Atlantic Press, 1996–2004, I-III. Edition)
- A siker neve Oscar – Nyolcvan éves az Oscar-díj (Atlantic Press, 2007)
- Barack Obama szupersztár (Atlantic Press, 2008)
- A siker helye Hollywood – Mozi, művészet, pénz, hatalom (Atlantic Press, 2008)
- A siker titka a sztár - A Hollywood-galaxis állócsillagai (Atlantic Press, 2009)
- Obama - Az út Honolulutól a Fehér Házig, és mindig tovább (Atlantic Press, 2010)

==== Translations ====
- The Hound of Baskerville (novel, Arthur Conan Doyle, Alexandra, 2007)
- Lady Ligeia (short story, Edgar Allan Poe, Alexandra, 2007)
- Emily Dickinson's poems (Élet és Irodalom, 2007)
- My Promised Land, Avi Shavit, Atlantic Press Kiadó, 2013

=== Films ===
==== Documentaries ====
- Here America Begins (writer, producer, director, 1983, MTV)
- John Bosco's Rwanda (writer, producer, director, 1994, MTV)
- Just Like Hollywood (1998, HBO, producer)

==== Features ====
- Vademberek (An Island of Their Own, 2001, producer)
- Morfium (Morphine, 2005, producer)

==== Screenplays ====
- Báthory Erzsébet szerelmei (drama, 2002, with Éva Pataki)
- A waterlooi győzelem (comedy, 2004)

=== Film aesthetics ===
- Film as Movement – Thoughts on the aesthetics of modern film (pending)

=== References ===
- Interjú Bokor Pállal
- Az Atlantic Press honlapja

=== Sources ===
- Ki kicsoda (MTI 2008)
- A magyar közélet kézikönyve (MTI 2004)
- Magyar Filmlexikon (Magyar Nemzeti Filmarchívum, 2005)
