= Salcombe Yawl =

Type of sailing dinghy

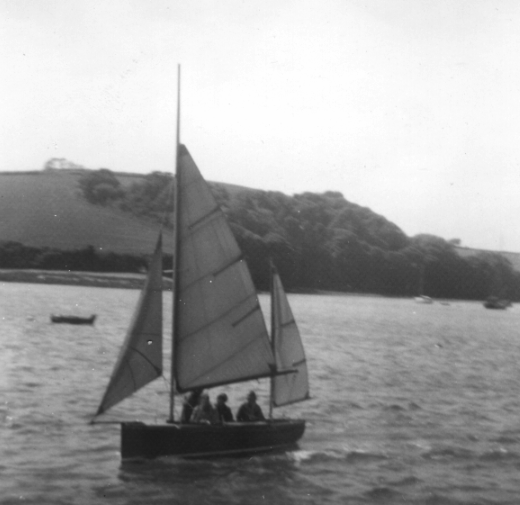
- A Salcombe Yawl, reefed, crewed by teenagers on the Kingsbridge Estuary in 1967

Development
- Location: Salcombe, Devon
- Year: 1938

Boat
- Crew: 2-3

Hull
- Type: Monohull
- Hull weight: 381 kg (840 lb)
- LOA: 4.88 m (16 ft 0 in)
- Beam: 2.13 m (7 ft 0 in)

Rig
- Rig type: Ketch

Sails
- Total sail area: 16.24 m^{2} (174.8 sq ft)

The Salcombe Yawl is a small sailing dinghy restricted class native to Salcombe in South Devon, and also to the traditional sailing vessel from the area upon which that class was based, with a 200-year history. The current class of vessel has about the size of a Merlin Rocket, that is 4.88 metres (16.0 ft) and about 180 have been built of which 80% are still in use.

== Design ==
It is built traditionally by hand from mahogany, and is clinker built. The centre plate is cast iron, but more recent Yawls have bronze plates. While it is rigged as a ketch with the mizzen ahead of the rudder post, the label yawl is probably derived from a corruption of the word yole, meaning a small inshore fishing boat. Designers work within the class restrictions, adding innovations to each vessel.

It is raced in two classes depending on the age of the boat. A newly built boat in 2009 would cost £40,000 while a second hand vessel would be half of that.

There is a glassfibre derivative with aluminium spars called a Devon Yawl. The mould for this was taken from a 1968 Salcombe Yawl and because of the nature of its construction is a one-design. There are approximately 300 Devon Yawls and they are built both in the UK and USA.
