= Jozsef Bokor =

Hungarian electrical engineer

Jozsef Bokor from the Hungarian Academy of Science, Budapest, Hungary was named Fellow of the Institute of Electrical and Electronics Engineers (IEEE) in 2012 for contributions to system identification and multivariable control system design.
