= Salcombe Castle =

Ruined coastal fortification in Devon, England

Coordinates: 50.2289°N 3.7765°W

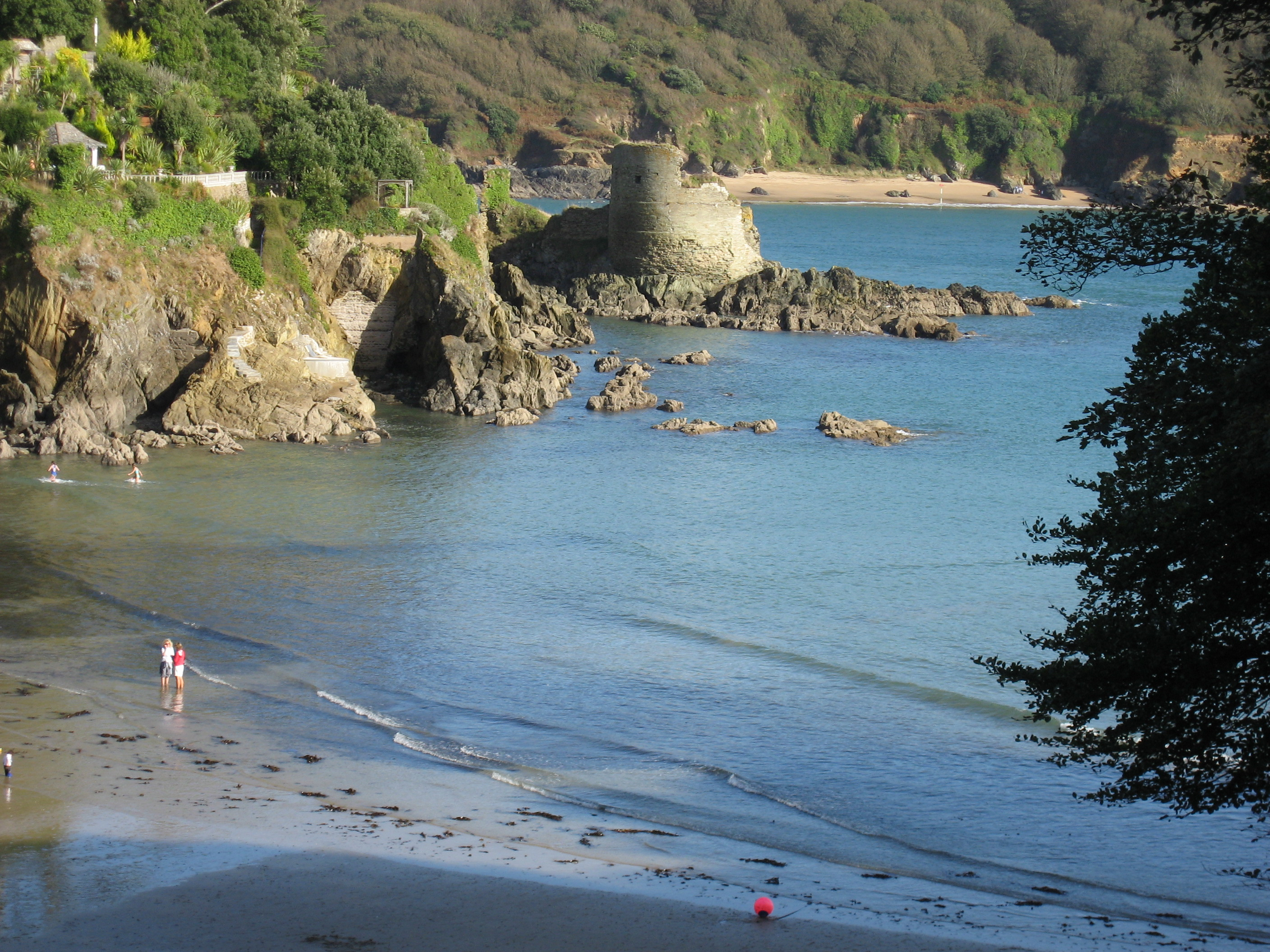
Salcombe Castle from North Sands

Salcombe Castle or Fort Charles is a ruined fortification just off the beach of North Sands in Salcombe, Devon, England, within the South Devon Area of Outstanding Natural Beauty. It is located on a rocky outcrop which is easily reached on foot at low tide. It is a Grade II listed building and ancient monument.

The ruined structure includes a four-story 7 metres (23 ft) semicircular tower with gun ports near the top. It is connected by a section of wall to a rectangular tower which is 6 metres (20 ft) high.

== History ==
Salcombe Castle, first called the Bulwark, was originally built between 1535 and 1539 as a gun battery, with seven gun embrasures. It was built by subscription under Viscount Courtenay's direction for protection against the French raids, not as part of the ‘Kinges Works’ of King Henry VIII, (26 volumes) under which most of the batteries and castles in the South and South West were built. It is thought that its build was overseen by Thomas Treffry of Fowey, who also oversaw several other coastal defences. It was built on a rocky promontory with no easy access, so a causeway stretching around the coast from Salcombe village had first to be constructed, of which signs still remain where they had to cut through various rocks, some still clearly visible, especially where it passes the little Woodcot Folly castle. Since then there is no record of the French attempting another raid there, so it seems to have been a success.

During the Civil War, it was twice raided by Parliamentary ships, and even once on July 12, 1645, surrounded, when the ship the ‘James’ with a force of 200 men, slipped out of Plymouth on an ebb tide and light south-westerly and sailed round to Salcombe where she anchored. The soldiers were disembarked and marched into Salcombe, where an officer called on the Castle to surrender. But when presumably the tide came in, the soldiers were re-embarked and returned to Plymouth, where they arrived on the 15th.

In 1646, its Royalist governor, Col. Sir Edmund Fortescue of East Allington, held out for nearly five months when it was besieged by Parliamentary forces under the overall command of Col. Weldon from Plymouth, together with Col. Richard Inglesby, who had brought his regiment, with its three guns, over from besieging Dartmouth. The guns were mounted on the top of Rickham Common, above Sunny Cove. The three emplacements may still be found under the brambles there. In March heavier guns were brought up from Plymouth under the command of Col. Weldon, by then its Parliamentary Governor, which was ambushed briefly at Pin End, the eastern end of the causeway across the River Avon from Aveton Giffard, by the Royalist Vicar William Lane. They were then mounted in what is now the Italian garden in The Moult garden, where a special track had to be dug and built (still in existence) straight down Moult Hill and down what is now the top Moult drive to take them. It had proved impossible to get them and their carriages and horses around the corners of the old winding track. With no hope of relief and with supplies running low, on 7 May the Royalist garrison finally surrendered Fort Charles.

Although the castle was slighted after its surrender, it still remained in operation as a gun battery until at least 1717, (“Survey of Plymouth and District 1717 in the British Library) at which time it was mounting five guns on gun carriages (two of which were unusable), 1 X 5 1/4 lb. 6 ft 10 stone; 1 X 5 1/4 lb. 6 ft. 11 stone; 1 x 5 1/4 lb. 6 ft. 6ins, 11 stone; 1x4lb X 6 ft. 13 stone and 1 X 3 lb. 4 ft, 3 Stone, mounted on carriages, identified as former ship’s guns, and presumed to have been recovered from nearby shipwrecks.

== Gallery ==
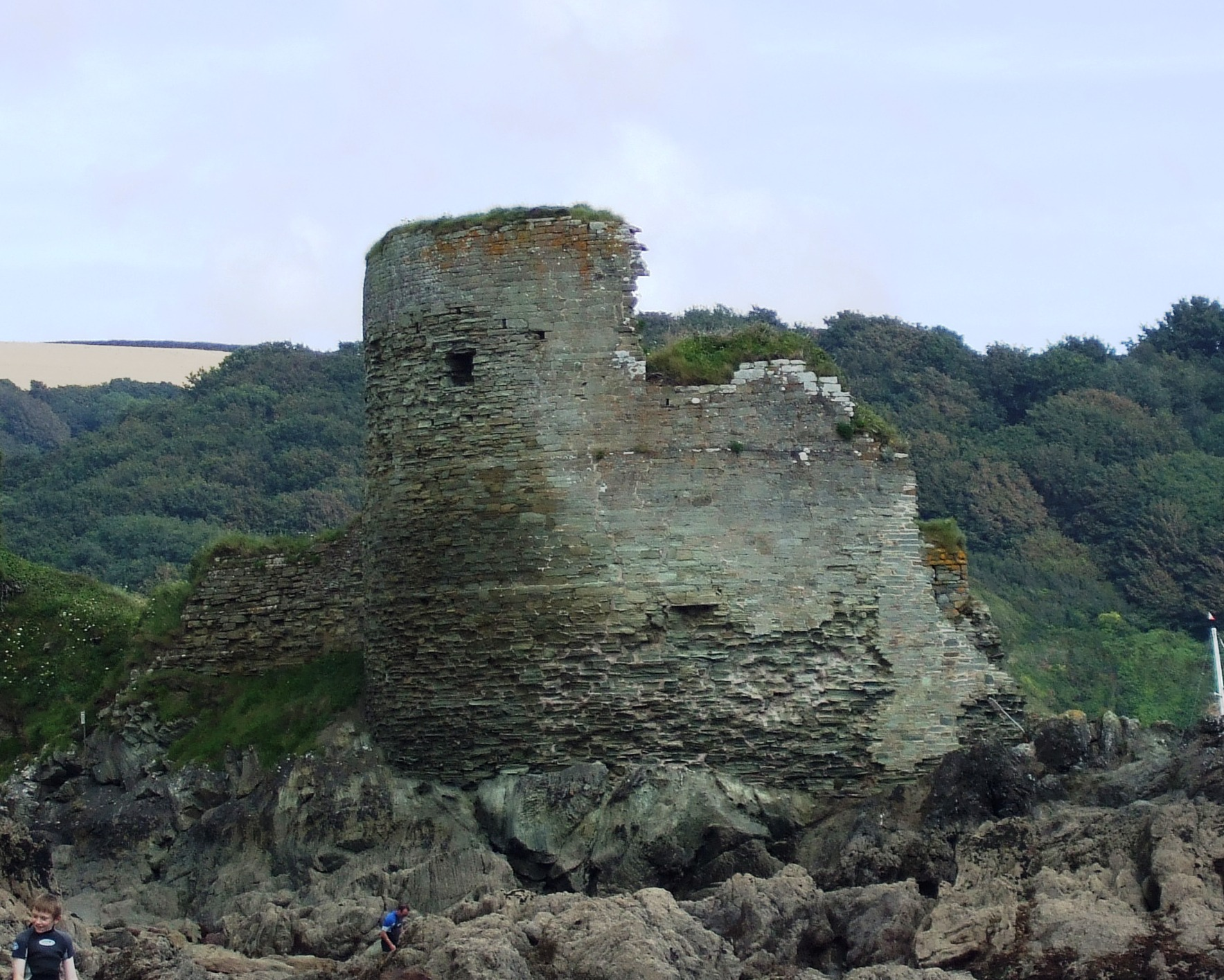
Ruins taken from North Sands

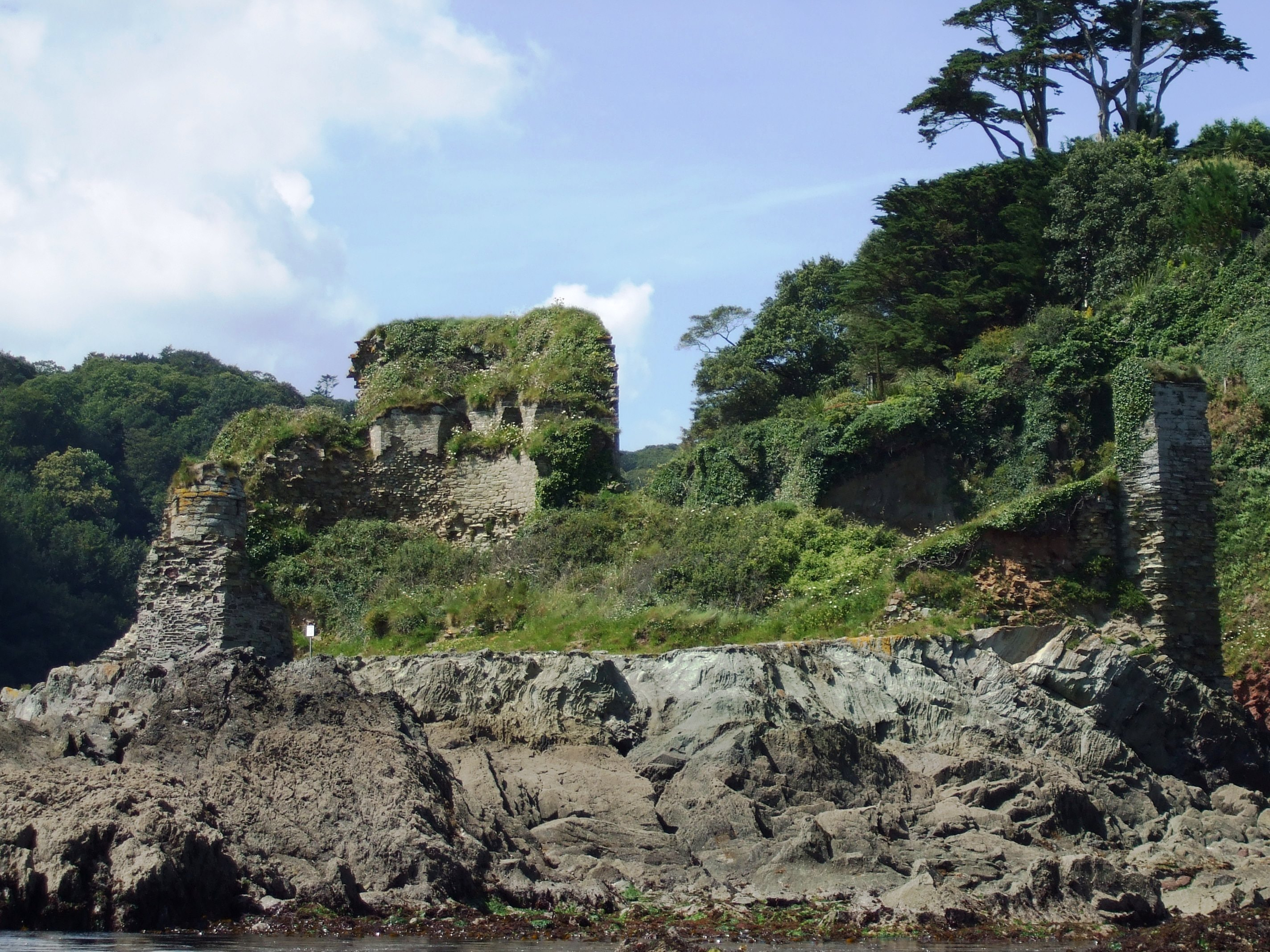
Taken from a boat in the estuary
