= Péter Török (biologist) =

Hungarian biologist and researcher

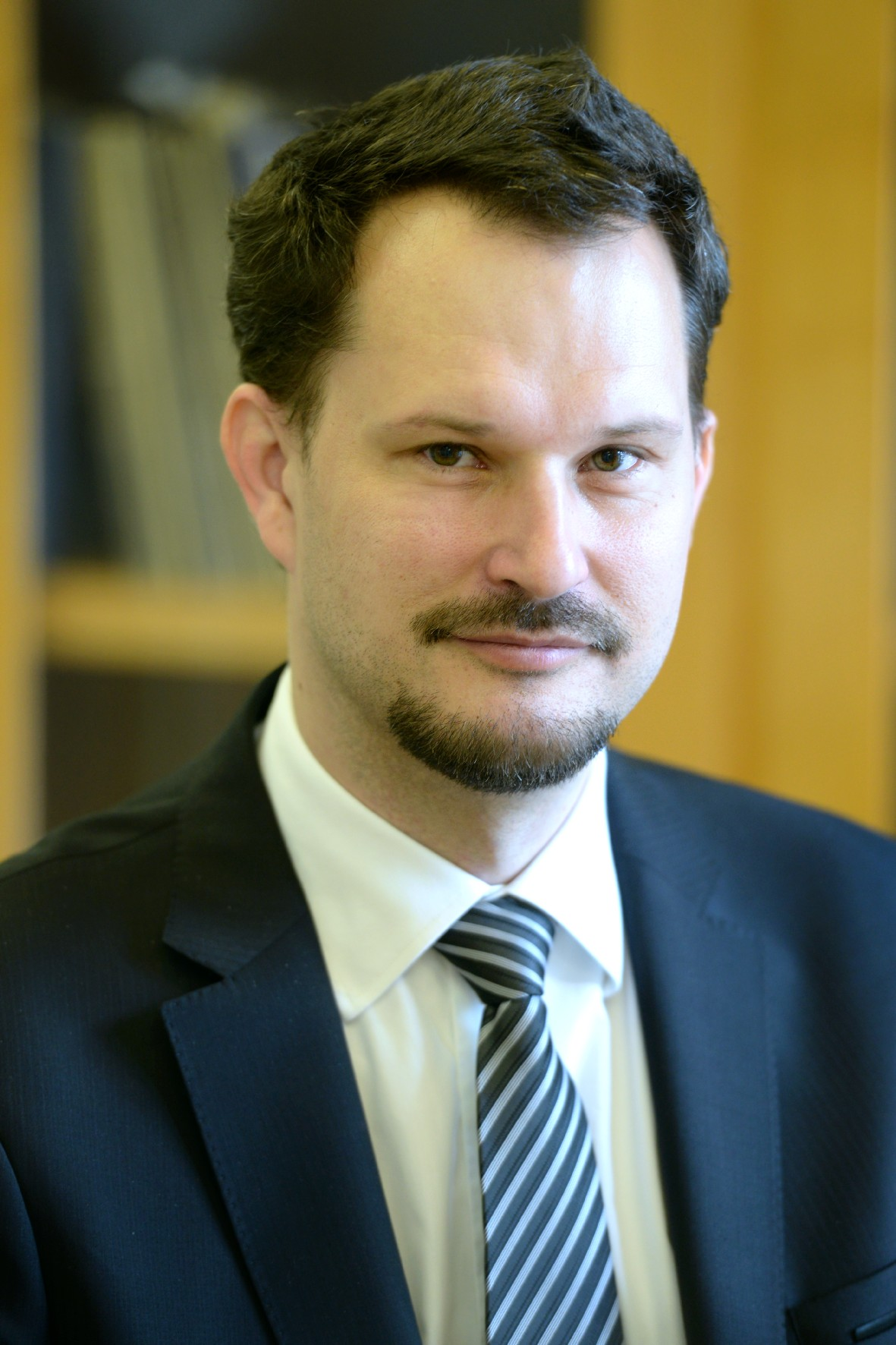
- Péter Török
- Born: 22 October 1979 (age 45); Körmend, Hungary
- Education: PhD in Botany
- Awards: Youth Award HAS (2014)
- Scientific career
- Fields: Botanist
- Institutions: MTA-DE Lendület Functional and Restoration Ecology Research Group University of Debrecen

Péter Török (born 22 October 1979) is a Hungarian biologist. He completed his Ph.D. degree in botany from the University of Debrecen, where he is the principal investigator of the MTA-DE Lendület Functional and Restoration Ecology Research Group., supported jointly by the Hungarian Academy of Sciences (MTA) and the University of Debrecen (DE). He is a founder and the co-president (2019-2021) of the Young Academy of Hungary. In 2016 he was awarded by the title ‘Doctor of the Hungarian Academy of Sciences’. He is a member of the Young Academy of Europe (2017-), the council of the International Association for Vegetation Science (IAVS, 2019-), and one of the chairs of its European Dry Grassland working group (2011-). He was a board member in the European Chapter of the Society for Ecological Restoration (SER)

== Research areas ==
- Dynamical processes in plant communities
- Biodiversity of Palaearctic grasslands
- Grassland restoration and management
- Seed banks and spatial dispersal of vascular plants
- Functional diversity of phytoplankton and benthic diatom communities.

== Bibliography ==
- List of publications at Google scholar
- List of publications at Scopus
- List of publications at Publons
