= Lukáš Bokroš =

Slovak ice hockey left winger

- Born: September 9, 1982 (age 43)
- Height: 5 ft 11 in (180 cm)
- Weight: 185 lb (84 kg; 13 st 3 lb)
- Position: Left wing
- Shot: Left
- Played for: MHK Dubnica; HK Dukla Trenčín; HKM Zvolen; MHC Martin; Ours de Villard-de-Lans; HC Zlín
- Playing career: 2000–2014

Lukáš Bokroš (born September 9, 1982) is a Slovak former professional ice hockey left winger.

== Career ==
Bokroš played six games for HC Zlín of the Czech Extraliga during the 2006–07 season. He also played in the Tipsport Liga for HK Dukla Trenčín, HKM Zvolen, MHC Martin and MHK Dubnica as well as in the Ligue Magnus for Ours de Villard-de-Lans.

Bokroš played in the 2000 IIHF World U18 Championships for Slovakia.
