= Stumbles =

Stumbles (also spelt Stumbels) is a family name probably originating in the United Kingdom but nowadays also found in Australia, South Africa, Zimbabwe, Canada, and the United States.

== Origin ==
A Dictionary Of British Surnames lists a Gervase atte Stumble of 1296 and a Juliana Stumbel of 1311 and suggests a meaning (derived from Old English stumbel) of "Dweller by the tree-stump".

The name was found relatively frequently in the West Country especially the South Hams region of Devon from the early 18th century. It is now rare in the United Kingdom but found more commonly in Australia, New Zealand, Canada, South Africa, USA, and Zimbabwe.

== Stumbles people ==
- William Stumbels (c. 1700–1769), clockmaker
