= Salcombe Cannon Wreck =

Marine archaeological site in the Erme Estuary, Devon

Coordinates: 50.213288°N 3.738951°W

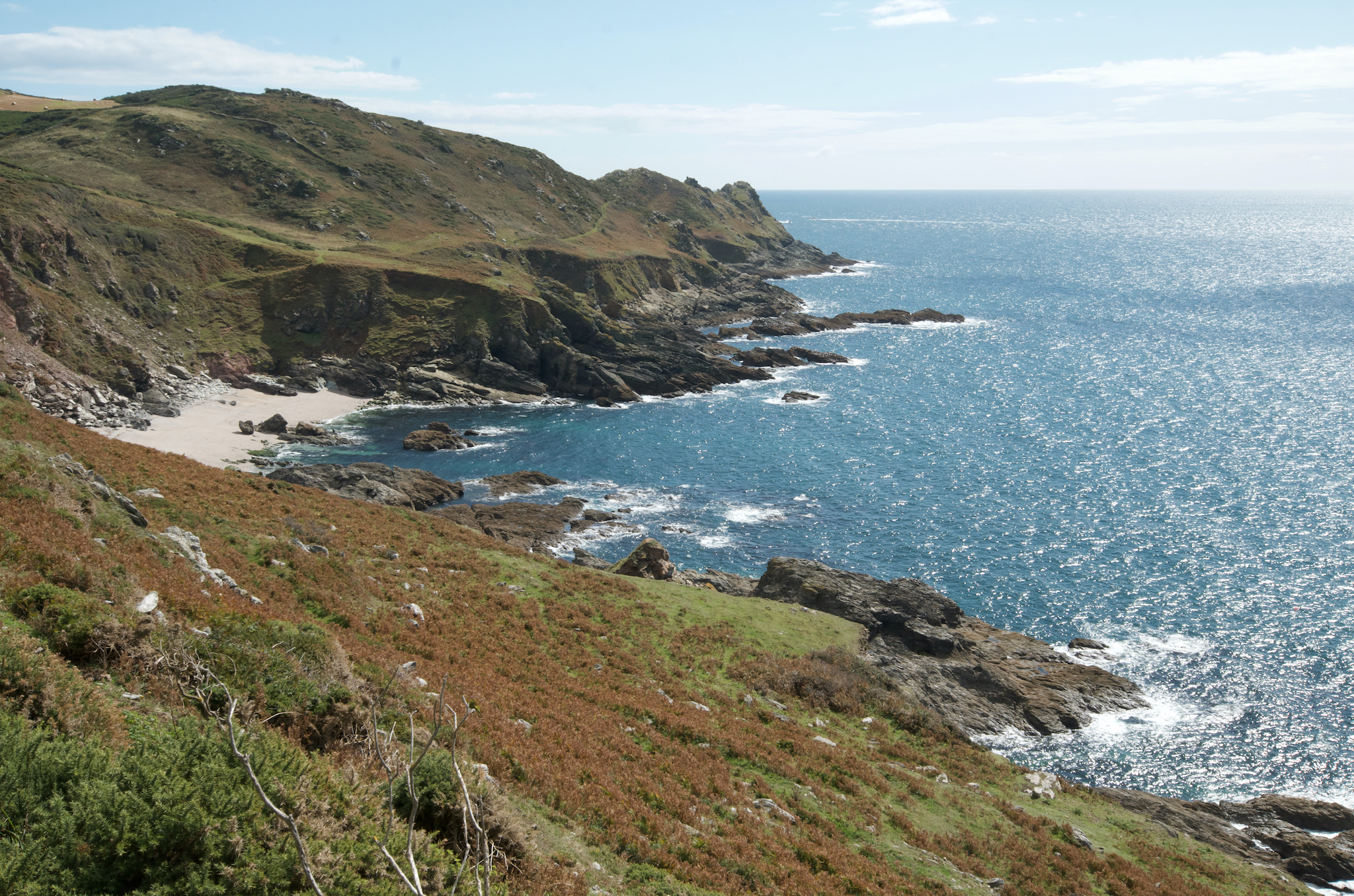
Salcombe Cannon Wreck Site

The Salcombe Cannon wrecksite is close to two other designated wrecksites in the Erme Estuary which the South West Maritime Archaeological Group (SWMAG) was licensed to investigate. In 1992 this group described the Salcombe Cannon site as:

"A cannon site with nothing else visible".

In 1994, following seabed changes, other artifacts including gold were revealed and the SWMAG began recording the site. Coins and jewellery dating between 1510 and 1636 have been recovered from the site and were purchased by the British Museum in 1998. For two seasons information about the site was initially kept confidential between the Receiver of Wreck, the finders and the Archaeological Diving Unit (working for the Advisory Committee on Historic Wreck). The site was designated under the Protection of Wrecks Act in 1997 when news about it was made public. The wreck is a Protected Wreck managed by Historic England.

The vessel is unknown but is dated between 1630 and 1640, and it has yielded the largest ever find of Moroccan gold in Europe.

The site has been surveyed and recorded using traditional survey methods, magnetometer, multi-beam sonar and photo-mosaic.

== Salcombe B Bronze Age Shipwreck ==
In 2004, divers working on this site discovered Bronze Age artifacts, including swords, axes, tools, and ornaments. The finds date from around the 13th century BC and could be from the same source as the nearby Moor Sands finds. This Salcombe B site has not been separately designated as it lies within the protected area of the Salcombe Cannon site.

== Media coverage ==
- BBC2 Timewatch: White Slaves, Pirate Gold 10 January 2003
- Radio 4:Diving into History January 2002

== See also ==
- Archaeology of shipwrecks
- Underwater archaeology
- List of designations under the Protection of Wrecks Act
- Moor Sand site
