= Zsuzsa Bokros-Török =

Hungarian volleyball player (born 1947)

Personal information
- Full name: Zsuzsanna Bokros-Török
- Nationality: Hungarian
- Born: 5 March 1947 (age 78); Budapest, Hungary

Sport
- Sport: Volleyball

Zsuzsanna "Zsuzsa" Bokros-Török (born 5 March 1947) is a Hungarian volleyball player. She competed in the women's tournament at the 1972 Summer Olympics.
