= Polyphon =

Disc-playing music box

A Polyphon playing "Silent Night" (the music starts 68 seconds into the video)

A Polyphon is a disc-playing music box. The machine was invented in 1870; it was first manufactured by the Polyphon Musikwerke, in Leipzig, Germany, full-scale production having started about 1896 and continuing into the early 20th century. Polyphons were exported all over the world; music was supplied for the English, French, German markets, as well as further afield, with pieces cataloged for the Russian, Polish, and Balkan regions. Polyphon is also a record label as registered by German Polyphon Musikwerke AG in 1908. Polyphon traded under the Polydor label since 1913 with their trademarks Polyphon Musik and Polyphon Record.

== Polyphon Musikwerke ==
The German company was founded in 1887 in Wahren, Leipzig, as Firma Brachhausen & Riesener, by Gustav Adolf Brachhausen and Ernst Paul Riessner, for manufacturing their 1870 invention mechanical disc-playing music box Polyphon. The company was renamed to Polyphon-Musikwerke AG in 1895. In 1908 Hugo Wünsch was appointed director, but became head of the new subsidiary Deutsche Grammophon AG in 1918. On April 24, 1917, Polyphon-Musikwerke AG acquired the Deutsche Grammophon-Aktiengesellschaft record plant from the German government. The German state had taken over DG and British holdings during World War I on the grounds that they were enemy property. The factories Deutsche Grammophon and Polyphon-Musikwerke were handled by Polyphonwerke AG, and headquarters were relocated to Berlin, with the new corporate entity taking the name Polyphon-Grammophon-Konzern.

In 1918, Polyphon AG established its head offices in Markgrafenstraße 76 in Berlin. Bruno Borchard became director general. The early owner Joseph Berliner remained as member of the boards until his retirement in 1921. In 1919 the Austrian subsidiary Polyphon-Sprechmaschinen und Schallplatten GmbH was founded in Vienna. It was as renamed Polyphon Schallplatten Ges. mbH. The Danish Nordisk Polyphon A. S. was founded in Kopenhagen. In Stockholm the Swedish subsidiary was called Nordisk Polyphon A. B. The ownership of foreign activities were concentrated in March 1929 into a Swiss holding company the Polyphon-Holding AG. In 1932 this holding was renamed to Polydor Holding AG.

The owner Polyphon Werke AG was merged with Deutsche Grammophon AG in 1932, and the total shutdown of the production in Leipzig followed soon thereafter. In 1933 DG sold its shares of Polydor Holding. In 1937 the company renamed itself to Deutsche Grammophon GmbH. A capital merger operation took place by a consortium of Deutsche Bank and Telefunken Gesellschaft. In 1932 founded Telefunken Platte GmbH got a production plant as it was needed. DGG was sold to the German Siemens & Halske AG electronics company in 1941. In 1954, DGG established a subsidiary in London, Polydor Records Ltd. In 2000, the French media company Vivendi SA acquired the current owner Universal Music Group from Seagram.

== Polyphon music box ==
Original examples still exist of 1870-invented Polyphon and contemporary manufacturers produce small quantities of both the devices and discs.

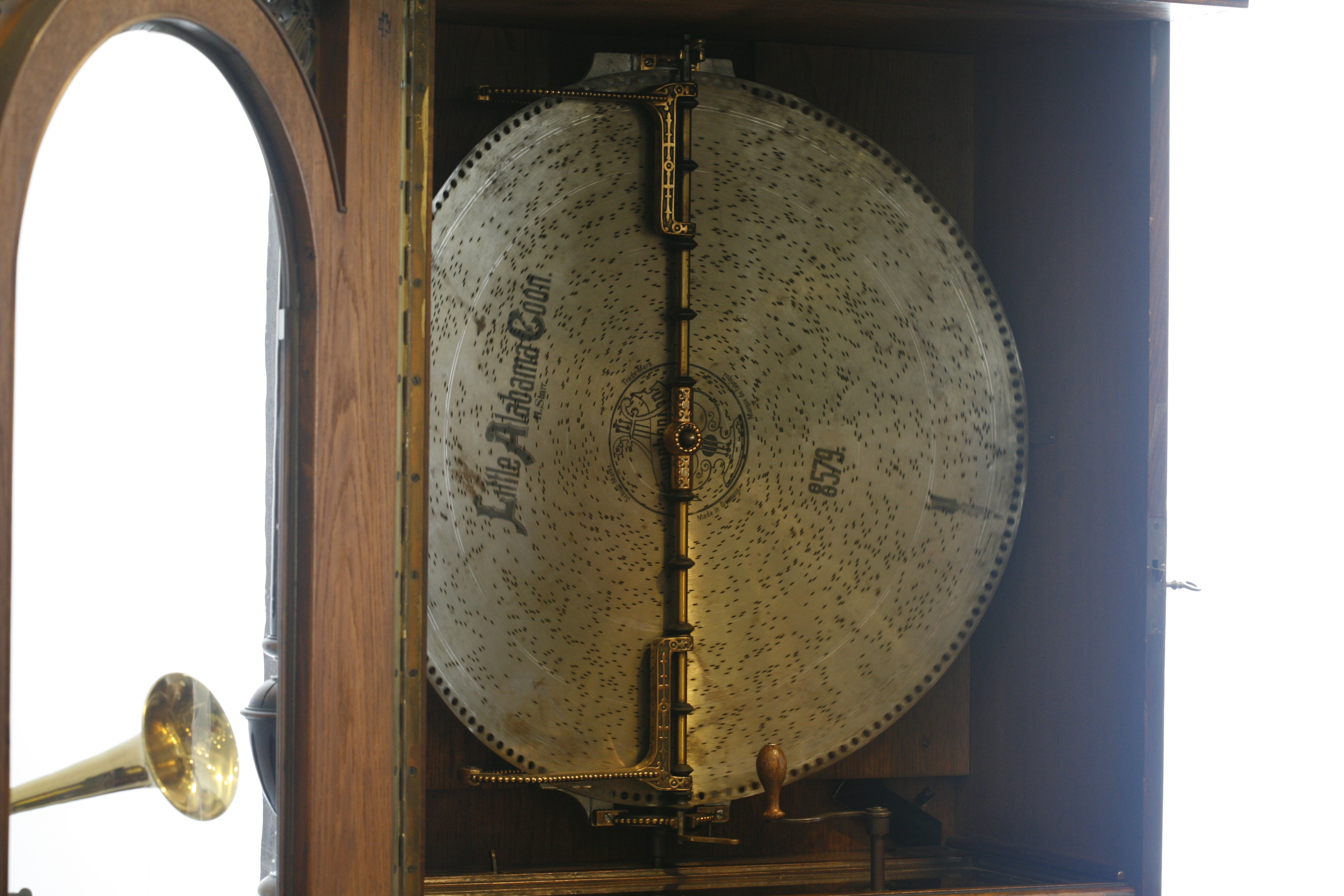
A Polyphon is a large disk-operated music box. The plectra protrude from the backside of the disk. As the disk rotates they contact a ratchet mechanism that plucks the tines. A large sounding board amplifies the sound. Many interchangeable disks were available for producing favorite melodies.

=== Making music ===
The tune is punched out on the disc with pitch determined by the position of the punching. In the manufacturing process, the punched metal was curled back onto the underside of the disc, creating a raised projection that resembles a letter A when viewed obliquely. When the Polyphon operates, the resulting disc projections, called plectra, engage with a series of ratchet-like star wheels, each with 9 projections, that sit in a gantry. Each star wheel, when moved through 40 degrees on its axis, plucks a tooth on the instrument's comb. The tooth resonates, sounding a predetermined note.

Upon the musical comb, the fast treble notes are sounded furthest from the centre and the slower bass notes nearest the centre. Many comb variants were manufactured, including a single comb on smaller instruments, and duplex combs (simultaneous strike) on mid-sized examples of 11-inch-diameter and 15.5-inch-diameter instruments. Most larger twin-combed examples had alternate strike although other manufacturers, notably Symphonion, produced large size instruments with duplex combs.

=== Motor ===
Almost without exception, all Polyphons are powered by a hand-wound clockwork motor. Polyphon may have devised an electric motor variant of a large coin-operated model in the latter days of production, but to date, no known original examples exist. The motor has an output drive dog, which is a circular component with round-topped dowels arrange to fit the holes in the discs. Discs of small diameter have two centrally located holes (centre drive), while larger discs had a series of holes around the periphery (peripheral drive).

During operation, a disc is placed on the centre post, or centre boss, a pressure bar goes over the disc to hold it in place and the drive dog revolves the disc. The playing time for each disc varies, dependent upon the diameter. For example, the running time of a 19.5/8 inch-diameter disc (50 cm) is about 1 minute and 50 seconds.

=== Modern availability ===
Numerous sizes of Polyphons and associated discs were produced, with the diameters ranging from 6 inches to 24.5 inches. It is possible to purchase new discs, currently manufactured in the UK by Renaissance Discs, for every size of Polyphon originally produced. Originals have survived in relatively large numbers, and are often available on internet sales sites.

== Polyphon Musik ==
Polyphon disc records and machines followed in Germany 1905 and in England in June 1908. The trade mark was registered in Britain in 1900. Earlier Polyphon overstamped their place of origin. Polyphon as a label was founded in Leipzig on 8 September 1908 (registered Nr. 110347). In England their Klingsor Records label were repressed under Polyphon around 1910. In June 1913 the label was changed to Pilot.

Polydor label was founded 2 April 1913 in Leipzig and registered on 25 July 1914 (Nr. 316613). For example, Polyphon Musikwerke entered into Persian market in 1927. In 1927 Polyphon Musikwerke recorded 200 matrices in Iraq followed by making 600 recordings in Tehran. Their agent the Hakkak company opened shops in Baghdad, Tehran and Kermanshah. Polyphon Musik and Polyphon Record had unique issue series in 36 countries or areas within decades. In 1931 agreement with Polyphon gave for Decca exclusive British licence to records on this label.

Since 1946 Polydor has been the popular music arm, while the new Deutsche Grammophon Gesellschaft label was going to be a classical music label in 1949. The previous used label Grammophon was disbanded.
