= List of shipwrecks of England =

This is a list of shipwrecks located off the coast of England.

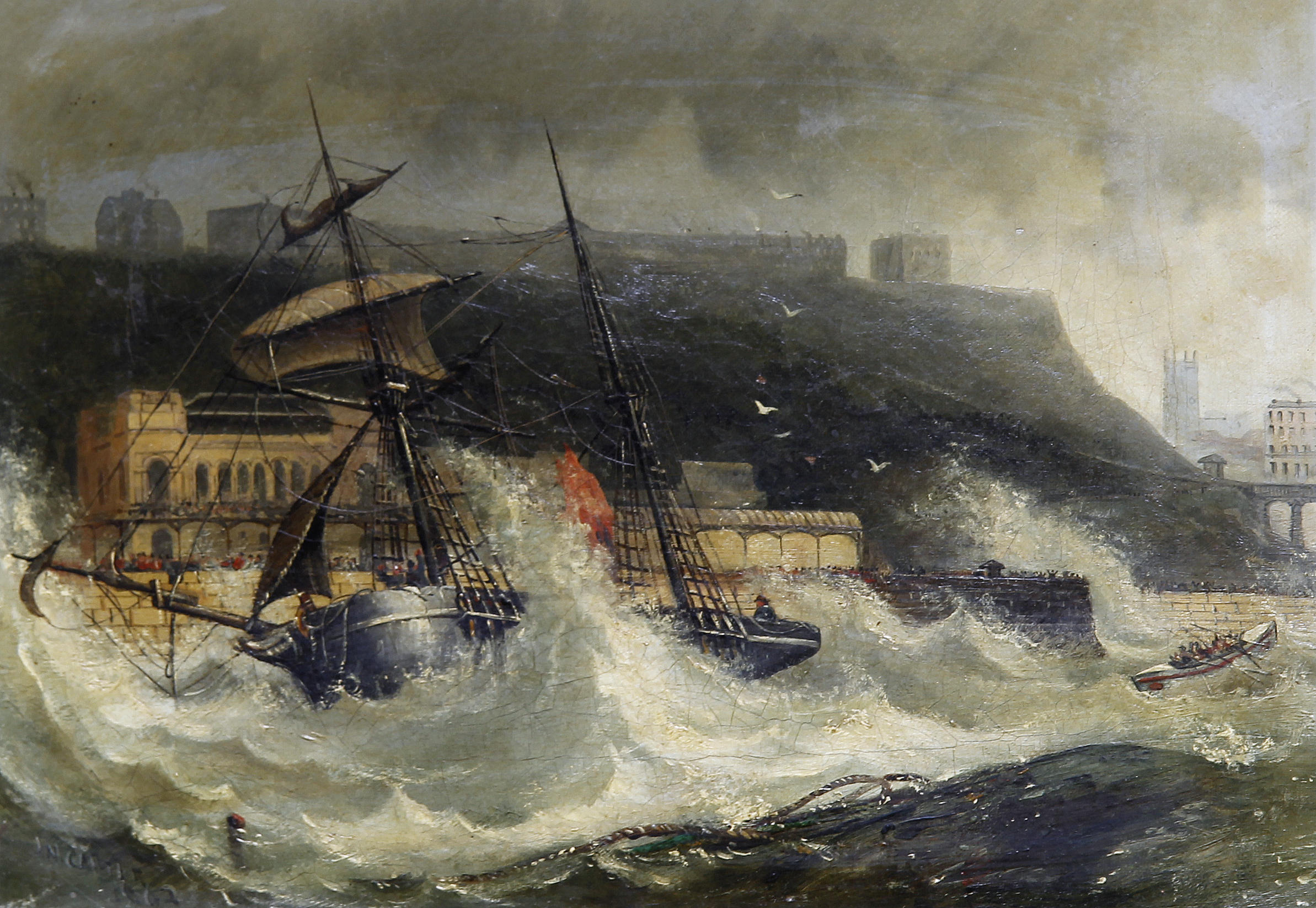
The wreck of the Copeland of South Shields, at Scarborough, 2 November 1861 (painting by Joseph Newington Carter)

== East ==
=== Essex ===
Ship	Flag	Sunk date	Notes	Coordinates
HMS Dundalk	Royal Navy	16 October 1940	A Hunt-class minesweeper that struck a naval mine and foundered under tow off Harwich.	52°3′N 1°48′E
Terukuni Maru	Japan	19 November 1939	A Japanese ocean liner that struck a German naval mine off Harwich.	51°50′N 01°30′E

=== Norfolk ===
Ship	Flag	Sunk date	Notes	Coordinates
HMT Agate	Royal Navy	6 August 1941	A trawler that ran aground on Haisborough Sands.	52°53′N 01°43′E
Alf	Norway	23 November 1909	A Norwegian barque that ran aground on Haisborough Sands.	52°54′N 01°43′E
Cantabria	Spain	2 November 1938	A Spanish cargo ship that was sunk by the Spanish Nationalist auxiliary cruiser Nadir northeast of Cromer, during the Spanish Civil War.	53°1′58″N 1°31′57″E
English Trader	United Kingdom	26 October 1941	A merchant ship grounded on Hammond Knoll.	
HMT Force	Royal Navy	27 June 1941	A naval trawler that was sunk by German aircraft off Winterton Ness.	52°48′55″N 001°47′48″E
Gallois	United Kingdom	6 August 1941	A merchant vessel that ran aground on Haisborough Sands.	52°54′N 01°43′E
Georgia	Netherlands	20 November 1927	An oil tanker that ran aground on Haisborough Sands.	52°52′54″N 001°46′16″E
HMS Gloucester	Royal Navy	1682	A third-rate ship that sank off Great Yarmouth.	
Hibernia	United Kingdom	9 November 1937	A spritsail that foundered off East Runton.	
Hopelyn	United Kingdom	17 October 1922	A merchant vessel that was stranded on the Scroby Sands.	52°37′N 01°47′E
HMS Invincible	Royal Navy	16 March 1801	A third-rate warship that struck rocks off Happisburgh.	
HMS Kent	Royal Navy	15 October 1672	A fourth-rate frigate that sank off Cromer.	
Meriones	United Kingdom	22 January 1941	A merchant vessel that was stranded on the wreck of the SS Monte Nevoso at Haisborough Sands, and then bombed by German aircraft.	52°51′N 01°45′E
Monte Nevoso	Italy	14 October 1932	A merchant vessel that ran aground on Haisborough Sands.	52°51′N 01°46′E
Mount Ida	Greece	9 October 1939	A merchant vessel that ran aground on Ower Bank.	53°10′44″N 1°55′46″E
Sea Queen	United Kingdom	13 February 1870	Wrecked on Scroby Sands.	
HMS Umpire	Royal Navy	19 July 1941	A U-class submarine that collided with the Peter Hendriks off Blakeney.	53°09′N 1°06′E
Gangeren	Norway	01 January 1913	Wrecked 10/01 on the North Pier, Gorleston Harbour (at the entrance to Great Yarmouth, England) whilst on a voyage from Bruges, Belgium to Great Yarmouth, England with paving stones..	52°34'22.6"N 1°44'23.0"E

=== Suffolk ===
Ship	Flag	Sunk date	Notes	Coordinates
Elbe	Germany	31 January 1895	A German liner sunk in the North Sea after colliding with the steamship Crathie.	
HMS Exmoor	Royal Navy	25 February 1941	A Hunt-class destroyer that was attacked by German E-boats and capsized off Lowestoft.	52°30′N 02°04′E
Gasfire	United Kingdom	21 June 1941	A steam collier that was sunk by a naval mine east of Southwold.	52.33°N 1.95°E
Golconda	United Kingdom	3 June 1916	A passenger ship that struck a mine and sank 5 nautical miles (9.3 km) southeast of Aldeburgh.	52°08′30″N 1°44′45″E
Harwich ferry	United Kingdom	18 April 1807	A ferry that capsized off Landguard Fort while overburdened with foot soldiers, women and children.	
Magdapur	United Kingdom	10 September 1939	A cargo ship that struck a naval mine off Thorpeness.	52°11′N 1°43′E
Phryné	France	24 September 1939	A cargo ship that was sunk by a naval mine off Aldeburgh.	52°09′N 1°43′E
U-13	Kriegsmarine	31 May 1940	A Type IIB U-boat that was sunk by HMS Weston 11 nautical miles (20 km) southeast of Lowestoft.	52°26′N 02°02′E

== East Midlands ==
=== Leicestershire ===
Ship	Flag	Sunk date	Notes	Coordinates
Stanegarth	United Kingdom	6 June 2000	A tug scuttled at Stoney Cove to create an artificial reef.	

== North East ==
=== County Durham ===
Ship	Flag	Sunk date	Notes	Coordinates
Seaton Carew Wreck	Unknown	Unknown	A protected wreck lying in the intertidal zone at Seaton Carew.	54°39′29″N 1°10′49″W

=== Northumberland ===
Ship	Flag	Sunk date	Notes	Coordinates
Abessinia	Germany	3 September 1921	A German steamer wrecked on the Farne Islands.	55°38.78′N 1°36.27′W
HMS Ascot	Royal Navy	10 November 1918	A Racecourse-class minesweeper that was torpedoed by UB-67 off the Farne Islands.	55°37′9.24″N 001°29′8.60″W
Coquet Mouth	United Kingdom	4 July 1940	Self-propelling bucket dredger which triggered a German magnetic mine.	55°20′N 1°33′W
Don	United Kingdom	8 May 1915	A cargo ship that was torpedoed by U-9 east of Coquet Island.	55°20′N 1°18′W
Forfarshire	United Kingdom	7 September 1838	A paddlesteamer that foundered on the Farne Islands.	55.63938°N 1.61911°W
HMS G11	Royal Navy	22 November 1918	A G-class submarine that ran aground near Howick.	55.452°N 1.589°W
UB-115	Imperial German Navy	29 September 1918	A Type UB III U-boat that was sunk by British forces off Newton-by-the-Sea.	55°14.460′N 1°22.454′W
HMS Unity	Royal Navy	29 April 1940	A U-class submarine that collided with Atle Jarl off Blyth.	55°13′N 1°19′W
Yewglen	United Kingdom	1960	Ran aground off Beadnell Point.	

=== Tyne and Wear ===
Ship	Flag	Sunk date	Notes	Coordinates
Hebble	United Kingdom	6 May 1917	A cargo ship that was sunk by mine east of Roker.	54°55′N 1°18′W
Oslofjord	Norway	1 December 1940	An ocean liner that hit a mine off South Shields.	55°0.17′N 1°23.72′W
UC-32	Imperial German Navy	23 February 1917	A German U-boat that struck its own naval mine at Sunderland.	

== North West ==
=== Lancashire ===
Ship	Flag	Sunk date	Notes	Coordinates
Abana	Norway	22 December 1894	A barque that was caught in a storm and ran aground at Bispham, Blackpool.	
Riverdance	Bahamas	31 January 2008	A roll-on/roll-off ferry that ran aground on Blackpool beach and was finally scrapped in place after refloating attempts failed.	53.873182°N 3.052444°W

=== Merseyside ===
Ship	Flag	Sunk date	Notes	Coordinates
Alarm	United Kingdom	1922	A lightship sunk in a collision in Liverpool Bay.	
Ionic Star	United Kingdom	1939	A Blue Star Line cargo ship that crashed on the mad wharf sandbank (a mile from Formby point) on a journey from Rio to Liverpool. Her cargo was salvaged and later used as target practice for the Royal Air Force.	53.5470396°N 3.1206322000000455°W
Pelican	Great Britain	20 March 1793	A privateer that sank in the River Mersey.	

== South East ==
=== East Sussex ===
Ship	Flag	Sunk date	Notes	Coordinates
RMS Alaunia	United Kingdom	19 October 1916	Struck a mine off Hastings.	
Amsterdam	Dutch East India Company	26 January 1749	A Dutch East India Company ship that ran aground near Hastings. The wreck site is protected.	50.846899°N 0.524281°E
HMS Ariadne	Royal Navy	26 July 1917	A Diadem-class cruiser torpedoed off Beachy Head by German submarine UC-65.	50.655°N 0.291°E
HMS Holland 5	Royal Navy	8 August 1912	A Holland-class submarine that foundered off Beachy Head while under tow to be scrapped.	50.729°N 0.248°E
RMS Moldavia	United Kingdom	23 May 1918	An armed merchantman torpedoed off Beachy Head by UB-57.	50°23.13′N 0°28.72′W
Nyon	Switzerland	15 June 1962	A Swiss cargo ship that ran aground at Berwickshire in 1958, but was salvaged and repaired. It sank for the final time off Beachy Head, following a collision.	
Sitakund	Norway	20 October 1968	A Norwegian motor tanker that exploded off the coast of Eastbourne.	50.719°N 0.240°E
Storaa	United Kingdom	3 November 1943	A British coaster sunk by a German torpedo near Hastings.	
U-40	Kriegsmarine	13 October 1939	A German submarine sunk by a mine off Eastbourne.	50°42′N 0°15′E
U-413	Kriegsmarine	20 August 1944	A German submarine sunk by a mine 15 nautical miles (28 km) south of Brighton.	50°21′N 00°01′W
UC-65	Imperial German Navy	3 November 1917	A German minelaying submarine torpedoed by HMS C15 off Eastbourne.	50°31′N 00°27′E
Wittering	United Kingdom	25 February 1976	A British cargo ship sunk after a collision, 11.5 nautical miles (21.3 km) off Beachy Head. Attended by the Hastings lifeboat.	50°43′N 00°37′W

=== Hampshire ===
Ship	Flag	Sunk date	Notes	Coordinates
Grace Dieu	England	1439	Henry V's flagship, struck by lightning in the River Hamble. Now a protected wrecksite. Wreck found in 1859.	50.891665°N 1.28848°W
Impétueux	French Navy	24 August 1794	A Téméraire-class ship of the line that took part in the Glorious First of June. It was captured by the British and accidentally destroyed in a fire at Portsmouth.	
HMS Invincible	Royal Navy	February 1758	A ship of the line that ran aground in the East Solent.	50°44′34″N 01°02′23″W
Mary Rose	Royal Navy	19 July 1545	A Tudor warship sunk in Portsmouth Harbour, possibly during an engagement with the French fleet. Now a protected wrecksite	50°47′59″N 1°06′24″W
HMS Newcastle	Royal Navy	27 November 1703	A fourth-rate frigate wrecked at Spithead in the Great Storm of 1703.	
HMS Royal George	Royal Navy	29 August 1782	A first-rate ship of the line that sank at anchor off Portsmouth, with the loss of over 800 lives.	

=== Isle of Wight ===
Ship	Flag	Sunk date	Notes	Coordinates
HMS Acheron	Royal Navy	17 December 1940	An A-class destroyer sunk by a mine off St. Catherine's Point.	50°32′N 1°26′W
HMCS Alberni	Royal Canadian Navy	21 August 1944	A Flower-class corvette sunk by U-480 off St. Catherine's Point.	50°18′N 0°51′W
Albert C. Field	Canada	18 June 1944	A Canadian ship sunk by a torpedo from a German aircraft off St. Catherine's Point.	50°28′N 01°45′W
HMS Assurance	Royal Navy	1753	A frigate wrecked off The Needles.	
HMS Boxer	Royal Navy	8 February 1918	An Ardent-class destroyer that collided with St Patrick off Culver Down.	50°36′08″N 01°06′02″W
Carbon	United Kingdom	1947	A steam-powered tugboat, sank and wrecked in Compton Bay; still visible at low tide.	
Eider	Germany	31 January 1892	A German ocean liner that ran aground on the Back of the Wight.	
HMS Hazard	Royal Navy	28 January 1918	A Dryad-class torpedo gunboat that collided with Western Australia off Seaview.	50°43′37″N 01°03′14″W
Irex	United Kingdom	25 January 1890	A sailing ship wrecked at Scratchell's Bay, near The Needles.	50.663°N 1.571°W
Leander	Germany	8 August 1940	A German coastal trading vessel captured by the Royal Navy, and bombed by German aircraft off St. Catherine's Point.	50°25′52″N 1°42′16″W
HMS Loyalty	Royal Navy	22 August 1944	An Algerine-class minesweeper sunk by U-480.	50°09′N 00°41′W
Mendi	Royal Navy	21 February 1917	A troopship rammed by Darro, with the loss of 646 lives.	50°28′0″N 1°33′0″W
Normandy	United Kingdom	17 March 1870	A mail steamer that collided with the steamship Mary near The Needles.	
SMS Nürnberg	Royal Navy	7 July 1922	A Königsberg-class that was scuttled in Scapa Flow in 1919, but was raised by Allied forces and ultimately sunk as a target.	
USS Osprey	United States Navy	5 June 1944	A Raven-class minesweeper sunk by a mine.	50°12′N 1°20′W
HMS Pomone	Royal Navy	14 October 1811	A Leda-class frigate that served in the Napoleonic Wars, and was wrecked off The Needles.	
Pool Fisher	United Kingdom	5 November 1979	A 1,028 GRT merchant vessel sank in heavy seas 6.6 nautical miles (12.2 km) SW from the Isle of Wight.	
HMS Scout	Royal Navy	25 March 1801	A French corvette captured by the British and renamed Scout. She was wrecked off The Needles.	
HMS Swordfish	Royal Navy	7 November 1940	An S-class submarine sunk when she struck a mine 12 nautical miles (22 km) S of St. Catherine's Point.	50°28′N 1°21′W
U-1195	Kriegsmarine	7 April 1945	A German submarine sunk by HMS Watchman.	50°33′22.26″N 0°56′17.81″W
U-480	Kriegsmarine	February 1945	A German submarine sunk by a mine.	50°22′4″N 1°44′10″W
UB-81	Imperial German Navy	2 December 1917	A German submarine that struck a mine and then collided with a patrol boat.	
Varvassi	Greece	5 January 1947	A Greek merchant steamship that ran aground off The Needles.	
HMS Velox	Royal Navy	25 October 1915	A torpedo boat destroyer that struck a mine and subsequently sank under tow about 1.5 nautical miles (2.8 km) east of Bembridge.	

=== Kent ===
Ship	Flag	Sunk date	Notes	Coordinates
HMS Amphion	Royal Navy	6 August 1914	An Active-class scout cruiser sunk by a mine laid by Königin Luise.	52.11°N 2.36°E
HMS Blackwater	Royal Navy	6 April 1909	A River-class destroyer that collided with Hero east of New Romney.	
HMS Brazen	Royal Navy	20 July 1940	A B-class destroyer sunk by German dive bomber aircraft off Folkestone.	51°01′05″N 01°17′15″E
HMS Bulwark	Royal Navy	26 November 1914	A Formidable-class battleship that exploded off Sheerness with the loss of 736 men.	51°25′N 0°39′E
HMS Codrington	Royal Navy	27 July 1940	An A-class destroyer bombed whilst in dock at Dover.	51°7′32″N 1°20′4″E
Deutschland	Germany	6 December 1875	A passenger steamship that ran aground on the Kentish Knock.	51°40′00″N 01°37′00″E
HMS Erin's Isle	Royal Navy	7 November 1919	A paddle steamer that was sunk by a mine north of Thanet.	51°33′N 1°19′E
HMS Ghurka	Royal Navy	8 February 1917	A Tribal-class destroyer that hit a mine off Dungeness.	50°51′20″N 0°53′17″E
SMS Grosser Kurfürst	Imperial German Navy	31 May 1878	A turret ship that collided with SMS König Wilhelm off Folkestone, resulting in 269 deaths.	
Hindostan	British East India Company	11 January 1803	An East Indiaman caught in a gale off Margate.	
Leicester	United Kingdom	12 February 1916	A cargo ship that struck a mine southeast of Folkestone.	51°04′N 1°15′E
Maloja	United Kingdom	27 February 1916	A passenger ship that was sunk by a mine off Folkestone.	51.05°N 01.19°E
HMS Niger	Royal Navy	11 November 1914	A minesweeper that was torpedoed by U-12 off Deal.	51.2206°N 1.4400°E
Northern Belle	United States	5 January 1857	An American transatlantic ship that ran aground off Thanet.	
Northfleet	Royal Navy	22 January 1873	A Blackwall frigate that was rammed by a steamer while at anchor off Dungeness, resulting in the loss of 293 lives.	
HMS Paragon	Royal Navy	17 March 1917	An Acasta-class destroyer in action against eight German torpedo boats was torpedoed in the Strait of Dover.	
Preußen	Germany	6 November 1910	A five-masted windjammer that was rammed by Brighton, and subsequently driven onto rocks off the coast of Dover.	51°8.02′N 1°22.17′E
The Queen	United Kingdom	26 October 1916	A steamship torpedoed by the German destroyer S60 off the Varne Bank.	50°54′N 1°19′E
RMS Royal Adelaide	United Kingdom	30 March 1850	A steamship wrecked at Tongue Sands off Margate.	
Unity	United Kingdom	2 May 1918	A cargo ship that was torpedoed by UB-57 about 9 nautical miles (17 km) southeast of Folkestone.	
U-12	Kriegsmarine	8 October 1939	A German submarine sunk by a mine off Dover.	51°10′N 01°30′E
UB-33	Imperial German Navy	11 April 1918	A German submarine that struck a mine off the Varne Bank.	
UB-55	Imperial German Navy	22 April 1918	A Type UB III U-boat that was sunk by a mine.	50°59′N 01°20′E
UB-56	Imperial German Navy	19 December 1917	A Type UB III U-boat that was sunk by a mine.	50°58′N 01°21′E
UB-58	Imperial German Navy	10 March 1918	A Type UB III U-boat that was sunk by a mine.	50°58′N 01°14′E
UC-50	Imperial German Navy	4 February 1918	A German minelaying submarine sunk by HMS Zubian off Dungeness.	
UC-64	Imperial German Navy	20 June 1918	A German minelaying submarine sunk by a mine off the Varne Bank.	50°58′N 01°23′W
HMS Venetia	Royal Navy	19 October 1940	A V-class destroyer that was sunk by a mine 12 nautical miles (22 km) northeast of Margate.	

==== Goodwin Sands ====
Ship	Flag	Sunk date	Notes	Coordinates
Admiral Gardner	East India Company	25 January 1809	A merchant vessel sunk in a storm.	
Cap Lopez	Belgium	21 December 1907	A cargo ship wrecked in heavy seas.	
HMT Etoile Polaire	Royal Navy	3 December 1915	A naval trawler destroyed by a mine laid by SM UC-1	
Ganges	United Kingdom	14 October 1881	A Nourse Line sailing ship wrecked en route from Middlesbrough to Calcutta.	
Guttenburg	Germany	1 January 1860	A German brig driven onto the South Sand Head by hurricane-force winds.	
Mahratta (1892)	United Kingdom	9 April 1909	A steamship that ran aground and broke in two.	51°14′45″N 01°30′05″E
Mahratta (1917)	United Kingdom	9 October 1939	A steamship that ran aground and broke in two.	51°14′45″N 01°30′05″E
Mary White	United Kingdom	6 March 1851	A brig that became stranded in rough weather. Its crew were rescued by a lifeboat which subsequently took the name Mary White.	
Montrose	United Kingdom	20 December 1914	A transatlantic ocean liner, upon which the murderer Hawley Crippen was arrested while attempting to flee to Canada. The ship was wrecked when she broke loose from her moorings during a gale.	
HMS Northumberland	Royal Navy	27 November 1703	A third-rate ship of the line wrecked in the Great Storm of 1703, with 220 deaths.	51°15′29″N 01°30′01″E
HMS Restoration	Royal Navy	27 November 1703	A third-rate ship of the line wrecked in the Great Storm of 1703, with 387 deaths.	51°15′42″N 01°30′3″E
Rooswijk	Dutch East India Company	19 December 1739	An East Indiaman that was wrecked in a heavy storm with the loss of all hands. The wreck was discovered in 2004.	51°16′27″N 01°34′32″E
HMS Stirling Castle	Royal Navy	27 November 1703	A third-rate ship of the line wrecked in the Great Storm of 1703.	51°16.4561′N 01°30.4121′E
U-16	Kriegsmarine	25 October 1939	A German submarine that ran aground while under attack from HMS Puffin and HMS Cayton Wyke.	51°9′N 1°28′E
UC-46	Imperial German Navy	8 February 1917	A German minelaying submarine sunk by HMS Liberty.	51°07′N 01°39′E
UC-63	Imperial German Navy	1 November 1917	A German minelaying submarine torpedoed by HMS E52.	51°23′N 02°00′E

=== River Thames ===
Ship	Flag	Sunk date	Notes	Coordinates
HMT Amethyst	Royal Navy	24 November 1940	A naval trawler sunk in the Thames Estuary.	51°30′28″N 1°01′15″E
The Blackfriar I	Unknown	2nd century (probable)	A small sailing ship discovered in Blackfriars along the banks of the Thames.	51.5109°N 0.1038°W
The Blackfriar II	Unknown	1660–1680 (probable)	A ship that was most likely carrying supplies to rebuild after the Great Fire of 1666.	
The Blackfriars III and IV	Unknown	15th century (Probable)	These ships collided with each other. The Blackfriar III is the most complete medieval sailing ship found in Great Britain.	
Boddington	United Kingdom	1805	A merchantman and convict ship that was stranded on a sandbank near Blackwall.	
HMS London	England	7 March 1665	A second-rate ship of the line that accidentally exploded in the Thames Estuary, killing 300 crewmen.	51.4966°N 0.7397°E
Marchioness	United Kingdom	20 August 1989	A pleasure boat and former little ship of Dunkirk that collided with the dredger Bowbelle near Cannon Street railway bridge, with 51 deaths.	
Princes Channel Wreck	Unknown	16th century (probable)	An Elizabethan wreck discovered in the Thames Estuary in 2004.	51.491075°N 1.111873°E
Princess Alice	United Kingdom	3 September 1873	A paddle steamer that collided with Bywell Castle near North Woolwich, with over 650 deaths.	51.51054°N 0.09015°E
Richard Montgomery	United States	20 August 1944	A Liberty ship that ran aground off the Nore in the Thames Estuary with over a thousand tons of explosives on board. A protected wreck site, designated as dangerous.	51°27′57″N 0°47′12″E
Stornoway	United Kingdom	7 June 1873	A clipper wrecked at the mouth of the Thames.	

=== Sussex ===
Ship	Flag	Sunk date	Notes	Coordinates
HMS A3	Royal Navy	2 February 1912	An A-class submarine sunk as a target of the Isle of Portland.	
RMS Alaunia	United Kingdom	19 October 1916	The vessel struck a mine off Hastings. The wreck site is protected.	52°22′21.00″N 4°54′51.48″E
HMS Ariadne	Royal Navy	26 July 1917	A Diadem-class cruiser torpedoed off Beachy Head by UC-65.	50.655°N 0.291°E
HMS Holland 5	Royal Navy	8 August 1912	A Holland-class submarine that foundered off Beachy Head while under tow to be scrapped.	50.729°N 0.248°E
RMS Moldavia	United Kingdom	23 May 1918	An armed merchantman torpedoed off Beachy Head by UB-57	50°23.13′N 0°28.72′W
Nyon	Switzerland	15 June 1962	A Swiss cargo ship that ran aground at Berwickshire in 1958, but was salvaged and repaired. It sank for the final time off Beachy Head, following a collision.	
Sitakund	Norway	20 October 1968	A Norwegian motor tanker that exploded off the coast of Eastbourne.	50.719°N 0.240°E
Storaa	United Kingdom	3 November 1943	A British coaster sunk by a German torpedo near Hastings.	
U-40	Kriegsmarine	13 October 1939	A German submarine sunk by a mine off Eastbourne.	50°42′N 0°15′E
U-413	Kriegsmarine	20 August 1944	A German submarine sunk by a mine 15 nautical miles (28 km; 17 mi) south of Brighton.	50°21′N 00°01′W
UC-65	Kriegsmarine	3 November 1917	A German minelaying submarine torpedoed by HMS C15 off Eastbourne.	50°31′N 00°27′E
Wittering	United Kingdom	25 February 1976	A British cargo ship sunk after a collision, 11.5 nautical miles (21.3 km; 13.2 mi) off Beachy Head. Attended by Hastings Lifeboat.	50°43′N 00°37′W

== South West ==
=== Bristol Channel ===
Ship	Flag	Sunk date	Notes	Coordinates
Bengrove	United Kingdom	7 March 1915	A collier torpedoed by German submarine U-20.	51.351°N 4.116°W
Fernwood	Royal Navy	18 September 1942	A collier struck by bombs off Dartmouth; towed to Woodspring Bay, near Weston, for trials and target practice . The Ministry of Defence base at St Thomas Head used the vessel for trials after the Second World War.	51.407°N 2.907°W
Nornen	Norway	3 March 1897	A three-masted barque sailing from Brunswick, Georgia, to Bristol, England. Forced ashore at Berrow beach, Somerset, by a storm. All crew and the ship's dog were rescued. The hull remains as a wreck on the beach to this day.	51.272°N 3.023°W
HMS Montagu	Royal Navy	29 May 1906	A battleship run aground in fog on Shutter Reef, Lundy.	
Staghound	Royal Navy	27 March 1942	A distilling ship bombed off Devon coast; salvaged and towed to Woodspring Bay for trials and target practice.	51.406°N 2.913°W
USCGC Tampa	United States Coast Guard	26 September 1918	A cutter that was torpedoed by German submarine UB-91.	50°40′N 6°19′W
HMS Vernon	Royal Navy	1944	Sunk off Weston-super-mare for target training and blockship trials.	51.406°N 2.905°W

=== Cornwall ===
Ship	Flag	Sunk date	Notes	Coordinates
HMS A7	Royal Navy	16 January 1914	An A-class submarine that sank in Whitsand Bay.	50°19′45″N 04°18′25″W
Adolf Vinnen	Germany	9 February 1923	A barquentine that was driven ashore at Bass Point.	49°57′53″N 5°11′00″W
HMS Anson	Royal Navy	29 December 1807	A third-rate ship of the line wrecked off Loe Bar.	
Antoinette	Canada	2 January 1895	A barque wrecked off Doom Bar.	
Ardgarry	United Kingdom	29 December 1962	Lost in a heavy storm off Lizard Point; 12 crew perished.	
Ben Asdale	United Kingdom	30 December 1978	A Scottish fishing trawler wrecked near Falmouth.	
Caledonia	United Kingdom	7 September 1842	A brig that was wrecked near Morwenstow.	50.905°N 4.569°W
Carl	Germany	7 October 1917	The sailing ship was impounded by British forces during the First World War and was suspected of being a minelayer. It was being towed to London when it ran aground on Booby's Bay.	
Corvus	Norway	27 February 1945	A steam merchant that was torpedoed by U-1018 off Lizard Point.	49°55′N 05°22′W
Eastfield	United Kingdom	27 November 1917	A steamship torpedoed by U-boat UB-57 off Mevagissey.	50°14.255′N 4°42.262′W
HMS Foyle	Royal Navy	15 March 1917	A River-class destroyer that struck a mine southeast of the Rame Peninsula.	50°16′N 04°10′W
Flying Enterprise	United States	10 January 1952	A steamship that sank after taking damage in a storm.	
Hanover	Kingdom of Great Britain	13 December 1763	A brigantine driven ashore near Perranporth.	
James Eagan Layne	United States	21 March 1945	A Liberty ship, situated in 22 metres (72 ft) of water in Whitsand Bay next to the wreck of HMS Scylla.	50°19.602′N 4°14.714′W
RFA Lady Cory-Wright	Royal Navy	26 March 1918	A cargo ship and mine carrier that was torpedoed by the German submarine UC-17 off The Lizard.	49°45′N 05°20′W
La Maudeleyne		1307	A Spanish cargo ship that was stranded on the south Cornish coast, possibly in Mount's Bay. All her crew were saved and much of the cargo was salvaged.	
Maria Asumpta	United Kingdom	30 May 1995	A brig that struck rocks at Rump Point.	50.594556°N 4.924389°W
Merchant Royal	England	23 September 1641	A merchant ship wrecked off Land's End in rough weather.	
Mohegan	United Kingdom	14 October 1898	The vessel wrecked on The Manacles.	
RMS Mulheim	Antigua and Barbuda	22 March 2003	A German cargo ship that ran ashore at Land's End. Five crew members were airlifted to safety.	50°04′35″N 5°42′45″W
HMS Primrose	Royal Navy	22 January 1809	A Cruizer-class brig-sloop that ran aground at The Manacles.	
HMCS Regina	Royal Canadian Navy	8 August 1944	A Flower-class corvette torpedoed by U-667 north of Trevose Head.	50°42′N 5°3′W
Rosehill	United Kingdom	23 September 1917	Torpedoed by UB-40 off Fowey.	50°19.793′N 4°18.520′W
S 89	Kriegsmarine	5 October 1946	A large S26-class torpedo boat (also called S-boat or E-boat). That ran aground in Tremoutha Haven after breaking free from being towed.	
HMS Scylla	Royal Navy	27 March 2004	A Type F71 frigate sunk to create an artificial reef for divers and marine life by the National Marine Aquarium.	50°19.655′N 4°15.162′W
St Anthony (aka Santo António)	Portugal	15 January 1527	A Portuguese carrack that foundered in Gunwalloe Bay.	50.050°N 5.287°W
Stanwood	United Kingdom	10 December 1939	A steamship that was scuttled after catching fire in the Carrick Roads.	
Torrey Canyon	Liberia	18 March 1967	A supertanker wrecked on Seven Stones reef.	50°2.50′N 6°7.73′W
HMCS Trentonian	Royal Canadian Navy	22 February 1945	A Flower-class corvette torpedoed by U-1004 near Falmouth.	50°06′N 04°50′W
U-650	Kriegsmarine	January 1945	A Type VIIC U-boat that was sunk by Allied forces southwest of Lizard Point.	49°51′6″N 5°29′9″W
U-1018	Kriegsmarine	27 February 1945	A Type VIIC/41 U-boat that was sunk by HMS Loch Fada in the English Channel.	49°56′N 05°20′W
U-1021	Kriegsmarine	14 March 1945	A Type VIIC/41 U-boat that was sunk by a mine 7 nautical miles (13 km) off Newquay.	50°33.3′N 5°11.6′W
U-1063	Kriegsmarine	15 April 1945	A German submarine sunk by HMS Loch Killin off Salcombe.	50°08′54″N 03°53′24″W
U-1199	Kriegsmarine	21 January 1945	A Type VIIC/41 U-boat that was sunk by HMS Icarus and HMS Mignonette south of Gwennap Head.	49°57′N 05°42′W
UB-65	Imperial German Navy	14 July 1918	A Type UB III U-boat that sunk for unknown reasons northwest of Doom Bar.	50.611°N 5.005°W
UC-66	Imperial German Navy	12 June 1917	A German minelaying submarine sunk by the armed trawler Sea King off Landewednack.	
Union Star	Ireland	19 December 1981	A mini-bulk carrier that ran aground near Mousehole. It caused the Penlee lifeboat disaster.	
Vigrid	Norway	31 December 1917	A Norwegian cargo ship torpedoed by U-95.	50°03′N 05°55′W
Volnay	Canada	December 1917	A Canadian cargo ship that struck a mine in Falmouth Bay.	
HMS Whiting	Royal Navy	15 September 1816	A Baltimore clipper that ran aground on the Doom Bar.	

=== Devon ===
Ship	Flag	Sunk date	Notes	Coordinates
HMS Amethyst	Royal Navy	15 February 1811	A frigate that served in the French Revolutionary Wars and the Napoleonic wars, eventually blown ashore at Mount Batten.	
HMS Amphion	Royal Navy	22 September 1796	A fifth-rate ship that exploded while undergoing repairs at Plymouth.	
Cattewater Wreck	Unknown	16th century (probable)	Wooden ship, first to be protected under Protection of Wrecks Act 1973.	50°21′43″N 4°07′42″W
HMT Elk	Royal Navy	27 November 1940	A former fishing trawler sunk by a mine off Plymouth.	50°17.800′N 4°10.600′W
HMS Empress of India	Royal Navy	4 November 1914	A battleship sunk as a target in Lyme Bay.	50°29′42″N 2°57′54″W
HMS Formidable	Royal Navy	1 January 1915	A Formidable-class battleship sunk off Start Point by the German submarine U-24.	50°13′N 3°04′W
HMS Foyle	Royal Navy	15 March 1917	A River-class destroyer that struck a mine in the Strait of Dover but sank while under tow to Plymouth	50°16.70′N 04°10.80′W
Glen Strathallen	United Kingdom	April 1970	A luxury yacht sunk as an underwater training facility near Fort Bovisand.	50°18.922′N 4°7.529′W
Hallowe'en	United Kingdom	1887	A clipper wrecked off Salcombe.	
Herzogin Cecilie	Finland	18 January 1939	A German-built barque that was beached at the Kingsbridge Estuary and later capsized.	50°12.82′N 3°47.02′W
Ice Prince	Greece	15 January 2008	A cargo ship that sank in the English Channel.	
London	Unknown	9 October 1796	Sank in Rapparee Cove, North Devon in stormy weather, while carrying prisoners and treasure from the Caribbean island of Saint Lucia.	
Louis Sheid	Belgium	7 December 1939	A Belgian steamer that ran aground near Thurlestone.	50°15.658′N 3°51.831′W
USS LST-493	United States Navy	12 April 1945	A tank landing ship run aground while attempting to enter Plymouth harbour.	
HMS M1	Royal Navy	12 November 1925	An M-class submarine that collided with the Vidar in the English Channel.	49°59′N 3°56′W
HMS M2	Royal Navy	26 January 1932	A British aircraft-carrying submarine shipwrecked in Lyme Bay.	50°34′34″N 2°32′55″W
Maine	United Kingdom	21 November 1917	A steamship torpedoed by UC-17 off Dartmouth.	50°12.750′N 3°50.955′W
Marguerite	France	28 June 1917	A French ship torpedoed by UB-40.	50°36′06″N 2°58′39″W
RMS Medina	United Kingdom	1 February 1917	A Royal Mail Ship torpedoed by UB-31 off Start Point.	
HMS Penylan	Royal Navy	3 December 1942	A Hunt-class destroyer sunk by E-boats off Start Point.	50°08′N 03°39′W
Persier	Belgium	11 February 1945	A cargo ship that was torpedoed by U-1017 off the Eddystone Rocks.	50°17′00″N 3°58′15″W
HMHS Rewa	United Kingdom	4 January 1918	A hospital ship torpedoed by German submarine U-55.	50°55′N 4°49′W
U-214	Kriegsmarine	26 July 1944	A Type VIID U-boat that was sunk by HMS Cooke southeast of Salcombe.	49°58′N 03°30′W
U-269	Kriegsmarine	25 June 1944	A German submarine sunk by HMS Bickerton off Torquay.	50°01′N 2°59′W
UC-49	Imperial German Navy	8 August 1918	A German minelaying submarine sunk by HMS Opossum off Start Point.	50°20′N 03°30′W
UC-51	Imperial German Navy	17 November 1917	A German minelaying submarine sunk by a mine off Salcombe.	50°08′N 03°42′W
HMS Victory	Royal Navy	4 October 1744	A first-rate ship of the line that was lost in a storm, and discovered in 2009 near Salcombe.	49°42.5′N 3°33.3′W

=== Dorset ===
Ship	Flag	Sunk date	Notes	Coordinates
HMS A1	Royal Navy	1911	An A-class submarine sunk off Bracklesham Bay.	50.7425°N 0.9213°W
Aeolian Sky	Greece	4 November 1979	A Greek freighter that collided with another ship near the Channel Islands, and sank off St Alban's Head.	50°30.55′N 2°8.33′W
HMS Empress of India	Royal Navy	4 November 1914	A battleship sunk as a target in Lyme Bay.	50°29.42′N 2°57.54′W
Alexander	East India Company	27 March 1815	An East Indiaman driven ashore in a storm at Wyke Regis.	
Athen	Germany	1911	A German merchant ship that collided with Thor off Portland Bill.	
Binnendijk	Netherlands	8 October 1939	A Dutch cargo ship that struck a mine and sank off Portland Bill.	
HMS Bittern	Royal Navy	4 April 1918	An Avon-class destroyer that collided with Kenilworth off the Isle of Portland.	
HMS Boadicea	Royal Navy	13 June 1944	A B-class destroyer sunk by aerial torpedoes dropped by Junkers Ju 88 dive bomber aircraft off the Isle of Portland.	50°28′12″N 02°29′30″W
HMS Delight	Royal Navy	29 July 1940	A D-class destroyer sunk by German dive bomber aircraft off the Isle of Portland.	50°34′25″N 2°26′1″W
Earl of Abergavenny	East India Company	5 February 1805	An East Indiaman sunk in Weymouth Bay	
HMS Foylebank	Royal Navy	5 July 1940	A merchant ship converted into an anti-aircraft ship, sunk by German Stuka aircraft off the Isle of Portland.	50°34′37″N 2°25′10″W
HMS Hood	Royal Navy	4 November 1914	A pre-dreadnought battleship sunk as a blockship in Portland Harbour.	50°34′09″N 2°25′16″W
HMS Invincible	Royal Navy	17 September 1914	An Audacious-class battleship that sank in a storm off Portland Bill.	
Kyarra	Australia	5 May 1918	A luxury liner sunk by the German submarine UB-57 near Swanage.	50°35′27″N 1°56′58″W
HMS L24	Royal Navy	10 January 1924	An L-class submarine that collided with HMS Resolution off Portland Bill.	50°22.50′N 02°37.79′W
USS LST-507	United States Navy	28 April 1944	A tank landing ship sunk by German E-boats off the Isle of Portland.	50°27.15′N 2°43.55′W
Radaas	Denmark	21 September 1917	A Danish steamship sunk by UB-40 off Portland Bill.	50°34′13″N 3°4′50″W
HMS Safari	Royal Navy	8 January 1946	An S-class submarine that sunk while under tow to be scrapped.	50°25′34″N 2°2′54″W
HMS Sidon	Royal Navy	14 June 1957	An S-class submarine that sunk in Portland Harbour on 16 June 1955 following an explosion. It was later raised and sunk as a target off Weymouth.	
Swash Channel Wreck	Netherlands	February 1631	The remains of the 17th-century armed merchantman Fame that ran aground and sank in February 1631 while anchored in Studland Bay during a storm outside Poole Harbour.	
The Mortar Wreck	England	1216–1272	The remains of a 13th-century clinker-built merchant ship in Studland Bay. It is the oldest shipwreck in English waters where the hull is still visible.	50°39′30.4″N 1°55′33.3″W
U-322	Kriegsmarine	19 December 1944	A Type VIIC U-boat that was sunk by HMCS Calgary south of Weymouth.	50°25′N 02°26′W
HMS Warrior	Royal Navy	11 July 1940	A steam yacht bombed off the Isle of Portland.	
The Pin Wreck	Royal Navy	11 September 1903	The remains of a 19th-century steam-powered Admiralty mooring lighter that sank in September 1903 while being towed during a storm off St Alban's Head near Swanage.	50°34′23″N 002°01′42″W
Fleur de Lys	United Kingdom	16 April 2000	A 54-foot wooden fishing trawler that suffered a hot water cylinder explosion and sank on 16 April 2000 inside Swanage Bay near Old Harry Rocks	50°37′29″N 001°55′43″W
Southampton	United Kingdom	2000s	A 59-foot tug boat that broke its moorings in a storm and sank on the western shore of Holes Bay, Poole Harbour, where it was left to decay.	50°43′20.24″N 1°59′26.70″W
Redhorn Quay Wreck	United Kingdom	15-16 October 1987	The remains of a 20th-century steel-hulled ship's lifeboat that was left to decay after either a failed post-WWII fishing club conversion or running aground during the Great Storm of 1987.	50.668983°N 1.970232°W

=== Isles of Scilly ===
Ship	Flag	Sunk date	Notes	Coordinates
HMS Association	Royal Navy	22 October 1707	A second rate ship of the line wrecked in the Scilly naval disaster of 1707, with about 800 dead.	
Cita	Antigua and Barbuda	26 March 1997	A merchant vessel that ran aground off St Mary's.	
HMS Colossus	Royal Navy	10 December 1798	A protected wreck site, broke anchor and ran aground off Samson.	
Dundee	United Kingdom	2 September 1917	A steam passenger and cargo ship sunk by German submarine UC-49	
HMS Eagle	Royal Navy	22 October 1707	A third-rate ship of the line wrecked in the Scilly naval disaster of 1707.	
Earl of Arran	United Kingdom	16 July 1872	A passenger ship that was wrecked off the Eastern Isles.	49°57′22.1″N 6°15′27.8″W
HMS Firebrand	Royal Navy	22 October 1707	A fireship wrecked in the Scilly naval disaster of 1707.	49°53′20″N 06°20′35″W
Hollandia	East India Company	13 July 1743	An East Indiaman wrecked off the island of Annet with 276 deaths.	
USS Jacob Jones	United States Navy	6 December 1917	A Tucker-class destroyer torpedoed by German submarine U-53	49°23′N 6°13′W
HMS K5	Royal Navy	20 January 1921	A K-class submarine that sank en route to a mock battle.	
Little Western	United Kingdom	6 October 1872	A passenger ship that was wrecked on a reef off Samson.	49.927°N 6.348°W
Minnehaha	United Kingdom	18 January 1874	A barque wrecked off Peninnis Head.	
Nancy	Kingdom of Great Britain	February 1784	A packet ship that ran aground on the Western Rocks.	
Rachel Harvey	United Kingdom	1 October 1999	A fishing vessel that struck rocks off Peninnis Head.	
HMS Romney	Royal Navy	26 October 1707	A fourth-rate ship of the line wrecked in the Scilly naval disaster of 1707.	
Schiller	Germany	7 May 1875	A German ocean liner wrecked on the Retarrier Ledges, with 335 deaths.	
Thames	United Kingdom	4 January 1841	An Irish steamship that ran aground on Cribewidden Rock.	
Thomas W. Lawson	United States	14 December 1907	An American schooner wrecked off the island of Annet, spilling 58,000 barrels of kerosene.	49°53′38″N 06°22′55″W
UC-19	Imperial German Navy	6 December 1916	A German minelaying submarine sunk by HMS Ariel	49°41′N 06°31′W
Wheel Wreck	Unknown	Unknown	An unidentified shipwreck located off Little Ganinick, believed to date from around 1835.	49.945°N 6.276°W

== Yorkshire and the Humber ==
Ship	Flag	Sunk date	Notes	Coordinates
Empire Bay	United Kingdom	15 January 1942	A collier that was bombed by German aircraft off Middlesbrough.	54°41′08″N 1°08′36″W
HMS Falmouth	Royal Navy	19 August 1916	A Town-class cruiser sunk by U-63 off Hornsea.	53°58.93′N 0°4.50′W
Lanthorn	United Kingdom	21 May 1917	A cargo ship that was sunk by UB-41 off Whitby.	54°30′N 00°29′W
Piłsudski	Poland	26 November 1939	A Polish ocean liner sunk off Grimsby.	53°45.75′N 0°45.67′E
Rohilla	United Kingdom	30 October 1914	A steamship that struck a reef near Whitby.	
Saint Ninian	United Kingdom	7 February 1917	A cargo ship that was torpedoed by UB-48 off Whitby.	54°28′46.1″N 0°28′10.3″W
