= List of shipwrecks in 1968 =

The list of shipwrecks in 1968 includes ships sunk, foundered, grounded, or otherwise lost during 1968.

table of contents
1968
| Jan | Feb | Mar | Apr |
| May | Jun | Jul | Aug |
| Sep | Oct | Nov | Dec |
Unknown date

== January ==
=== 1 January ===
List of shipwrecks: 1 January 1968
| Ship | State | Description |
|---|---|---|
| Attu | United States | The motor vessel was destroyed by fire on the beach at Skagway, Alaska. |
| Denver | United States | The motor vessel was destroyed by fire at Juneau, Alaska. |
| Seattle | United States | The 1,357-ton barge was destroyed by fire at Ugashik, Alaska. |

=== 3 January ===
List of shipwrecks: 3 January 1968
| Ship | State | Description |
|---|---|---|
| Ioannis K | Greece | The Liberty ship was wrecked at Vung Tau, Vietnam (10°19′23″N 107°05′11″E). She was on a voyage from Saigon to Singapore. |
| Schiedyk | Netherlands | The freighter sank off Bligh Island, Nootka Sound, Canada after hitting a submerged rock. She began leaking oil fuel in 2020. |

=== 5 January ===
List of shipwrecks: 5 January 1968
| Ship | State | Description |
|---|---|---|
| Pochteca | Liberia | The molten sulphur carrier, a converted T2 tanker, suffered an explosion in one of her sulphur vats whilst on a voyage from Coatzacoalcos, Mexico to Tampa, Florida. She completed her voyage, but was consequently scrapped. |

=== 7 January ===
List of shipwrecks: 7 January 1968
| Ship | State | Description |
|---|---|---|
| USS Abercrombie | United States Navy | The decommissioned John C. Butler-class destroyer escort was sunk as a target in the Pacific Ocean off San Diego, California, by the ships and aircraft of the USS Bon Homme Richard carrier battle group (United States Navy). |

=== 9 January ===
List of shipwrecks: 9 January 1968
| Ship | State | Description |
|---|---|---|
| USCGC Coos Bay | United States Coast Guard | Coos Bay sinking. The decommissioned Casco-class cutter was sunk as a target in the Atlantic Ocean 120 nautical miles (220 km; 140 mi) off the coast of Virginia by the guided-missile destroyer USS Claude V. Ricketts (United States Navy), one other U.S. Navy ship, and 35 aircraft. |

=== 11 January ===
List of shipwrecks: 11 January 1968
| Ship | State | Description |
|---|---|---|
| St Romanus | United Kingdom | The trawler issued a mayday on this date which was heard but not responded to. Lost with all twenty crew. |
| Unidentified fishing vessel | South Korea | The fishing vessel was shelled and sunk by North Korean ships. |

=== 13 January ===
List of shipwrecks: 13 January 1968
| Ship | State | Description |
|---|---|---|
| Saxona | Canada | The steamer sank in the Atlantic Ocean (39°42′N 30°36′W) while being towed to Italy for scrapping. |

=== 14 January ===
List of shipwrecks: 14 January 1968
| Ship | State | Description |
|---|---|---|
| Bristol Queen | United Kingdom | The paddle steamer was run into by the tanker Geodor (Liberia) at Cardiff, Glamorgan. She was severely damaged and was consequently scrapped. |

=== 15 January ===
List of shipwrecks: 15 January 1968
| Ship | State | Description |
|---|---|---|
| Cessnock | United Kingdom | The dredger capsized and sank in the River Clyde during a storm. Three crew were killed. |

=== 16 January ===
List of shipwrecks: 16 January 1968
| Ship | State | Description |
|---|---|---|
| Balkan | Bulgaria | The cargo ship ran aground at Lattakia, Syria. She was on a voyage from Bourgas to Lattakia. She was refloated on 24 July but was consequently scrapped. |

=== 18 January ===
List of shipwrecks: 18 January 1968
| Ship | State | Description |
|---|---|---|
| Little Joe | United States | The motor vessel was destroyed by fire in Seal Bay on the coast of Alaska. The wreck report did not specify in which of many Seal Bays along the Alaskan coast the incident took place. |

=== 22 January ===
List of shipwrecks: 22 January 1968
| Ship | State | Description |
|---|---|---|
| Elpis | Greece | The coaster sank between Ameland and Schiermonnikoog, Netherlands. She was on a voyage from London, United Kingdom to Hamburg, West Germany. |

=== 23 January ===
List of shipwrecks: 23 January 1968
| Ship | State | Description |
|---|---|---|
| INS Dakar | Israeli Navy | The Leviathan-class submarine disappeared in the eastern Mediterranean Sea on her delivery voyage to Israel. Claims that Assyout ( United Arab Republic Navy) sank her with depth charges are disputed by Israel. |

=== 26 January ===
List of shipwrecks: 26 January 1968
| Ship | State | Description |
|---|---|---|
| Kingston Peridot | United Kingdom | The trawler was last reported off Iceland on this date, lost with all twenty crew. |

=== 27 January ===
List of shipwrecks: 27 January 1968
| Ship | State | Description |
|---|---|---|
| Minerve | French Navy | The Daphné-class submarine sank in the Mediterranean Sea about 25 nautical miles (46 km; 29 mi) from Toulon, France, with the loss of her entire crew of 52. Wreck found 2019. |

== February ==
=== 4 February ===
List of shipwrecks: 4 February 1968
| Ship | State | Description |
|---|---|---|
| Boston Typhoon | United Kingdom | The 139.82-foot (42.62 m) fishing vessel stranded at the entrance to Isafjordur, Iceland. Refloated 2 days later. |
| Ross Cleveland | United Kingdom | The trawler capsized and sank off Isafjordur, Iceland with the loss of eighteen of her nineteen crew. |

=== 5 February ===
List of shipwrecks: 5 February 1968
| Ship | State | Description |
|---|---|---|
| Pacific Fir | Hong Kong | The cargo ship sprang a leak in the South China Sea 75 nautical miles (139 km; 86 mi) east of Tai Tung, Taiwan. (22°37′N 121°42′E) and was abandoned. Beached at Koto Soh but broke in two, a total loss. |

=== 6 February ===
List of shipwrecks: 6 February 1968
| Ship | State | Description |
|---|---|---|
| USS Bache | United States Navy | USS Bache aground. The Fletcher-class destroyer was blown ashore by a gale outside the harbor at Rhodes in the Aegean Sea during a three-day port call there. Deemed a constructive total loss, she was decommissioned and scrapped in situ. |

=== 10 February ===
List of shipwrecks: 10 February 1968
| Ship | State | Description |
|---|---|---|
| Charny | Canada | Charny began taking on water in one hold during a storm while on a voyage from Canada to Haiti. The vessel sank but all 24 people on board were rescued. |

=== 11 February ===
List of shipwrecks: 11 February 1968
| Ship | State | Description |
|---|---|---|
| Fairwind | Liberia | The Victory ship ran aground off Grand Bahama, Bahamas (27°16′N 77°16′W). She was on a voyage from a West African port to New Orleans, Louisiana. She was refloated on 24 February and towed to Jacksonville, Florida, where she was declared a constructive total loss. She was consequently scrapped. |

=== 13 February ===
List of shipwrecks: 13 February 1968
| Ship | State | Description |
|---|---|---|
| Spyridon | Greece | Spyridon sinking A fire erupted aboard the cargo ship in the Mediterranean Sea. She sank in the late afternoon. The U.S. Navy ammunition ship USS Suribachi received an SOS call at 0916 hrs and arrived on scene at 1555 hrs. Three Greek merchant ships and a Soviet Kashin-class guided missile destroyer also responded to the call. The crew was rescued by the Greek ships. |

=== 16 February ===
List of shipwrecks: 16 February 1968
| Ship | State | Description |
|---|---|---|
| Delfini | Panama | The Liberty ship was driven ashore near Osaka, Japan. |

=== 18 February ===
List of shipwrecks: 18 February 1968
| Ship | State | Description |
|---|---|---|
| Mount Hope | United States | After entering shallow water in Narragansett Bay off the coast of Rhode Island during a storm, the 118-foot (36 m), 156-gross register ton tug struck an unidentified object and sank quickly in 20 feet (6.1 m) of water just south of Hope Island at 41°35.53′N 071°22.79′W without loss of life. |

=== 19 February ===
List of shipwrecks: 19 February 1968
| Ship | State | Description |
|---|---|---|
| Capitaine Frangos | Panama | The cargo ship sank after colliding with an unidentified ship at the entrance to the Dardanelles, Turkey. Fifteen of her twenty crew were killed. |

=== 20 February ===
List of shipwrecks: 20 February 1968
| Ship | State | Description |
|---|---|---|
| USS Saufley | United States Navy | The decommissioned Fletcher-class destroyer was sunk as a target off Key West, Florida. |

=== 22 February ===
List of shipwrecks: 22 February 1968
| Ship | State | Description |
|---|---|---|
| Parvati Jayanti | India | The Liberty ship ran aground near Casablanca, Morocco. She was later refloated but declared a constructive total loss and scrapped. |

=== 25 February ===
List of shipwrecks: 25 February 1968
| Ship | State | Description |
|---|---|---|
| British Crusader | United Kingdom | The tanker ran aground in the Panama Canal, blocking it. |

=== 26 February ===
List of shipwrecks: 26 February 1968
| Ship | State | Description |
|---|---|---|
| Shozan Maru | Japan | The bulk carrier struck a rock in the Panama Canal and sank. Refloated the following day. |

=== 27 February ===
List of shipwrecks: 27 February 1968
| Ship | State | Description |
|---|---|---|
| Archon Raphael | Panama | The Liberty ship sank near Djibouti City. |

=== 29 February ===
List of shipwrecks: 29 February 1968
| Ship | State | Description |
|---|---|---|
| Chirikof | United States | The crab-fishing vessel sank off Alaska′s Kodiak Island. Her crew of three abandoned ship in a skiff without oars. The cargo ship Chena (United States) found them adrift on 1 March, but they were too weak from hypothermia to climb her Jacob's ladder. Subsequently the medium endurance cutter USCGC Confidence ( United States Coast Guard) arrived on the scene and rescued them. |

== March ==
=== 1 March ===
List of shipwrecks: 1 March 1968
| Ship | State | Description |
|---|---|---|
| USS Bayonne | United States Navy | The decommissioned Tacoma-class patrol frigate was sunk as a target. |
| C-165 | Vietnam People's Navy | Vietnam War: Tet Offensive: The blockade-running naval trawler was sunk off South Vietnam when her cargo exploded when the high endurance cutter USCGC Winona ( United States Coast Guard) hit her with gunfire. |
| C-235 | Vietnam People's Navy | Vietnam War: Tet Offensive: The blockade-running naval trawler was sunk off South Vietnam when her cargo exploded when the patrol craft fast USS PCF-14 (United States Navy) hit her with gunire, or was blown up by a scuttling charge. Her commanding officer and one other member of her crew later were killed by South Vietnamese troops in a firefight ashore. |
| C-43B | Vietnam People's Navy | Vietnam War: Tet Offensive: The blockade-running naval trawler was beached after being shelled by U.S. ships, then scuttled with demolition charges. Three members of her crew were killed and her commanding officer and executive officer were wounded. |

=== 3 March ===
List of shipwrecks: 3 March 1968
| Ship | State | Description |
|---|---|---|
| Ocean Eagle | Liberia | USS Preserver with the sunken Ocean Eagle off Puerto Rico, 1968. The tanker ran aground at San Juan, Puerto Rico. Later broke in two, a total loss. |

=== 6 March ===
List of shipwrecks: 6 March 1968
| Ship | State | Description |
|---|---|---|
| Antonios Michalos | Greece | The cargo ship struck a submerged object at Brăila, Romania and ran aground. Refloated but declared a constructive total loss and scrapped in May 1969. |
| Nomadisch | Netherlands | Nomadisch The coaster was driven ashore at Knokke, West Flanders, Belgium. |

=== 8 March ===
List of shipwrecks: 8 March 1968
| Ship | State | Description |
|---|---|---|
| K-129 | Soviet Navy | The Golf II-class ballistic missile submarine sank in the Pacific Ocean 90 nautical miles (170 km; 100 mi) southwest of Hawaii with the loss of all 98 crew members. |

=== 9 March ===
List of shipwrecks: 9 March 1968
| Ship | State | Description |
|---|---|---|
| Universal Trader | Liberia | The Liberty ship ran aground on the coast of Ceylon (6°24′N 81°47′E), caught fire and was abandoned. She broke in two on 18 March, a total loss. |

=== 10 March ===
List of shipwrecks: 10 March 1968
| Ship | State | Description |
|---|---|---|
| Hi Krooyer | Denmark | The coaster sank 10 nautical miles (19 km; 12 mi) south of Sule Skerry, Orkney Islands following and on-board explosion. One of her five crew was killed. |

=== 14 March ===
List of shipwrecks: 14 March 1968
| Ship | State | Description |
|---|---|---|
| Four unidentified naval trawlers | Vietnam People's Navy | Vietnam War: Tet Offensive: The blockade-running naval trawlers were sunk by U.S. aircraft off the coast of South Vietnam. |
| Unidentified naval trawler | Vietnam People's Navy | Vietnam War: Tet Offensive: The blockade-running naval trawler sunk by gunfire off the coast of South Vietnam by the cutter USCGC Point Ellis ( United States Coast Guard) and the radar picket escort vessel USS Brister and patrol craft fast USS PCF-78 (both United States Navy). |
| Four unidentified naval trawlers | Vietnam People's Navy | Vietnam War: Tet Offensive: The blockade-running naval trawlers were beached at Trieu Phong, South Vietnam, to facilitate unloading and then scuttled. |
| Three unidentified naval trawlers | Vietnam People's Navy | Vietnam War: Tet Offensive: The blockade-running naval trawlers were beached at Gio Linh, South Vietnam, to facilitate unloading and then scuttled. |

=== 20 March ===
List of shipwrecks: 20 March 1968
| Ship | State | Description |
|---|---|---|
| Elisabethville | Belgium | Caught fire at Antwerp, declared a constructive total loss. Scrapped in January 1969. |

=== 23 March ===
List of shipwrecks: 23 March 1968
| Ship | State | Description |
|---|---|---|
| Akutan | United States | The motor vessel was wrecked at Kodiak, Alaska. |

=== 29 March ===
List of shipwrecks: 29 March 1968
| Ship | State | Description |
|---|---|---|
| Jupiter | Liberia | The Liberty ship ran aground at Cabo San Lázaro, Mexico (24°47′N 112°19′W) and was abandoned. |

== April ==
=== 7 April ===
List of shipwrecks: 7 April 1968
| Ship | State | Description |
|---|---|---|
| Capitàn Leonidas | Chile | Wreck of Capitàn Leonidas in 1989 The ship was deliberately grounded in Messier Channel, Chile, on 7 April 1968 while on a voyage from Santos to Valparaíso with sugar. The captain wanted to sink the ship for an insurance fraud. However, the ship was only grounded. It was originally the Norwegian-flagged MV Molda, built in Bremen, Germany in 1937. |

=== 9 April ===
List of shipwrecks: 9 April 1968
| Ship | State | Description |
|---|---|---|
| Belgion | Greece | The cargo ship ran aground off Tripoli, Libya. She was on a voyage from Antwerp, Belgium to Lattakia. She was refloated but declared a constructive total loss and consequently scrapped. |

=== 10 April ===
List of shipwrecks: 10 April 1968
| Ship | State | Description |
|---|---|---|
| Wahine | New Zealand | Salvage of TEV Wahine The New Zealand inter-island ro-ro ferry of the Union Company, foundered on Barrett Reef at the entrance to Wellington Harbour and capsized near Steeple Rock. Of the 610 passengers and 123 crew on board, 53 were killed. |

=== 12 April ===
List of shipwrecks: 12 April 1968
| Ship | State | Description |
|---|---|---|
| M P E 110 | United States | The motor vessel sank off Cook Inlet on the south-central coast of Alaska. |

=== 21 April ===
List of shipwrecks: 21 April 1968
| Ship | State | Description |
|---|---|---|
| Lambda 72 | Cuba | The fishing vessel was sunk by a Cuban-exile-operated speedboat. |
| Lambda 100 | Cuba | The fishing vessel was sunk by a Cuban-exile-operated speedboat. |

=== 22 April ===
List of shipwrecks: 22 April 1968
| Ship | State | Description |
|---|---|---|
| Alhelli | Lebanon | The Liberty ship sprang a leak and was abandoned in the Atlantic Ocean. She sank on 24 April at 33°15′N 45°50′W. |

=== 30 April ===
List of shipwrecks: 30 April 1968
| Ship | State | Description |
|---|---|---|
| Brandaris | Netherlands | The coaster sank in the Bay of Biscay 80 nautical miles (150 km) west of the mouth of the Gironde. All crew rescued by a Spanish trawler. |

=== Unknown date ===
List of shipwrecks: Unknown date April 1968
| Ship | State | Description |
|---|---|---|
| USS Motive | United States Navy | The decommissioned Auk-class minesweeper was sunk as a target in the Pacific Ocean by elements of the United States Pacific Fleet. |

== May ==
=== 6 May ===
List of shipwrecks: 6 May 1968
| Ship | State | Description |
|---|---|---|
| Cutral Co | Argentina | The tanker burned and sank at Ensenada, Argentina, after burning oil from the tanker Islas Orcadas (Argentina) spread to her and set her on fire. |
| Fray Luis Beltran | Argentina | The tanker burned and sank at Ensenada, Argentina, after burning oil from the tanker Islas Orcadas (Argentina) spread to her and set her on fire. |
| Islas Orcadas | Argentina | The tanker suffered an explosion, caught fire, and sank at Ensenada, Argentina. |

=== 8 May ===
List of shipwrecks: 10 May 1968
| Ship | State | Description |
|---|---|---|
| Inverrosa | United Kingdom | The ore carrier ran aground off Boca Ralon, Florida, United States. She was refloated on 23 May, subsequently laid up and scrapped. Inverrosa shipwreck, Boca Raton, Florida (May 1968) Inverrosa shipwreck, Boca Raton, Florida (May 1968) |

=== 10 May ===
List of shipwrecks: 10 May 1968
| Ship | State | Description |
|---|---|---|
| Gero Miklaos | Greece | The cargo ship ran aground in a cyclone at Akyab, Burma and broke up, a total loss. |

=== 17 May ===
List of shipwrecks: 17 May 1968
| Ship | State | Description |
|---|---|---|
| Alert | United States | The motor vessel was wrecked at Point Couverden (58°11′25″N 135°03′10″W) in Southeast Alaska. |

=== 21 May ===
List of shipwrecks: Unknown date May 1968
| Ship | State | Description |
|---|---|---|
| USS Scorpion | United States Navy | Bow section of Scorpion on the ocean bottom, photographed by the bathyscaphe Trieste II. The Skipjack-class submarine sank in the Atlantic Ocean about 400 nautical miles (740 km; 460 mi) southwest of the Azores on or after this date with the loss of her entire crew of 99. |

== June ==
=== 3 June ===
List of shipwrecks: 3 June 1968
| Ship | State | Description |
|---|---|---|
| Kostis | Greece | The Liberty ship ran aground south of Dakar, Senegal 11°18′N 16°48′W, a total loss. |

=== 14 June ===
List of shipwrecks: 14 June 1968
| Ship | State | Description |
|---|---|---|
| World Glory | Greece | The tanker broke in two off the coast of Natal in a storm. Both sections sank. |

=== 17 June ===
List of shipwrecks: 17 June 1968
| Ship | State | Description |
|---|---|---|
| Pan 60 | United States | The gillnet fishing vessel was destroyed near the False Pass entrance to the Bering Sea by a fire in her galley that went out of control. The only person aboard barely survived by jumping overboard just before a 300-US-gallon (1,100 L; 250 imp gal) gasoline tank exploded and swimming 1 nautical mile (1.9 km; 1.2 mi) to shore in heavy clothing and rubber boots. |

=== 29 June ===
List of shipwrecks: 29 June 1968
| Ship | State | Description |
|---|---|---|
| John D | United States | The motor vessel was destroyed by fire near the small-boat harbor in Homer, Alaska. |

=== 30 June ===
List of shipwrecks: 30 June 1968
| Ship | State | Description |
|---|---|---|
| Riachuelo | Brazilian Navy | The decommissioned Gato-class submarine was sunk as a target on or about this date. |

== July ==
=== 1 July ===
List of shipwrecks: 1 July 1968
| Ship | State | Description |
|---|---|---|
| James B. Richardson | United States | The Liberty ship was scuttled off the coast of New Jersey (approximately 39°30′N 71°00′W) with a cargo of obsolete ammunition. |

=== 5 July ===
List of shipwrecks: 5 July 1968
| Ship | State | Description |
|---|---|---|
| Southern Exposure | United States | The motor vessel was destroyed by fire in the Gulf of Alaska 190 nautical miles (350 km; 220 mi) miles east of Cape Chiniak (57°37′N 152°10′W) on Kodiak Island. |

=== 9 July ===
List of shipwrecks: 9 July 1968
| Ship | State | Description |
|---|---|---|
| Humaitá | Brazilian Navy | The decommissioned Gato-class submarine was sunk as a target in the Atlantic Ocean off Long Island, New York, United States by United States Navy vessels. |

=== 17 July ===
List of shipwrecks: 17 July 1968
| Ship | State | Description |
|---|---|---|
| Serigi | Brazil | The 190.9-foot (58.2 m), 750-ton cargo vessel struck a rock was wrecked 7 miles (11 km) off the Canary Islands. She was refloated on unknown date, but wrecked again in heavy weather and abandoned. |

=== 19 July ===
List of shipwrecks: 19 July 1968
| Ship | State | Description |
|---|---|---|
| Magsaysay | Philippines | The cargo ship caught fire in the South China Sea off South Korea and was abandoned. She was on a voyage from the Philippines to Inchon, South Korea. Magsaysay was later reboarded. Shetowed into Pusan but was declared a constructive total loss and consequently scrapped. |

=== 23 July ===
List of shipwrecks: 23 July 1968
| Ship | State | Description |
|---|---|---|
| USCGC Mackinac | United States Coast Guard | The decommissioned Casco-class cutter was sunk as a target in the Atlantic Ocean at 36°22′00″N 073°09′00″W by the heavy cruiser USS Newport News, the guided-missile light cruiser USS Springfield, the guided-missile frigate USS King, and the destroyer USS New (all United States Navy). |

== August ==
=== 3 August ===
List of shipwrecks: 3 August 1968
| Ship | State | Description |
|---|---|---|
| B B 6 | United States | The 7-ton gasoline-powered screw fishing vessel was destroyed by fire at the Alitak Cannery at Akhiok (also known as Alitak), Alaska. |
| Lula II | United States | The motor vessel was destroyed by fire at the Alitak Cannery at Akhiok, Alaska. |

=== 5 August ===
List of shipwrecks: 5 August 1968
| Ship | State | Description |
|---|---|---|
| Walworth | United States | The motor vessel was destroyed by fire off Sumner Strait in the Alexander Archipelago in Southeast Alaska. |

=== 9 August ===
List of shipwrecks: 9 August 1968
| Ship | State | Description |
|---|---|---|
| Sealady | United States | The bulk carrier was holed by USS Von Steuben (United States Navy) in the Atlantic Ocean (36°34′N 6°16′W). She was beached in Cádiz Bay and abandoned. |

=== 13 August ===
List of shipwrecks: 13 August 1968
| Ship | State | Description |
|---|---|---|
| Lila Ki | United States | The motor vessel was destroyed by fire at Twin Points (57°54′45″N 133°59′30″W) in Stephens Passage in the Alexander Archipelago in Southeast Alaska. |

=== 14 August ===
List of shipwrecks: 14 August 1968
| Ship | State | Description |
|---|---|---|
| USS Devilfish | United States Navy | The sinking of Devilfish. The decommissioned Balao-class submarine was sunk as a target by a Mark 16 MOD 8 torpedo fired by the submarine USS Wahoo (United States Navy) in the Pacific Ocean off San Francisco, California, at 37°05′N 124°08′W. |

=== 16 August ===
List of shipwrecks: 16 August 1968
| Ship | State | Description |
|---|---|---|
| Brownie | United States | The motor vessel was destroyed by fire in Tonki Bay (58°20′N 152°04′W) on the coast of Afognak Island in Alaska′s Kodiak Archipelago. |

=== 17 August ===
List of shipwrecks: 17 August 1968
| Ship | State | Description |
|---|---|---|
| USS Traw | United States Navy | The decommissioned John C. Butler-class destroyer escort was sunk as a gunnery target off Baja California, Mexico, by the destroyer USS Bausell (United States Navy). |

=== 20 August ===
List of shipwrecks: 20 August 1968
| Ship | State | Description |
|---|---|---|
| Whistler | United States | A tsunami destroyed the motor vessel off of Kokinhenik Bar on the Copper River Delta in Alaska. |

=== 21 August ===
List of shipwrecks: 21 August 1965
| Ship | State | Description |
|---|---|---|
| Captain G. | Panama | The Liberty ship foundered in a typhoon 60 nautical miles (110 km) south of Hong Kong (22°24′N 114°55′E). She was on a voyage from Kosseir to Shanghai, China. |

=== 22 August ===
List of shipwrecks: 22 August 1965
| Ship | State | Description |
|---|---|---|
| Amaryllis | Panama | The cargo ship, refloated after running aground in September 1965, is scuttled 0.75 miles (1.21 km) off Riviera Beach, Florida, to form an artificial reef. |

=== 23 August ===
List of shipwrecks: 23 August 1968
| Ship | State | Description |
|---|---|---|
| Southern Foster | United Kingdom | The 438 GRT steam-powered whaler foundered and was lost off South Georgia Island in the South Atlantic Ocean. |

=== 27 August ===
List of shipwrecks: 27 August 1968
| Ship | State | Description |
|---|---|---|
| Plover | United States | The motor vessel was wrecked off Point Stanhope Island (56°00′50″N 132°36′10″W) off the west coast of Etolin Island in the Alexander Archipelago in Southeast Alaska. |

=== 31 August ===
List of shipwrecks: 31 August 1968
| Ship | State | Description |
|---|---|---|
| Willi Bansch | Volksmarine | The 183/1 (Project 183)-class motor torpedo boat was sunk in a collision in heavy fog with Drottingen (Sweden). Seven crewmen killed. |

=== Unknown date ===
List of shipwrecks: Unknown date August 1968
| Ship | State | Description |
|---|---|---|
| USS Condor | United States Navy | The decommissioned YMS-1-class minesweeper of the YMS-135 subclass was sunk as a target. |

== September ==
=== 1 September ===
List of shipwrecks: 1 September 1968
| Ship | State | Description |
|---|---|---|
| Cabo Santa Maria | Spain | The cargo ship ran aground at Praia de Atalanta, Cape Verde and was wrecked. |
| Peter Pan | United States | The motor vessel was lost off Kodiak Island, Alaska. |

=== 5 September ===
List of shipwrecks: 5 September 1968
| Ship | State | Description |
|---|---|---|
| Atlantic | United States | The motor vessel was destroyed by fire at Cape Spencer in Southeast Alaska. |

=== 8 September ===
List of shipwrecks: 8 September 1968
| Ship | State | Description |
|---|---|---|
| Isabella Baldwin | United Kingdom | The survey ship struck a wreck in Da Nang harbour, South Vietnam, and sank. All 12 crew members were rescued by a United States Navy vessel. |

=== 9 September ===
List of shipwrecks: 9 September 1968
| Ship | State | Description |
|---|---|---|
| Ruthy Ann | United Kingdom | The cargo ship collided with Cuu Long (South Vietnam) in a typhoon at Haiphong, North Vietnam and then ran aground. She was refloated on 30 September and found to be severely damaged. Subsequently repaired and returned to service. |

=== 10 September ===
List of shipwrecks: 10 September 1968
| Ship | State | Description |
|---|---|---|
| Helen J | United States | The motor vessel sank on the south-central coast of Alaska near Icy Bay, northwest of Yakutat. |

=== 16 September ===
List of shipwrecks: 16 September 1968
| Ship | State | Description |
|---|---|---|
| Babs | United States | The motor vessel sank in Cook Inlet near Anchorage, Alaska. |

=== 17 September ===
List of shipwrecks: 17 September 1968
| Ship | State | Description |
|---|---|---|
| Cerberus, and Coastal Sentry | Liberia; Hong Kong | The T3 tanker caught fire and exploded at Hong Kong whilst being scrapped, setting fire to Coastal Sentry, which was also being scrapped. Both vessels were severely damaged, causing a loss to shipbreakers as a large quantity of steel was nor re-rollable. |

=== 23 September ===
List of shipwrecks: 23 September 1968
| Ship | State | Description |
|---|---|---|
| Hongkong Star | Panama | The cargo ship foundered. |

=== 27 September ===
List of shipwrecks: 27 September 1968
| Ship | State | Description |
|---|---|---|
| Marsha Ann | United States | The motor vessel was lost off Adak Island in the Aleutian Islands. |

=== 29 September ===
List of shipwrecks: 29 September 1968
| Ship | State | Description |
|---|---|---|
| Polyxeni | Somalia | The cargo ship struck a submerged object and sprang a leak. She was on a voyage from Sundsvall, Norway to Calcutta, India. She was beached the next day at Port Dauphiné, Madagascar, where she became a total loss. |

== October ==
=== 1 October ===
List of shipwrecks: 1 October 1968
| Ship | State | Description |
|---|---|---|
| Carmen B | United States | The motor vessel was destroyed by fire at False Pass, Alaska. |

=== 5 October ===
List of shipwrecks: 5 October 1968
| Ship | State | Description |
|---|---|---|
| Evie | United States | The motor vessel sank off Point Stanhope (56°00′50″N 132°36′10″W) in Southeast Alaska. |

=== 10 October ===
List of shipwrecks: 10 October 1968
| Ship | State | Description |
|---|---|---|
| Dumaguete | Philippines | The ferry sank near Zamboanga, Mindanao. Only eleven survivors of between 300 and 500 people on board. |
| El Fausto | Spain | The 46-foot (14 m) fishing vessel went missing since leaving Tazacorte, La Palma, Canary Islands on 20 July. They were spotted on 25 July but refused assistance. She was found on 9 October with one crewman dead and the other two missing. The vessel was taken under tow but sank next day over 600 miles (970 km) from home. |

=== 15 October ===
List of shipwrecks: 15 October 1968
| Ship | State | Description |
|---|---|---|
| E Evangelia | Greece | The wreck of E Evangelica in January 2008. The cargo ship ran aground in the Black Sea off Constanţa, Romania (43°58′N 28°39′E). Declared a constructive total loss. |

=== 16 October ===
List of shipwrecks: 16 October 1968
| Ship | State | Description |
|---|---|---|
| Alvin | United States | The sunken Alvin photographed on the ocean bottom in June 1969. The deep submergence vehicle sank in the Atlantic Ocean at approximately 39°53′30″N 069°15′30″W, about 88 nautical miles (163 km) south of Nantucket Island, when steel cables lowering her over the side of the research ship Lulu snapped and she fell into the water with her hatch open. All three crew members escaped. Alvin was refloated in September 1969, overhauled, and returned to service. |

=== 19 October ===
List of shipwrecks: 19 October 1968
| Ship | State | Description |
|---|---|---|
| USS Archerfish | United States Navy | The Balao-class submarine was sunk as a target in the Pacific Ocean off San Diego, California by the submarine USS Snook (United States Navy). |

=== 21 October ===
List of shipwrecks: 21 October 1968
| Ship | State | Description |
|---|---|---|
| Acadia Kingfisher | Canada | The 128.5-foot (39.2 m) fishing vessel sprang a leak in heavy weather in the Gulf of St. Lawrence and crew was taken off by a trawler. She sank the next day while under tow at (48°50′N 62°35′W). |
| Paso Tiempo | United States | The motor vessel sank in Thorne Arm (57°56′N 152°50′W) on the west coast of Prince of Wales Island in Southeast Alaska. |
| Sitakund | Norway | The tanker exploded and sank 17 nautical miles (31 km) south of Eastbourne, Sussex with the loss of three crew. Thirty-nine crew saved by the Eastbourne Lifeboat Beryl Tollemache ( Royal National Lifeboat Institution) and the frigate HMS Mohawk (Royal Navy). |

=== 26 October ===
List of shipwrecks: 26 October 1968
| Ship | State | Description |
|---|---|---|
| "Jean Marcel" | United Kingdom | The 19-ton fishing vessel suffered a fractured seacock and sank in 10 fathoms of water 12 miles off Lightning Knoll Buoy. Crew taken off by "Girl Mary" (United Kingdom) before she sank. |

=== 31 October ===
List of shipwrecks: 31 October 1968
| Ship | State | Description |
|---|---|---|
| Etnefjell | Norway | The second Norwegian tanker in ten days to have an explosion and fire evacuated 29 members of its crew into two lifeboats, 350 nautical miles (650 km; 400 mi) southeast of Cape Farewell, Greenland The master, chief mate and first engineer remained behind, and were four days later by USCGC Absecon (United States Coast Guard). One man was found dead on the ship; the lifeboats were never located after a 10-day search. |

== November ==
=== 3 November ===
List of shipwrecks: 3 November 1968
| Ship | State | Description |
|---|---|---|
| Sacrum Cor | Italy | The cargo ship sank at Vado during a storm. |

=== 7 November ===
List of shipwrecks: 7 November 1968
| Ship | State | Description |
|---|---|---|
| Newglade | United Kingdom | The cargo ship caught fire at Kynosoura, Greece. She was beached in Ambelaki Bay. She was refloated on 19 November and found to be severely damaged. Consequently scrapped. |

=== 11 November ===
List of shipwrecks: 11 November 1968
| Ship | State | Description |
|---|---|---|
| Cyrus II | Iran | The Victory ship was damaged by fire at Durban, South Africa. Consequently scrapped. |
| Empire Ace | United Kingdom | The Near-Warrior type tug ran aground off Campbeltown, Argyllshire. She was refloated in June 1969 but was declared a constructive total loss and consequently scrapped. |
| Steepholm | United Kingdom | She was wrecked off South Wales. Four crewmen of the sand dredger were saved by the Atlantic College lifeboat and the Porthcawl lifeboat in partnership with the Mumbles lifeboat. |

=== 15 November ===
List of shipwrecks: 15 November 1968
| Ship | State | Description |
|---|---|---|
| YC-21 | United Kingdom | The barge sank off Hoy, Scapa Flow, Orkney Islands, while salvaging the wreck of F-2 (Kriegsmarine). |

=== 17 November ===
List of shipwrecks: 17 November 1968
| Ship | State | Description |
|---|---|---|
| U.S. Defender | United States | Vietnam War: The Victory ship was damaged by Viet Cong shellfire at Da Nang, Vietname. Although temporarily repaired, she was consequently scrapped in March 1970. |

=== 24 November ===
List of shipwrecks: 24 November 1968
| Ship | State | Description |
|---|---|---|
| Celtic | United States | The 57-gross register ton, 65.5-foot (20.0 m) fishing vessel was wrecked in Ouzinkie Narrows (57.9103°N 152.5086°W) on the southeast end of Spruce Island (57°55′30″N 152°29′50″W) in Alaska's Kodiak Archipelago. |
| Dumbo | Panama | The Tudor-Queen-class coaster was driven ashore at Las Palmas, Spain. She was declared a constructive total loss. |

=== 28 November ===
List of shipwrecks: 28 November 1968
| Ship | State | Description |
|---|---|---|
| Review | United States | A storm destroyed the motor vessel at Ketchikan, Alaska. |

== December ==
=== 7 December ===
List of shipwrecks: 7 December 1968
| Ship | State | Description |
|---|---|---|
| USCGC White Alder | United States Coast Guard | The buoy tender was sunk in a collision with the motor vessel Helena (Taiwan) in the Mississippi River near White Castle, Louisiana. Only three of her 20 crewmen survived. |

=== 8 December ===
List of shipwrecks: 8 December 1968
| Ship | State | Description |
|---|---|---|
| USS Jesse Rutherford | United States Navy | The decommissioned John C. Butler-class destroyer escort was sunk as a target in the Pacific Ocean off California. |

=== 12 December ===
List of shipwrecks: 12 December 1968
| Ship | State | Description |
|---|---|---|
| North Sea | United States | The crab-fishing vessel was wrecked in the Aleutian Islands on the northwest coast of Unimak Island near Cape Sarichef with the loss of three lives Her sole survivors was rescued by United States Coast Guard personnel. |

=== 13 December ===
List of shipwrecks: 13 December 1968
| Ship | State | Description |
|---|---|---|
| Witwater | Saint Vincent and the Grenadines | The tanker broke in tow off Colón, Panama. She was on a voyage from Las Minas to Cristóbal, Panama. The bow section sank (9°25′N 79°49′W). She was declared a constructive total loss. |

=== 19 December ===
List of shipwrecks: 19 December 1968
| Ship | State | Description |
|---|---|---|
| Gold Sky | Panama | The cargo ship sprang a leak and sank in the Mediterranean Sea 20 nautical miles (37 km; 23 mi) off Gibraltar. The crew were rescued by Otto Leonhardt (West Germany). Her insurers alleged that she had been scuttled. A court hearing decided that, on the balance of probabilities, she had been. |

=== 21 December ===
List of shipwrecks: 21 December 1968
| Ship | State | Description |
|---|---|---|
| Sea Ermine | United States | The crab-fishing vessel was wrecked on Marmot Island in the Kodiak Archipelago near Kodiak, Alaska. The United States Coast Guard rescued all five people on board. |

=== 22 December ===
List of shipwrecks: 22 December 1968
| Ship | State | Description |
|---|---|---|
| Federal Queen | United Kingdom | The schooner capsized and sank off Canouan Island, Saint Vincent and the Grenadines. Forty-one of the 79 people on board were killed. |
| Helisoma | United Kingdom | The tanker struck a Vietcong mine in a South Vietnamese port and was damaged. |

=== 23 December ===
List of shipwrecks: 23 December 1968
| Ship | State | Description |
|---|---|---|
| Glee | Cyprus | The Liberty ship ran aground on Marmara Island, Turkey. She was declared a constructive total loss. |

=== 24 December ===
List of shipwrecks: 24 December 1968
| Ship | State | Description |
|---|---|---|
| Azuero | Panama | The Liberty ship ran aground in the Gironde and broke in two, a total loss. |

=== Unknown date ===
List of shipwrecks: Unknown date in December 1968
| Ship | State | Description |
|---|---|---|
| Bulby | South Africa | The stripped, out of service 136.1-foot (41.5 m), 361-ton fishing trawler was scuttled in the Irvin Johnson Artificial Reef, False Bay, South Africa. |
| Marinda | South Africa | The fishing trawler was scuttled off the coast of South Africa. |

== Unknown date ==
List of shipwrecks: Unknown date 1968
| Ship | State | Description |
|---|---|---|
| Beaver | United States | The 14-gross register ton, 42-foot (12.8 m) motor cargo vessel was destroyed by a storm at Lake Minchumina in central Alaska during or before 1968. |
| ARA Comodoro Augusto Lasserre | Argentine Navy | The survey ship ran aground near Lion Island in the Palmer Archipelago off the Antarctic Peninsula. She was later refloated. |
| USCGC Dexter | United States Coast Guard | The decommissioned Casco-class cutter was sunk as a target by the United States Navy. |
| Manchester Miller | United Kingdom | The cargo liner caught fire and sank at New York, United States. Subsequently refloated, repaired and returned to service. |
| Matrouh | United Arab Republic Navy | The corvette sank in 1968 or 1969. |
