= Mast stepping =

Act of raising the mast of a sailing vessel

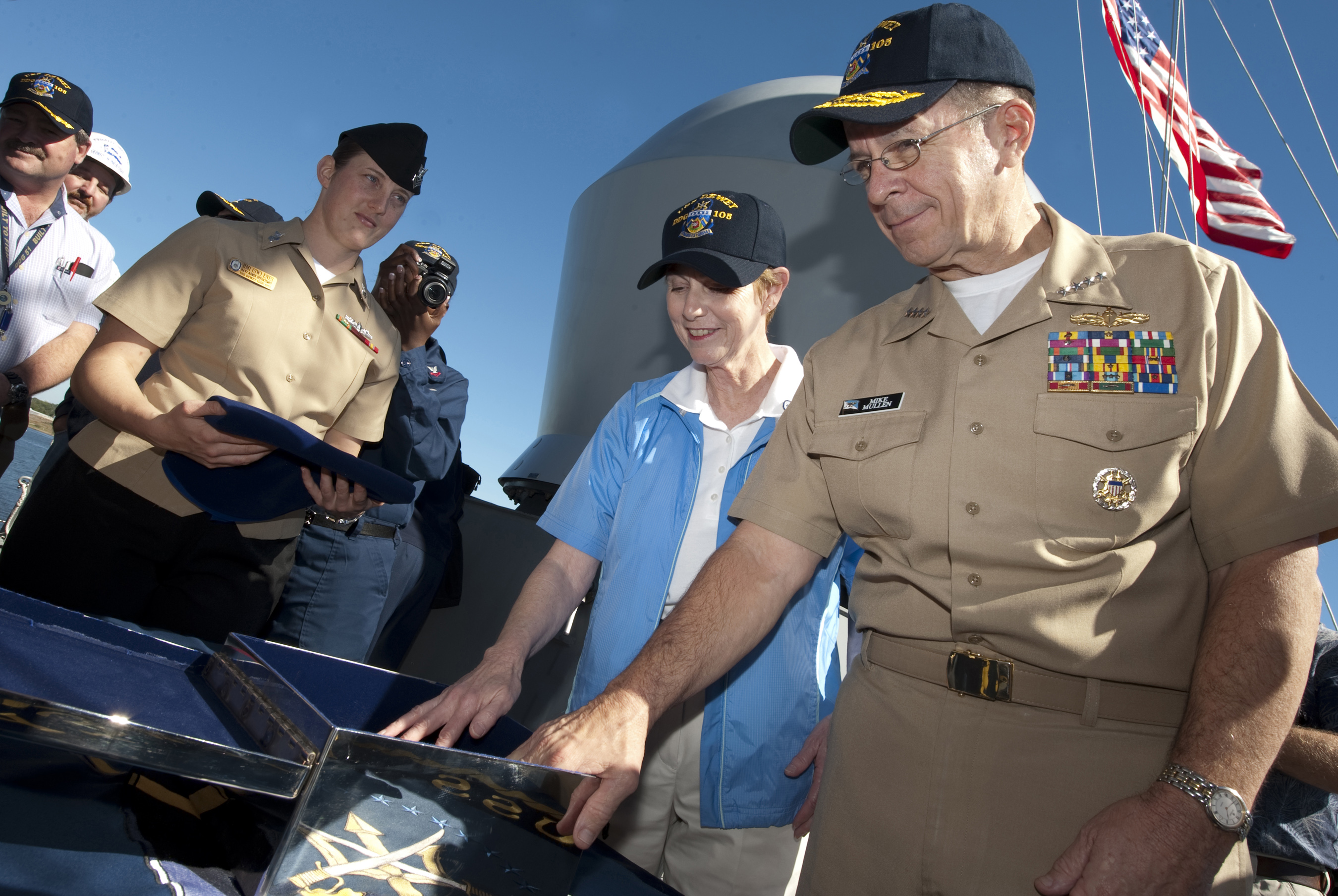
Chairman of the Joint Chiefs of Staff Admiral Mike Mullen putting good luck pieces into a box, during a mast stepping ceremony for the USS Dewey (DDG-105) at Northrop Grumman Shipbuilding in Pascagoula, Mississippi in 2009

Mast stepping is the process of raising the mast of a boat. It may be a ceremonial occasion on a new boat, a necessary step (as in stepping the mast of a small sailing dinghy or gig), or simply routine (as following seasonal maintenance on a sailboat).

The ceremony involves placing or welding one or more coins into the mast step of a ship, and is seen as an important ceremonial occasion in a ship's construction, thought to bring good luck. Although the coins were originally placed under the main-mast of a ship, they are now generally welded under the radar mast or laid in the keel as part of a keel laying ceremony.

== History ==
The ceremonial practice is believed to have originated in ancient Rome. One theory is that due to the dangers of early sea travel, the coins were placed under the mast so that the crew would be able to cross to the afterlife if the ship were sunk. The Romans believed it was necessary for a person to take coins with them to pay Charon in order to cross the river Styx to the afterlife, and as a result of this coins were placed in the mouths of the dead before they were buried. Another theory for this practice is that the insertion of coins in buildings and ships may have functioned as a form of sacrifice to thank the gods for a successful construction, or as a request for divine protection in the future. A third theory is that corrosion-resistant coins of gold or silver provided a physical barrier, minimizing the transmission of rot between the wooden mast and wooden mast step.

The Blackfriars I shipwreck (circa 150 A.D.) had a coin in the mast-step.

== See also ==
- Coin ceremony
