= Coin ceremony =

Act of placing a coin under a ship's keel for good luck

The coin ceremony is an event which takes place at the keel laying, in the early stages of a ship's construction. In it, the shipbuilders place one or two coins under the keel block of the new ship to bless the ship and as a symbol of good fortune. The coins are not normally fixed in place and are often retrieved when the ship sails out of the dry-dock, (although they are sometimes welded to the keel).

The mast stepping ceremony is a similar event which occurs towards the end of a ship's construction, and involves the placing of coins underneath the mast of a ship. In shipbuilding today, the coins are normally welded beneath the radar mast.
