= USCGC Citrus =

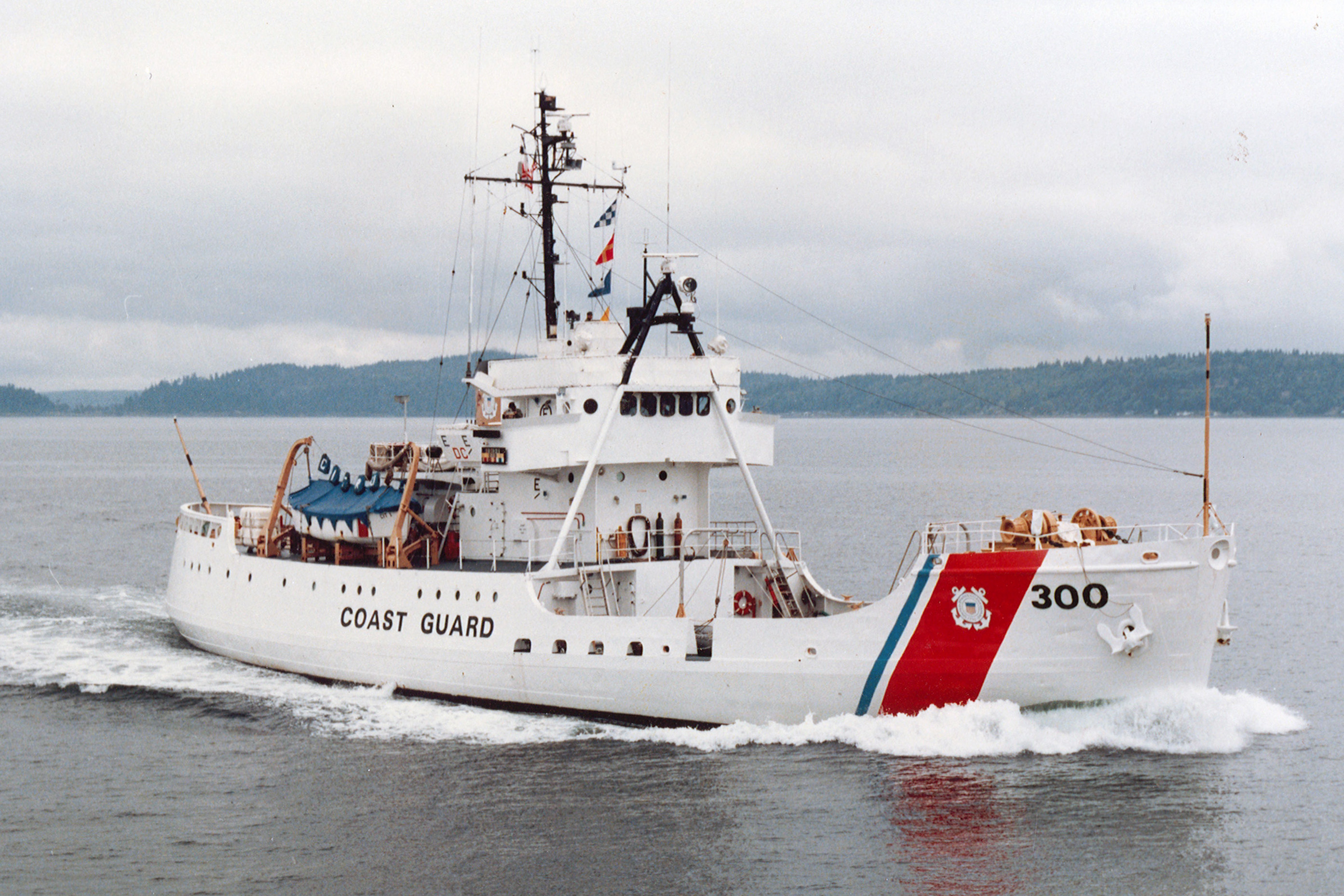
- USCGC Citrus in 1984 after conversion to a medium-endurance cutter.

History

United States
- Name: USCGC Citrus
- Builder: Marine Iron & Shipbuilding Corporation; Duluth, Minnesota
- Cost: $853,987
- Laid down: 29 April 1942
- Launched: 15 August 1942
- Commissioned: 3 April 1943
- Decommissioned: 1 September 1994
- Identification: Call sign: NRPQ; Hull number: WLB-300
- Nickname(s): "Sit and Rust"
- Fate: Transferred to the Dominican Navy

Dominican Republic
- Name: Almirante Juan Alejandro Acosta
- Acquired: 1995
- Decommissioned: 2012
- Identification: 1995-2006: C-456; 2006-2012: PA-302
- Status: Decommissioned

General characteristics
- Class & type: Cactus (A) seagoing buoy tender
- Displacement: 935 long tons (950 t) full load (1945); 1,026 long tons (1,042 t) full load (1966); 700 long tons (711 t) light (1966)
- Length: 180 ft (55 m)
- Beam: 37 ft (11 m)
- Draft: 12 ft (3.7 m) (1945); 14.6 ft (4.5 m) (1966)
- Propulsion: 1 electric motor connected to 2 Westinghouse generators driven by 2 Cooper-Bessemer-type GND-8, 4-cycle diesel engines; single screw
- Speed: 13.0 kn (24.1 km/h) sustained (1945); 11.9 kn (22.0 km/h) sustained (1966); 8.3 kn (15.4 km/h) economic(1945); 8.5 kn (15.7 km/h) economic(1966)
- Complement: 6 officers, 74 men (1945); 4 officers, 2 warrants, 47 men (1966)
- Sensors & processing systems: Radar: Bk (1943); SLa-1 (1945); SPS-64(V) (2007); Sonar: WEA-2 (1945)
- Armament: 1 × single 3 in (76 mm)/50 cal. gun; 4 × single 20 mm (0.79 in)/80 cal. cannon; 2 × depth charge tracks, 2 × Mousetrapss; 4 × Y-guns (1945); None (1966); 102 mm (4 in)/45 DP gun; 2 × 20 mm cannon; 4 × 7.62 mm (0.30 in) M60 (2007)

USCGC Citrus (WAGL-300/WLB-300/WMEC-300) was a Cactus (A)-class seagoing buoy tender built in 1942 in Duluth, Minnesota, and now operated by the navy of the Dominican Republic.

During World War II, the 180-foot ship helped build LORAN stations on the Aleutian Islands. From 1945 to 1979, Citrus largely helped maintain aids to navigation in Alaskan waters. In 1980, she was converted into a medium-endurance cutter homeported at Coos Bay, Oregon.

In 1995, after 51 years' service, it was transferred to the Dominican Navy, which commissioned it Almirante Juan Alejandro Acosta.

== Ship's history ==
After the Coast Guard took over the United States Lighthouse Service in 1939, the plans for the USLS Juniper class of 177 ft (54 m) seagoing buoy tenders were modified to 180 ft (55 m). These were built in three classes. The Cactus (A) class had 12 vessels, the Mesquite (B) class had six, and the Iris (C) class had 20. Twenty were built at one of two shipyards in Duluth, Minnesota.

Citrus was laid down on 29 April 1942 at the Marine Iron & Shipbuilding Corporation in Duluth. She was launched on 15 August 1942 and commissioned on 3 April 1943.

=== World War II ===
USCGC Citrus was initially assigned to the Ninth District in April 1943. With home port in Detroit, Michigan, the cutter was to be used for general aids to navigation and icebreaking on the Great Lakes.

The cutter was reassigned to Alaska Sector, Northwestern Sea Frontier on 15 September 1943. Construction work on the Western Aleutian LORAN chain began during the latter part of 1943. Beginning in November 1943, men and materials began to arrive at sites 62 (Sitka), 63 (Amchitka), and 64 (Attu). Citrus and two Liberty ships, SS George Flavel and SS McKenzie, transported Coast Guard construction crews to erect Quonset huts for Construction Detachment "A" at Massacre Bay, Attu and at Baxter Cove, Adak. Unloading at Adak was done with 5' x 7' steel pontoon-type barges. They arrived on 24 December 1943. Heavy ground swells made unloading materiel from the cutter to the barge precarious. Despite the possibility of a sudden squall, both barges made the beach about sundown. Temporary floodlights were then rigged and unloading operations continued until 1200 on Christmas Day. As the storm increased in intensity, Citrus was unable to maintain her anchorage and was forced to return to Massacre Bay until the storm subsided on 2 January 1944.

Early in February 1944, a five-day storm swept the Massacre Bay area with winds up to 125 mph (201 km/h). At Attu, Citrus took nine men off a swamped Army tug without loss of life and then sank the foundering tug with gunfire. Citrus also assisted in getting a Liberty ship off the beach after it had been driven ashore by a severe storm. Citrus arrived at Ketchikan on 7 February 1944.

On 20 February, Citrus was dispatched to assist Mary D which was hard aground on Point St. Alban's Reef. With the assistance of USCGC Hemlock and LT-151. Mary D was re-floated. After jettisoning some cargo, she could continue on to Ketchikan. On 27 February 1944, Citrus was dispatched to the assistance of Army tug USAT ST-169 in distress in Chatham Strait after losing its crib tow.

On 17 October 1944 Citrus departed Petersburg to render assistance to ATS Brunswick aground in Wrangell Narrows. Citrus pulled her afloat and the latter continued on under its own power. Citrus spent the remainder of the war conducting aids to navigation, logistics, and vessel escort duties in Southwestern Alaskan waters.

=== Postwar ===
From the end of the war until 29 June 1964, Citrus continued to be stationed at Ketchikan and conducted aids to navigation duties. On 9 September 1948, Citrus assisted MV Caledonia in Idaho Inlet. From 29–31 October 1948, the tender assisted USNS Mission Santa Cruz.

From 13–19 February 1950, Citrus searched for a missing USAF plane near the Wrangell Narrows. During 25–27 August 1950, the cutter provided assistance to the barge Bisco 3 near Ratz Harbor and a fishing vessel Vermay near Cape Muzon, and towed the power scow Chichagof near Cape Chacon.

On 19 May 1951, Citrus escorted USCGC White Holly to Ketchikan after the latter struck a rock. On 25 May 1951, Citrus assisted fishing vessel Dolores near Point Gardner and from 21 to 27 July 1951 Citrus searched for a missing Canadian Douglas DC-4 aircraft.

During 15–19 January 1952, Citrus escorted USCGC Cahoone to Sitka. On 8 June 1952, the cutter towed the fishing vessel Pioneer to Ketchikan and assisted the fishing vessel Hobo near Lincoln Island on 13 August 1952. Ten days later, on 23 August 1952 Citrus assisted the fishing vessel Cinuk in the Behm Canal.

On 24 August 1953, it helped the tug Saturn recover its lost tow at 56° 25' N, 14° 28' W. Citrus then spent 25–30 August 1953 searching for, finding, and towing a scow to Ketchikan. On 13 October 1953, Citrus assisted the grounded APL-55 near the Dangerous River.

From 30 June 1964 to 1979 Citrus was stationed at Kodiak, Alaska, and operated frpom there in support of aids to navigation. On 12 February 1965, she located two Soviet fishing vessels 3.4 mi (5.5 km) from U.S. territory. After she notified them they had entered U.S. territorial waters, they departed.

On 8 March 1965, the Citrus's crew fought a fire on MV Kalaikh off Alaska and towed her to Kodiak. On 3 May 1965, Citrus transported a seaman from the Soviet fishing vessel Churkzn to Kodiak Island.

On 6 February 1967, the fishing vessel Astronaut was wrecked on the coast of Akutan Island in the Aleutian Islands. Her four crewmen reached shore and survived. Two skiffs – one each from the vessels Honey B and Menshikov – were wrecked trying to reach them; all four crewmen aboard the skiffs survived and joined Astronaut's four crewmen on the beach. The fishing vessel American Star rescued four of them, and aircraft dropped tents and sleeping bags to the other four. Eventually, Citrus arrived on the scene and rescued them.

From 24 to 26 January 1968, the crew of Citrus fought a fire on the Japanese motor vessel Seifu Maru in Dutch Harbor, Alaska. On 9 August 1968, she assisted the distressed motor vessel Dantzler after Dantzler ran aground, and she escorted Dantzler from near Cook Inlet to Homer, Alaska.

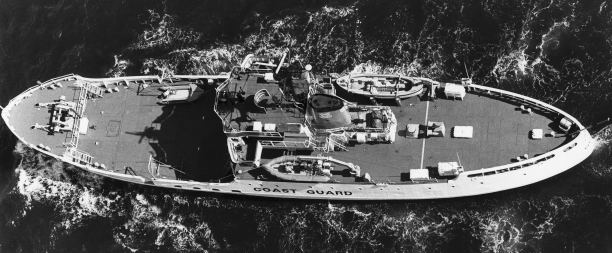
USCGC Citrus after conversion to a medium-endurance cutter

On 1 April 1969, Citrus flew a patient from the fishing vessel Zulyo Maru off Alaska. On 8 May 1970, she towed the disabled fishing vessel Shirley Rose to Kodiak. On 20 October 1970, Citrus's crew rescued 31 [people from the grounded ferry Tustumena near Kodiak.

On 19 January 1974 Citrus searched for missing crew members from the fishing trawler John and Olaf in the Gulf of Alaska.

On 27 February 1979, Citrus struck a submerged object in the Ouzinkie Narrows between Kodiak Island and Spruce Island. Although there were no casualties, the ship sustained significant damage. In March 1979 Citrus was converted into a medium-endurance cutter.

=== Medium-endurance cutter duty ===
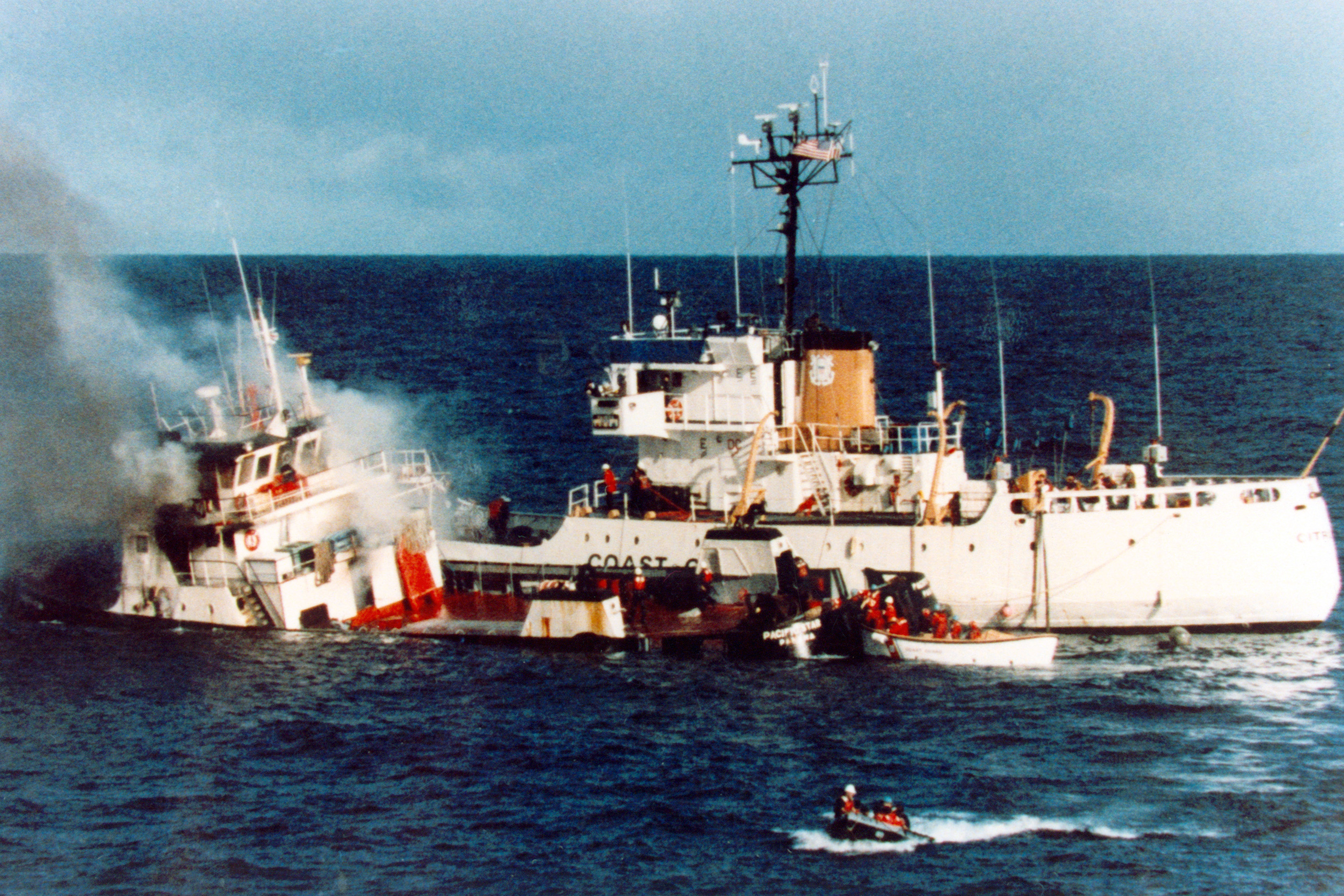
MV Pacific Star after ramming USCG Citrus

Upon her conversion to a medium endurance cutter, Citrus' home port was Coos Bay, Oregon. The cutter's mission was primarily law enforcement and search and rescue. Her primary law enforcement activities involved the boarding of domestic and foreign fishing vessels.

After attempting to send a boarding party for a drug search on 1 January 1985, Citrus was rammed by the Panamanian MV Pacific Star 680 mi (1,094 km) southwest of San Diego. Pacific Star was scuttled by its crew. Seven crewmen were rescued and 1,000 lb (454 kg) of marijuana was seized.

== Awards and honors ==
Throughout her 51 years of service, Citrus was decorated with four Unit Commendations, three Meritorious Unit Commendations, two Arctic Service Medals, the American Defense Medal, World War II Victory Medal, the American Campaign Medal, the Asiatic-Pacific Medal, and the National Defense Service Medal.

== Dominican Navy ==
Citrus was initially transferred to the Mexican Navy, but delivery was refused in February 1995. Citrus was transferred to the Dominican Navy on 16 September 1995, and renamed Almirante Juan Alejandro Acosta (C-456). It was rearmed with a 102 mm 45 caliber DP gun, two single Oerlikon 20 mm cannons, and four 7.62 mm (0.30 in) M60 machine guns. Acosta was decommissioned by the Dominican Navy in 2012.
