= MV Nyon =

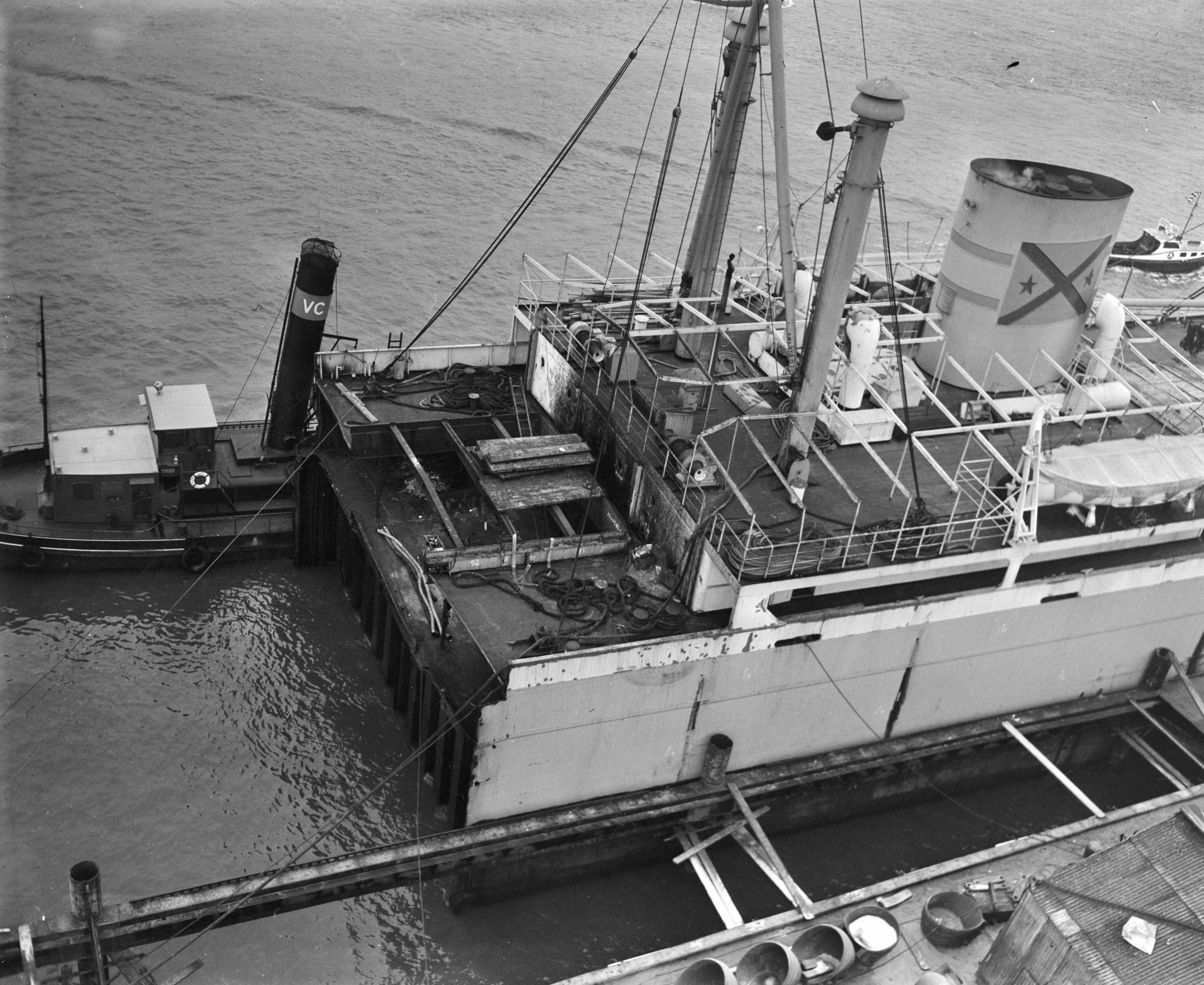
- Half of the Nyon dragged into the docks of Bolnes

History
- Name: Nyon
- Owner: Suisse-Atlantique Societé de Navigation Maritime SA (1952–56); Helica SA (1956–62)
- Operator: Suisse-Atlantique Societé de Navigation Maritime SA (1952–56); Suisse Outremer SA de Gérance et d'Affretement Maritimes (1956–58); Suisse-Atlantique Societé de Navigation Maritime SA (1958–62)
- Port of registry: Basel, Switzerland
- Builder: C Van der Giessen & Zoon
- Yard number: 760
- Launched: 16 July 1952
- In service: 17 October 1952
- Out of service: 15 June 1962
- Identification: Swiss Official Number 050; Code Letters HBFC
- Fate: Sank 1962

General characteristics
- Tonnage: 4,956 GRT (1952–58); 5,364 GRT (1959–62); 2,894 NRT (1952–58); 3,065 NRT (1959–62); 9,540 DWT (1952–58); 10,003 DWT (1959–62)
- Length: 136.29 m (447 ft 2 in) (1952–58); 141.69 m (464 ft 10 in) (1959–62)
- Beam: 17.52 m (57 ft 6 in)
- Draught: 7.52 m (24 ft 8 in)
- Installed power: 3,500 hp (2,600 kW)
- Propulsion: Diesel engine
- Speed: 12.5 knots (23.2 km/h)
- Crew: 33

Nyon was a 5,364 GRT cargo ship that was built in 1952. She ran aground in 1958, and was cut in two in order to salvage her. The stern section was salvaged and a new bow section built and fitted in 1959. She served until 1962 when she was involved in a collision with another ship and sank.

== Description ==
As built, Nyon was 136.29 metres (447 ft 2 in) long, with a beam of 17.52 metres (57 ft 6 in) and a draught of 7.52 metres (24 ft 8 in). She was assessed as 4,956 GRT, 2,894 NRT, 9,540 DWT.

She was propelled by a 3,500 horsepower (2,600 kW) 5-cylinder MAN diesel engine, which drove a single screw propeller. It could propel the ship at 12.5 knots (23.2 km/h).

== History ==
Nyon was built in 1952 by C Van der Giessen & Zoon, Scheepswerf De Hoop, Krimpen aan den IJssel, South Holland, the Netherlands. She was built for the Suisse-Atlantique Societé de Navigation Maritime SA, Lausanne, Switzerland. Nyon was launched on 16 July 1952 and delivered on 17 October 1952. She had a crew of 33. Nyon was allocated the Swiss Official Number 050 and Code Letters HBFC. Her port of registry was Basel. In 1956, Nyon was sold to Helica SA, Geneva. She was placed under the management of Suisse Outremer SA de Gérance et d'Affretement Maritimes, Geneva.

On 16 November 1958, Nyon was on a voyage from Leith, Midlothian to Dakar, Senegal when she ran aground at St. Abbs Head, Berwickshire. At the time there was dense fog in the area. Two forward holds were breached, with a total of five holes between them. The fishing boat Emulate of Eyemouth brought bags of cement to Nyon, which were used in an unsuccessful attempt to plug the holes. The British tugs George V and Beamish attempted to refloat the ship without success. On 20 November 23 of the crew were taken off by a lifeboat. That day, the decision was made to cut the ship in two, salvaging the stern portion. Wijsmuller Salvage of the Netherlands were awarded the contract under Lloyd's Open Form rules. The ocean-going tugs Simson and Hector were despatched to Scotland. On 21 November, the operation to separate the two parts of the ship began. The sides were cut on 23 November, leaving just the bottom plates intact. Although all four tugs attempted to separate the two sections, they were unsuccessful. On 25 November, it was decided to use explosives to part the two sections of the ship. This was achieved on 27 November. The stern part of Nyon was towed to North Shields, Northumberland, arriving on 28 November. The bow section was left in situ and was destroyed in a gale some days later. Following further work to strengthen the stern section, it was towed to Bolnes, South Holland, Netherlands, in February 1959. A new bow section was manufactured by NV Boeles Shipyards, Bolnes, and fitted on 8 June 1959.

Following the rebuild, Nyon was 5.40 metres (17 ft 9 in) longer, measuring 141.69 metres (464 ft 10 in). She was assessed as 5,365 GRT, 3,065 NRT, 10,003 DWT. On 15 June 1962, Nyon was on a voyage from Antwerp, Belgium to Montreal, Quebec, Canada, when she collided in foggy conditions with the Indian cargo ship Jalazad in the English Channel, some 5 nautical miles (9.3 km) south of Beachy Head, East Sussex. A mayday was broadcast giving her position as 50°32′N 1°30′E, some 80 nautical miles (150 km) west of her true position. Nyon sank within fourteen minutes. All 32 crew were rescued by Jalazad.
