= HMS Foyle =

Destroyer of the Royal Navy

History

United Kingdom
- Name: HMS Foyle
- Ordered: 1902 – 1903 Naval Estimates
- Builder: Cammell Laird, Birkenhead
- Laid down: 12 June 1902
- Launched: 25 February 1903
- Commissioned: March 1904
- Fate: 15 March 1917 struck a contact mine laid by German submarine UC-68 off Plymouth

General characteristics
- Class & type: Laird-type River-class destroyer
- Displacement: 550 long tons (559 t) standard; 625 long tons (635 t) full load
- Length: 226 ft 6 in (69.0 m) o/a
- Beam: 23 ft 9 in (7.2 m)
- Draught: 7 ft 9 in (2.4 m)
- Propulsion: 4 × Yarrow type water tube boiler; 2 × vertical triple expansion (VTE) steam engines driving 2 shafts producing 7,000 shp (5,200 kW) (average)
- Speed: 25.5 knots (47.2 km/h)
- Range: 140 tons coal; 1,870 nmi (3,460 km) at 11 kn (20 km/h)
- Complement: 70 officers and men
- Armament: 1 × QF 12-pounder 12 cwt Mark I, mounting P Mark I; 3 × QF 12-pounder 8 cwt, mounting G Mark I (Added in 1906); 5 × QF 6-pounder 8 cwt (removed in 1906); 2 × single tubes for 18-inch (450 mm) torpedoes

Service record
- Part of: East Coast Destroyer Flotilla–1905; 3rd Destroyer Flotilla–April 1909; 5th Destroyer Flotilla –1912; Assigned E Class - August 1912–October 1913; 9th Destroyer Flotilla–1914; 1st Destroyer Flotilla–November 1916
- Operations: World War I 1914–1918

HMS Foyle was a Laird-type River-class destroyer ordered by the Royal Navy under the 1902–1903 Naval Estimates. Named after the River Foyle in Ireland, she was the first ship to carry this name in the Royal Navy.

== Construction ==
Foyle was laid down on 12 June 1902 at the Cammell Laird shipyard at Birkenhead and launched on 25 February 1903. She was completed in March 1903. Her original armament was to be the same as the Turtleback torpedo boat destroyers that preceded her. In 1906 the Admiralty decided to upgrade the armament by landing the five 6-pounder naval guns and shipping three 12-pounder 8 hundredweight (cwt) guns. Two would be mounted abeam at the foc's'le break and the third gun would be mounted on the quarterdeck.

== Service history ==
After commissioning she was assigned to the East Coast Destroyer Flotilla of the 1st Fleet and based at Harwich. On 27 April 1908 the Eastern Flotilla departed Harwich for live fire and night manoeuvres. During these exercises HMS Attentive rammed and sank HMS Gala then damaged HMS Ribble.

In April 1909 she was assigned to the 3rd Destroyer Flotilla of the 1st Fleet on its formation at Harwich. She remained until displaced by a Basilisk-class destroyer by May 1912. She went into reserve in the 5th Destroyer Flotilla of the 2nd Fleet with a nucleus crew.

On 30 August 1912 the Admiralty directed all destroyer classes were to be designated by alpha characters starting with the letter 'A'. The ships of the River class were assigned to the E class. After 30 September 1913, she was known as an E-class destroyer and had the letter 'E' painted on the hull below the bridge area and on either the fore or aft funnel.

== World War I ==
In early 1914 when displaced by G-class destroyers she joined the 9th Destroyer Flotilla based at Chatham tendered to HMS St George. The 9th Flotilla was a patrol flotilla tasked with anti-submarine and counter mining patrols in the Firth of Forth area. By September 1914, she was deployed to Portsmouth and the Dover Patrol. Here she provided anti-submarine, counter mining patrols and defended the Dover Barrage.

In August 1915 with the amalgamation of the 7th and 9th Flotillas, she was assigned to the 1st Destroyer Flotilla when it was redeployed to Portsmouth in November 1916. She was equipped with depth charges for employment in anti-submarine patrols, escorting of merchant ships and defending the Dover Barrage. In spring 1917 as the convoy system was being introduced the 1st Flotilla was employed in convoy escort duties for the English Channel for the remainder of the war.

== Loss ==
On 15 March 1917 HMS Foyle struck a contact mine laid by German submarine UC-68 off Plymouth at position 50°11′N 03°58′W with the loss of 28 officers and ratings. Her bow was blown off and she foundered while under tow to Plymouth.

== Wreck site ==
Her wreck is located at position 50°16′N 04°10′W.

== Pennant numbers ==
Pennant number	From	To
N44	6 Dec 1914	1 Sep 1915
D20	1 Sep 1915	15 Mar 1917

== Bibliography ==
- Chesneau, Roger & Kolesnik, Eugene M., eds. (1979). Conway's All The World's Fighting Ships 1860–1905. London: Conway Maritime Press. ISBN 0-85177-133-5.
- Colledge, J. J.; Warlow, Ben (2006) [1969]. Ships of the Royal Navy: The Complete Record of All Fighting Ships of the Royal Navy from the 15th Century to the Present (3rd Rev ed.). London: Chatham Publishing. ISBN 978-1-86176-281-8. OCLC 67375475.
- Dittmar, F.J.; Colledge, J. J. (1972). British Warships 1914–1919. Shepperton, UK: Ian Allan. ISBN 0-7110-0380-7.
- Friedman, Norman (2009). British Destroyers: From Earliest Days to the Second World War. Barnsley, UK: Seaforth Publishing. ISBN 978-1-84832-049-9.
- Gardiner, Robert & Gray, Randal, eds. (1985). Conway's All The World's Fighting Ships 1906–1921. London: Conway Maritime Press. ISBN 0-85177-245-5.
- Manning, T. D. (1961). The British Destroyer. London: Putnam & Co. OCLC 6470051.
- March, Edgar J. (1966). British Destroyers: A History of Development, 1892–1953; Drawn by Admiralty Permission From Official Records & Returns, Ships' Covers & Building Plans. London: Seeley Service. OCLC 164893555.
