= HMT Agate =

A number of naval trawlers of the Royal Navy were named Agate:

- HMT Agate (1913), sunk in 1918 by SM UC-71
- HMT Agate (1933), ran aground and sank in 1941
