= Ouzinkie Narrows =

Strait in Alaska

The Ouzinkie Narrows is a roughly 2 km long strait between Kodiak Island and Spruce Island (Alaska). The strait separates the two islands. It is located in Kodiak City Borough. In the middle of the Narrows lies Prokoda Island.

== History ==
On 27 February 1979, the USCGC Citrus (WLB-300) struck a submerged object here, although there were no casualties, the ship sustained significant damage.
