= Blackfriars shipwrecks =

Shipwrecks on the River Thames in London discovered in the 1960s–70s

Coordinates: 51.5109°N 0.1038°W

The Blackfriars shipwrecks were a series of wrecks discovered by archaeologist Peter Marsden in the Blackfriars area of the banks of the River Thames in London, England. The wrecks were discovered while building a riverside embankment wall along the River Thames. Marsden discovered the first on 6 September 1962 and the other three were discovered in 1969–1970. Together they are now known as the four Blackfriars wrecks.

== Blackfriars I ==
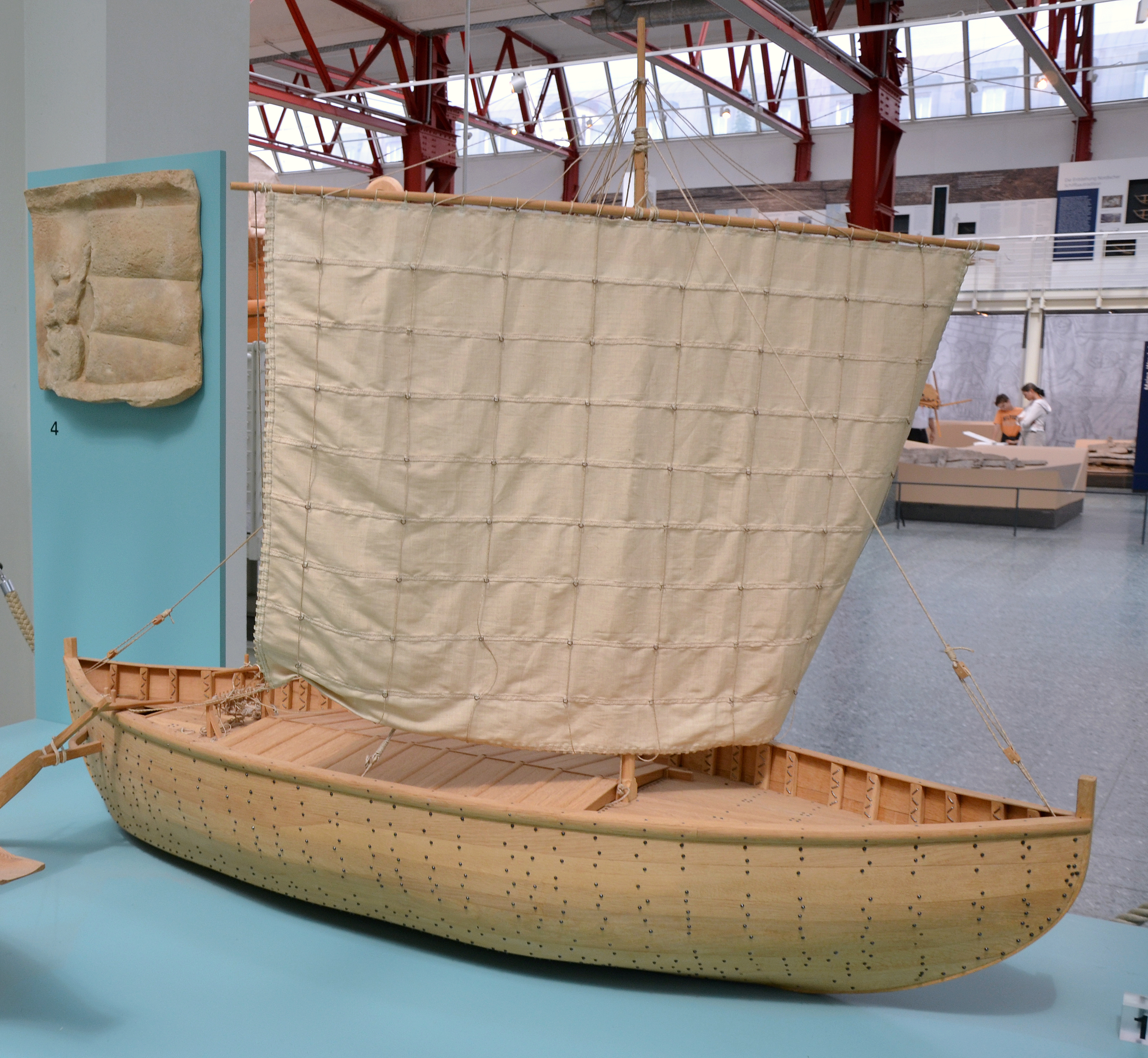
Scale model of Blackfriars I

Discovered by Peter Marsden on 6 September 1962, the first Blackfriars ship became the earliest known indigenous seagoing sailing ship to be found in northern Europe, dating back to the 2nd century AD. The wreck is dated to a period of great Roman expansion and construction. Found between Blackfriars Bridge and Blackfriars Railway Bridge during the construction of a new riverside wall, the Blackfriars I has been variously interpreted as a native Brythonic shipbuilding style or a traditional Roman style.

Blackfriars I was 52–55 feet (16–17 m) long, and 6 metres (20 ft) broad in the beam. The ship was quite flat-bottomed; there was no keel, but "two thick flat keel-planks which lay side by side with a central seam between them". The ship had had a Teredo worm infestation, so it was probably seagoing at some point.

The Blackfriars I was built frame-first, meaning that the frame of the ship was built before building the rest of the ship. This method was much faster and saved wood, and was advanced for the period. Marsden described the ship as having a carvel-built hull, caulked with hazel shavings and pine resin; the hull planks were secured with clench-nails. On the ship, a bronze votive coin of the Emperor Domitian was found in the mast-step. The ship was wrecked while carrying cargo that consisted of 26 long tons (26 t) of Kentish ragstone, a type of building stone. The cargo has shifted to the port side, and the ship had sunk with a list (lean) to port, probably after it was heeled (leaned over) by a collision. With further findings about the area of operation of the ship, Marsden suggested Blackfriars I was used for construction purposes. The rest of the cargo included: two pottery sherds, a wooden mallet, and a piece of leather. Marsden was able to conclude, using the location and position of the wreck, that it crashed into another vessel, a collision which was responsible for the ship sinking.

== Blackfriars II ==
The Blackfriars II was discovered in June 1969 east of Blackfriars Bridge. The ship was carrying a cargo of brick when it was wrecked. Marsden and R. Inman excavated the wreck. Their findings showed that the cargo included new red bricks, pipes and pottery that dated back to 1660–80. With this information, Marsden was able to conclude that the ship was carrying materials meant for rebuilding London after the Great Fire of 1666. The techniques used to build this ship led Marsden to believe that the state of contemporary knowledge of shipbuilding was insufficient for dating small boats.

== Blackfriars III and IV ==
The Blackfriars III and IV were discovered in 1970 in the riverfront extremely close to the sites of the previous two discoveries. The ships date back to the 15th century. The two wrecks are believed to be the result of a deadly collision between the two vessels. The Blackfriars IV is believed to have collided with the Blackfriars III and sunk it. The wreck contained no cargo, but archaeologists, while excavating around the site, found two pewter badges, the bronze arm of a pair of shears, two larger lead weights, and an iron grapnel. Like the other Blackfriars ships, these two appear to have been used to carry and transport building supplies.

The Blackfriars III ship is the most complete medieval sailing ship to be discovered in Britain. It was a sailing ship built around 1400 and was approximately 48 feet (15 m) long, 14 feet (4.3 m) wide and 2 feet 11 inches (0.89 m) high. Marsden believed the ship to resemble a river vessel known as a "shout".

The Blackfriars IV was a clinker-built vessel, built around the 15th century. The vessel was estimated to be very small, only 10 feet (3 m) wide. It is possible that it was a local river craft that was used to unload larger vessels.

== See also ==
- Blackfriars, London
- Blackfriars Bridge
- Classis Britannica
