= MT Sitakund =

Coordinates: 50.719°N 0.240°E

History

Norway
- Name: Sitakund
- Owner: Tschudi & Eitzen
- Builder: Eriksbergs MV AB, Gothenburg, Sweden
- Launched: 3 April 1951
- Identification: IMO number: 5333139
- Fate: Ran aground & exploded 20 October 1968

General characteristics
- Type: Tanker
- Length: 184.36 m (605 ft)
- Beam: 23.53 m (77 ft)
- Draught: 13 m (43 ft)

Sitakund was a Norwegian motor oil tanker owned by Tschudi & Eitzen was sailing from Wilhelmshaven to Libya on 20 October 1968, when three explosions occurred, one of which tore a large hole in the side of the vessel. Sitakund burst into flames. Three crew members died in the explosion and subsequent fire, while the remaining 31 crew were treated in hospital for burns.

The Sitakund had run aground, requiring that the tug Meeching come on site for rescue operations. She was beached on 21 October less than 2 km from Beachy Head. The Eastbourne Fire Brigade, the crew of the Meeching and that of another tug from Dover fought the fire, however there was another explosion during the night, prompting the decision to leave the vessel to burn herself out. The insurers of the ship declared her a constructive total loss. She was later sent to Spain for scrapping.

Around 500 tonnes of bunker oil and ballast were released in the incident.
