= Reinier Nooms =

Dutch maritime painter

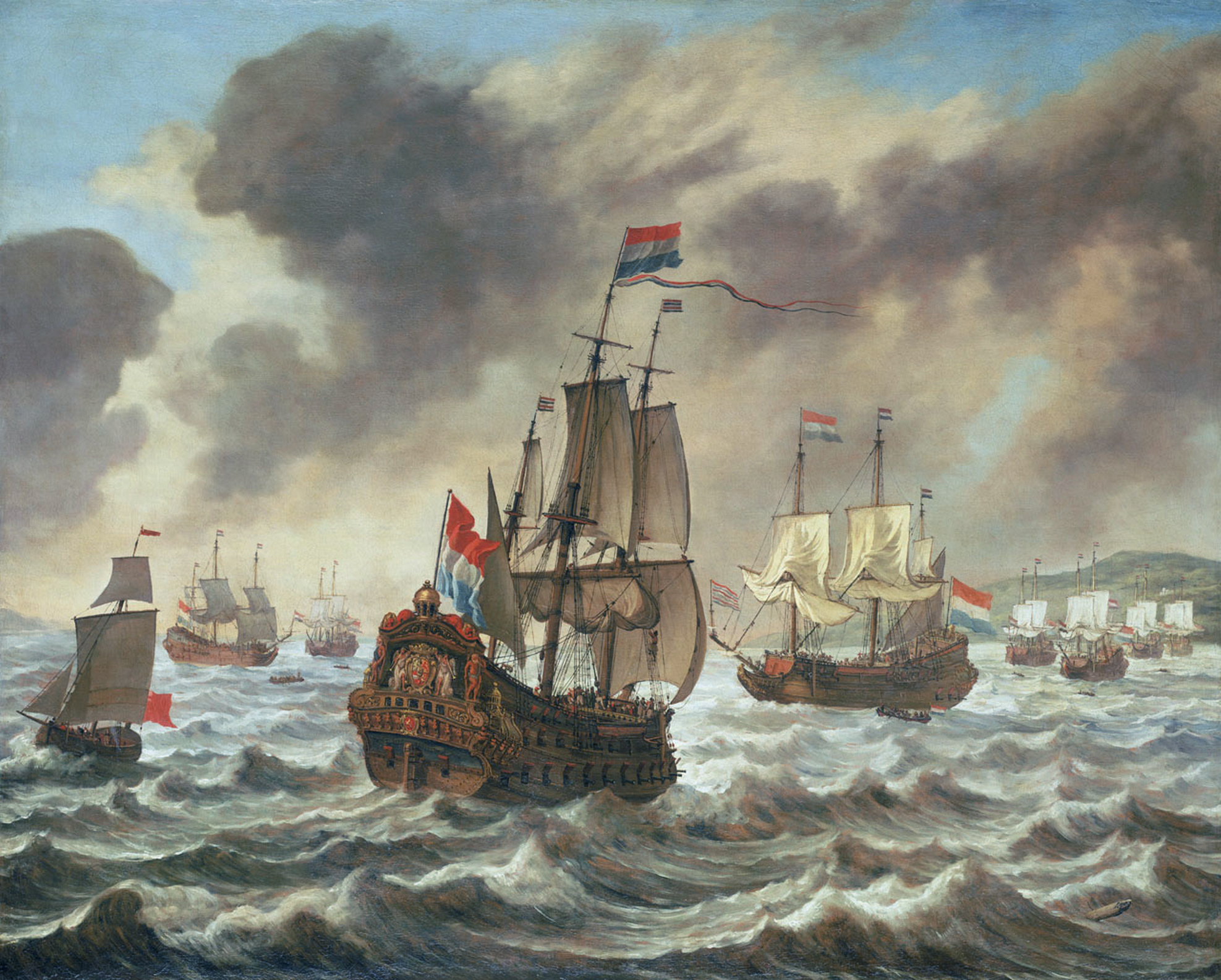
Reinier Nooms: Before the Battle of the Downs, c. 1639

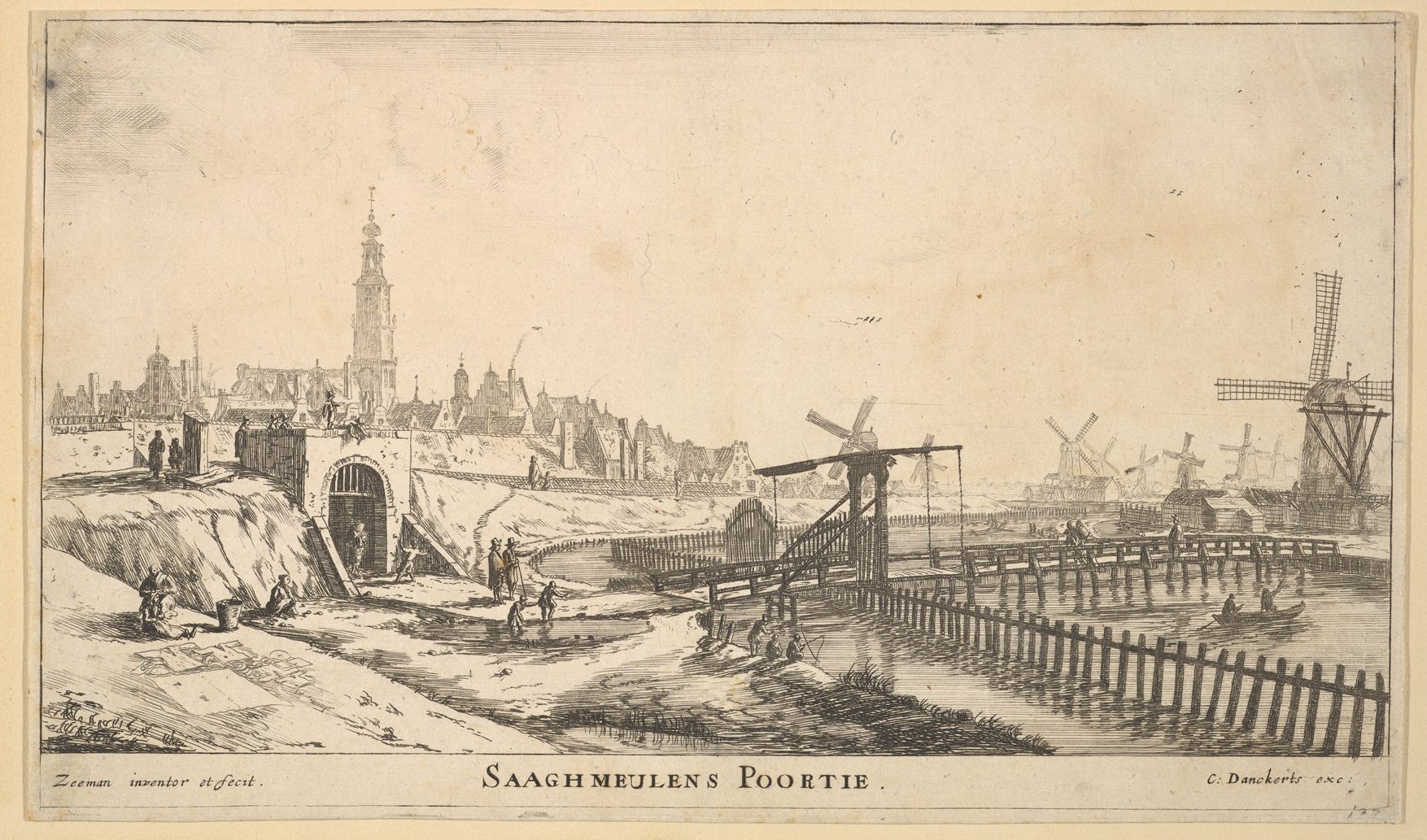
The Zaagmolen Gate around 1663 when the Amsterdam city ramparts were renovated

Reinier Nooms (c. 1623 – 1664), also known as Zeeman or Seeman (Dutch for "sailor"), was a Dutch maritime painter known for his highly detailed paintings and etchings of ships. From the 1650s, Nooms started producing and initially publishing a series of etchings of ships and topographical views. This etching work is characterised by great refinement and was used by many other artists as an example.

== Life ==
Nooms was probably born and died in Amsterdam, but no records survived. From 1643 he started painting and drawing following a rough, drunken life as a sailor. It is not known how he acquired his skill as an artist. His knowledge of ships is evident from his work: ships and foreign locations are depicted with high accuracy and in great detail and served as an example to other artists of how to depict ships.

The Dutch victories in the Anglo-Dutch Wars were a favourite subject of his paintings. For instance, he painted the Amalia, the flagship of admiral Maarten Tromp, before the Battle of the Downs. This painting is on show in the National Maritime Museum in Greenwich, UK. His painting of the Battle of Leghorn in 1653 is in the collection of the Rijksmuseum.

A widely travelled artist, Nooms visited Paris (1650-1652, 1656), Venice and possibly Berlin (1657), and journeyed along the coast of North Africa with Michiel de Ruyter (1661-1663). It is not clear where and when he married Maria Moosijn from Bruges, but the couple had two daughters baptized in 1653 and 1655.

In the 1650s, Nooms made a series of etchings of ships and topographical views characterized by a high degree of detail and precision. These etchings were published by Cornelis Danckerts and Clement de Jonghe and served as an example to many artists.

One of Nooms' final works, from 1664, shows a view of the Amsterdam harbour, with the IJ bay and the 's Lands Zeemagazijn naval arsenal, now the Nederlands Scheepvaartmuseum (Netherlands Maritime Museum). Appropriately, this work is on show in the Netherlands Maritime Museum.

The 19th-century French etcher Charles Meryon was highly influenced by Nooms, whose etchings of Paris cityscapes inspired his own series of Paris etchings. Meryon dedicated some of these works to Nooms in poetic form.
