= The Red Series =

Series of Dutch comics

The Red Series of Suske en Wiske is a popular series of Dutch comics.

Cover to De Stugge Stuyvesant (2001), a typical alliterating Dutch-language title of the series

The name of this series originated in the red covers of the albums. The series' entries comprise most of the Spike and Suzy books, all others fitting into The Blue Series or the specials.

== List of the Red Series albums ==
In this section, the date refers to the date of the first (i.e. non-coloured until 1964) print of the given album. All the following albums have the same date, until a new date has been given to an album. This date is not the same as the date of the first 'coloured' print. A reference between those editions has been given.

Note: the title of album 21 (De cirkusbaron) has been reprinted with the corrected title (De circusbaron) from 1956 onwards. A few other titles have minor changes between the original edition and newer editions as well. Some of the newer editions are also redrawn, some are only edited.

If an album has been published in English, the English title is given as well, preceded by S&S (if the series was titled Spike and Suzy), W&W (for Willy and Wanda), or B&B (for Bob & Bobette). All of these books have also been published in French, though in a slightly different order.

== Early albums (1946–1964) ==
=== 1946 ===
- 0. Rikki en Wiske in Chocowakije (not included in the series until the reedition as #154)

=== 1947 ===
- 1. Op het eiland Amoras (reedited as #68) (W&W: An Island called Hoboken)

=== 1948 ===
- 2. De vliegende aap (reedited as #65 and as #87)
- 3. De sprietatoom (reedited as #42 and #107) (W&W: The Zincshrinker)

=== 1949 ===
- 4. De koning drinkt (reedited as #105) (W&W: The King drinks)
- 5. Prinses Zagemeel (reedited as #129)
- 6. De Zwarte Madam (reedited as #140)

=== 1950 ===
- 7. De Witte Uil (reedited as #134)
- 8. Bibbergoud (reedited as #138) (W&W: A Fool's Gold)
- 9. Lambiorix (reedited as #144)

=== 1951 ===
- 10. De stierentemmer (reedited as #132) (W&W: The "Tender-hearted" Matador)
- 11. De stalen bloempot (reedited as #145) (W&W: The Iron Flowerpotters)
- 12. Het zingende nijlpaard (reedited as #131)
- 13. De Ringelingschat (reedited as #137)

=== 1952 ===
- 14. De Tuftuf-Club (reedited as #133)
- 15. Het bevroren vuur (reedited as #141)
- 16. De sterrenplukkers (reedited as #146)

=== 1953 ===
- 17. De lachende wolf (reedited as #148)
- 18. De dolle musketiers (reedited as #59 and #89) (W&W: The Merry Musketeers)
- 19. De tamtamklopper (reedited as #88)

=== 1954 ===
- 20. De Knokkersburcht (reedited as #127) (S&S: Highland Games)
- 21. De cirkusbaron (reedited as #56 and #81) (W&W: The Circus Baron)
- 22. De speelgoedzaaier (reedited as #55 and #91), loosely based on The Prisoner of Zenda

=== 1955 ===
- 23. De IJzeren Schelvis (reedited as #60 and #76)
- 24. De kleppende klipper (reedited as #95)

=== 1956 ===
- 25. De straatridder (reedited as #83)
- 26. De bokkerijders (reedited as #136)
- 27. De brullende berg (reedited as #58 and #80)

=== 1957 ===
- 28. De spokenjagers (reedited as #52 and #70)
- 29. De snorrende snor (reedited as #64 and #93)
- 30. De stemmenrover (reedited as #62 and #84)

=== 1958 ===
- 31. De mottenvanger (reedited as #142)
- 32. Het sprekende testament (reedited as #119)
- 33. De geverniste zeerovers (reedited as #120)
- 34. De duistere diamant (reedited as #121)

=== 1959 ===
- 35. De Zwarte Zwaan (reedited as #123)
- 36. Het vliegende bed (reedited as #124)
- 37. De Texas-Rakkers (reedited as #125) (B&B: The Texas Rangers)

=== 1960 ===
- 38. De windmakers (reedited as #126)
- 39. De gouden cirkel (reedited as #118)
- 40. De zingende zwammen (reedited as #110)

=== 1961 ===
- 41. De wolkeneters (reedited as #109)
- 42. De sprietatoom (reedition of #3; reedited as #107)
- 43. De klankentapper (reedited as #103)

=== 1962 ===
- 44. De wilde weldoener (reedited as #104)
- 45. Het hondenparadijs (reedited as #98)
- 46. De kaartendans (reedited as #101)

=== 1963 ===
- 47. De Kwakstralen (reedited as #99)
- 48. Het rijmende paard (reedited as #96)
- 49. De sissende sampam (reedited as #94)

=== 1964 ===
- 50. Sjeik El Ro-Jenbiet (reedited as #90)

== Two-coloured (uniform Flemish-Dutch version: 51–66) ==
- 51. De nerveuze Nerviers (reedited as #69)
- 52. De spokenjagers (reedition of #28; reedited as #70)
- 53. Het zoemende ei (reedited as #73)

=== 1965 ===
- 54. De koddige kater (reedited as #74)
- 55. De speelgoedzaaier (reedition of #22; reedited as #91)
- 56. De circusbaron (reedition of #21; reedited as #81)
- 57. De schone slaper (reedited as #85)
- 58. De brullende berg (reedition of #27; reedited as #80)
- 59. De dolle musketiers (reedition of #18; reedited as #89)
- 60. De IJzeren Schelvis (reedition of #23; reedited as #76)
- 61. De apekermis (reedited as #77)
- 62. De stemmenrover (reedition of #30; reedited as #84)

=== 1966 ===
- 63. Jeromba de Griek (reedited as #72)
- 64. De snorrende snor (reedition of #29; reedited as #93)
- 65. De vliegende aap (reedition of #2; reedited as #87)
- 66. De Dulle Griet (reedited as #78)

== Four colours (67–...) ==
=== 1967 ===
- 67. De poenschepper
- 68. Het eiland Amoras (reedition of #1)
- 69. De nerveuze Nerviërs (reedition of #51)
- 70. De spokenjagers (reedition of #28 and #52)
- 71. Wattman
- 72. Jeromba de Griek (reedition of #63)
- 73. Het zoemende ei (reedition of #53)
- 74. De koddige kater (reedition of #54)
- 75. Het mini-mierennest
- 76. De ijzeren schelvis(reedition of #23 and #60)
- 77. De apekermis (reedition of #61)
- 78. De Dulle Griet (reedition of #66)

=== 1968 ===
- 79. De zeven snaren
- 80. De brullende berg (reedition of #27 and #58)
- 81. De circusbaron (reedition of #21 and #56)
- 82. De gramme huurling
- 83. De straatridder (reedition of #25)
- 84. De stemmenrover (reedition of #30 and #62)
- 85. De schone slaper (reedition of #57)
- 86. Tedere Tronica
- 87. De vliegende aap (reedition of #2)

=== 1969 ===
- 88. De tamtamkloppers (reedition of #19)
- 89. De dolle musketiers (reedition of #18 and #59)
- 90. Sjeik El Rojenbiet (reedition of #50)
- 91. De speelgoedzaaier (reedition of #22 and #55)
- 92. De briesende bruid
- 93. De snorrende snor (reedition of #29 and #64)
- 94. De sissende sampan (reedition of #49)
- 95. De kleppende klipper (reedition of #24)
- 96. Het rijmende paard (reedition of #48)
- 97. De junglebloem
- 98. Het hondenparadijs (reedition of #45)
- 99. De kwakstralen (reedition of #47)
- 100. Het gouden paard

=== 1970 ===
- 101. De kaartendans (reedition of #46) (W&W: Dancing Cards)
- 102. De dromendiefstal
- 103. De klankentapper (reedition of #43)
- 104. De wilde weldoener (reedition of #44)
- 105. De koning drinkt (reedition of #4)
- 106. De charmante koffiepot
- 107. De sprietatoom (reedition of #3 and #42)
- 108. Twee toffe totems
- 109. De wolkeneters (reedition of #41)
- 110. De zingende zwammen (reedition of #40)

=== 1971 ===
- 111. De schat van Beersel (reedition of The Blue Series)
- 112. De groene splinter (reedition of The Blue Series)
- 113. Het geheim van de gladiatoren (reedition of The Blue Series)
- 114. De Tartaarse helm (reedition of The Blue Series)
- 115. De gezanten van Mars (reedition of The Blue Series)
- 116. De bronzen sleutel (reedition of The Blue Series)
- 117. De toornige tjiftjaf
- 118. De gouden cirkel (reedition of #39)
- 119. Het sprekende testament (reedition of #32)
- 120. De geverniste zeerovers (reedition of #33)
- 121. De duistere diamant (reedition of #34)
- 122. De kale kapper
- 123. De Zwarte Zwaan (reedition of #35)
- 124. Het vliegende bed (reedition of #36) (B&B: The Flying Bed)
- 125. De Texasrakkers (reedition of #37)
- 126. De windmakers (reedition of #38)

=== 1972 ===
- 127. De Knokkersburcht (reedition of #20)
- 128. Het brommende brons
- 129. Prinses Zagemeel (reedition of #5)
- 130. De steensnoepers
- 131. Het zingende nijlpaard (reedition of #12)
- 132. De stierentemmer (reedition of #10)
- 133. De Tuf-Tuf-club (reedition of #14)
- 134. De witte uil (reedition of #7)
- 135. De gekke gokker
- 136. De bokkerijders (reedition of #26)
- 137. De ringelingschat (reedition of #13)

=== 1973 ===
- 138. Bibbergoud (reedition of #8)
- 139. De boze boomzalver
- 140. De Zwarte Madam (reedition of #6)
- 141. Het bevroren vuur (reedition of #15)
- 142. De mottenvanger (reedition of #31)
- 143. De malle mergpijp
- 144. Lambiorix (reedition of #9)
- 145. De stalen bloempot (reedition of #11)
- 146. De sterrenplukkers (reedition of #16)

=== 1974 ===
- 147. De poppenpakker
- 148. De lachende wolf (reedition of #17)
- 149. De gladde glipper
- 150. Het Spaanse spook (reedition of The Blue Series)
- 151. Het ros Bazhaar
- 152. De bevende baobab

=== 1975 ===
- 153. De nare varaan
- 154. Rikki en Wiske in Chokowakije (reedition of #0: last reedition)
- 155. De poezelige poes
- 156. Beminde Barabas
- 157. De mollige meivis

=== 1976 ===
- 158. De vinnige Viking
- 159. De minilotten van Kokonera
- 160. De bokkige bombardon
- 161. De blinkende boemerang (B&B: The Diamond Boomerang)
- 162. De gouden locomotief

=== 1977 ===
- 163. De vlijtige vlinder
- 164. De raap van Rubens
- 165. De sputterende spuiter
- 166. De maffe maniak

=== 1978 ===
- 167. De zingende kaars
- 168. De Efteling-elfjes (S&S: The Fairies of Efteling)
- 169. De amoureuze amazone
- 170. De olijke olifant

=== 1979 ===
- 171. Walli de walvis
- 172. Het laatste dwaallicht
- 173. Het drijvende dorp
- 174. Het statige standbeeld
- 175. De kadulle Cupido
- 176. De pompenplanters (B&B: The Plunderers)

=== 1980 ===
- 177. De adellijke ark
- 178. De stoute steenezel
- 179. De windbrekers
- 180. Het kregelige Ketje
- 181. De perenprins

=== 1981 ===
- 182. De koperen knullen
- 183. De toffe tamboer
- 184. De Regenboogprinses
- 185. De botte botaknol

=== 1982 ===
- 186. De rosse reus
- 187. De droevige duif
- 188. De snoezige Snowijt/Het vliegende hart
- 189. De Belhamel-bende
- 190. De woelige wadden
- 191. De vergeten vallei/Toffe Tiko

=== 1983 ===
- 192. Het Bretoense broertje
- 193. Hippus het zeeveulen/Het verborgen volk
- 194. De gouden ganzeveer
- 195. De hippe heksen
- 196. De natte Navajo

=== 1984 ===
- 197. Het Delta duel
- 198. De lieve Lilleham
- 199. De tamme Tumi (S&S: The Secret of the Incas)
- 200. Amoris van Amoras

=== 1985 ===
- 201. Het dreigende dinges
- 202. Angst op de "Amsterdam"
- 203. De ruige regen (B&B: The Poisoned Rain)
- 204. De mooie millirem

=== 1986 ===
- 205. De kattige kat
- 206. De bonkige baarden (B&B: Kingdom of the Sea-snails)
- 207. De glanzende gletsjer
- 208. De Hellegathonden

=== 1987 ===
- 209. De kwaaie kwieten
- 210. De jolige joffer
- 211. De woeste wespen
- 212. De edele elfen

=== 1988 ===
- 213. De eenzame eenhoorn
- 214. De parel in de Lotusbloem (W&W: The Jewel in the Lotus)
- 215. De Krimson-crisis
- 216. De wervelende waterzak
- 217. De komieke Coco (B&B: The Amazing Coconut)

=== 1989 ===
- 218. De krachtige krans (S&S: The Circle of Power)
- 219. De speelgoedspiegel
- 220. Sagarmatha (S&S: Sagarmatha)
- 221. De rinoramp (B&B: Rhino Rescue)
- 222. De bezeten bezitter

=== 1990 ===
- 223. De kleurenkladder
- 224. De kleine postruiter
- 225. De goalgetter
- 226. De mysterieuze mijn

=== 1991 ===
- 227. Het Witte Wief
- 228. Het wondere Wolfje
- 229. Tazuur en Tazijn
- 230. Lambik Baba

=== 1992 ===
- 231. De scherpe schorpioen
- 232. De Totootjes
- 233. De klinkende klokken
- 234. Het kristallen kasteel

=== 1993 ===
- 235. De krakende Carcas
- 236. De gulden harpoen
- 237. De snikkende sirene
- 238. De slimme slapjanus

=== 1994 ===
- 239. De stervende ster
- 240. De pottenproever
- 241. Het Aruba-dossier
- 242. Tokapua Toraja

=== 1995 ===
- 243. De averechtse aap
- 244. De begeerde berg
- 245. De 7 schaken
- 246. De vonkende vuurman

=== 1996 ===
- 247. Het kostbare kader
- 248. Robotkop
- 249. De razende race
- 250. Het Grote Gat

=== 1997 ===
- 251. De verraderlijke Vinson
- 252. Volle maan
- 253. Prachtige Pjotr
- 254. Tex en Terry

=== 1998 ===
- 255. De mompelende mummie
- 256. De vogel der goden
- 257. De rebelse Reinaert
- 258. De gevederde slang

=== 1999 ===
- 259. Amber
- 260. De bonte bollen
- 261. Het berenbeklag
- 262. Het enge eiland

=== 2000 ===
- 263. Het verdronken land
- 264. Jeanne Panne
- 265. Papa Razzi
- 266. De kernmonsters
- 267. Lili Natal

=== 2001 ===
- 268. De koeiencommissie
- 269. De stugge Stuyvesant
- 270. De ongelooflijke Thomas
- 271. Big Mother
- 272. De blote belg

=== 2002 ===
- 273. De europummel
- 274. De fleurige Floriade
- 275. Heilig bloed
- 276. In de ban van de Milt
- 277. De verdwenen verteller

=== 2003 ===
- 278. De kunstkraker
- 279. De laatste vloek
- 280. De kus van Odfella
- 281. De gevangene van Prisonov

=== 2004 ===
- 282. De breinbrekers
- 283. Paniek in Palermo
- 284. Kaapse kaalkoppen
- 285. Verraad op de Veluwe

=== 2005 ===
- 286. De flierende fluiter
- 287. De formidabele fantast
- 288. Het slapende goud
- 289. De kaduke klonen

=== 2006 ===
- 290. De blikken blutser & Het mopperende masker (two short stories that were published earlier in magazines were compiled)
- 291. De bangeschieters
- 292. De Nachtwachtbrigade
- 293. De kaperkoters

=== 2007 ===
- 294. De tikkende tinkan
- 295. De krasse krokoman
- 296. De curieuze neuzen (first book to come with a brand-new look for the front cover)
- 297. De joviale Gille
- 298. De elfstedenstunt

=== 2008 ===
- 299. Het babbelende bad
- 300. Het machtige monument
- 301. De dartele draak
- 302. De sterrensteen

=== 2009 ===
- 303. De knikkende knoken
- 304. De jokkende joker
- 305. De tijdbobijn
- 306. De stralende staf

=== 2010 ===
- 307. De rillende rots
- 308. De gamegoeroe
- 309. De watersater
- 310. De halve Havelaar
- 311. De stuivende stad

=== 2011 ===
- 312. De zappende ziel
- 313. De kwakende Queen
- 314. Het lijdende leiden
- 315. De bananenzangers

=== 2012 ===
- 316. Krimsonia
- 317. Het bizarre blok
- 318. De suikerslaven
- 319. Suske de rat
- 320. De tirannieke tor

=== 2013 ===
- 321. Het ijzeren duel
- 322. De vliegende rivier
- 323. Barabas de Balorige
- 324. De royale ruiter

=== 2014 ===
- 325. Het schrikkelspook
- 326. De zwarte tulp
- 327. Het gebroken dorp
- 328. Sterrenrood

=== 2015 ===
- 329. Suskewiet
- 330. De fabuleuze freak
- 331. Sooi and Sientje
- 332. Het verloren verleden

=== 2016 ===
- 333. De bangelijke Bosch
- 334. Taxi Tata / Expeditie Robikson
- 335. Het lederen monster
- 336. Het omgekeerde land
- 337. Game of drones

=== 2017 ===
- 338. De heldenmaker
- 339. De planeetvreter (first book in the brand-new A4 series)
- 340. Mami Wata
- 341. Het monamysterie
- 342. De zwarte zwevers

=== 2018 ===
- 343. SOS Snowbell
- 344. BRBS 2.0
- 345. Operatie Siggy
- 346. Chronos en Chaos

=== 2019 ===
- 347. Lambik Plastiek
- 348. De wrede wensput
- 349. Het lekkere labo
- 350. Nacht van de narwal

=== 2020 ===
- 351. De verloren Van Eyck
- 352. Team Krimson
- 353. Het gewiste Wiske
- 354. De zwijgende Zwollem
- 355. De scheve Schot

=== 2021 ===
- 356. De fluitende olifant
- 357. De zalige ziener
- 358. De drakenprinter
- 359. De naamloze negen
- 360. De drijvende dokters

=== 2022 ===
- 361. De grot van Gregorius
- 362. De kale kroon
- 363. De maffe markies
- 364. De gulden krijger
- 365. De boze boleet

=== 2023 ===
- 366. De geplaagde Plantijn
- 367. De harteloze Hein
- 368. De Rookburgh rookies
- 369. De boterhammenman
- 370. De krijtkampioen
- 371. De zoevende zusters

=== 2024 ===
- 372. Bolhoed Bik
- 373. Klaartje Wakker
- 374. De Keizerkop
- 375. De schakende schim
- 376. De boekenduikers

=== 2025 ===
- 377. De stenen samoerai
- 378. Het ware witje
- 379. Het hondenhart
- 380. De correcte Krimson
- 381. Het geweven geheim

=== 2026 ===
- 382. Het wonderwater
- 383. De zwijgende lier
- 384. Het laaste lint
- 385. De duistere ziel
- 386. De bittere band

== See also ==
- The Blue Series
- List of Spike and Suzy books in English
- List of Suske en Wiske albums
- Spike and Suzy
- Willy Vandersteen
- Ligne claire
