= The Blue Series =

The Blue Series is the name of one of the series' of the Suske en Wiske books, written by Willy Vandersteen. The Blue Series is shorter than the other two series - The Red Series and the "specials" - but is possibly the most popular. The Blue series is so called because the covers of the books were blue.

Cover to Het geheim der gladiatoren, released in 1955

== History of the series ==
In the 1950s, the Franco-Belgian comics magazine Tintin had a good following in France and Wallonia (the French speaking part of Belgium). However, the sister publication Kuifje, aimed at the Dutch speaking part of Belgium, suffered in comparison. So they brought in a Dutch-speaking cartoonist - Willy Vandersteen. In Tintin, he created 6 stories from 1952 to 1957. Hergé taught Vandersteen to draw in the ligne claire style, so these 6 stories were Vandersteen's first works drawn in the ligne claire style. It was decided that when these stories were published as books they would have blue covers to distinguish them from the earlier books with red covers. When Vandersteen left the magazine, he continued his stories, but they were again released with red covers.

== Bibliography ==
- Het Spaanse spook (The Spanish Spook)
- De bronzen sleutel (The Bronze Key)
- De Tartaarse helm (The Tartar Helmet)
- De schat van Beersel (The Treasure of Beersel)
- Het geheim der gladiatoren (The Gladiators' Secret)
- De gezanten van Mars (The Martian Ambassadors)
- De groene splinter (The Green Splinter)

== See also ==
- The Red Series
- List of Suske en Wiske books in English
- List of Suske en Wiske albums
- Suske en Wiske
- Willy Vandersteen
- Ligne claire
