= Amsterdam (1748 ship) =

18th-century cargo ship of the Dutch East India Company

Coordinates: 50°50′48.83644″N 0°31′27.40984″E

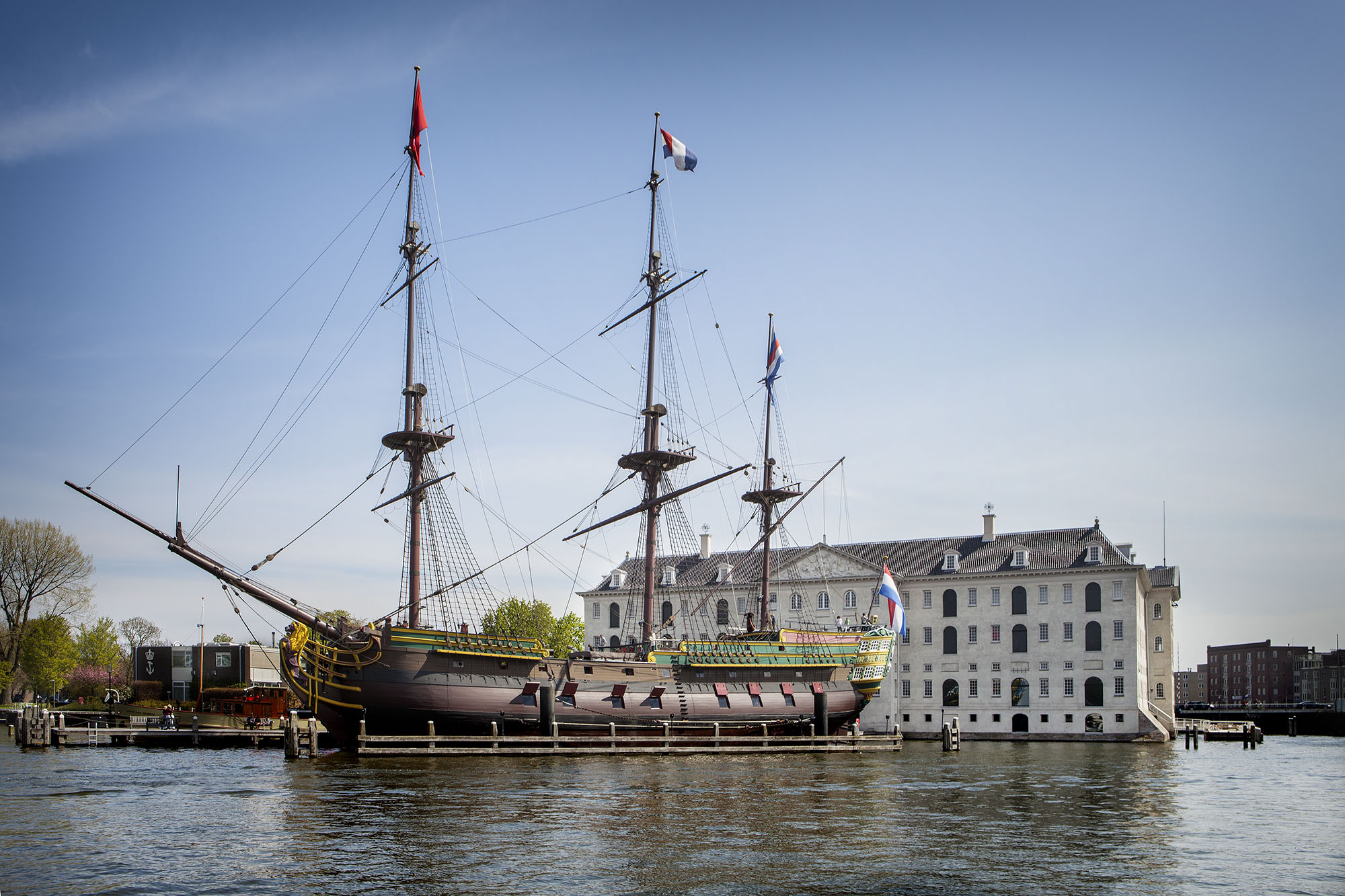
- The 1990 ship replica of the Amsterdam in front of the Netherlands Maritime Museum in Amsterdam

History

Dutch Republic
- Name: Amsterdam
- Namesake: The city of Amsterdam
- Owner: Dutch East India Company; Chamber of Amsterdam
- Completed: 1748
- Maiden voyage: Texel–Batavia
- Fate: Wrecked in a storm in the English Channel on 26 January 1749

General characteristics
- Type: East Indiaman
- Displacement: 1,100 tons
- Length: 48.0 m (157 ft 6 in)
- Beam: 11.5 m (37 ft 9 in)
- Height: 56.0 m (183 ft 9 in)
- Draught: 5.5 m (18 ft 1 in)
- Armament: 42 guns

Amsterdam (Dutch pronunciation: [ˌɑmstərˈdɑm]) was an 18th-century cargo ship of the Dutch East India Company (Dutch: Vereenigde Oost-Indische Compagnie; VOC). The ship started its maiden voyage from Texel to Batavia on 8 January 1749, but was wrecked in a storm on the English Channel on 26 January 1749. The shipwreck was discovered in 1969 in the bay of Bulverhythe, near Hastings on the English south coast, and is sometimes visible during low tides. The location was found by Bill Young, the site agent/project manager for the sewage outfall being built by the William Press Group. With time on his hands during the long stay away from home, he followed up the rumour of the going aground. He was castigated by the Museum of London for scooping out the interior of the bow with a digger as it could have led to the structure collapsing. However, it uncovered the initial items which led to a more extensive excavation of the cargo which reflected life at the time. The wreck is a Protected Wreck managed by Historic England. Some of the findings from the site are in The Shipwreck Museum in Hastings. A replica of the ship is on display in Amsterdam.

== Ship ==
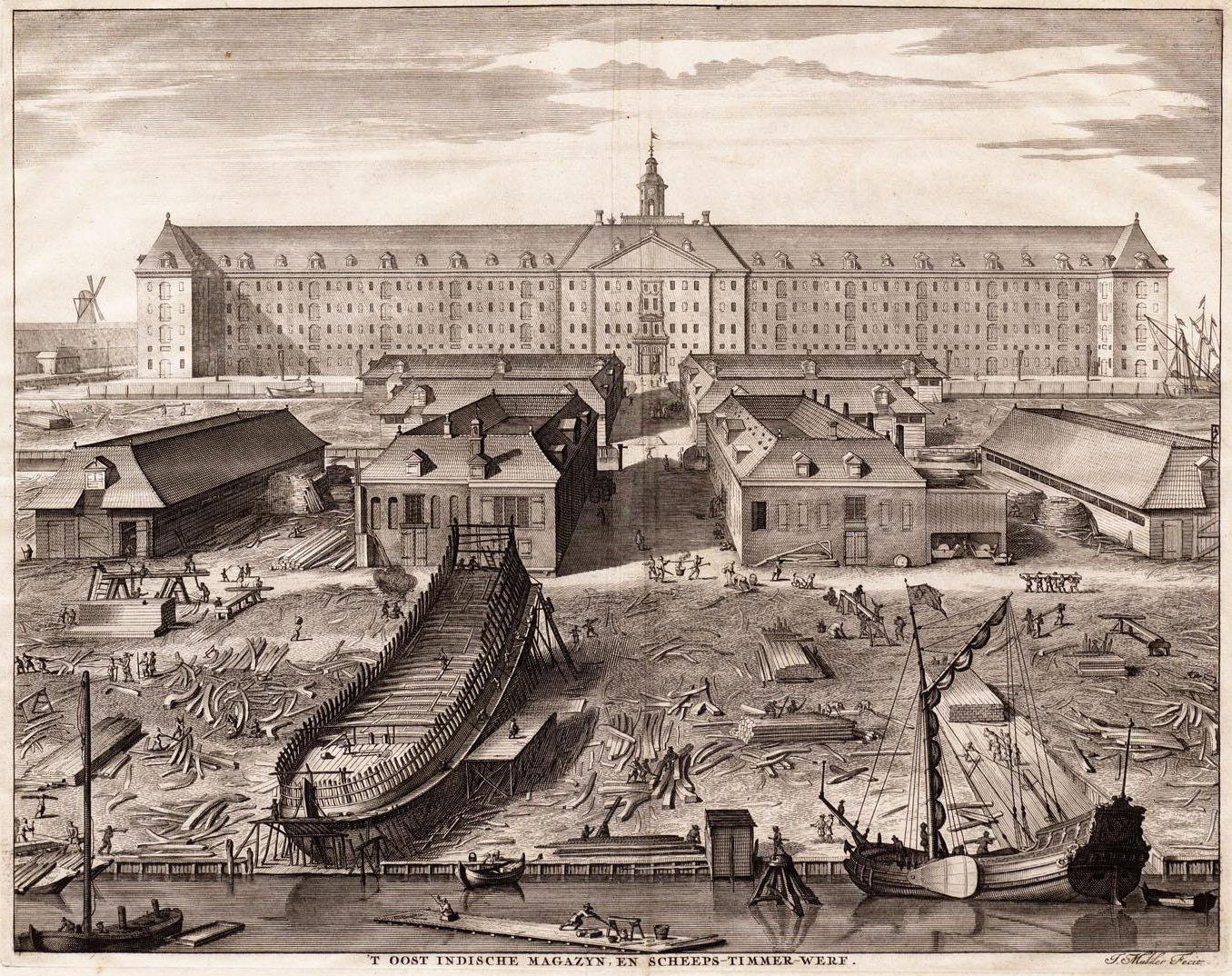
The shipyard of the Dutch East India Company in Amsterdam around 1750

The Amsterdam was a Dutch "Transom Return Ship" (Dutch: Spiegelretourschip) built as an East Indiaman for transport between the Dutch Republic and the settlements and strongholds of the Dutch East India Company in the East Indies. On an outward voyage these ships carried guns and bricks for the settlements and strongholds, and silver and golden coins to purchase Asian goods. On a return journey the ships carried the goods that were purchased, such as spices, fabrics, and china. In both directions the ships carried victuals, clothes, and tools for the sailors and soldiers on the ship. On an outward voyage of eight months, the ships were populated by around 240 men, and on a return journey by around 70.

The Amsterdam was built in the shipyard for the Amsterdam chamber of the Dutch East India Company in Amsterdam. The ship was made of oak wood.

== Maiden voyage ==
The maiden voyage of the Amsterdam was planned from the Dutch island Texel to the settlement Batavia in the East Indies. The ship, commanded by the 33-year-old captain Willem Klump, had 203 crew, 127 soldiers, and 5 passengers. The Amsterdam was laden with textiles, wine, stone ballast, cannon, paper, pens, pipes, domestic goods and 27 chests of silver guilder coins. The ship's entire cargo would be worth several million euros in modern currency.

On 15 November 1748 the ship made its first attempt but returned on 19 November 1748 due to an adverse wind. The ship made a second attempt on 21 November 1748, which also failed and from which the ship returned on 6 December 1748. The third attempt was made on 8 January 1749. The Amsterdam had problems in the English Channel tacking into a strong westerly storm. For many days she got no further than Beachy Head near Eastbourne. An epidemic appeared amongst the crew and a mutiny broke out. Finally the rudder broke off and the ship, helpless in a storm, grounded in the mud and sand in the bay of Bulverhythe on 26 January 1749, 5 km (3.1 mi) to the west of Hastings.

She began to sink into the mud, where much of the keel remains today, perfectly preserved. Some of the cargo, including silver coinage, was removed for safekeeping by local authorities. There was an outbreak of fighting between scavengers and British troops had to be called in to bring the situation to order. The crew were looked after locally before being returned to Dutch soil.

== Shipwreck ==
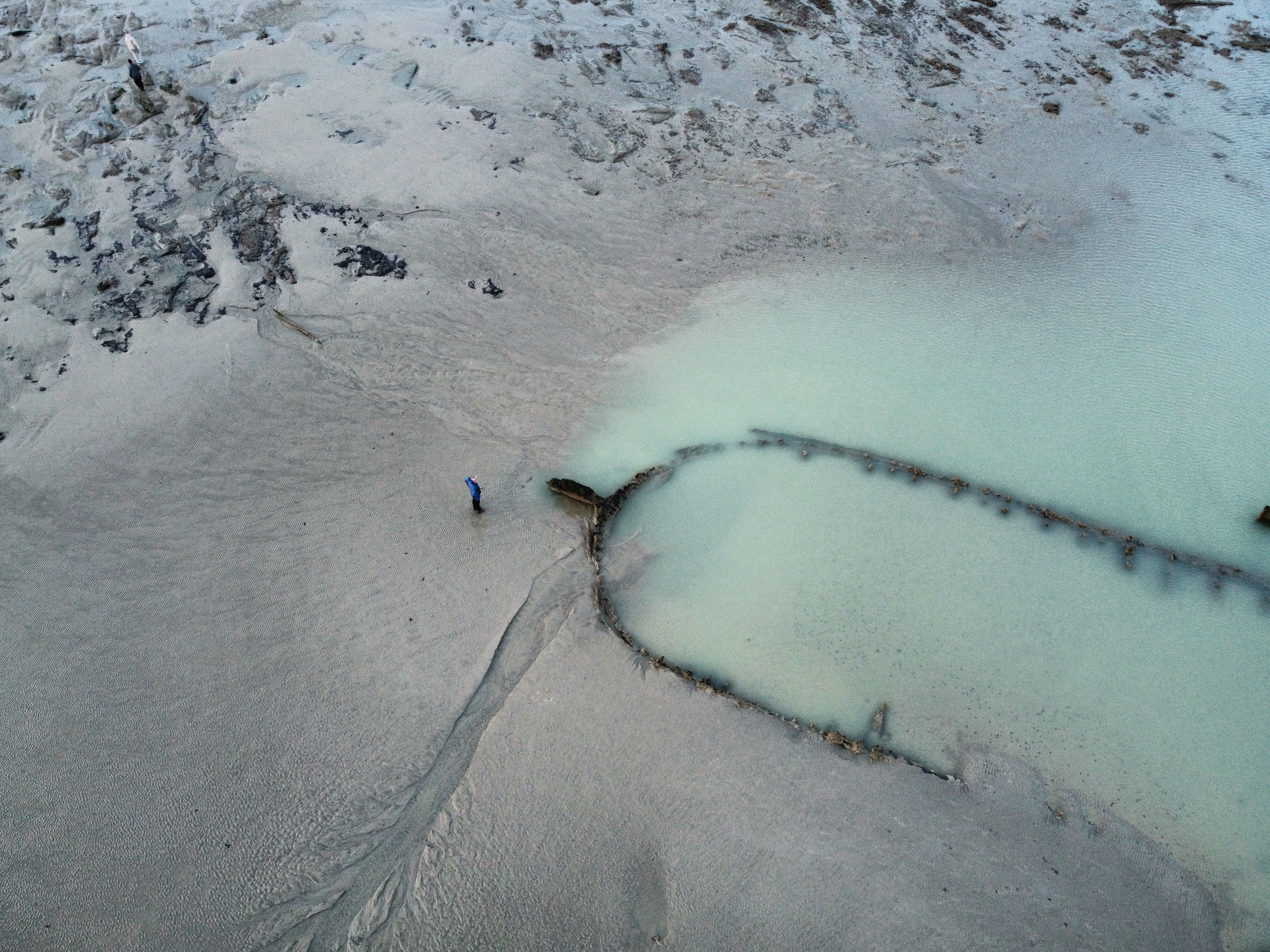
Aerial view of the wreck of the VOC ship Amsterdam at low tide.

In 1969, the Amsterdam was discovered after being exposed by a low spring tide. It is the best-preserved VOC ship ever found. Archaeologist Peter Marsden did the first surveying of the wreck, and he advised further excavation.

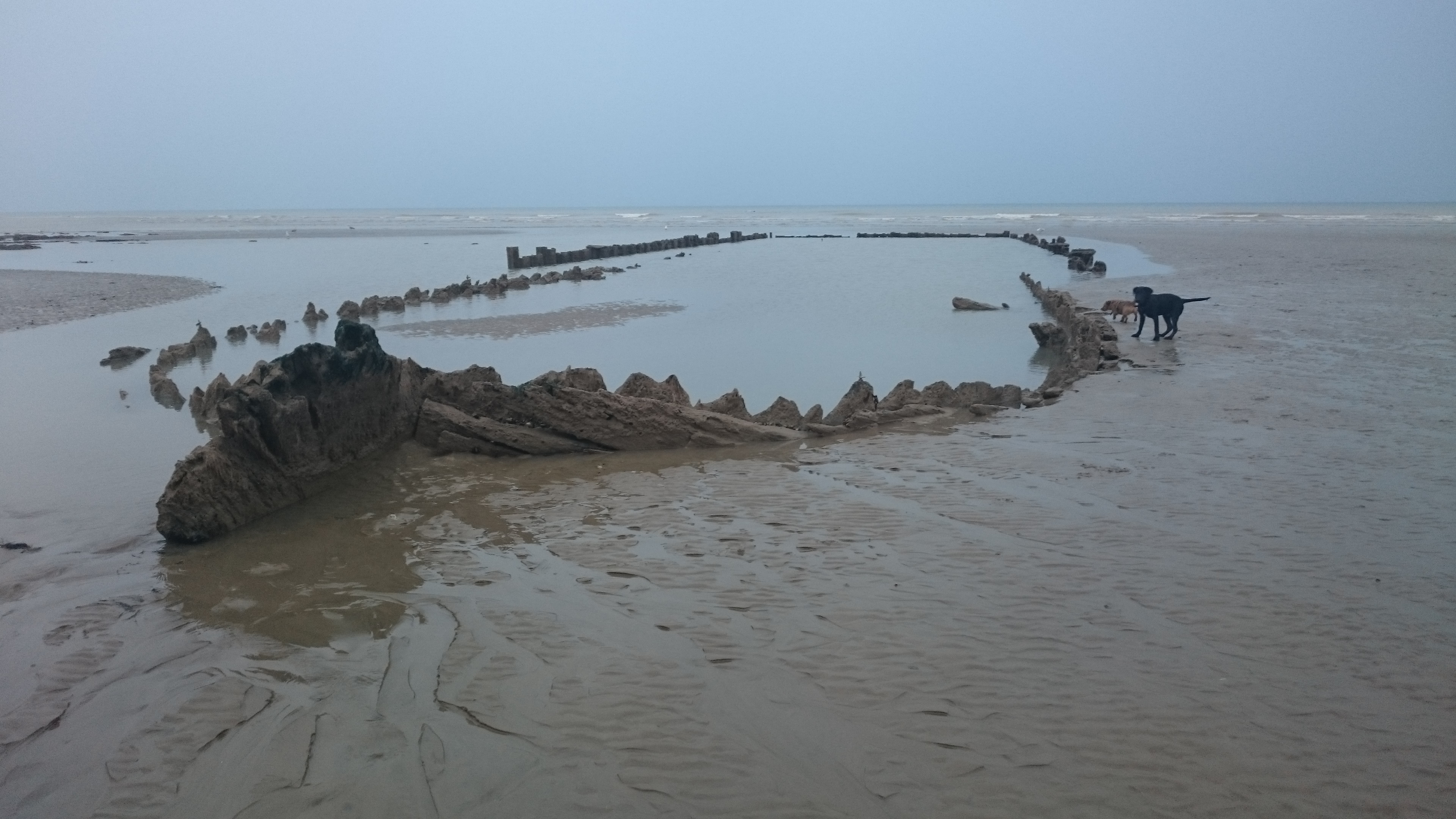
The VOC Amsterdam as visible at very low tide.

The wrecksite was designated under the Protection of Wrecks Act on 5 February 1974.

The VOC Ship Amsterdam Foundation started researching the wreck, followed by major excavations in 1984, 1985 and 1986, during which huge numbers of artefacts were found. Although the wreck is submerged in the sand and mud of the beach (and is even visible at very low tides), much of the excavation was done by divers, for whom a small tower was constructed near the wreck. Additionally the wreck was surrounded by an iron girder frame. The archeological output was so dense that new ways of researching needed to be developed, all of which were needed to understand the technological, socio-economic and cultural features of the VOC. Some of the finds are on show at the Shipwreck Museum in Hastings, East Sussex, UK, including one of the anchors, the other being on display as public art at St Katharine Docks in London. The wreck is protected and diving on it or removing timbers or any artefacts is forbidden. The ship may be visited as the timbers are exposed at very low tides in the sand just opposite the footbridge over the railway line at Bulverhythe.

== Ship replica ==
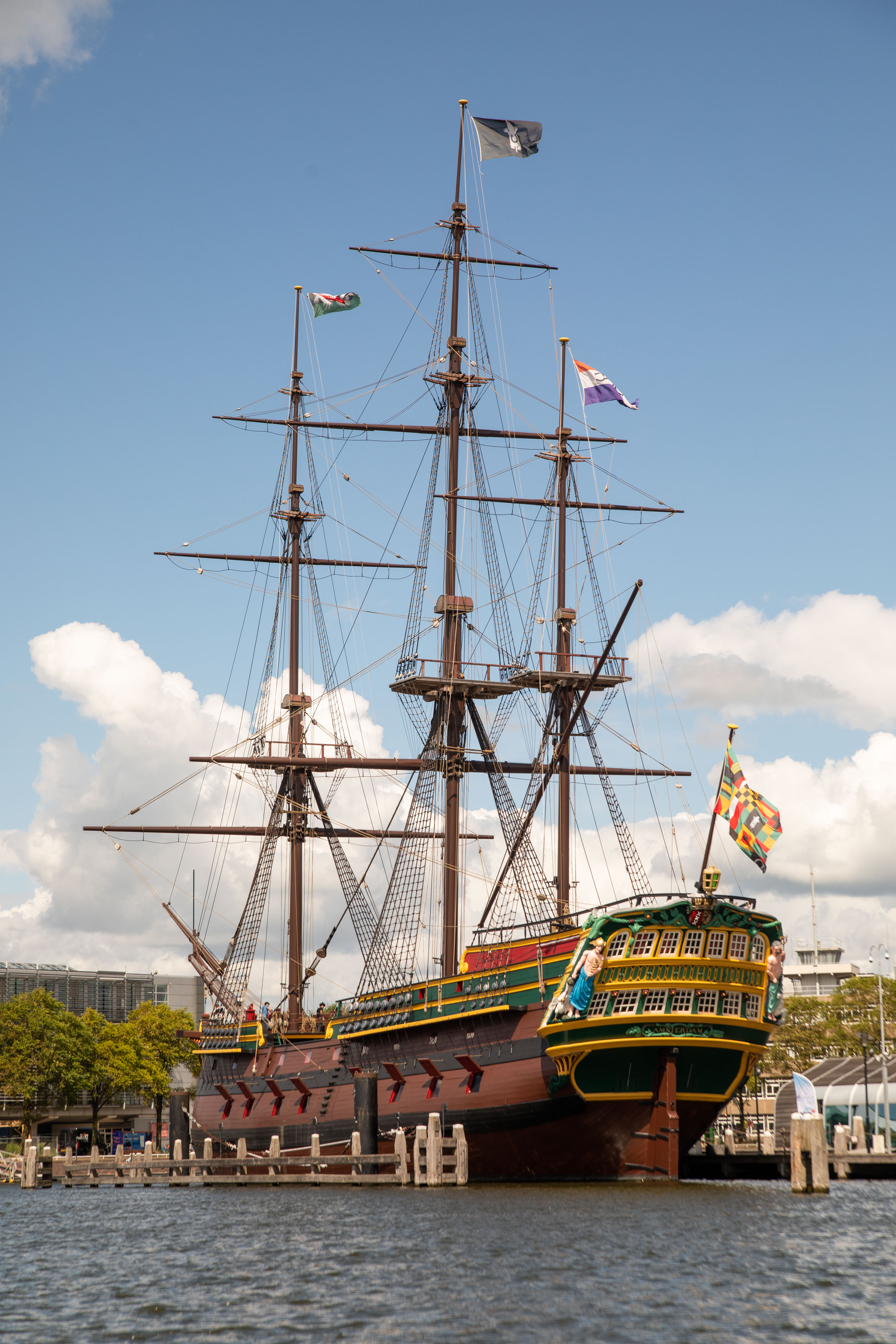
The ship replica of the Amsterdam seen from the back

A replica of the ship was built in Iroko wood by 300 volunteers using modern tools as well as tools of the period, between 1985 and 1990 at the Zouthaven (now Piet Heinkade), Amsterdam. It is moored next to the Netherlands Maritime Museum, where it is open to visitors of the museum (which has now reopened after being closed for several years for renovations).

As for the original ship, there had been hopes in the 1980s that the Dutch Government, which still owns it, might excavate the whole wreck and return it for restoration and display in Amsterdam, like the Regalskeppet Vasa in Sweden, or the Mary Rose in Portsmouth, but the funds were not forthcoming. Several decks and much of the bowsprit lie submerged in the mud and are in remarkably good condition, being naturally preserved by the mud, and much of the cargo is still aboard.

== Popular culture ==
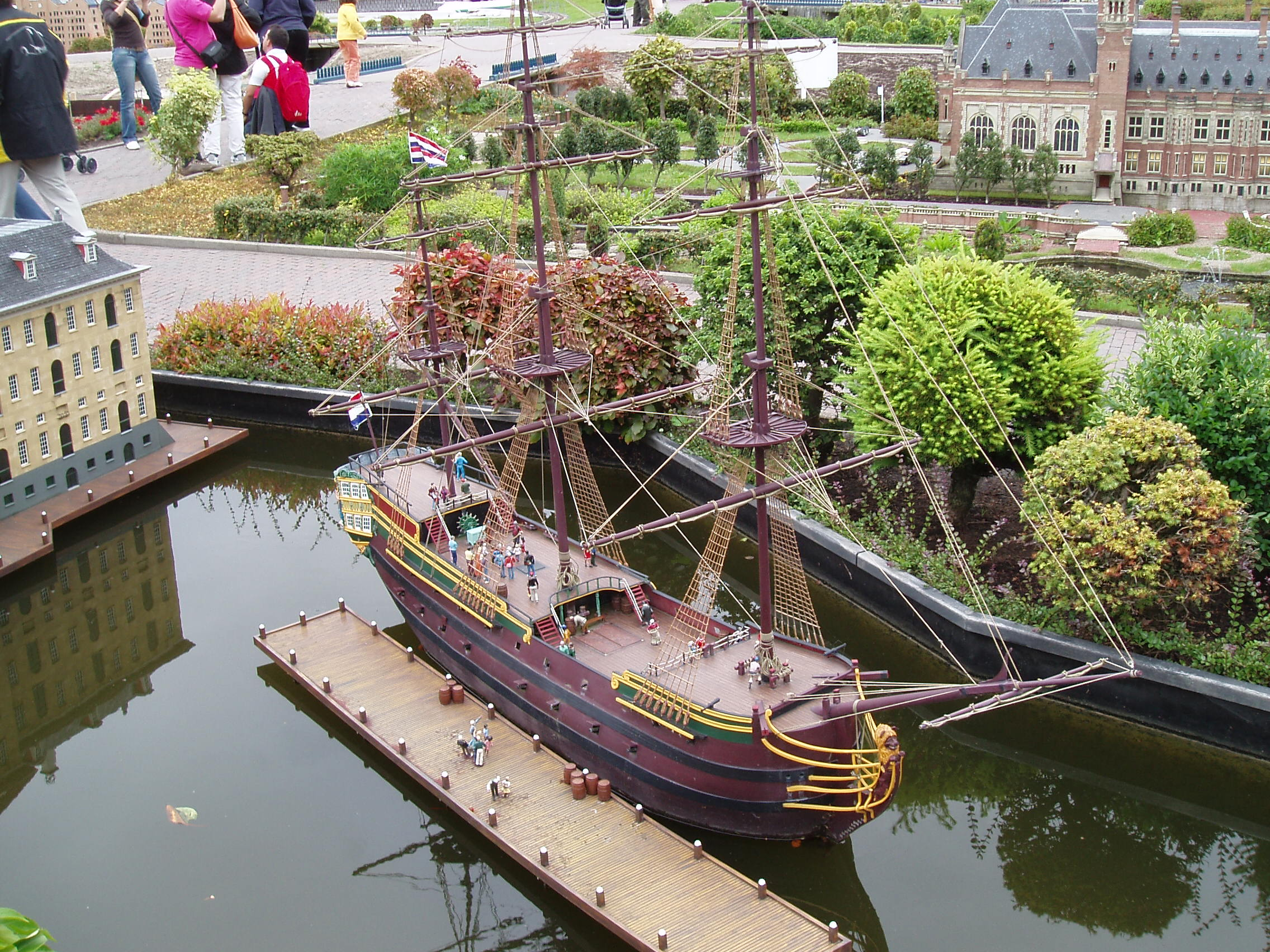
Scale model of the Amsterdam in Madurodam in The Hague

The comic book Angst op de "Amsterdam" of Spike and Suzy is about the Amsterdam. The book was published in 1985 in The Red Series of Spike and Suzy.

In the miniature park Madurodam in The Hague is a model of the Amsterdam on a scale of 1:25. The Amsterdam Museum also has a wooden model of the ship with to the side a 'Camel' lifting mechanism.

Shanty Punk band Skinny Lister, some of whom live in Hastings, released a single "Damn the Amsterdam" about the ship.
