= Shipwreck Museum =

British charitable museum

Coordinates: 50.8561°N 0.5956°E

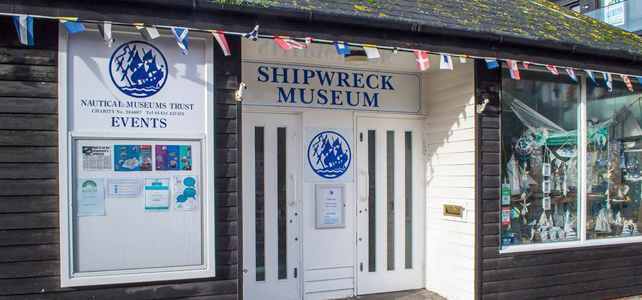
Entrance to The Shipwreck Museum Hastings

The Shipwreck Museum is an independent charitable museum in the historic Old Town of Hastings, UK. The museum has artefacts from many ships wrecked in the English Channel from the Goodwin Sands in Kent to Pevensey Bay in East Sussex, including the Amsterdam, a Dutch East Indiaman of 1749, and the Anne of 1690, a warship of Charles II. There are also exhibits of fossils found in the local area.
