= 's Lands Zeemagazijn =

17th-century building in Amsterdam

Coordinates: 52.3717°N 4.9148°E

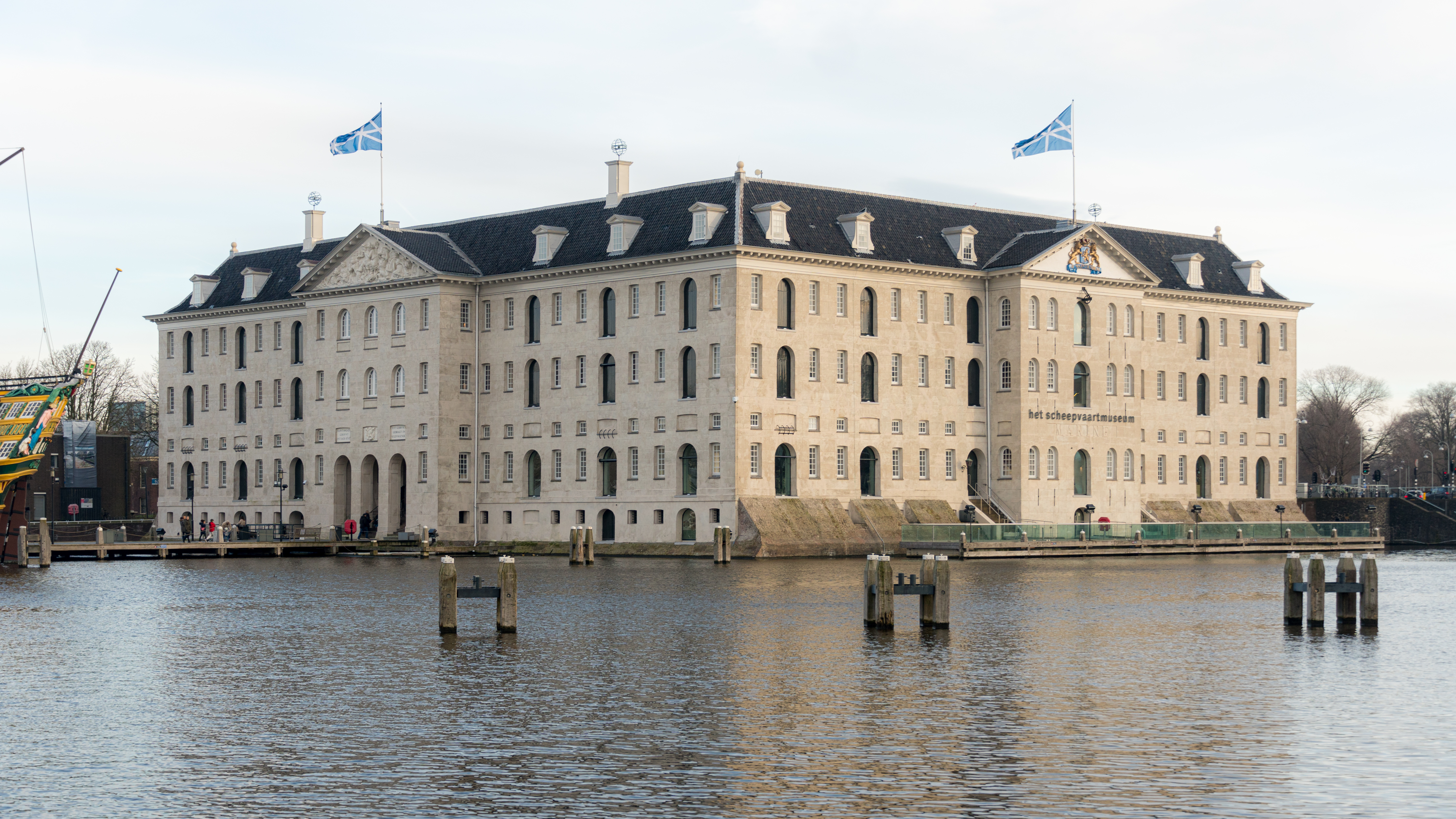
's Lands Zeemagazijn as seen from the west

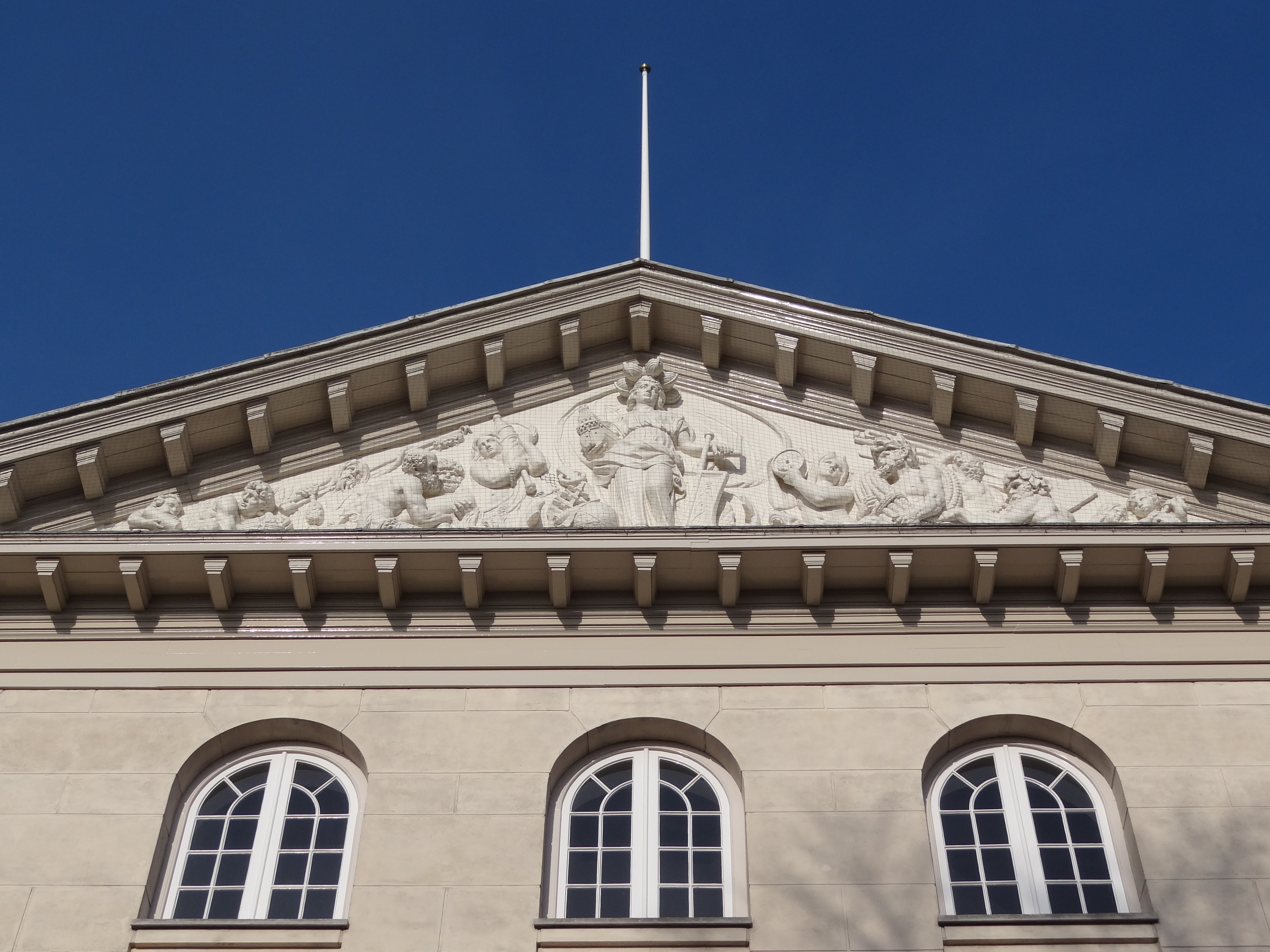

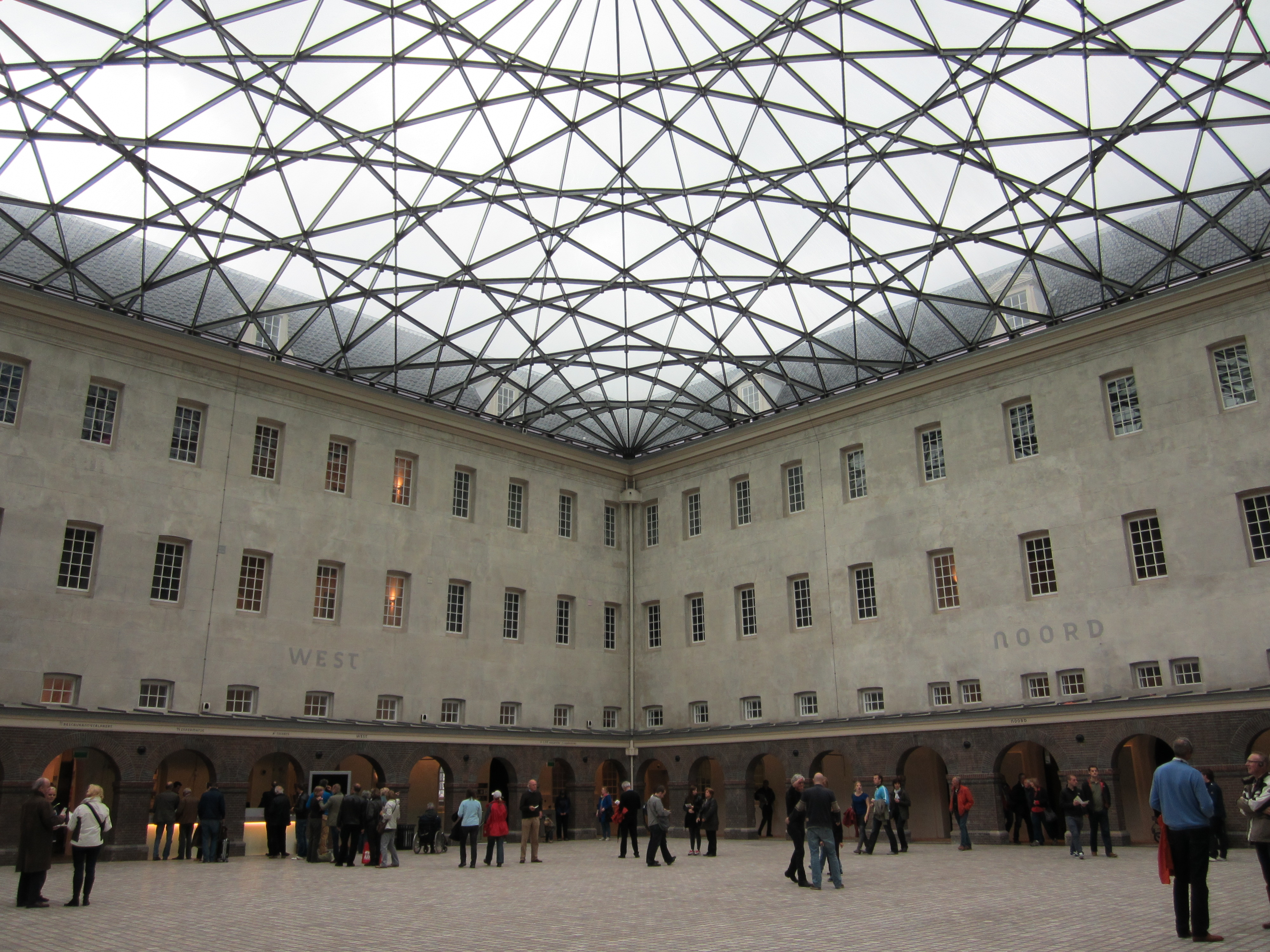
Interior

's Lands Zeemagazijn ("National Sea Arsenal") is a 17th-century building in the Oosterdok near Kattenburgerplein in Amsterdam, the Netherlands, which served as arsenal of the Admiralty of Amsterdam. Designed by Daniël Stalpaert and constructed in 1655/1656, it is an example of Dutch Baroque architecture. Since 1973, the building has housed the National Maritime Museum.

== Admiralty ==
In 1650, the government of Amsterdam decided to build three islands on the eastern edge of the city. The wharf for the navy was to be placed on the westernmost island, Kattenburg. A few years later this became the building site of the arsenal. Construction started in 1655 after the Dutch lost the First Anglo-Dutch War and there was a dire need to professionalize the navy in order to protect the merchant fleet.

The foundation of the building consists of 2300 wooden piles from Oslo, and the building itself is constructed entirely out of brick. Two years after its completion, in 1658, Joost van den Vondel dedicated a poem to the Zeemagazijn.

During the first half of the eighteenth century, the admiralty noticed that the building was slowly sinking into the ground, a common problem with building projects in Amsterdam. Some construction errors during the laying of the foundation plus the weight of the building and the peat soil of Amsterdam combined in a hazardous situation. To stop this from happening, buttresses were added to the base of the building and an avant-corps was constructed on four sides of the building.

In 1791, a great fire broke out and charred the entire building. Instead of demolishing it and constructing a new arsenal in its place, the decision was made to plaster the building to imitate sandstone, creating the distinctive white look it has today. After the French invasion in 1795, the Dutch Admiralty was disbanded and a national navy was formed; the function of the arsenal changed as well. It no longer stored cannons, ropes and gunpowder but clothing and food. After the French left, the building was given to the newly formed Dutch navy and stayed in the navy's control until 1973.

== Dutch Maritime Museum ==
In 1972, it was announced that the building would become the location of the Nederlands Scheepvaartmuseum (English: Dutch Maritime Museum), as the navy saw no more use for the building, and the Maritime Museum needed a larger building to display their various objects. After moving the collection of the museum from the Cornelis Schuytstraat in the southern part of Amsterdam to the Zeemagazijn, the museum was officially opened by Princess Beatrix on April 13, 1973.

A new renovation project was planned to take place from 2007 to 2011. On October 1, the Maritime Museum was reopened by Queen Beatrix. New additions to the building are the glass and steel roof, designed by Laurent Ney and based upon the lines of a compass on sea charts. In total it weighs 200,000 kilos (160,000 kilos steel and 40,000 kilos glass). Because the building is slanted (an effect from the sinking in the 18th century), every piece of glass had to be cut individually.
