= List of Suske en Wiske stories =

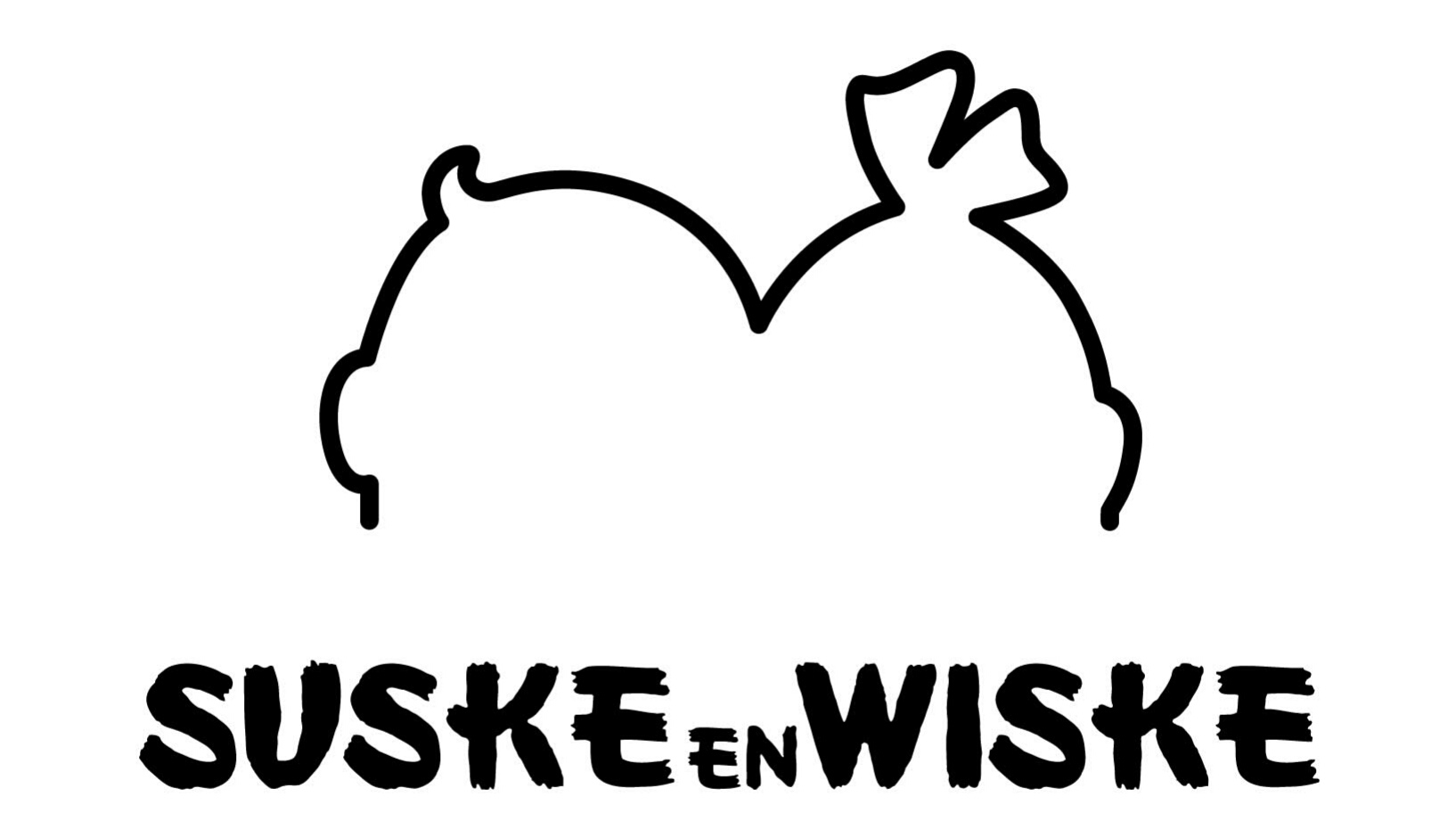

This is a chronological list of Suske en Wiske albums, known in English as Spike and Suzy. The dates refer to the dates the albums first appeared in print. The first column gives the order in which the albums were originally published, and the other columns give the other series.

1. FU - Flemish uncolored series (1946-1959)

2. BS - Blue series (1952-1957)

3. DU - Dutch uncolored series (1953 - 1959)

4. FT - Flemish two-colored series (1959 - 1964)

5. DT - Dutch two-colored series (1959 - 1964)

6. JT - Joint two-colored series (1964 - 1966)

7. FC - Four-colored series (1967–present)

8. SC - Strip Classic series (1981 - 1984)

9. RC - Red Classic series (1993 - 1999)

10. PS - Pocket Series (2007–present)

Number	Date	Title	FU	BS	DU	FT	DT	JT	FC	SC	RC	PS
1	30-03-1945	Rikki en Wiske (in Chocowakije)	0						154		1	
2	19-12-1945	(Op) Het eiland Amoras	1		1a				68	2	2	
3	15-05-1946	De sprietatoom	3			42	31		107	4	3	
4	28-09-1946	De vliegende aap	2					65	87	3	4	
5	13-02-1947	De zwarte madam	6						140	8	5	22
6	01-07-1947	De koning drinkt	4						105	5	6	17
7	08-11-1947	Prinses Zagemeel	5						129	6	7	
8	20-03-1948	De bokkerijders	26						136		8	9
9	29-07-1948	De witte uil	7						134	13	9	
10	09-09-1948	Het Spaanse spook		0					150			
11	31-10-1948	De gekalibreerde kwibus								1	10	
12	08-12-1948	De mottenvanger	31						142		11	16
13	16-04-1949	Bibbergoud	8		1				138	14	12	20
14	25-08-1949	Lambiorix	9		3				144	19	13	23
15	05-01-1950	De stierentemmer	10		7				132		14	
16	02-03-1950	De bronzen sleutel		1					116			
17	16-05-1950	De stalen bloempot	11						145		15	
18	23-09-1950	Het zingende nijlpaard	12		4				131		16	26
19	02-02-1951	De ringelingschat	13		8	7	8		137		17	23
20	09-05-1951	De Tartaarse helm		2					114			
21	13-06-1951	De tuf-tuf-club	14		5				133		18	
22	29-10-1951	Het bevroren vuur	15		2				141		19	
23	10-03-1952	De sterrenplukkers	16		6				146		20	31
24	19-07-1952	De lachende wolf	17						148		21	
25	23-07-1952	De schat van Beersel		3					111			
26	26-11-1952	De dolle musketiers	18		9			59	89		22	32
27	14-12-1952	Het vliegende hart							188		23	
28	07-04-1953	De tamtamkloppers	19		10	19	10		88		24	
29	18-08-1953	De knokkersburcht	20		11	20	11		127		25	32
30	14-10-1953	Het geheim van de gladiatoren		4					113			15
31	31-12-1953	De circusbaron	21		12			56	81		26	
32	15-05-1954	De speelgoedzaaier	22		13			55	91		27	
33	27-09-1954	De ijzeren schelvis	23		14			60	76		28	27
34	02-02-1955	De gezanten van Mars		5					115			30
35	11-02-1955	De kleppende klipper	24		15				95		29	19
36	02-07-1955	De straatridder	25		16				83		30	28
37	17-11-1955	De brullende berg	27		17			58	80		31	10
38	31-03-1956	De spokenjagers	28		18			52	70		32	22
39	27-06-1956	De groene splinter		6					112			15
40	08-09-1956	De snorrende snor	29		19			64	93		33	
41	21-01-1957	De stemmenrover	30		20			62	84		34	16
42	04-06-1957	Het sprekende testament	32		21	32	21		119		35	
43	16-10-1957	De geverniste zeerovers	33		22	33	22		120		36	13
44	1957	De rammelende rally										
45	26-02-1958	Het gouden paard		7					100			18
46	28-02-1958	De duistere diamant	34		23	34	23		121		37	
47	14-07-1958	De zwarte zwaan	35			35	26		123		38	
48	27-11-1958	Het vliegende bed				36	24		124		39	
49	13-04-1959	De Texasrakkers				37	25		125		40	21
50	22-08-1959	De windmakers				38	27		126		41	
51	04-01-1960	De gouden cirkel				39	28		118		42	20
52	18-05-1960	De zingende zwammen				40	29		110		43	26
53	28-09-1960	De wolkeneters				41	30		109		44	30
54	07-02-1961	De klankentapper				43	32		103		45	
55	19-06-1961	De wilde weldoener				44	33		104		46	28
56	26-10-1961	Het hondenparadijs				45	34		98		47	14
57	07-03-1962	De kaartendans				46	35		101		48	
58	14-07-1962	De kwakstralen				47	36		99		49	30
59	22-11-1962	Het rijmende paard				48	37		96		50	18
60	02-04-1963	De sissende sampan				49	38		94		51	19
61	12-08-1963	Sjeik El Rojenbiet				50	39		90		52	17
62	21-12-1963	De nerveuze Nerviërs						51	69		53	23
63	02-05-1964	Het zoemende ei						53	73		54	
64	11-09-1964	De koddige kater						54	74		55	
65	23-01-1965	De schone slaper						57	85		56	8
66	02-06-1965	De apekermis						61	77		57	7
67	11-10-1965	Jeromba de Griek						63	72		58	32
68	22-02-1966	De dulle griet						66	78		59	
69	02-07-1966	De poenschepper							67			
70	12-11-1966	Wattman							71			28
71	24-03-1967	Het mini-mierennest							75			29
72	05-08-1967	De zeven snaren							79			
73	16-12-1967	De gramme huurling							82			
74	27-04-1968	Tedere Tronica							86			
75	09-09-1968	De briesende bruid							92			
76	18-01-1969	De junglebloem							97			29
77	03-06-1969	De dromendiefstal							102			16
78	11-10-1969	De charmante koffiepot							106			
79	20-02-1970	Twee toffe totems							108			
80	04-07-1970	De toornige tjiftjaf							117			12
81	13-11-1970	De kale kapper							122			29
82	31-03-1971	Het brommende brons							128			25
83	13-08-1971	De steensnoepers							130			24
84	28-12-1971	De gekke gokker							135			
85	09-05-1972	De boze boomzalver							139			6
86	20-09-1972	De malle mergpijp							143			15
87	03-02-1973	De poppenpakker							147			13
88	31-03-1973	De bevende Baobab							152			33
89	18-06-1973	De gladde glipper							149			
90	31-10-1973	Het ros Bazhaar							151			18
91	12-1973	De snoezige Snowijt							188			
92	13-03-1974	De nare varaan							153			
93	27-04-1974	De mollige meivis							157			
94	06-1974	De vergeten vallei							191			
95	25-07-1974	De poezelige poes							155			
96	05-12-1974	Beminde Barabas							156			11
97	01-1975	Toffe Tiko							191			
98	01-1975	De gouden bloem										
99	17-04-1975	De vinnige Viking							158			
100	17-05-1975	De vlijtige vlinder							163			12
101	06-1975	Hippus het zeeveulen							193			
102	01-09-1975	De bokkige bombardon							160			
103	06-10-1975	De minilotten van Kokonera							159			24
104	01-12-1975	De gouden locomotief							162			21
105	1975	De vliegende klomp										
106	13-01-1976	De blinkende boemerang							161			
107	09-02-1976	De zingende kaars							167			26
108	14-04-1976	Het laatste dwaallicht							172			
109	24-05-1976	De raap van Rubens							164			
110	06-1976	Het verborgen volk							193			
111	05-06-1976	De maffe maniak							166			
112	10-07-1976	De regenboogprinses							184			
113	06-10-1976	De windbrekers							179			
114	30-11-1976	De sputterende spuiter							165			
115	12-04-1977	De Efteling-elfjes							168			
116	25-06-1977	De olijke olifant							170			14
117	01-07-1977	De lollige lakens										
118	24-08-1977	De amoureuze amazone							169			11
119	05-01-1978	Walli de walvis							171			
120	04-1978	Het monster van Loch Ness										
121	19-05-1978	Het drijvende dorp							173			
122	01-06-1978	Het geheim van de Kalmthoutse heide										
123	15-07-1978	De kadulle Cupido							175			11
124	28-09-1978	Het statige standbeeld							174			25
125	09-02-1979	De pompenplanters							176			
126	01-06-1979	De witte gems										
127	23-06-1979	De adellijke ark							177			
128	30-07-1979	Het kregelige ketje							180			25
129	03-11-1979	De stoute steenezel							178			
130	13-03-1980	De perenprins							181			17
131	01-06-1980	Het verloren zwaard										
132	26-07-1980	De koperen knullen							182			24
133	18-08-1980	De botte botaknol							185			33
134	06-12-1980	De toffe tamboer							183			
135	17-04-1981	De rosse reus							186			
136	01-06-1981	De stenen broden										
137	31-08-1981	De droevige duif							187			12
138	07-09-1981	De woelige wadden							190			27
139	1981	De zilveren appels										
140	12-01-1982	De belhamel-bende							189			31
141	01-04-1982	De blijde broodeters										
142	24-05-1982	Het Bretoense broertje							192			
143	06-1982	Het onbekende eiland										
144	27-09-1982	De natte Navajo							196			
145	02-10-1982	De gouden ganzeveer							194			20
146	1982	Een bij voor jou en mij										
147	14-02-1983	De hippe heksen							195			
148	01-04-1983	Beter voor Bert										
149	01-05-1983	Sprookjesnacht aan zee										
150	27-06-1983	Het Delta duel							197			
151	17-10-1983	De tamme tumi							199			
152	07-11-1983	De lieve Lilleham							198			
153	16-03-1984	Amoris van Amoras							200			7
154	01-05-1984	De bevende berken										
155	30-07-1984	Het dreigende dinges							201			
156	05-11-1984	De kattige kat							205			14
157	08-12-1984	Angst op de "Amsterdam"							202			19
158	02-1985	De tandentikkers										
159	20-04-1985	De mooie millirem							204			
160	01-09-1985	De ruige regen							203			
161	02-09-1985	De bonkige baarden							206			27
162	25-11-1985	De kwaaie kwieten							209			
163	12-1985	De Tiroolse trawanten										
164	14-01-1986	De glanzende gletsjer							207			
165	02-1986	Sony-San										
166	28-05-1986	De hellegathonden							208			9
167	06-1986	Tegen de ZZZ										
168	07-10-1986	De jolige joffer							210			
169	15-12-1986	De eenzame eenhoorn							213			
170	01-01-1987	De parel in de lotusbloem							214			31
171	18-02-1987	De woeste wespen							211			
172	01-04-1987	Witte zwanen zwarte zwanen										
173	27-06-1987	De edele elfen							212			
174	02-11-1987	De Krimson-crisis							215			
175	22-12-1987	De krachtige krans							218			22
176	02-1988	Fata Morgana										
177	14-03-1988	De dappere duinduikers										
178	21-05-1988	De komieke Coco							217			33
179	01-10-1988	De wervelende waterzak							216			
180	01-10-1988	De speelgoedspiegel							219			13
181	09-01-1989	De kleurenkladder							223			
182	01-1989	Het gouden kuipje										
183	10-02-1989	Sagarmatha							220			10
184	01-06-1989	Bosspel										
185	24-06-1989	De bezeten bezitter							222			
186	01-09-1989	De rinoramp							221			6
187	04-11-1989	De kleine postruiter							224			
188	01-1990	De gouden friet										
189	26-01-1990	Het witte wief							227			8
190	17-03-1990	De goalgetter							225			
191	01-06-1990	Knokken in Knossos										
192	11-07-1990	De mysterieuze mijn							226			
193	02-11-1990	Het wondere Wolfje							228			4
194	18-02-1991	De scherpe schorpioen							231			1
195	23-02-1991	Tazuur en Tazijn							229			
196	01-06-1991	Spruiten voor Sprotje										
197	19-06-1991	Lambik Baba							230			1
198	10-10-1991	De tootootjes							232			3
199	13-01-1992	De krakende carcas							235			
200	03-02-1992	De klinkende klokken							233			5
201	27-02-1992	Pezige Peekah										
202	27-05-1992	Het kristallen kasteel							234			3
203	19-09-1992	De gulden harpoen							236			
204	07-12-1992	De stervende ster							239			
205	12-01-1993	De snikkende sirene							237			4
206	20-03-1993	De macabere macralles										
207	05-05-1993	De slimme slapjanus							238			3
208	06-1993	De Galapagos gassen										
209	30-08-1993	De pottenproever							240			
210	02-11-1993	De averechtse aap							243			
211	21-12-1993	Het Aruba-dossier							241			7
212	14-04-1994	Tokapua Toraja							242			1
213	06-1994	De mollige marmotten										
214	06-08-1994	De begeerde berg							244			10
215	09-1994	De vonkende vuurman							246			
216	29-11-1994	De 7 schaken							245			
217	05-1995	Geschiedenis in strip										
218	07-06-1995	Het kostbare kader							247			
219	08-1995	De razende race							249			
220	28-09-1995	Robotkop							248			
221	22-01-1996	Het grote gat							250			
222	14-05-1996	De verraderlijke Vinson							251			9
223	07-1996	Prachtige Pjotr							253			4
224	06-09-1996	Volle maan							252			5
225	30-12-1996	Tex en Terry							254			6
226	24-04-1997	De mompelende mummie							255			2
227	06-1997	De gevederde slang							258			
228	12-11-1997	De vogels der goden							256			2
229	08-12-1997	Amber							259			
230	31-03-1998	De rebelse Reinaert							257			8
231	04-1998	Het berenbeklag							261			
232	22-07-1998	De bonte bollen							260			
233	10-11-1998	Het enge eiland							262			
234	02-03-1999	Het verdronken land							263			
235	03-1999	Papa Razzi							265			
236	23-06-1999	Jeanne Panne							264			5
237	11-10-1999	De kernmonsters							266			
238	01-02-2000	Lilli Natal							267			2
239	02-2000	De stugge Stuyvesant							269			
240	22-05-2000	De koeiencommissie							268			
241	12-09-2000	De ongelooflijke Thomas							270			
242	03-01-2001	Big Mother							271			
243	03-01-2001	De europummel							273			
244	09-04-2001	De blote Belg							272			
245	2001	De olijke opruimers										
246	02-08-2001	De fleurige Floriade							274			
247	19-11-2001	De kunstkraker							278			
248	21-11-2001	Heilig bloed							275			
249	12-03-2002	In de ban van de Milt							276			
250	03-07-2002	De verdwenen verteller							277			
251	09-09-2002	De ludieke les										
252	21-10-2002	De laatste vloek							279			
253	11-02-2003	De kus van Odfella							280			
254	03-06-2003	De gevangene van Prisonov							281			
255	23-09-2003	De breinbrekers							282			
256	14-01-2004	Paniek in Palermo							283			
257	02-2004	De koppige kluizenaar										
258	04-05-2004	Kaapse kaalkoppen							284			
259	14-05-2004	De guitige gast										
260	24-08-2004	Verraad op de Veluwe							285			
261	30-10-2004	De razende rentmeester										
262	13-12-2004	De flierende fluiter							286			
263	04-04-2005	De formidabele fantast							287			
264	23-04-2005	Het mopperende masker							290			
265	25-07-2005	Het slapende goud							288			
266	09-2005	De lepe luis										
267	24-09-2005	De energieke guiten										
268	01-10-2005	De blikken blutser							290			
269	14-11-2005	De kaduke klonen							289			
270	12-2005	De sinistere site										
271	02-03-2006	De bangeschieters							291			21
272	04-03-2006	De primitieve paljassen										
273	09-06-2006	De pronte professor										
274	22-06-2006	De nachtwachtbrigade							292			
275	05-08-2006	Sinjeur Stekkepoot										
276	26-08-2006	De vergeten vluchtelingen										
277	08-2006	De terugkeer van de lepe luis										
278	17-09-2006	Het rinkelende raderwerk										
279	11-10-2006	De kaperkoters							293			
280	26-11-2006	De weerwaterman										
281	06-01-2007	De microkomiek										
282	01-02-2007	De tikkende tinkan							294			
283	02-05-2007	De krasse kroko							295			
284	24-05-2007	De curieuze neuzen							296			
285	09-06-2007	De venijnige vanger										
286	13-09-2007	De joviale Gille							297			
287	10-11-2007	De treiterende trien										
288	12-12-2007	De elfstedenstunt							298			
289	12-03-2008	Het babbelende bad							299			
290	01-04-2008	De toetercup										
291	22-04-2008	Het machtige monument							300			
292	04-2008	De bosbollebozen										
293	12-08-2008	De dartele draak							301			
294	13-09-2008	De kribbige krab										
295	02-12-2008	De knikkende knoken							303			
296	12-12-2008	De sterrensteen							302			
297	14-02-2009	De werken van Lambik										
298	20-05-2009	De jokkende joker							304			
299	14-07-2009	De tijdbobijn							305			
300	18-07-2009	De kokende kei										
301	2-11-2009	De rillende rots							307			
302	18-11-2009	De stralende staf							306			
303	19-12-2009	Krimson break										
304	22-02-2010	De gamegoeroe							308			
305	22-05-2010	Juffertje Janboel										
306	15-06-2010	De halve Havelaar							310			
307	13-07-2010	De meteomachine										
308	14-07-2010	De watersater							309			
309	09-2010	De barre bacterie										
310	2-10-2010	De stuivende stad							311			
311	23-10-2010	Taxi tata										
312	24-01-2011	De kwakende queen							313			
313	09-03-2011	De zappende ziel							312			
314	26-03-2011	Expeditie Robikson										
315	13-05-2011	Het lijdende Leiden							314			
316	28-01-2012	De spottende spiegel										
317	03-09-2011	De bananenzangers							315			
318	23-12-2011	Krimsonia							316			
319	2011	De laaiende linies										
320	28-01-2012	Het vurige Vitamitje										
321	11-04-2012	Het bizarre blok							317			
322	30-06-2012	De coole Kastaar										
323	02-08-2012	Suske de rat							319			
324	08-08-2012	De suikerslaven							318			
325	13-11-2012	De tirannieke tor							320			
326	21-11-2012	Het ijzeren duel							321			
327	19-6-2013	De vliegende rivier							322			
