= Het Scheepvaartmuseum =

Maritime museum in Amsterdam, Netherlands

The Maritime Museum
- Het Scheepvaartmuseum
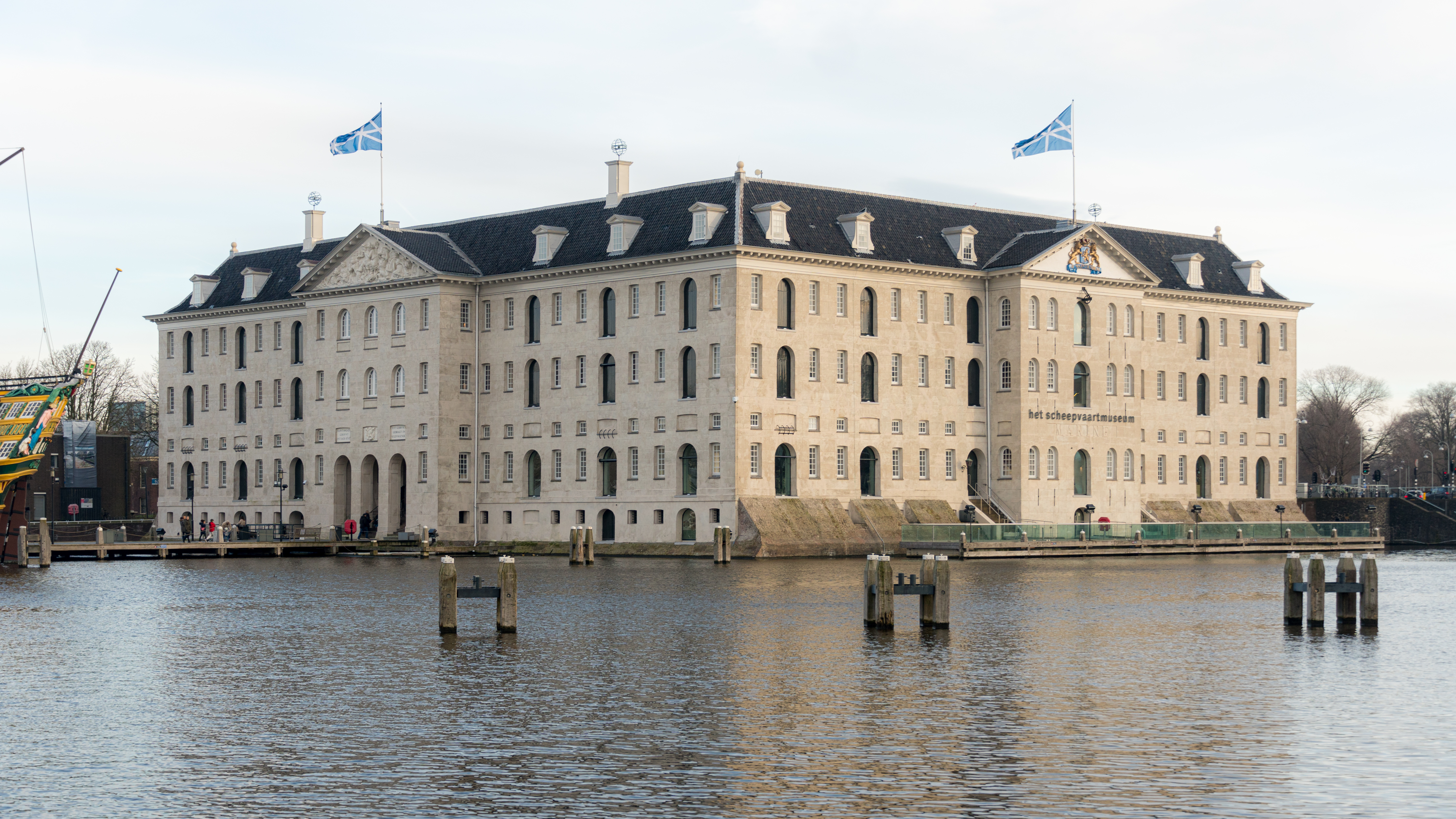
- 's Lands Zeemagazijn in 2024.

- Location within the centre of Amsterdam
- Established: 1916
- Location: Kattenburgerplein 1 Amsterdam, Netherlands
- Coordinates: 52°22′18″N 4°54′53″E
- Type: Maritime museum
- Visitors: 300,000 (2015)
- Director: J.H. Gerson (ad interim)
- President: Vacancy
- Website: www.hetscheepvaartmuseum.com

The Maritime Museum (Dutch: Het Scheepvaartmuseum, pronounced [ət ˈsxeːpfaːrtmyˌzeːjʏm]) formerly Nederlands Scheepvaartmuseum Amsterdam (Dutch Maritime Museum Amsterdam) is a maritime museum in Amsterdam in the Netherlands.

== Collection ==
The museum is dedicated to maritime history and contains many artefacts associated with shipping and sailing. The collection contains, among other things, paintings, scale models, weapons and world maps. The paintings depict Dutch naval officers such as Michiel de Ruyter and historical sea battles.

The map collection includes works by 17th-century cartographers Willem Blaeu and his son Joan Blaeu. The museum also has a surviving copy of the first edition of Maximilianus Transylvanus' work, De Moluccis Insulis, the first to describe Ferdinand Magellan's voyage around the world.

== Amsterdam replica ==
Moored outside the museum is a replica of the Amsterdam, an 18th-century ship which sailed between the Netherlands and the East Indies. The replica was built in 1985–1990.

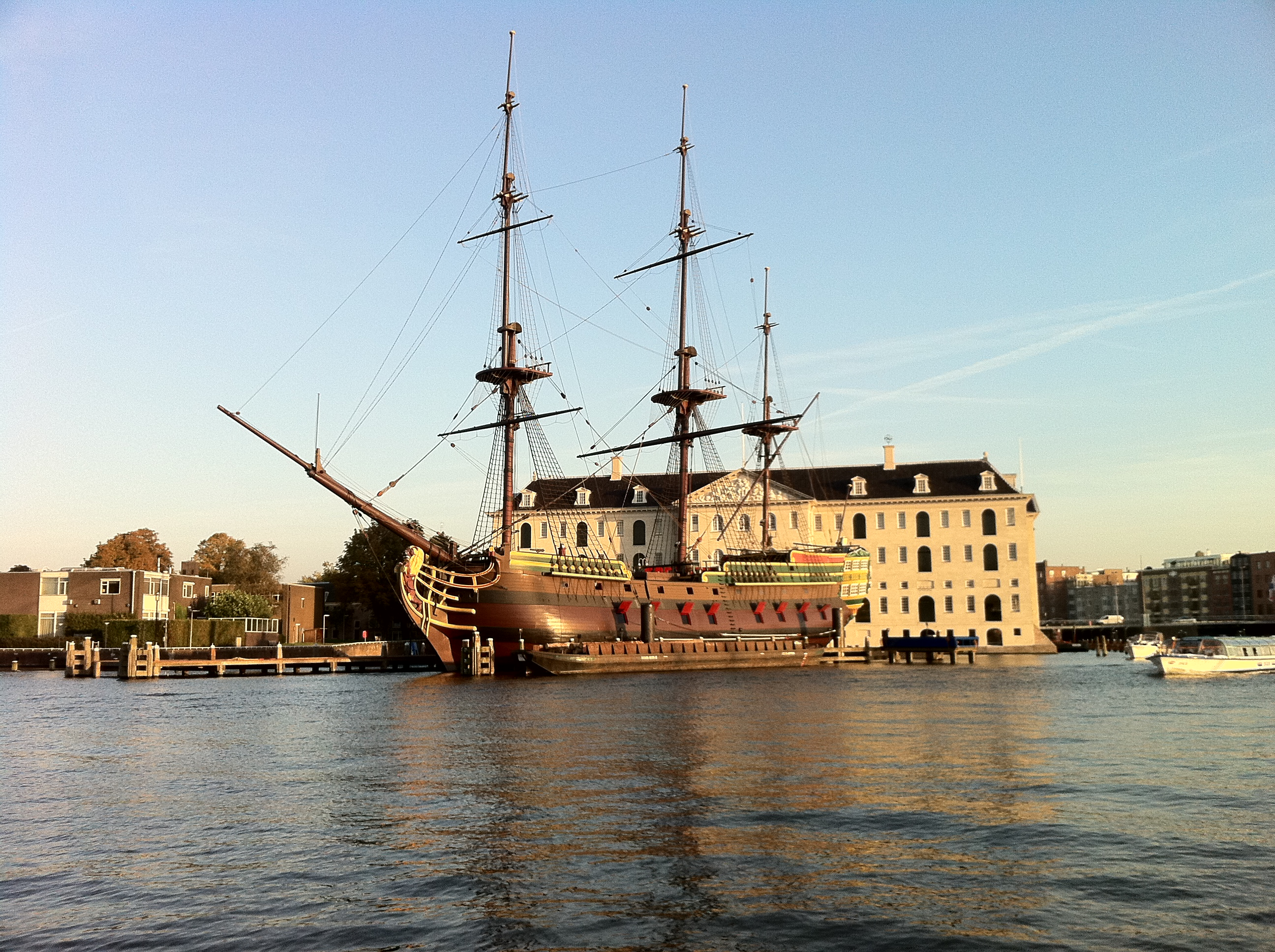
A 1990 replica of the Amsterdam is moored next to the museum.

== Replica in China ==
A smaller replica of the building is part of the Dutch Village Gaoqiao, a planned city and neighborhood of the large community Pudong, Shanghai, People's Republic of China at 31.340236°N 121.572857°E, next to another replica of the Hofwijck.

== History ==
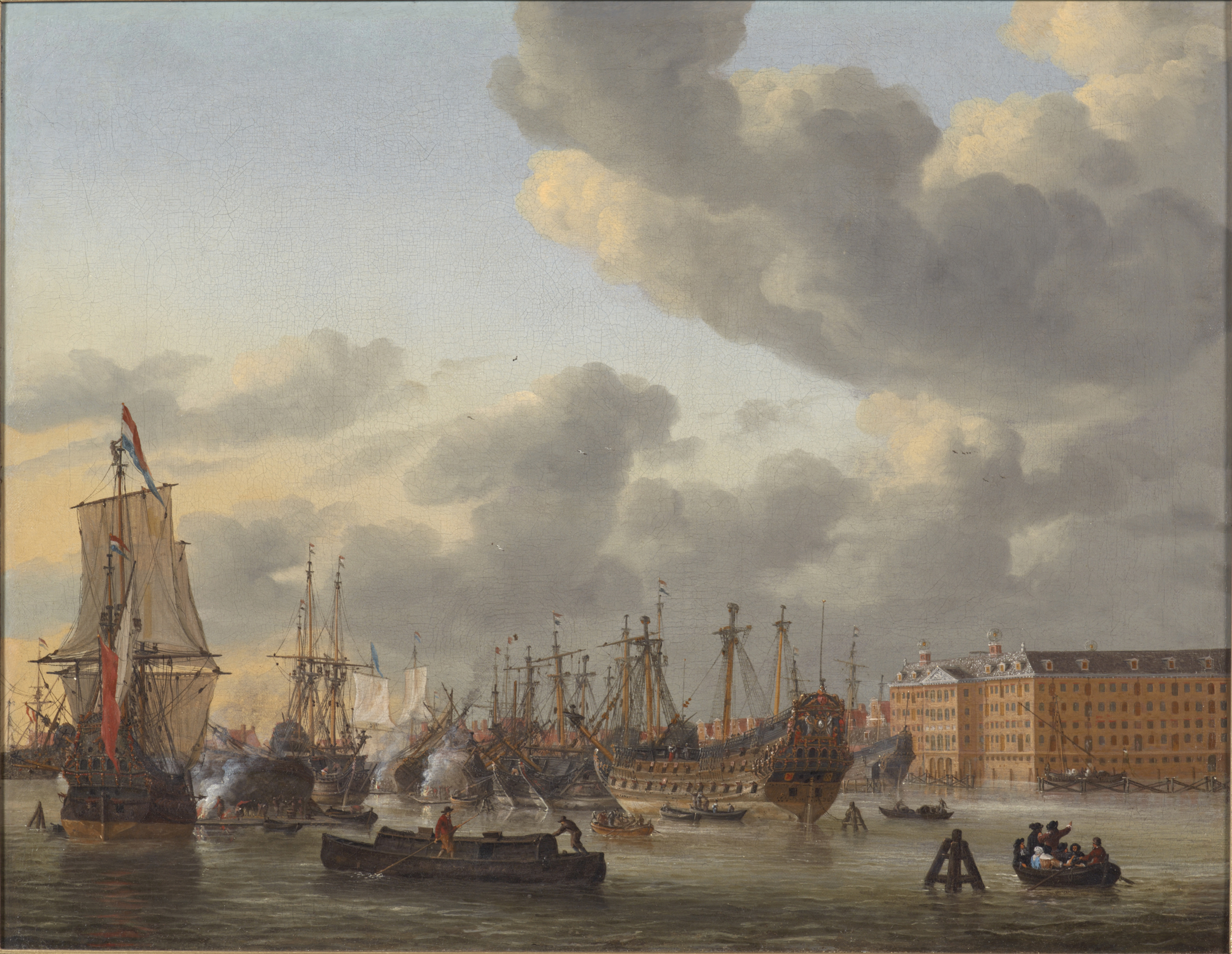
View of the IJ and 's Lands Sea-arsenal in Amsterdam, 1664 by Reinier Nooms

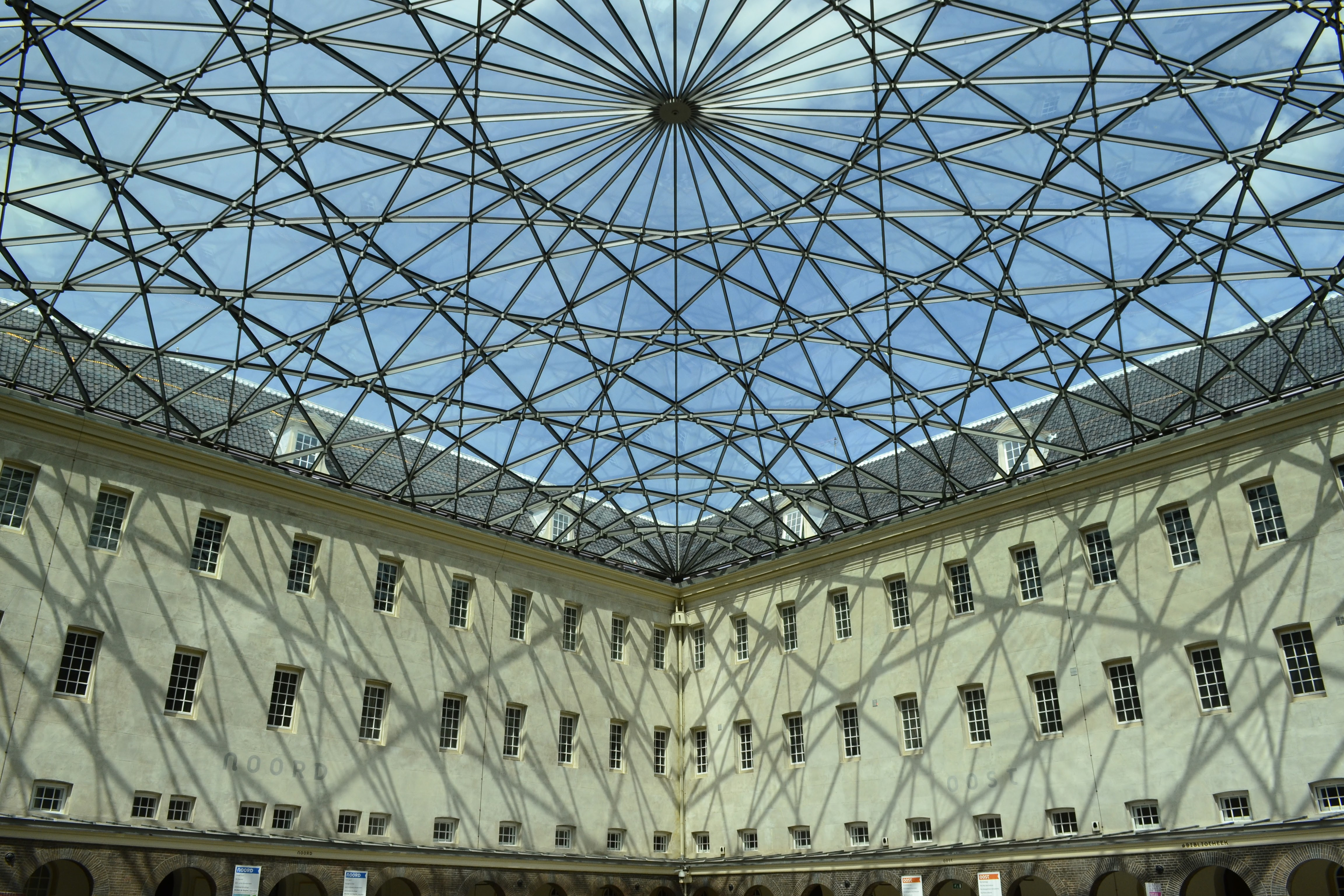
The glass roof of the courtyard inspired by the compass rose and rhumb lines on old nautical charts.

The museum is housed in a former naval storehouse, 's Lands Zeemagazijn or Admiraliteits Magazijn, designed by the Dutch architect Daniël Stalpaert and constructed in 1656. The museum moved to this building in 1973.

After an extensive renovation in 2007–2011, Het Scheepvaartmuseum reopened on 2 October 2011.

The museum was formerly called Nederlands Scheepvaartmuseum Amsterdam (Netherlands Maritime Museum Amsterdam). It was renamed to Het Scheepvaartmuseum (The Maritime Museum).

The museum had 419,060 visitors in 2012. It ranked as 12th most visited museum in the Netherlands in 2013. The museum had 300,000 visitors in 2015.

== Controversies ==
In 2013, there was a deadly shooting incident during the "Waterfront" festivity at the museum. For the next three months, the museum was not allowed to rent out its space.

After 2013, the number of visitors started to decline and director Willem Bijleveld, who had supervised the renovation of 2011, departed after a tenure of 18 years. The museum was criticised for having become too commercial for a cultural institution and having been turned into an amusement park. The "Raad van Cultuur" — a government board that monitors cultural activity in the Netherlands and advises the government on subsidies for museums — judged that the Scheepvaartmuseum had focused too much on entertainment and not enough on its task as a museum.

The next director was Pauline Krikke, the former mayor of Arnhem and a prominent member of the VVD, a centre-right political party that was senior partner in the second Rutte cabinet. Krikke came into conflict with the management team of the museum and the "Raad van Toezicht" (Board of Supervision) concerning a perceived lack of communication. During a confrontation on 15 November 2015, the management team expressed its lack of confidence in Krikke, who resigned. The former director of the Rembrandt House Museum, Michael Huijser, was appointed as the new director of the museum.
