= List of Suske en Wiske books in English =

The Suske en Wiske comic books, originally created by Willy Vandersteen have had four print runs in the English language. The first of these was called Willy and Wanda and was released in the United States. The second and third were released in the UK, Bob and Bobette and Spike and Suzy. The fourth is Luke and Lucy and was released in Belgium.

== Willy and Wanda ==
Released in 1976 in the United States. The last two are specials released in 1986-88.

- An Island called Hoboken (1976)
- The Zincshrinker (1976)
- The King Drinks (1976)
- A Fool's Gold (1976)
- The Tender-Hearted Matador or Duck, Lambik, or Your Goose is Cooked (1976)
- The Iron Flowerpotters (1976)
- The Merry Musketeers (1976)
- The Circus Baron (1976)
- The Golden Flower (1976)
- Dancing Cards (1983)
- Sony-San (1986)
- The Jewel in the Lotus (1987)

== Bob and Bobette ==
1. The Diamond Boomerang (1989)
2. The Flying Bed (1989)
3. The Texas Rangers (1989)
4. The Plunderers (1989)
5. The Poisoned Rain (1990)
6. Kingdom of the Sea Snails (1990)
7. Rhino Rescue (1990)
8. The Amazing Coconut (1990)

The following 'Bob and Bobette' specials were released on mainland Europe, though they were not released with the Bob and Bobette set.

- The Stroppy Steward (2004)
- The Energetic Rascals (2005) - a downloadable comic, released for Electrabel
- The Pretty Clever Professor (2006) - made for Technopolis.

== Spike and Suzy ==
1. Sagarmatha (1998)
2. The Circle of Power (1998)
3. The Secret of the Incas (1998)
4. The Fairies of Efteling (1999)
5. The Loch Ness Mystery (2000)
6. Highland Games (2001)

== Luke and Lucy ==
- Luke and Lucy: The Texas Rangers (film, 2011)
- The Blood Brother (2013) - made for Sanquin Blood Supply
- Auntie Biotica (2015) - made for Belgian Antibiotic Policy Coordination Committee (BAPCOC)
- A Beasty Bridge (2018)- commissioned by the Flemish Department of Environmental and Spatial Development in cooperation with Infra Eco Network Europe in support of the construction of eco-ducts to allow wild animals to cross over highways safely.
- The Busy Bumblebees (2024) - Mini comic, 12 pages - celebrating Bee Week, an initiative of the Flemish government.
- The Fierce Firemakers (2025) - Mini comic, 12 pages - Global Activity Report 2023-2024 of Vyncke.
